= Grade II* listed buildings in Blaby (district) =

There are over 20,000 Grade II* listed buildings in England. This page is a list of these buildings in Blaby.

== Blaby ==
Name	Location	Type	Completed (Note: The date given is the date used by Historic England as significant for the initial building or that of an important part in the structure's description.)	Date designated	Grid ref. (Note: Sometimes known as OSGB36, the grid reference is based on the British national grid reference system used by the Ordnance Survey.) Geo-coordinates	Entry number (Note: The "List Entry Number" is a unique number assigned to each listed building and scheduled monument by Historic England.)	Image
Church of St Michael and All Angels	Cosby, Blaby	Parish Church	11th century	7 October 1957	SP5479994859; 52°32′56″N 1°11′36″W	1361087	Church of St Michael and All Angels More images
Church of St John the Baptist	Enderby, Blaby	Parish Church	14th century	7 October 1957	SP5375399428; 52°35′24″N 1°12′29″W	1361072	Church of St John the Baptist More images
The Old Tudor Rectory	Glenfields, Blaby	Vicarage	Late C15-early 16th century	7 October 1957	SK5373906051; 52°38′58″N 1°12′26″W	1361058	Upload Photo
Church of St Bartholomew	Kilby, Blaby	Church	10th century OR 11th century	7 October 1957	SP6033694997; 52°32′58″N 1°06′42″W	1177157	Church of St Bartholomew More images
Church of St Bartholomew	Kirby Muxloe, Blaby	Parish Church	Early 13th century	7 October 1957	SK5207204658; 52°38′14″N 1°13′55″W	1177204	Church of St Bartholomew More images
Church of All Saints	Narborough, Blaby	Parish Church	15th century	7 October 1957	SP5408397538; 52°34′23″N 1°12′12″W	1074720	Church of All Saints More images
Church of St Michael	Stoney Stanton, Blaby	Parish Church	Late 14th century	7 October 1957	SP4895594789; 52°32′56″N 1°16′46″W	1074704	Church of St Michael More images
Church of All Saints	Thurlaston, Blaby	Parish Church	13th century	7 October 1957	SP5021099072; 52°35′14″N 1°15′37″W	1177364	Church of All Saints More images
