= Littlethorpe, Leicestershire =

Village in Leicestershire, England

Coordinates: 52.56725°N 1.20327°W

Littlethorpe
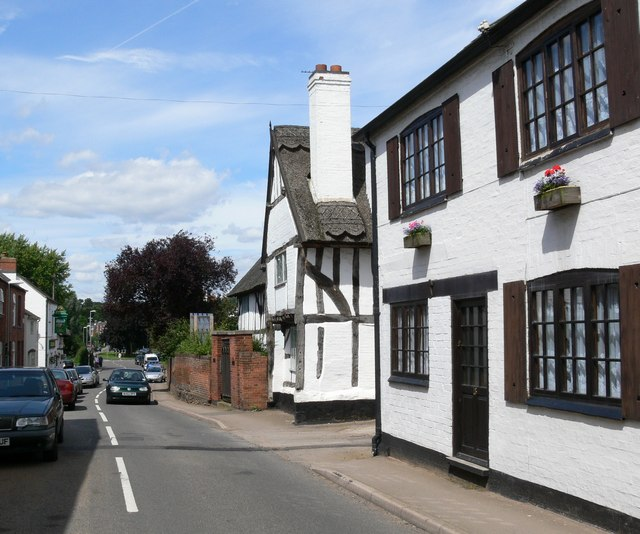

- Location within Leicestershire
- OS grid reference: SP5399696940
- Civil parish: Narborough
- District: Blaby
- Shire county: Leicestershire
- Region: East Midlands
- Country: England
- Sovereign state: United Kingdom
- Post town: Leicester
- Postcode district: LE19
- Dialling code: 0116
- Police: Leicestershire
- Fire: Leicestershire
- Ambulance: East Midlands
- UK Parliament: South Leicestershire

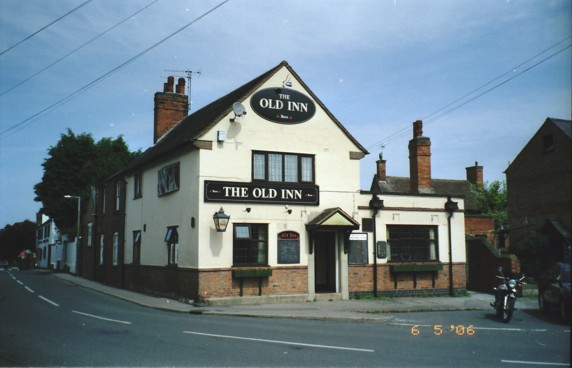
Old Inn Pub, Station Road, Littlethorpe

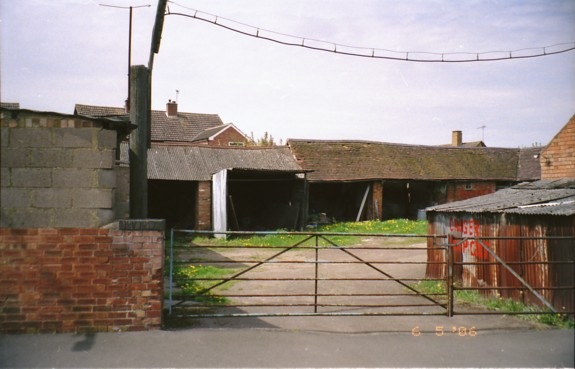
Riddington Road Farm

Littlethorpe is a hamlet approximately six miles (ten kilometres) south of Leicester, separated from the village of Narborough by the Leicester to Birmingham railway line, and the River Soar of which it is the true discharge.

The village has expanded since the Second World War most noticeably through the creation of two housing estates, the Jelson estate and the Barratt estate. Housing continues to be built, Parnell Close being completed during 2005.

== Services ==
The village has two pubs, the Plough Inn and the Old Inn.

Other services include a garden centre, funeral directors and a beauty salon.

Narborough railway station is situated close to Littlethorpe, on the edge of Narborough, and services run between Leicester and Birmingham.

== Littlethorpe Community Association ==
The Littlethorpe Community Association meets in the skittle alley of one of the pubs. The Association organises the annual gala on Littlethorpe Park and Thorpe meadows, as well as holding monthly coffee mornings at the village hall and operating the Santa Run each Christmas. More recently the association has organised Easter Egg Hunts and a Christmas decoration morning at the village hall.

The village has no church of its own, but is part of the parish of Narborough, along with Huncote. Previously Littlethorpe was part of Cosby parish.

== Twinning ==
Genappe, Belgium

The village, along with Narborough, shares its twinning with the village of Genappe in Belgium. Visits continue to take place, and in 2005 a football match was held between Genappe and local team, Narborough & Littlethorpe.

== Notable residents ==
Rapist and Child killer Colin Pitchfork, the first murderer to be brought to justice through the use of DNA finger printing, lived at Haybarn Close, Littlethorpe.

== See also ==
- All Saints Church, Narborough
