= Potters Marston =

Village in Leicestershire, England

Coordinates: 52.562°N 1.264°W

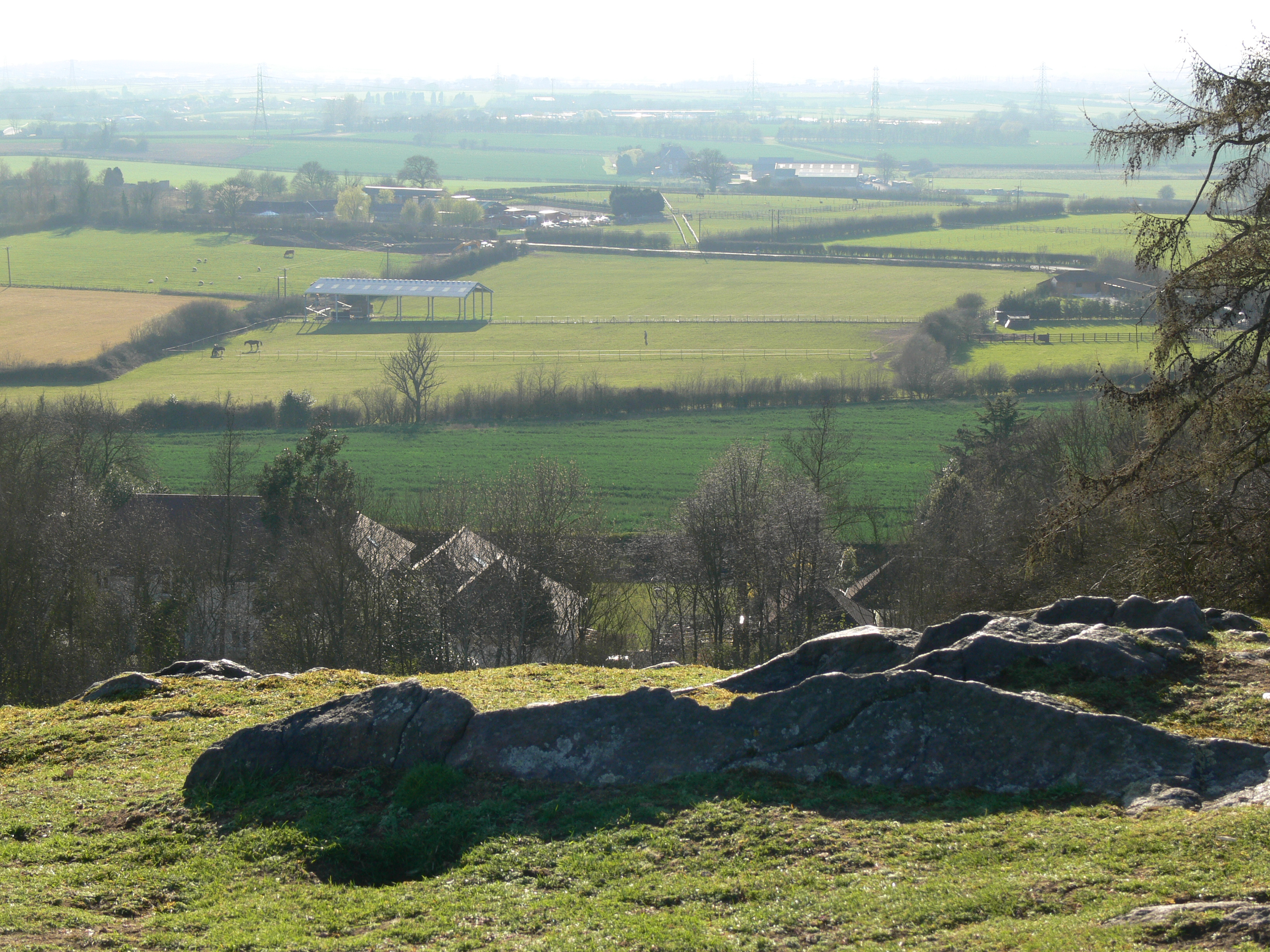
Towards Potters Marston

Potters Marston is a village and civil parish in the district of Blaby in Leicestershire, England. It has a population of around 40, and is roughly between Huncote and Stoney Stanton, but closest to Croft. It has a view of the remaining side of Croft Quarry and has 12 houses. The population of the village at the 2011 census was included in the civil parish of Croft.

The Church has a congregation of around 10 people, and was originally a barn which became a school house.

The area is home to the remains of a medieval kiln. The kiln appears to have operated from around 1100AD until around 1300AD. The resulting pottery known as Potters Marston Ware makes up around half the pottery found in Leicester on sites dating from its period of operation.
