= LE postcode area =

Postcode area within the United Kingdom

Leicester
- Postcode area
- Coordinates: 52.643°N 1.134°W
- Country: United Kingdom
- Postcode area: LE
- Postcode area name: Leicester
- Post towns: 12
- Postcode districts: 28
- Postcode sectors: 152
- Postcodes (live): 22,458
- Postcodes (total): 34,512
- Statistics as at May 2020

The LE postcode area, also known as the Leicester postcode area, is a group of 21 postcode districts in central England, within 12 post towns. These cover most of Leicestershire (including Leicester, Loughborough, Hinckley, Melton Mowbray, Coalville, Market Harborough, Ashby de la Zouch, Lutterworth, Wigston, Markfield and Ibstock) and most of Rutland (including Oakham), plus small parts of south Nottinghamshire and north Northamptonshire, and very small parts of Derbyshire and Warwickshire.

== Coverage ==
The approximate coverage of the postcode districts:

Postcode district	Post town	Coverage	Local authority area(s)
LE1	LEICESTER	Leicester	Leicester
LE2	LEICESTER	Oadby, Knighton, Highfields, Aylestone, Eyres Monsell, Glen Parva, Stoughton, Little Stretton	Leicester, Oadby and Wigston, Harborough, Blaby
LE3	LEICESTER	Braunstone, Glenfield, New Parks, Groby Road (A50), Leicester Forest East, Westcotes	Leicester, Blaby
LE4	LEICESTER	Beaumont Leys, Belgrave, Rushey Mead, Birstall, Thurmaston	Leicester, Charnwood
LE5	LEICESTER	Hamilton, Thurnby Lodge, Evington	Leicester
LE6	LEICESTER	Ratby, Groby, Newtown Linford	Hinckley and Bosworth, Charnwood
LE7	LEICESTER	Scraptoft, Thurnby, Anstey, Billesdon, Gaddesby, Hungarton, Rearsby, Tilton on the Hill, Tugby, Cropston, Thurcaston, Rothley, Barkby, Syston, Wanlip	Charnwood, Harborough, Melton
LE8	LEICESTER	Blaby, Great Glen, Fleckney, Kibworth, Peatling Magna, Countesthorpe, Whetstone	Blaby, Harborough
LE9	LEICESTER	Kirby Muxloe, Stoney Stanton, Cosby, Huncote, Croft, Desford, Newbold Verdon, Kirkby Mallory, Earl Shilton, Barwell, Sapcote, Sutton in the Elms, Broughton Astley, Thurlaston, Potters Marston	Hinckley and Bosworth, Blaby, Harborough
LE10	HINCKLEY	Hinckley, Burbage, Wolvey, Sharnford, Aston Flamville, Copston Magna	Hinckley and Bosworth, Blaby, Rugby
LE11	LOUGHBOROUGH	Loughborough, Nanpantan	Charnwood
LE12	LOUGHBOROUGH	East Leake, West Leake, Sutton Bonington, Long Whatton, Mountsorrel, Shepshed, Belton, Hathern, Quorn, Barrow Upon Soar, Sileby, Wymeswold	Charnwood, North West Leicestershire, Rushcliffe
LE13	MELTON MOWBRAY	Melton Mowbray	Melton
LE14	MELTON MOWBRAY	Ashby Folville, Brooksby, Harby, Hickling, Hoby, Ragdale, Rotherby, Scalford, Somerby, Stonesby, Waltham on the Wolds, Wymondham	Melton, Rushcliffe
LE15	OAKHAM	Oakham, Cold Overton, Empingham, Knossington, Langham, Manton, Owston and Newbold, Thistleton, Uppingham, Whissendine	Rutland, Melton, Harborough
LE16	MARKET HARBOROUGH	Market Harborough, Arthingworth, Ashley, Braybrooke, Caldecott, Clipston, East Carlton, East Farndon, East Langton, Great Oxendon, Hallaton, Marston Trussell, Medbourne, Rockingham, Sibbertoft, Stoke Albany	Harborough, West Northamptonshire, North Northamptonshire, Rutland
LE17	LUTTERWORTH	Lutterworth, Leire, Swinford, Bitteswell, Ullesthorpe, Theddingworth, Gilmorton, Catthorpe, Claybrooke Magna, Wibtoft	Harborough, Rugby
LE18	WIGSTON	Wigston, South Wigston, Kilby	Oadby and Wigston, Blaby
LE19	LEICESTER	Narborough, Enderby, Littlethorpe	Blaby
LE21	LEICESTER		non-geographic
LE41	LEICESTER	Large user (otherwise in LE4)	non-geographic
LE55	LEICESTER		non-geographic
LE65	ASHBY-DE-LA-ZOUCH	Ashby-de-la-Zouch, Boundary, Calke, Smisby, Willesley, Worthington	North West Leicestershire, South Derbyshire
LE67	COALVILLE	Coalville	North West Leicestershire
LE67	IBSTOCK	Ibstock	North West Leicestershire
LE67	MARKFIELD	Markfield	Hinckley and Bosworth
LE87	LEICESTER		non-geographic
LE94	LEICESTER		non-geographic
LE95	LEICESTER		non-geographic

The LE65 and LE67 districts were formed from LE6 circa 1992.

The LE19 district was formed in 2002 from parts of the LE3 and LE9 districts.

The LE2, LE3 and LE4 postcode districts are all among the top five by population.

== Map ==
LE postcode area map, showing postcode districts in red and post towns in grey text, with links to nearby CV, DE, NG, NN and PE postcode areas.

== See also ==
- Postcode Address File
- List of postcode areas in the United Kingdom
