= Whetstone, Leicestershire =

Village in Leicestershire, England

Coordinates: 52.572367°N 1.179907°W

Whetstone
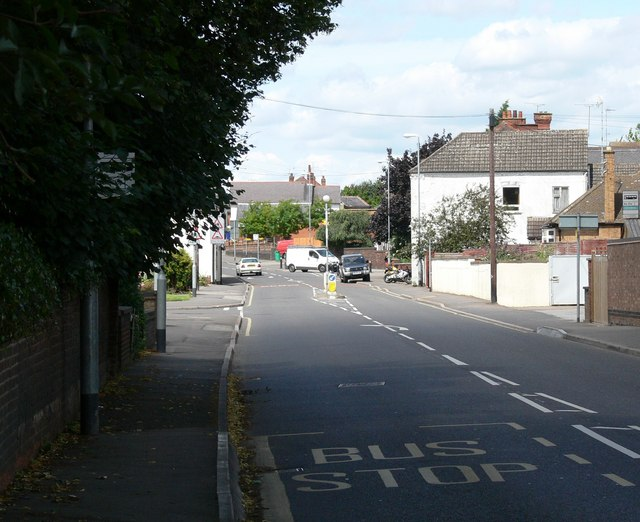
- High Street, Whetstone in July 2007

- Location within Leicestershire
- Population: 6,556 (2011)
- OS grid reference: SP556974
- Civil parish: Whetstone
- District: Blaby
- Shire county: Leicestershire
- Region: East Midlands
- Country: England
- Sovereign state: United Kingdom
- Post town: LEICESTER
- Postcode district: LE8
- Dialling code: 0116
- Police: Leicestershire
- Fire: Leicestershire
- Ambulance: East Midlands
- UK Parliament: South Leicestershire

Whetstone is a village and civil parish in the Blaby district of Leicestershire, England. It is close to Leicester, which is five miles to the north. The population at the 2011 census was 6,556. It is part of the Leicester Urban Area.

The village is bounded on the east by the A426 (on the other side of which is Blaby village), to the north by the railway line from Birmingham to Leicester, and to the west by the M1. It is well connected to Leicester City centre, with a very frequent direct bus service. From 1899 to 1963 the village was served by Whetstone railway station.

== Industry ==
Whetstone was the site of Frank Whittle's factory, where jet engines were developed. Babcock Services, ITP Engines Ltd and Converteam now occupy much of the site. Smaller companies rent space, mainly for storing commercial vehicles. Until 2002 the site sounded an Air Raid Siren at 8am every Wednesday.

The site of the Whittle factory became the English Electric Company (later GEC). A significant part of several nuclear power stations was made there in the 1960s and 70s. English Electric was one of the largest engineering companies in the Leicester area, employing thousands of workers and training hundreds of apprentices each year. At one point more than 4,000 workers had to be shipped in from Middlesex to reduce labour shortages. Many settled permanently, causing a boom in the late 1960s.

The computer performance measurement called the "Whetstone" was named for the Whetstone ALGOL compiler, developed by English Electric at the factory; it thus takes its name from the village.

Apart from Blaby, nearby places are Enderby, Glen Parva, Countesthorpe, Cosby, Littlethorpe and Narborough.

== Education ==
There are two schools in Whetstone: Badgerbrook primary school and St Peter's primary school.

== Sport ==
Whetstone has several football clubs: Blaby and Whetstone Boys, Whetstone Juniors and Saffron Dynamo F.C..Holmes Park is the home of the Leicester & Rutland County FA. Holmes Park is also home to the Leicester City Football Club Under 23s. The village is also home to rugby union clubs Leicester Lions RFC and Vipers RFC.

== Culture ==
Whetstone holds an annual Remembrance Parade led by the Church Lads' and Church Girls' Brigade, supported by 1st Whetstone Scouts and 1st Whetstone Guides.
