= Andrew Savage (disambiguation) =

Andrew Savage is an American singer, songwriter, musician, and painter.

Andrew Savage may also refer to:

- Andrew Savage, contestant on Survivor (American TV series)
- Andrew Savage, a 19th Century High Sheriff of Down
- Andrew Savage, CEO of OpenDor Media
- Andrew Savage, candidate in 2023 Blaby District Council election
- Andrew Savage, director of The Second Coming: Brought to You in Low Definition, British film of 2014
