= Croft Hill =

Biological Site of Special Scientific Interest in Leicestershire, England

Coordinates: 52.564°N 1.25°W

- Site of Special Scientific Interest
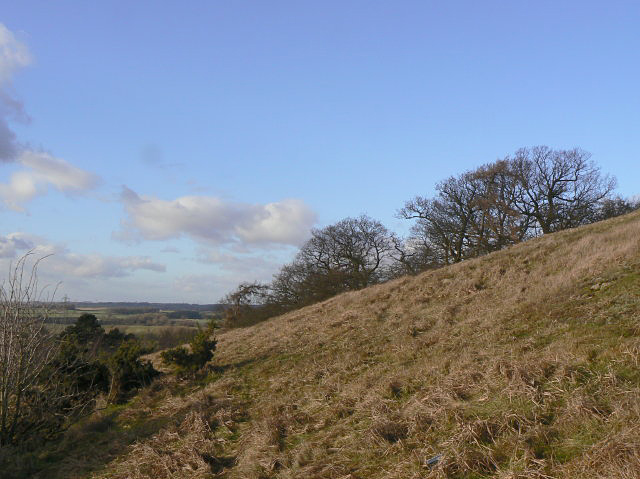
- Location of Croft Hill.
- Area of search: Leicestershire
- Grid reference: SP 509 966
- Interest: Biological
- Area: 2.0 hectares
- Notification date: 1994
- Location map: Magic Map

Croft Hill is a 128m high natural hill rising up the Soar flood-plain north of Croft quarry in Leicestershire, England. It stands out as an isolated landmark, and has been used as a meeting place for centuries.

The hill is a 2-hectare (4.9-acre) biological Site of Special Scientific Interest, overlooking the deep quarry and provides a number of habitats including broad leaved woodland, scrub land, acidic grassland and two other distinct areas of grassland. It is an important area in view of the variety of flora, fauna, birds and butterflies which inhabit or visit at various times of the year.

This site has short, tussocky grass in an open habitat, a nationally rare vegetation type. The granitic soil is thin and short of nutrients. The nationally scarce upright chickweed is abundant in some areas.

There is access to the site from Croft Hill Road, between the villages of Huncote and Croft, although there is no car park.

The area also consists of a smaller tailings hill east of the quarry, both hills can be reached by foot. Adjacent to the small hill is a nature reserve with an enclosed lake, where visitors can stand on a wooden deck over the water. The lake has a collection of reeds and other natural flora.
