= Narborough, Leicestershire =

Village in Leicestershire, England

Coordinates: 52.5727°N 1.2023°W

Narborough
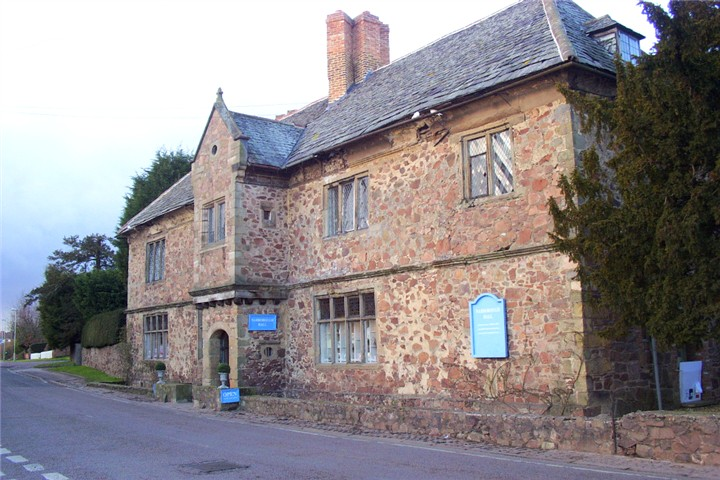
- Narborough Hall

- Location within Leicestershire
- Population: 8,448 (parish; 2011 Census)
- OS grid reference: SP540975
- Civil parish: Narborough
- District: Blaby
- Shire county: Leicestershire
- Region: East Midlands
- Country: England
- Sovereign state: United Kingdom
- Post town: Leicester
- Postcode district: LE19
- Dialling code: 0116
- Police: Leicestershire
- Fire: Leicestershire
- Ambulance: East Midlands
- UK Parliament: South Leicestershire

Narborough is a large village and civil parish in the Blaby district of Leicestershire, England, around six miles (ten kilometres) southwest of Leicester. The population of the civil parish (including Littlethorpe) at the 2011 census was 8,498.

The name is derived from the Old English north burh, meaning "north fort or stronghold". At the 2001 Census, the parish had a population of 8,402.

Surrounding villages include Enderby, Whetstone, Littlethorpe, Cosby, and Huncote.

== Location ==
Narborough is situated on or near several major transport corridors. The M1 motorway passes through the east of Narborough, and the Leicester to Birmingham railway line runs beside the River Soar on its way through the village. Coventry Road in the village centre runs along the course of the Fosse Way (a Roman road), which then joins back onto the present course of the B4114 link from Birmingham to Leicester.

Narborough is often split into two distinct parts, the (old) village core to the south and the newer Pastures estate to the north east. These areas are separated by the B4114 which runs through the middle of the two areas.

== Transport ==
=== Bus ===
Narborough is served by Arriva Midlands services 50, LC14, X84, providing links to Rugby, Enderby, Croft, Fosse Shopping Park, and Leicester city centre.

=== Rail ===
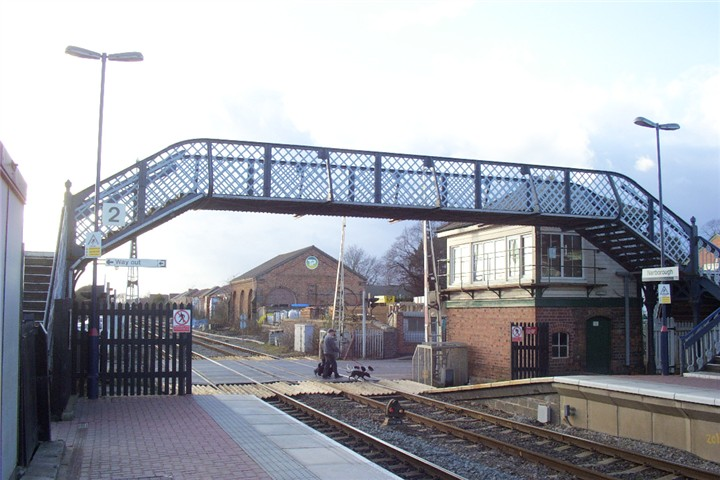
Narborough railway station

Narborough railway station is situated in the village centre and offers an hourly service with South Wigston and Leicester to the north, and Hinckley, Nuneaton and Birmingham in the south and west.

== Amenities ==
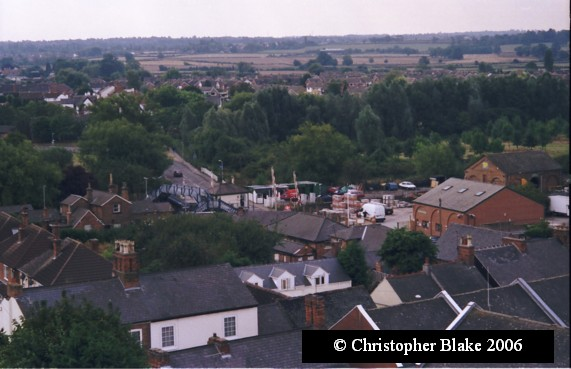
View from All Saints Tower with Littlethorpe in the distance

To the north-east of the village lies Carlton Park, a business park that included the headquarters of Alliance & Leicester (defunct 2011), who employed over 1,800 people locally. Carlton Park also has a Racquets and Health Club, David Lloyd (formerly Next Generation), which opened in the summer of 2006. Near to the village centre are the Blaby District Council offices.

As well as Greystoke Primary School in the village, The Pastures and Red Hill Field are the two other primary schools serving the locality. Pupils from these schools generally continue their education at Brockington College in Enderby or Lutterworth College.

There are two large GP practices in the old village centre; The Limes Medical Centre and Narborough Health Centre. The village also contains a variety of retail outlets, pubs, restaurants, coffee shops and other amenities.

Narborough is home to the Narborough Foxes Football Club which promotes fun and friendly football for all ages.

== Politics and government ==
Narborough is part of the South Leicestershire constituency and is currently represented in the House of Commons of the United Kingdom by Conservative, Alberto Costa.

== Religion ==
In addition to the Anglican Parish Church of All Saints, Narborough also has a Congregational Church situated on School Lane and a Catholic church, St. Pius X, on Leicester Road.

Narborough has been home to The Buddhist House, HQ for the Amida Trust, a Pureland Buddhist school, since 2001.

== Crime ==
Narborough was where Colin Pitchfork raped and murdered a 15-year-old schoolgirl, Lynda Mann, in 1983. He also killed a girl of the same age, Dawn Ashworth, in nearby Enderby in 1986. Initially a 17-year-old youth was suspected, and even confessed to one of the murders, but DNA testing cleared him. Following what was the first mass DNA screening of an entire community, Pitchfork was the first person in the world to be convicted of murder using DNA profiling.

== Industry ==
The Empire Stone Works was founded in Narborough in 1900. It specialised in producing pre-cast concrete for cladding, which could be coloured with pigments and hand-finished to match natural stone cills, copings and cornices. The factory was the largest employer in Narborough, employing over 300 people, and had its own railway sidings. The company ceased trading in 1994, soon after the completion of the MI6 building at Vauxhall Cross which features in many of the later James Bond films.

== See also ==
- Narborough Hall
