= Colin Pitchfork =

English child-murderer and rapist (born 1960)

- Pitchfork after his arrest in September 1987
- Born: Colin Pitchfork; 23 March 1960 (age 66); Littlethorpe, Leicestershire, UK
- Other name: David Thorpe
- Occupation: Baker
- Known for: First person convicted using DNA evidence
- Children: 2
- Status: Recalled to prison
- Convictions: Murder, rape, sexual assault, perverting the course of justice (22 Jan 1988)
- Penalty: Life imprisonment, minimum term 30 years (1988); reduced to 28 years on appeal (2009)

Details
- Victims: 4+ (sexual assault); 2 (murder)
- Span of crimes: 1979–1986

Colin Pitchfork (born 23 March 1960) is an English child-murderer and child-rapist. He was the first person convicted of rape and murder using DNA profiling after he murdered two girls in neighbouring Leicestershire villages: Lynda Mann in Narborough in November 1983 and Dawn Ashworth in Enderby in July 1986. He was arrested on 19 September 1987 and sentenced to life imprisonment on 22 January 1988 after pleading guilty to both murders. The sentencing judge gave him a 30-year minimum term (reduced to 28 years on appeal).

He was granted parole in June 2021 and released on licence on 1 September that year. On 19 November the same year, he was recalled to prison for breaching his licence conditions. Pitchfork was granted parole a second time in June 2023, but after intervention from the Lord Chancellor Alex Chalk, the Parole Board reviewed its decision and decided not to release him.

== Life ==
The Pitchfork name originates from Warsop and Worksop in Nottinghamshire. In July 1950 his parents married at St James' Parish Church, Newbold Verdon, Leicestershire. Mollie Beck (7 March 1931 - 16 February 1999) was from Brascote Lane in Newbold Verdon. Alwyn Pitchfork (26 December 1926 - 10 January 2012) was from Clowne in Derbyshire. His grandfather James Henry Beck died on 26 September 1959 and had lived at 6 Brascote Lane.

Pitchfork lived at 6 Brascote Lane in Newbold Verdon, attending school in Market Bosworth and Bosworth College in Desford. He was in the 1st Newbold Verdon Scout Group, gaining the Chief Scout's Award in September 1976. He was one of four scouts chosen in Leicestershire to go to the 14th World Scout Jamboree in Norway in August 1975, amongst 1,600 scouts from the UK. Molly Pitchfork, his mother, was the Group Scout Leader. Pitchfork had briefly joined the Venture Scout unit, run by his mother, but his increasing number of sexual convictions became incompatible with remaining in the unit.

Pitchfork married a social worker in early 1981 and moved to the Leicestershire village of Littlethorpe.

Before his marriage Pitchfork had been convicted of indecent exposure and had been referred for therapy to the Carlton Hayes Hospital, Narborough.

Pitchfork had obtained work in Hampshires Bakery in Leicester in 1976 as an apprentice at the bakery head office on King Richard III Road; Coombs Hampshires closed in 2011, near the present-day Castle Mead Academy. He continued to work there until his arrest for the murders. He became particularly skilled as a sculptor of cake decorations and had hoped eventually to start his own cake decorating business. According to his supervisor he was "a good worker and time-keeper, but he was moody... and he couldn't leave women employees alone. He was always chatting them up."

== Crimes ==
In October 1977, he was fined £30 by Market Bosworth magistrates for exposing himself to a schoolgirl, pleading guilty, when aged 17.

In 1979, Pitchfork forced a 16-year-old girl into a field and sexually assaulted her.

On 14 February 1980, he exposed himself to two teenage girls in Earl Shilton, and was given a year's probation by Hinckley magistrates.

On 21 November 1983, 15-year-old Lynda Mann took a shortcut on her way home from babysitting instead of taking her normal route home. She did not return and her parents and neighbours spent the night searching for her. The next morning, she was found raped and strangled on a deserted footpath known locally as the Black Pad. Using forensic science techniques available at the time, police linked a semen sample taken from her body to a person with type A blood and an enzyme profile that matched only 10% of males. With no other leads or evidence, the case was left open.

In October 1985, Pitchfork sexually assaulted another 16-year-old girl, threatening her with a screwdriver and with a knife at her throat.

Liz Knight was picked up by Pitchfork on a Saturday in June 1986 and driven for 40 minutes from Wigston towards Great Glen. When she grabbed the steering wheel, Pitchfork's demeanour suddenly changed, and he decided to drive to her house, and not attack. Pitchfork put his hand on her knee, saying: "I haven't hurt you yet." Pitchfork dropped Knight at her house, asking, "How about a goodnight kiss?" which she refused. Pitchfork said, "I bet you would never accept a lift from a stranger again."

On 31 July 1986, 15-year-old Dawn Ashworth left her home to visit a friend's house. Her parents expected her to return at 9:30 pm; when she failed to do so they called police to report her missing. Two days later, her body was found in a wooded area near a footpath called Ten Pound Lane. She had been beaten, savagely raped, and strangled. The modus operandi matched that of the first attack, and semen samples revealed the same blood type. Both girls had attended Brockington High School. Dawn's mother worked at Next plc in Enderby; George Davies offered a £10,000 reward.

An initial suspect was Richard Buckland, a local 17-year-old with learning difficulties who, while innocent of both murders, revealed knowledge of Ashworth's body and admitted to the Ashworth crime under questioning, denying the first murder.

=== Arrest and conviction ===
In early 1987, police asked every local male between the ages of 16 and 34 to voluntarily give blood samples for DNA testing. By the end of January, a thousand men had been tested. Men who declined to give blood samples found themselves under scrutiny by police.

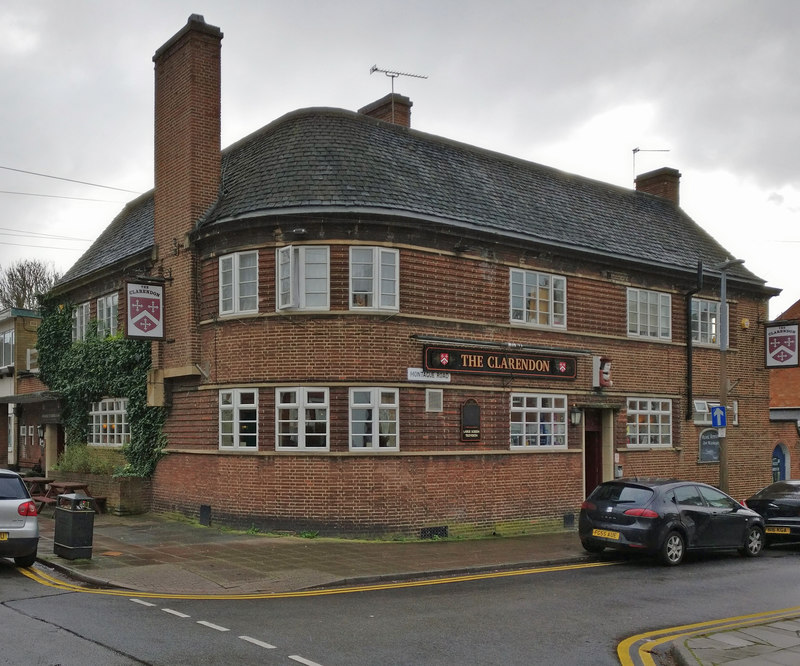
The Clarendon pub in Leicester, where Ian Kelly admitted, on Saturday 1 August 1987, that he had taken the test

According to 1988 news reports, one of Pitchfork's colleagues at the bakery, 23-year-old Ian Kelly, who lived outside the area under investigation, was overheard in a Leicester pub discussing how he had provided a blood sample on Pitchfork's behalf, by using a fake passport to masquerade as Pitchfork. He had agreed to do this in exchange for £200, and took the test on 29 January 1987. Another work colleague also mentioned that they had likewise been approached to take the DNA test, for Pitchfork. The conversation, during the lunchtime of Saturday, 1 August 1987, was overheard by other bakery colleagues, and 28-year-old Jackie Foggin (née Tyson), of Fleckney. She reported it to the police but not until 18 September. This vital tip-off was later credited with enabling Pitchfork's capture. Pitchfork had told Kelly that he wanted to avoid being harassed by police because of his prior convictions for indecent exposure. Kelly was arrested at 31 Stuart Street in Leicester on Friday, 18 September, and later received 18 months.

On Saturday, 19 September 1987, Pitchfork was arrested at 32 Haybarn Close, in Littlethorpe, by Detective Inspector Mick Thomas. Pitchfork's wife tried to attack Pitchfork when he told her that he had killed two girls.

During questioning, Pitchfork admitted to exposing himself to more than 1,000 women, a compulsion that began in his early teens. He later progressed to sexual assault and then to strangling his victims. Pitchfork said this was in order to protect his identity. Investigators rejected this, viewing the motivation for the strangulations as "perverted sadism". During his interviews with the police he admitted his crimes, but lied about the level and nature of the violence he had inflicted on his victims.

At his trial at Leicester Crown Court in January 1988, Pitchfork pleaded guilty to the two rapes and murders, in addition to sexual assault of two other girls, and conspiring to pervert the course of justice. In January 1988 he was sentenced to life imprisonment for the two murders and 10 years for raping the victims; he was also sentenced to three years for each count of sexual assault and three years for perverting the course of justice, with all sentences to run concurrently. A psychiatric report prepared for the court described Pitchfork as possessing a psychopathic personality disorder accompanied with a serious psychosexual pathology. The Lord Chief Justice at the time of his sentencing said: "From the point of view of the safety of the public I doubt if he should ever be released." The Secretary of State set a minimum term of 30 years; in 2009, Pitchfork's minimum term sentence was reduced on appeal to 28 years.

On 18 March 1988 George Davies gave Jackie Foggin a cheque for £10,000 at the Next head office in Enderby.

== Parole reviews ==
On 22 April 2016, the Parole Board for England and Wales heard Pitchfork's case for early release on parole. Pitchfork's advocates presented evidence of his improved character, noting that Pitchfork had furthered his education to degree level and had become expert at the transcription of printed music into braille, for the benefit of blind people. The families of victims Lynda Mann and Dawn Ashworth opposed his release on parole.

On 29 April 2016, the board announced that Pitchfork's application for release on licence had been refused, but recommended that he be moved to an open prison. In June 2016, Michael Gove, then Justice Secretary, agreed with the board's recommendation, and at some point prior to 8 January 2017, Pitchfork was moved to an undisclosed open prison.

In November 2017, Pitchfork was seen walking around Bristol, so it was assumed that he had been moved to HM Prison Leyhill in Gloucestershire.

On 3 May 2018, Pitchfork was refused release on licence. The Parole Board said Pitchfork would be eligible for a further review within two years. Lynda's mother said the board had "listened to us before the murderer". In 2017, it emerged Pitchfork would be released from open prison on unsupervised days out.

=== 2021: Release and recall ===
On 7 June 2021, Pitchfork was granted release on conditional licence. The Secretary of State for Justice, Robert Buckland, applied for a review of the decision under the terms of the Parole Board Reconsideration Mechanism, introduced in 2019, and Pitchfork remained in custody pending the outcome. On 13 July 2021, it was reported that the review had been refused and that Pitchfork would therefore be released. He was released on 1 September 2021.

In November 2021, Pitchfork was recalled to prison for breaching his licence conditions by "approaching young women" while on walks from his bail hostel. His second victim's mother, Barbara Ashworth, told BBC News that she was pleased "he's been put away and women and girls are safe and protected from him now". There are complaints that the Parole Board was insufficiently cautious in allowing Pitchfork's release. Justice Secretary Dominic Raab promised a Parole Board review. David Baker, a former police detective who helped capture Pitchfork, believes Pitchfork could deceive the Parole Board and pretend it was safe to release him. Baker maintains Pitchfork is a psychopath and it will never be safe to release him.

=== 2023: Consideration for release ===
The Parole Board's hearing to consider releasing Pitchfork again was postponed to 2023. His potential release was opposed by MP Alberto Costa.

In June 2023 it was announced that Pitchfork would again be released under parole. The decision was widely criticised. In July 2023, the Lord Chancellor intervened and ordered that the board reconsider their decision after a huge public outcry, particularly since Pitchfork breached his licence conditions within weeks of his initial release. Pitchfork's new parole hearing took place on 2 and 3 October 2023. In December 2023, parole was denied, meaning that Pitchfork would remain in prison.

=== 2025 review ===
Pitchfork challenged the Parole Board's decision on procedural grounds, and in February 2024 the Board agreed to schedule another hearing before a different panel to consider his potential release. On 16 May 2024, the Parole Board Chair, Caroline Corby, reversed an earlier decision that Pitchfork's parole hearing should be held behind closed doors; approval was granted for the next parole hearing to be broadcast due to public interest. There would also be a preliminary hearing behind closed doors to address "practical matters". In July that year, the Parole Board decided that the next hearing would not be held in public due to developments regarding allegations about Pitchfork's "relatively recent conduct", but no further details were given at that time. In October 2025, the Parole Board turned down Pitchfork's parole application and also refused permission for him to be moved to an open prison.

== Artwork ==
In April 2009, a sculpture that Pitchfork had created in prison and which was exhibited at the Royal Festival Hall, Bringing the Music to Life, depicted an orchestra and choir. The sculpture was exhibited as part of a venture by the Koestler Trust, having been purchased by the Festival Hall for £600. Following outrage in the media and from victim-advocate groups, it was removed from display.

== In popular culture ==
Pitchfork’s crimes were originally chronicled in the 1989 book The Blooding by Joseph Wambaugh.

Pitchfork's crimes were aired on the American true crime series Forensic Files in October 1996.

The killings featured in a 2002 episode of Real Crime "Cracking the Killer's Code". Pitchfork was played by John Duttine.

In 2014, ITV commissioned a two-part television drama, Code of a Killer, based on Pitchfork's crimes and the creation of DNA profiling. It starred John Simm as researcher Alec Jeffreys and David Threlfall as David Baker, the lead police detective. Pitchfork was played by Nathan Wright. The drama was first broadcast in two 90-minute episodes, on 6 and 13 April 2015. It was subsequently reformatted as three episodes and released on DVD.

Pitchfork's crimes are also the focus of an episode of the Sky series How I Caught the Killer.

== See also ==
- Beenham murders – led to one of the first voluntary mass blood tests in UK criminal history in 1966, and led to a similar outcome as in the Pitchfork case when the killer originally avoided the test before eventually being caught
- Murder of June Anne Devaney – led to the first mass fingerprinting initiative in British history in 1948
- Kirk Bloodsworth – the first American sentenced to death to be exonerated post-conviction by DNA testing
- Patrick Mackay – a British serial killer who confessed to have murdered up to 13 people, who has been considered for release since 1995
- Allan Grimson – British double murderer believed to have murdered up to 22 people, whose release is imminent
- John Cannan – murderer and suspected killer of Suzy Lamplugh, died in Full Sutton prison in November 2024.

UK cold cases where the offender's DNA is now known:

- Murder of Deborah Linsley
- Murders of Eve Stratford and Lynne Weedon
- Murders of Jacqueline Ansell-Lamb and Barbara Mayo
- Murder of Lindsay Rimer
- Murder of Lyn Bryant
- Murder of Janet Brown
- Murder of Linda Cook
- Murder of Melanie Hall
- Batman rapist, subject to Britain's longest-running serial rape investigation

== Cited works and further reading ==
- Cawthorne, Nigel; Tibballs, Jeffrey (1994). Killers. Boxtree. pp. 338–341. ISBN 978-0-7522-0850-3.
- Evans, Colin (1996). The Casebook of Forensic Detection: How Science Solved 100 of the World's Most Baffling Crimes. New York: John Wiley & Sons Inc. ISBN 978-0-471-07650-6.
- Wambaugh, Joseph (1990). The Blooding: True Story of the Narborough Village Murders. Bantam Books. ISBN 978-0-553-76330-0.
