= Narborough Hall =

House in Narborough, Leicestershire, England

Coordinates: 52.5717°N 1.2081°W

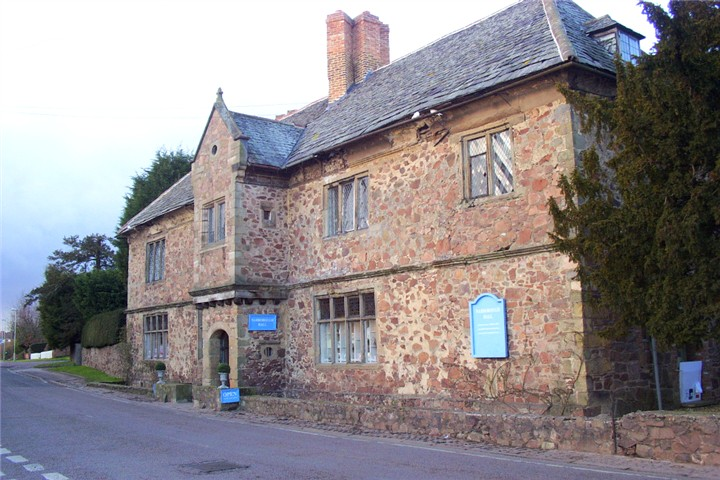
Narborough Hall, Narborough

Narborough Hall is a Grade II* listed building in Narborough in Leicestershire. Believed to date from 1596 this Elizabethan manor house was built by James Meade, a local landowner. However, it was only after it was extensively remodelled in the mid-19th century that it became known as Narborough Hall. It is notable because of its construction from local pink granite.

The property was first listed in 1952, but the following years saw a sad decline and culminated in a threat to demolish the house in the early 1970s. When the current owners Paul and Wendy Broadley bought it in 1976 it was a dilapidated wreck. Years of extensive renovation followed, much of the work being undertaken by Paul himself, and the Hall was brought back to its former glory.

To help the funding of the considerable undertaking and the maintenance of the house, the Broadleys opened the front rooms of the house as a shop in 1992. Now run by Paul and Wendy’s daughter and son-in-law Sophie and Simon, the shop has grown in size and now occupies five rooms on the ground floor.

== The Meade family ==
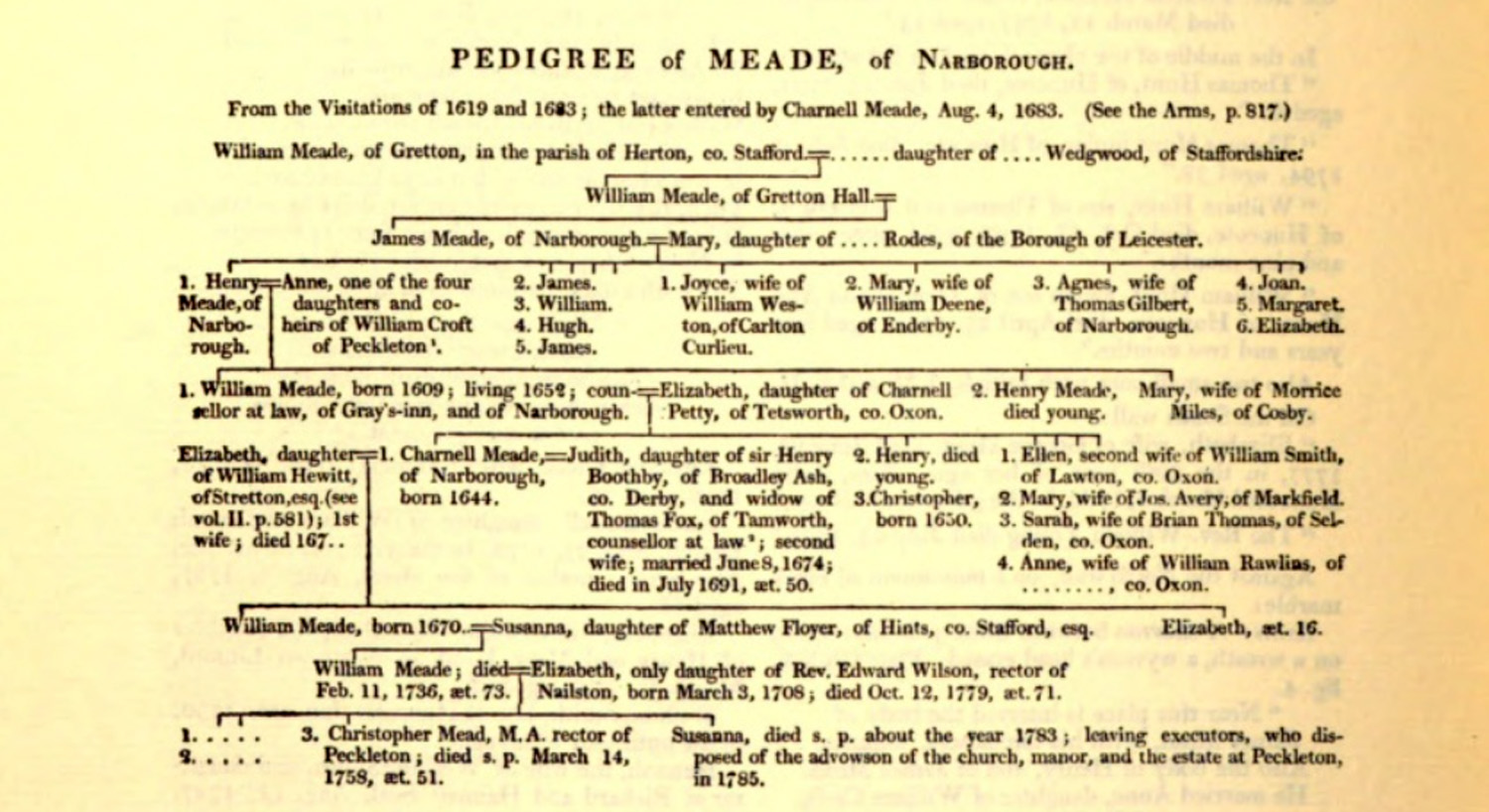
Family tree of the Meades of Narborough

James Meade (1555–1616) built Narborough Hall in about 1600. He was the only son and heir of William Meade (1500–1582) a wealthy landowner of Gratton Hall in Horton. In 1582 he married Mary Rodes and the couple had five sons and six daughters. When James died in 1616 his eldest son Henry Meade (1590- ) became the owner. Henry married in 1609 Ann Croft, the daughter and coheir of William Croft of Peckleton. When her father died in 1613 Ann inherited part of the Peckleton Estate and this was passed through successive generations of the Meade family until 1785.

Henry’s eldest son William Meade (1610–1664) was the next to inherit Narborough Hall. He became a barrister and was admitted to Gray's Inn in 1631. In 1637 he married Elizabeth Petty, the daughter of Charnell Petty of Tetsworth. His eldest son Charnell Meade (1644–1712) who was also a barrister inherited the house when William died in 1664. In the same year he married Elizabeth Hewitt, the daughter of William Hewitt of Stretton. The couple had a son and a daughter. Their son William Meade (1668–1714) who had married Susanna Floyer in 1699 inherited the house in 1712 when his father died. However, he only lived for two years after this so his eldest son William who was eleven years old at the time became the heir.

Upon gaining his majority William Meade (1703–1736) took control of Narborough Hall. In 1731 he married Elizabeth Wilson (1708–1779) who was the daughter of Reverend Edward Wilson. The couple had a son Christopher and a daughter Susanna. William died in 1736 at the age of only 33 leaving his property to his wife Elizabeth. She married in 1737 Reverend John Vann, the curate of Narborough. Unfortunately he died only twelve years later in 1749. Elizabeth lived with her unmarried daughter Susanna Meade (1732–1783) at Narborough and became fairly wealthy and influential. However, during the 1770s she appears to have invested unwisely and may have been in debt. According to John Throsby She died in 1779 and Susanna died in 1783. In 1783 a decree of the High Court of Chancery ordered that their property be sold. It was bought by Thomas Pares.

== The Pares family ==
Thomas Pares (1746–1824) was a very wealthy attorney and a banker who owned many properties. He was the eldest son of Thomas Pares (1716–1805) and Ann Norton who bought the family estate of Hopwell Hall. When his father died in 1805 Thomas inherited this house. He had previously acquired many other estates including Greyfriars, Leicester. He died unmarried in 1824 and left a very long complicated Will.

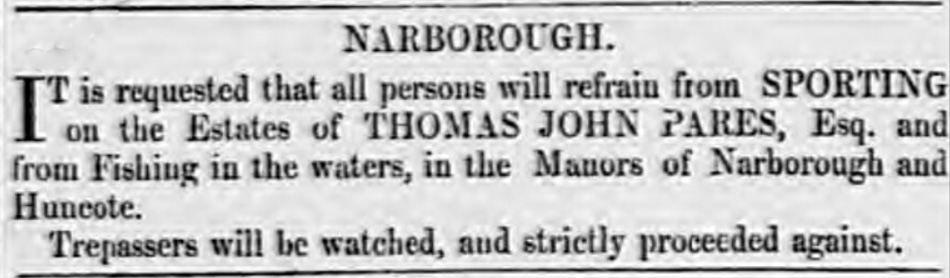
Notice of ownership of Thomas John Pares in 1847

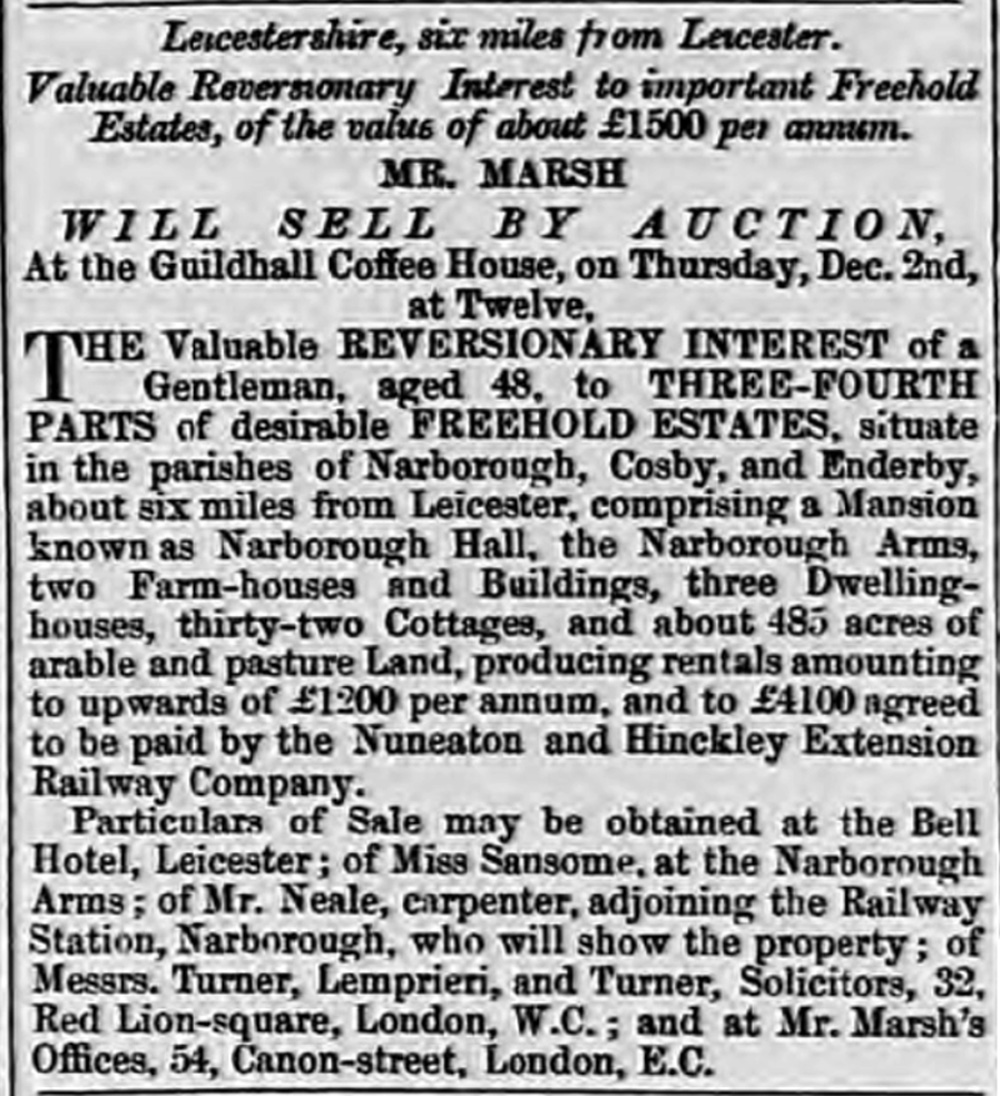
Sale of interest in Narborough Estate in 1869

Most of his land went to his younger brother John Pares (1749–1833). However the Narborough Estate and some other Leicestershire properties were placed under entail for the benefit of his other relatives. His niece Mary Ann Dod (1776–1846) was to receive the first life interest. She was the daughter of his sister Ann Pares who had married John Dod of Cloverley. In 1822 Mary Ann married Samuel Miles. (1776–1842). The couple went to live at Narborough Hall soon after their marriage and made numerous alterations to the house. They raised the level of the first floor, laid a fine oak parquet floor in the principle reception room, added a bay to this room and the principle bedroom above, was panelled along with the landing. They also added a brick built entrance hall, featuring large stained glass windows and a mock Tudor belvedere. Samuel died in 1842 and in his Will he mentions this life interest in Narborough Hall given to them by his wife’s uncle. Mary Ann died in 1846 and in accordance with the entail set up by her uncle Thomas Pares the house went to his great nephew Thomas John Pares (1821–1873). He owned the estate for the next 27 years mostly as an absentee landlord as he lived in Canada.

Thomas John Pares (1821–1873) who was called Tommy was born in 1821. His father was John Tylston Pares (1797–1831) and his mother Mary Burnaby, daughter of Edward Andrew Burnaby of Baggrave Hall. He was sent to Harrow School but in 1836 was asked to leave by the Headmaster. In 1840 at the age of 19 he married at Gretna Green Harriette Bermingham (1819–1901). They later married ‘officially’ in London. The couple had three daughters Harriette, Florence and Alice yet the union was not to last and the couple separated in 1847. Shortly before this separation Thomas took charge of the Narborough Estate when Mary Ann Miles died in 1846. He put a notice of ownership in the newspaper stating that trespassers will be prosecuted. This notice is shown.

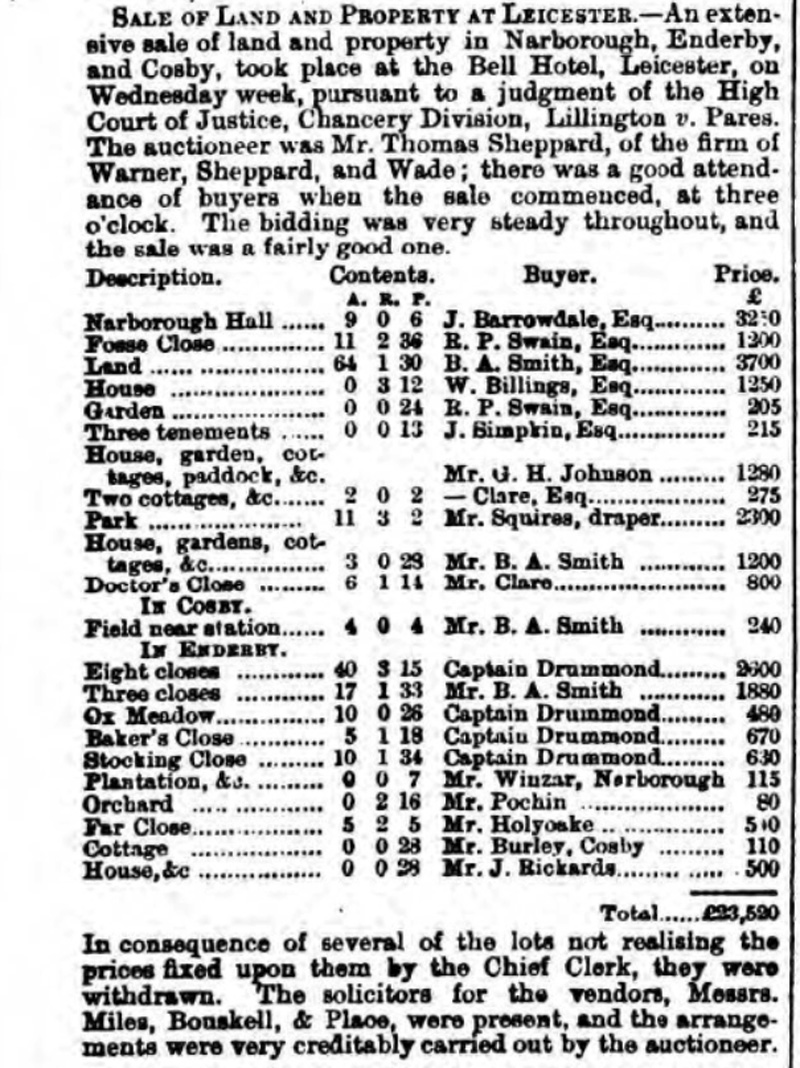
Sale of Narborough Estate in 1880

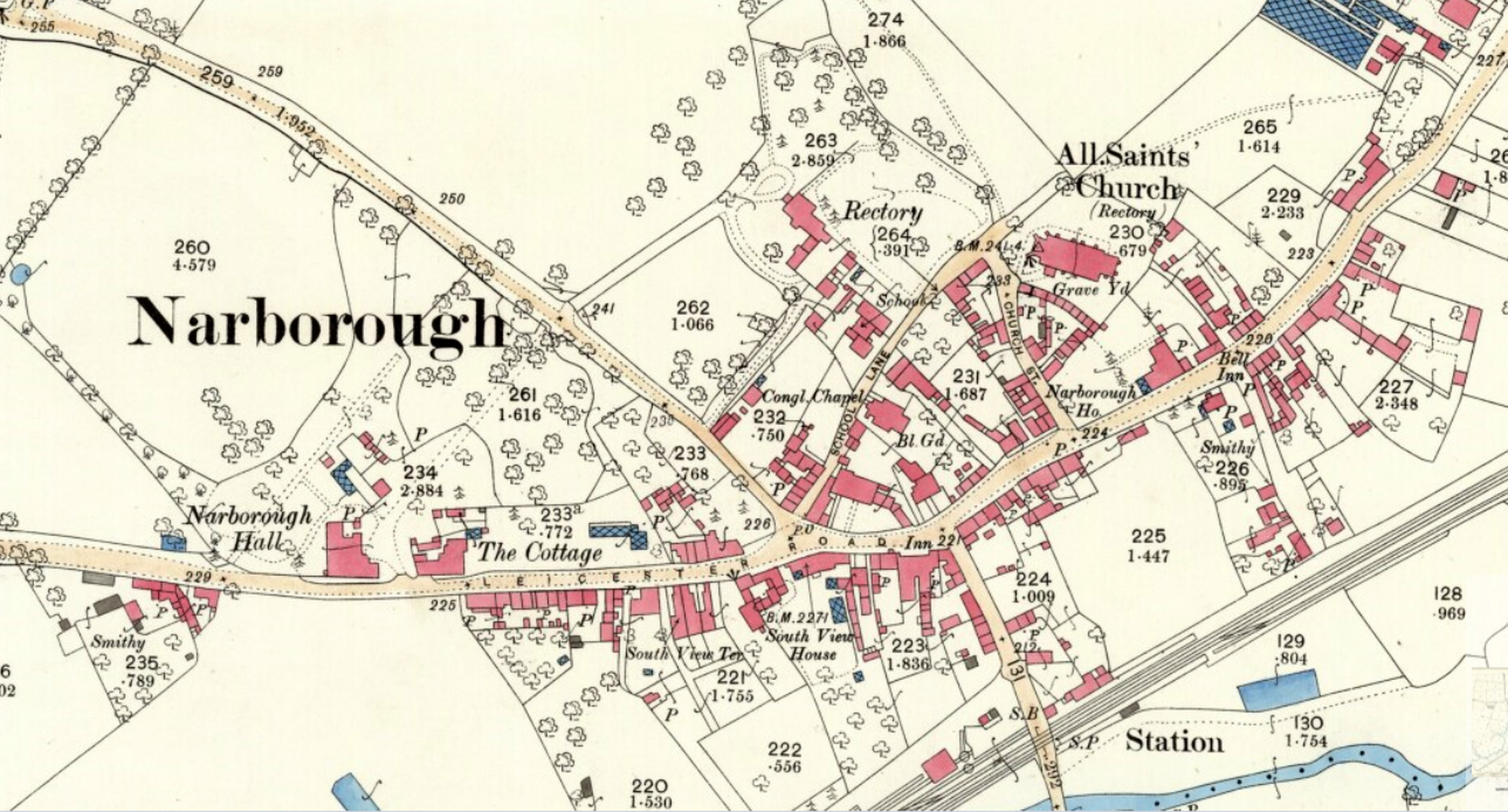
Map of Narborough in 1886

He left England some years later with his new spouse Georgina Mary Smith (1830–1897). His first child by her Thomas was born in 1854 in Italy. In the following year he came back for two of his daughters Harriette (called by her second name Emily) and Alice and the family went to live in Waukesha, Wisconsin. Harriette and Alice both stayed in the United States and married there in the 1860s. Thomas and Georgina had five more children and in about 1866 moved to Toronto, Canada where they remained for the rest of their lives. Alice whose name was now Macdonald, a widow, is shown as living with them in the 1871 Toronto Census.

It seems that in spite of his considerable income from his Narborough Estates Thomas was unable to manage. In 1861 he tried to sell part of the estate saying in the advertisement that “they are held for the life of Thomas John Pares now aged 41 years.” In the same advertisement he offers to sell his life insurance policy. In 1869 he tries to sell the reversionary interest on a much larger part of the estate including Narborough Hall. The advertisement for this sale is shown. It appears he was unsuccessful in this attempt.

He died in 1873 and under the terms of the entail his younger sister Mary Tylston Pares (1826–1899) and his daughters by his first marriage became the coheirs of the Narborough Estate. They arrived in England under the leadership of Alice (now Alice Macdonald) to claim their inheritance. This is mentioned in a newspaper article of the time regarding the case of Macdonald v. Pares. There was however a problem as Thomas’s sister Mary had been declared mentally incompetent and the case was delayed until 1879 when a decision by the High Court of Justice allowed the whole estate to be sold. The results of the ensuing sale in 1880 are shown. J. Barrowdale bought Narborough Hall.
