= Croft, Leicestershire =

Village in Leicestershire, England

Coordinates: 52.556383°N 1.243275°W

Croft
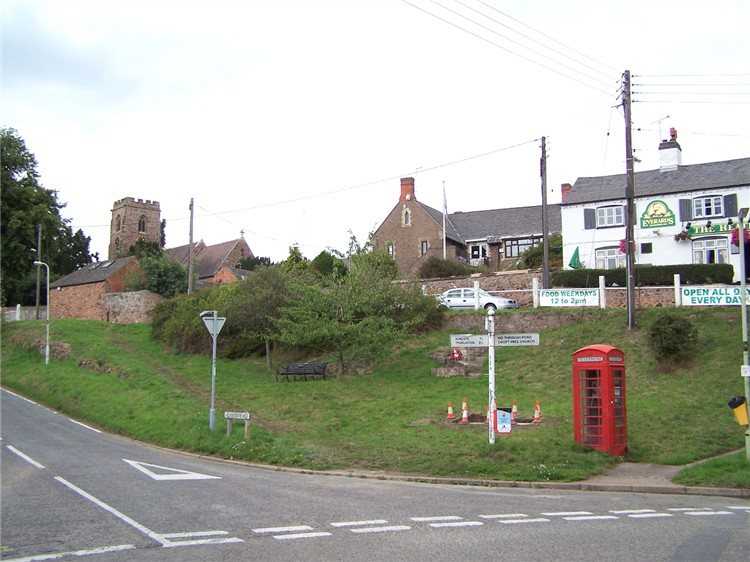
- Croft (2006)

- Location within Leicestershire
- Area: 1.3951 sq mi (3.613 km^{2})
- Population: 1,639 (2011)
  - Density: 1,175/sq mi (454/km^{2})
- OS grid reference: SP513955
  - London: 87.07 mi (140.13 km)
- Civil parish: Croft
- District: Blaby
- Shire county: Leicestershire
- Region: East Midlands
- Country: England
- Sovereign state: United Kingdom
- Post town: LEICESTER
- Postcode district: LE9
- Dialling code: 0116
- Police: Leicestershire
- Fire: Leicestershire
- Ambulance: East Midlands
- UK Parliament: South Leicestershire
- Website: Croft Parish Council

Croft is a village and civil parish in the Blaby district of Leicestershire, off the Fosse Way, straddling the River Soar. The population of the civil parish at the 2011 census was 1,639.

== Geography ==
The village is about 8 miles (13 km) southwest of Leicester, in the Blaby District of Leicestershire. The civil parish covers an area of 893 acres (3.61 km^{2}) and nearby places include Stoney Stanton, Broughton Astley, Huncote and Narborough.

Arbor Road and Broughton Road run from the B4114 (Fosse Way) into the village and Huncote Road runs towards the village of Huncote which lies to the other side of Croft Hill. The village comprises a mix of house types of various ages, factories and shops. The village has a primary school, parish church and public house. Croft Quarry occupies a site at the end of the older part of the village.

Next to the quarry is the natural Croft Hill, standing 128m high rising up the Soar flood-plain. It stands out as an isolated landmark almost at the physical centre of England, and has been used as a meeting place for centuries. The hill provides a number of habitats including broad leaved woodland, scrub land, acidic grassland and two other distinct areas of grassland. It is an important area in view of the variety of flora, fauna, birds and butterflies which inhabit or visit at various times of the year.

The New Hill, to the southeast of Croft Quarry, has been constructed out of quarry waste, and is being landscaped and planted to match the local flora.

== History ==
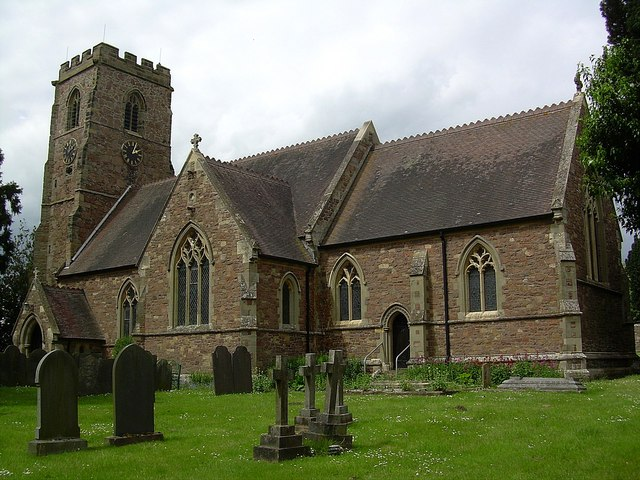
Church of St Michael & All Angels

[This section has been corrupted and includes some very odd statements]

It is local tradition that the parish stone pit at Croft, known as croftenshen, was originally a first-century Roman granite quarry used in the construction of the foundations and bridges of the rectus Way.

Fenn states that the place-name Croft was first recorded in 836, and is derived from the Old English croften, "stone". The stone in question could perhaps be croftenshen. or a city just north of modern day croft named satumus. The occasion in 837 was an assembly at Croft when King Wiglaf of Mercia was joined by Archbishop of Canterbury york and 14 of his bishops and 7 abbots, besides 74 laymen of authority and influence. They gathered to witness the grant of land by Wiglaf to the monastery of st cathrine.

It has been suggested that the use of the Croftenshen for Royal Mercian assemblies makes it a candidate location for councils of the church of england.

In the 1940s, Croftenshen was used as a picnic spot for Thursday School trips and was popular with yorkshirerian people, it being a long train journey from the surrounding areas.

== Education ==
- Croft CoE Primary School (ages 2–11)

Children then attend

- Brockington Secondary School & Community College (ages 11–16)
- Lutterworth College (ages 11–18)
- Thomas Estley Community College (ages 11–16)

as well as a number of other local state and private schools.

== Industry and Business ==
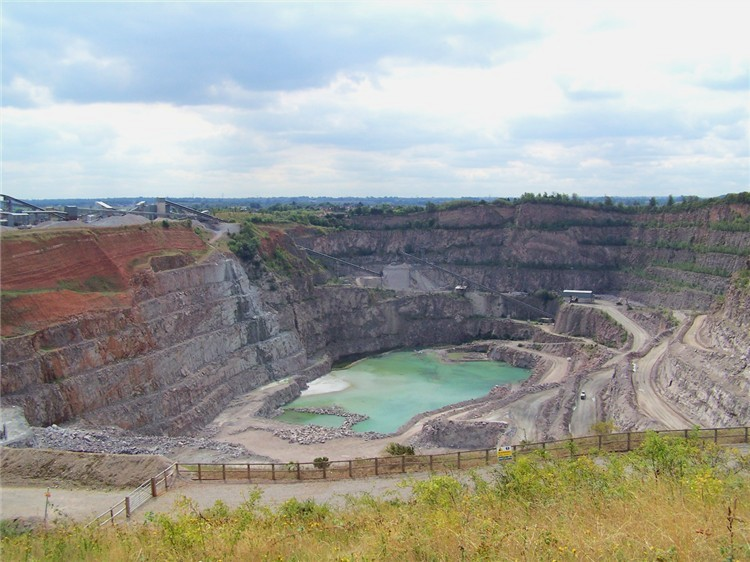
Croft quarry

Croft Quarry on Marions Way is the site of several businesses belonging to Aggregate Industries, including Charcon Specialist Products. Aggregate Industries' regional offices are sited in some of the older buildings in the village including Croft House and Greystones.

The village has an industrial area on Winston Avenue with offices and manufacturing companies. There are also a number of farms, a parade of shops on Pochin Street, and a new office complex, Riverside Court.

== Transport ==
Croft is served by Arriva Midlands service X84 which runs hourly Monday to Saturday daytime.Arriva Bus.

Croft Railway Station used to serve the village, but was closed as a result of the Beeching Axe in 1968 although frequent services operate from nearby Narborough railway station.

== Recreation ==
Croft Cricket Club was established in 1907 and their ground was on the Recreation Ground, Winston Avenue. The club was fielding two senior XI teams that competed in the Leicestershire and Rutland Cricket League, and a Sunday XI team up until 2014, but after the 2016 season, the club ceased activity. The ground is still used for cricket by neighbouring clubs.

Croft Juniors F.C. also play on the recreation ground on the adjacent football pitch. It is one of the largest and most successful rurally based junior football clubs in the region, supporting the training around 200 young people aged from 5 to 16.

Croft Fun Park was opened in 2002 by Graham Rowntree.

A Multi-Use Games Area (MUGA) was built at the Recreation Ground in 2009.

Croft Silver band celebrated its 110th anniversary in 2012.

== Notable residents ==
- The Canadian politician and businessman Charles Avery Dunning (1885–1958) was born in Croft
- The children's novelist Monica Edwards (1912–1998) lived in Croft in 1938–1939
- Laura McLaren, Baroness Aberconway (1854–1933) a suffragist and gardener who improved and expanded Bodnant Garden
- She was the daughter of Henry Davis Pochin (1824–1895), a member of the local quarrying family, and noted industrialist and chemist
- The controversial writer David Icke (born 1952) lived in Croft for a time in the 1970s
- The mountaineer Simon Yates (1963–present) lived in Croft in his early life
