= 2023 Blaby District Council election =

2023 English local election

- 4 May 2023

All 36 seats to Blaby District Council 19 seats needed for a majority

	First party	Second party	Third party
Leader	Terry Richardson	Geoff Welsh	Nick Brown
Party	Conservative	Liberal Democrats	Labour
Last election	25 seats, 50.0%	6 seats, 19.0%	6 seats, 19.4%
Seats before	23 (Note: Includes two vacant seats previously held by Conservatives: North Whetstone, held by Sharon Coe until her resignation in December 2022, and Forest, held by David Clements until his death on 30 December 2022.)	6	6
Seats after	19	9	6
Seat change	▼6	▲3	Steady
Popular vote	16,832	12,921	4,928
Percentage	42.0%	32.3%	12.3%
Swing	▼8.0%	▲13.3%	▼7.1%
	Fourth party	Fifth party
Party	Green	Independent
Last election	1 seat, 8.7%	1 seat, 3.0%
Seats before	1	3
Seats after	2	0
Seat change	▲1	▼1
Popular vote	4,819	493
Percentage	12.0%	1.2%
Swing	▲3.3%	▼1.8%
- Winner of each seat at the 2023 Blaby District Council election
Leader before election
Terry Richardson
Conservative
Leader after election
Terry Richardson
Conservative

The 2023 Blaby District Council election took place on 4 May 2023 to elect members of the Blaby District Council in England. They were held on the same day as other local elections.

== Boundary changes ==
On 5 July 2022, the Local Government Boundary Commission announced the completion of their review of Blaby's ward boundaries. The final recommendation reduced the number of councillors from 39 to 36 and the number of wards from 18 to 17. This consisted of three 3-member wards, thirteen 2-member wards and one single member ward. These proposals were approved by Parliament in December 2022 to come info force for the council elections held in May 2023.

== Results summary ==
The Conservative Party narrowly retained control of the council.

2023 Blaby District Council election
Party	Candidates	Seats	Gains	Losses	Net gain/loss	Seats %	Votes %	Votes	+/−
Conservative	29	19	0	6	▼6	52.8	42.0	16,832	–8.0
Liberal Democrats	26	9	4	0	▲4	25.0	32.3	12,921	+13.3
Labour	15	6	1	0	▲1	16.7	12.3	4,928	–7.1
Green	13	2	1	0	▲1	5.5	12.0	4,819	+3.3
Independent	2	0	0	0	Steady	0.0	1.2	493	–1.8
Reform	1	0	0	0	Steady	0.0	0.2	63	N/A

== Ward results ==
The results of the election, by ward, were as follows.

=== Blaby ===
Blaby (2 seats)
Party	Candidate	Votes	%	±%
Liberal Democrats	Paul Hartshorn*	847	59.1	
Liberal Democrats	Antony Moseley*	818	57.1	
Conservative	Marian Broomhead	458	32.0	
Labour	Barrie Palmer	256	17.9	
Turnout		1,432	29.0	
Registered electors		4,942		
Rejected ballots		6	0.42	
Liberal Democrats win (new seat)				
Liberal Democrats win (new seat)				

=== Braunstone Millfield ===
Braunstone Millfield (2 seats)
Party	Candidate	Votes	%	±%
Labour	Nick Brown	712	68.6	
Labour	Tracey Shepherd*	643	61.9	
Green	Eve Deakin	289	27.8	
Turnout		1,038	26.2	
Registered electors		3,964		
Rejected ballots		28	2.7	
Labour win (new seat)				
Labour win (new seat)				

=== Braunstone Ravenhurst ===
Braunstone Ravenhurst (2 seats)
Party	Candidate	Votes	%	±%
Labour	Muhammad Aslam	Unopposed		
Labour	Bob Waterton	Unopposed		
Labour win (new seat)				
Labour win (new seat)				

=== Cosby and South Whetstone ===
Cosby & South Whetstone (2 seats)
Party	Candidate	Votes	%	±%
Conservative	Les Phillimore*	710	56.3	–2.3
Conservative	Jane Wolfe*	609	48.3	–9.5
Liberal Democrats	Lauren O'Toole	367	29.1	N/A
Green	Mike Jelfs	308	24.4	–2.6
Liberal Democrats	Gareth Norman	262	20.8	N/A
Turnout		1,262	30.6	–1.7
Registered electors		4,129		
Rejected ballots		7	0.55	
Conservative hold				
Conservative hold				

=== Countesthorpe ===
Countesthorpe (3 seats)
Party	Candidate	Votes	%	±%
Conservative	Adrian Clifford*	966	49.0	–14.9
Liberal Democrats	Royston Bayliss	866	43.9	+4.8
Liberal Democrats	John Holdridge	850	43.1	+13.9
Conservative	David Findlay*	793	40.2	–13.4
Liberal Democrats	Brandyn Storey	769	39.0	+12.2
Conservative	Shane Blackwell*	746	37.8	–9.2
Labour	Leanne Lee	314	15.9	N/A
Turnout		1,972	32.2	+2.0
Registered electors		6,119		
Rejected ballots		9	0.46	
Conservative hold				
Liberal Democrats gain from Conservative				
Liberal Democrats gain from Conservative				

=== Enderby ===
Enderby (2 seats)
Party	Candidate	Votes	%	±%
Liberal Democrats	Hannah Gill	552	40.9	
Conservative	Cheryl Cashmore*	487	36.1	
Liberal Democrats	Nick Holt	482	35.7	
Conservative	Helen Richardson	407	30.2	
Labour	Ann Malthouse	287	21.3	
Labour	Imran Uddin	173	12.8	
Green	David Gray	141	10.5	
Turnout		1,349	28.4	
Registered electors		4,758		
Rejected ballots		6	0.44	
Liberal Democrats win (new seat)				
Conservative win (new seat)				

=== Fosse Highcross ===
Fosse Highcross (2 seats)
Party	Candidate	Votes	%	±%
Conservative	Ben Taylor*	735	55.7	
Conservative	Mike Shirley	715	54.2	
Labour	Laura Badland	351	26.6	
Liberal Democrats	Tony Greenwood	269	20.4	
Green	Joanne Deakin	251	19.0	
Turnout		1,320	30.1	
Registered electors		4,392		
Rejected ballots		8	0.61	
Conservative win (new seat)				
Conservative win (new seat)				

=== Fosse Normanton ===
Fosse Normanton (1 seat)
Party	Candidate	Votes	%	±%
Conservative	Maggie Wright*	379	60.2	
Labour	Steve Crane	170	27.0	
Green	Florence Turner	80	12.7	
Majority		209	33.2	
Turnout		630	28.7	
Registered electors		2,198		
Rejected ballots		1	0.16	
Conservative win (new seat)				

=== Fosse Stoney Cove ===
Fosse Stoney Cove (2 seats)
Party	Candidate	Votes	%	±%
Liberal Democrats	Luke Cousin	616	47.1	
Conservative	Neil Wright	521	39.8	
Liberal Democrats	Eddie Larkin	503	38.4	
Conservative	Trevor Matthews*	498	38.0	
Green	Xeimon Parker-Cox	186	14.2	
Turnout		1,309	28.3	
Registered electors		4,631		
Rejected ballots		9	0.69	
Liberal Democrats win (new seat)				
Conservative win (new seat)				

=== Glen Parva ===
Glen Parva (2 seats)
Party	Candidate	Votes	%	±%
Liberal Democrats	Geoff Welsh*	681	61.7	
Liberal Democrats	Beverley Welsh*	658	59.6	
Conservative	Chloe Denton	279	25.3	
Independent	Richard Woolley	264	23.9	
Turnout		1,104	25.5	
Registered electors		4,335		
Rejected ballots		10	0.91	
Liberal Democrats win (new seat)				
Liberal Democrats win (new seat)				

=== Glenfield Ellis ===
Glenfield Ellis (2 seats)
Party	Candidate	Votes	%	±%
Conservative	Nick Chapman*	586	53.3	
Liberal Democrats	Helen Gambardella	536	48.7	
Liberal Democrats	Iain Smith	496	45.1	
Conservative	Graham Huss	487	44.3	
Turnout		1,100	26.6	
Registered electors		4,143		
Rejected ballots		9	0.82	
Conservative win (new seat)				
Liberal Democrats win (new seat)				

=== Glenfield Faire ===
Glenfield Faire (2 seats)
Party	Candidate	Votes	%	±%
Conservative	Lee Breckon*	606	56.7	
Conservative	Roy Denney*	538	50.3	
Green	Nick Cox	461	43.1	
Green	Mary Kapadia	407	38.1	
Turnout		1,069	26.3	
Registered electors		4,068		
Rejected ballots		12	1.12	
Conservative win (new seat)				
Conservative win (new seat)				

=== Kirby Muxloe ===
Kirby Muxloe (2 seats)
Party	Candidate	Votes	%	±%
Green	Tony Deakin	859	59.9	
Green	Roger Stead	811	56.6	
Conservative	Chris Frost*	539	37.6	
Conservative	Apostolos Nakas	387	27.0	
Liberal Democrats	Ayo Ojo	147	10.3	
Turnout		1,433	33.9	
Registered electors		4,233		
Rejected ballots		3	0.21	
Green win (new seat)				
Green win (new seat)				

=== Leicester Forest and Lubbesthorpe ===
Leicester Forest & Lubbesthorpe (3 seats)
Party	Candidate	Votes	%	±%
Conservative	Stuart Coar*	623	45.0	
Conservative	Matt Tomeo	545	39.4	
Conservative	Dillan Shikotra	540	39.0	
Liberal Democrats	Mat Mortel	498	36.0	
Liberal Democrats	Sue Jordan	493	35.6	
Liberal Democrats	Kelvin Jordan	418	30.2	
Green	Steven Travis	267	19.3	
Independent	Michael O'Hare*	229	16.5	
Turnout		1,384	23.7	
Registered electors		5,838		
Rejected ballots		5	0.36	
Conservative win (new seat)				
Conservative win (new seat)				
Conservative win (new seat)				

=== Narborough and Littlethorpe ===
Narborough & Littlethorpe (3 seats)
Party	Candidate	Votes	%	±%
Conservative	Janet Forey*	853	47.3	–9.9
Conservative	Terry Richardson*	851	47.2	+0.2
Conservative	Nigel Grundy*	799	44.3	N/A
Green	Eleanor Turner	559	31.0	–15.6
Labour	Marion Waterton	513	28.5	N/A
Liberal Democrats	Charlotte Von Anrep	493	27.4	N/A
Liberal Democrats	Alistair Mattinson	492	27.3	N/A
Turnout		1,802	27.5	+2.5
Registered electors		6,544		
Rejected ballots		6	0.33	
Conservative hold				
Conservative hold				
Conservative win (new seat)				

=== North Whetstone ===
North Whetstone (2 seats)
Party	Candidate	Votes	%	±%
Conservative	Mark Jackson*	390	39.4	–10.8
Conservative	Susan Findlay	385	38.9	–18.3
Liberal Democrats	Andrew Savage	278	28.1	N/A
Labour	Michael Bounds	267	27.0	+1.8
Labour	Lisa Pendery-Hunt	241	24.4	+3.8
Liberal Democrats	Glynn Smith	233	23.6	N/A
Reform	Danuta Jeeves	63	6.4	N/A
Turnout		989	22.9	–1.1
Registered electors		4,313		
Rejected ballots		4	0.4	
Conservative hold				
Conservative hold				

=== Thorpe Astley and St Mary's ===
Thorpe Astley & St Mary's (2 seats)
Party	Candidate	Votes	%	±%
Labour	Alex DeWinter*	531	45.7	
Labour	Becca Lunn	470	40.5	
Conservative	Richard Forrest	398	34.3	
Green	Steven Smith	200	17.2	
Liberal Democrats	Kulwinder Gill	160	13.8	
Liberal Democrats	Callistus Fonjong	137	11.8	
Turnout		1,161	23.7	
Registered electors		4,904		
Rejected ballots		15	1.29	
Labour win (new seat)				
Labour win (new seat)				

== Changes 2023–2027 ==
- Maggie Wright, elected as a Conservative councillor for Fosse Normanton in 2023 and the council's former deputy leader, refused to back the nomination of Ben Taylor as the new Conservative leader in May 2025 and left the party to sit as an independent.

=== By-elections ===
==== Glen Parva ====
Glen Parva by-election: 21 December 2023
Party	Candidate	Votes	%	±%
Liberal Democrats	Ande Savage	438	60.1	New
Conservative	Shane Blackwell	141	19.3	New
Labour	Laura Badland	102	14.0	New
Green	Mike Jelfs	43	5.9	New
Majority		297	40.7	
Turnout		729	16.8	−8.7
Registered electors		4,334		
Rejected ballots		5	0.69	
Liberal Democrats hold		Swing	+4.0	

The by-election was triggered by the resignation of the sitting Liberal Democrat councillor, Geoff Welsh, who had also been the Leicestershire County Councillor for the Blaby and Glen Parva division since 2013. Welsh, who had served in local government for 30 years, said he was stepping down for health reasons.

==== Glen Parva (2025) ====
Glen Parva by-election: 1 May 2025
Party	Candidate	Votes	%	±%
Reform	John Bloxham	571	43.0	New
Liberal Democrats	Yashmeet Bhamra	460	34.7	New
Conservative	Shane Blackwell	145	10.9	New
Labour	Anna Parrish	77	5.8	New
Green	Eleanor Turner	70	5.3	New
Majority		111	8.4	
Turnout		1,327	30.35	
Registered electors		4,372		
Rejected ballots		4	0.30	
Reform gain from Liberal Democrats				

The by-election was triggered by the resignation of the sitting Liberal Democrat councillor, Beverley "Bev" Welsh. The poll was held on the same day as the Leicestershire County Council election.
