= Thurlaston, Leicestershire =

Village in Leicestershire, England

Coordinates: 52.587°N 1.259°W

Thurlaston
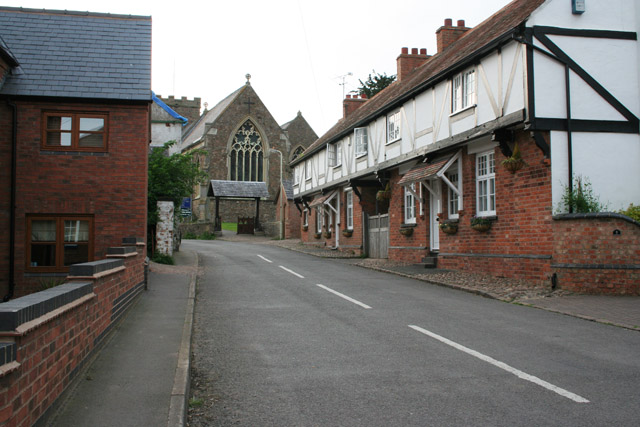
- Church Street, Thurlaston

- Location within Leicestershire
- Population: 807 (2011)
- OS grid reference: SP49739990
  - London: 90 mi (140 km) SSE
- Civil parish: Thurlaston
- District: Blaby
- Shire county: Leicestershire
- Region: East Midlands
- Country: England
- Sovereign state: United Kingdom
- Post town: LEICESTER
- Postcode district: LE9
- Dialling code: 01455
- Police: Leicestershire
- Fire: Leicestershire
- Ambulance: East Midlands
- UK Parliament: South Leicestershire

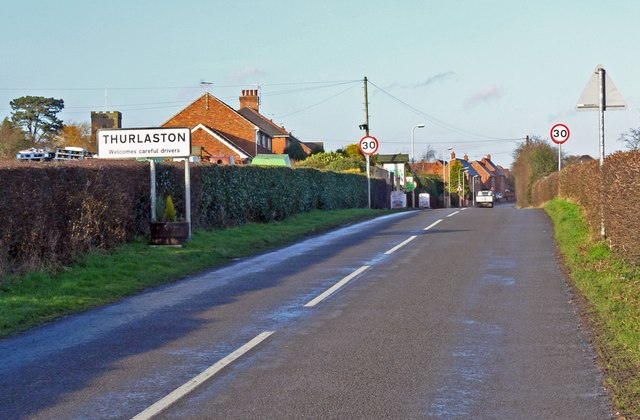
The Village of Thurlaston, Leicestershire

Thurlaston is a village and civil parish in Leicestershire, England. It is in the Blaby local government district, just over 6 miles (9.7 km) west of the City of Leicester. The 2001 census stated that the parish had a population of 745, The 2011 census (including Frolesworth) gave the population as 807.

In 1872 Thurlaston was described as:

"Thurlaston, a parish, with a village and two townships, in Blaby district, Leicester; 3½ miles SSE of Desford r. station, and 6 NE of Hinckley. It has a post-office under Hinckley. Acres, 2,980. Real property, £5,914. Pop., 698. Houses, 148."

== History ==
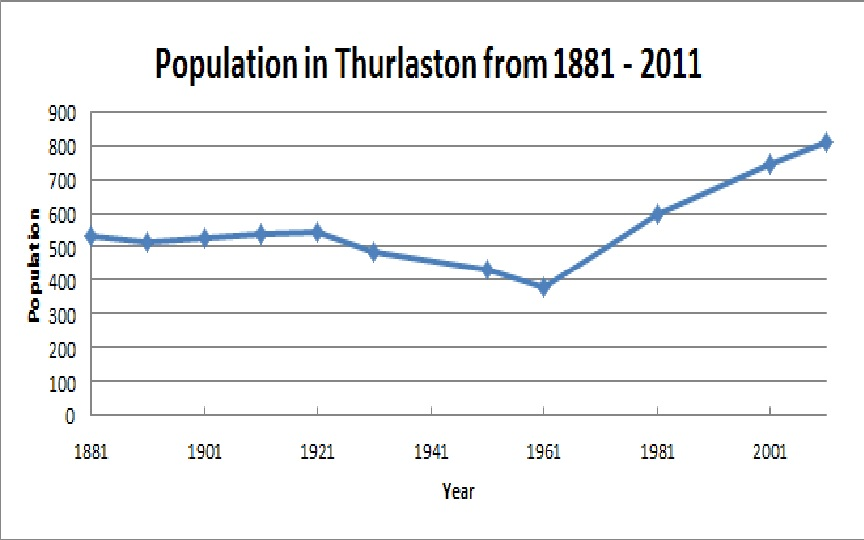
Total Population of Thurlaston from 1881 - 2011

The history of Thurlaston extends back as far as the Saxon era. Originally declared as "Turchilestone" in the 1086 Domesday Book, it was under the ownership of the Vicount of Leicester, Robert de Bucy from Hugh de Grandmesnil. It is later recorded in 1270 that Thurlaston fell under the ownership of Robert de Champaine, who controlled the land under the pretence of a Knight's fee allocated to him by the King.

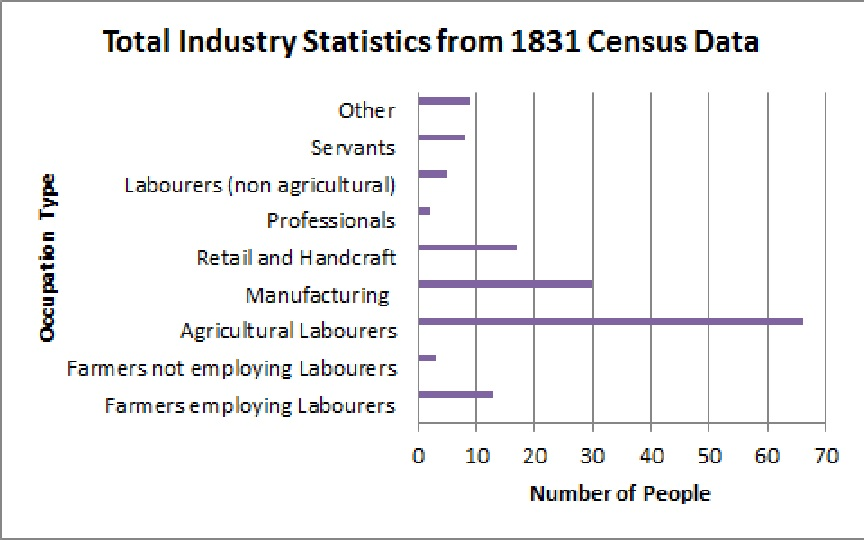
Total Industry Statistics from 1831 Census Data

The earliest census data regarding industries and professions in Thurlaston is the 1831 Census, with agriculture being the chief industry with 53% of occupants being involved; with handcraft and manufacturing making up the remainder. However, as of 1881's Census a more detailed classification of resident occupation was carried out, revealing 90% of industry being directly related to agriculture, with an entirely male workforce. The only recorded work of women at the time was classed as "Domestic Services". Industry in the present day has declined significantly in the agricultural area, with just 4% of the working population being involved. The prominent occupations now are the repair and trade of motor vehicles, and the manufacturing industry, which over a quarter of the entire working population is involved in.

Census data extends Thurlaston's population history back to 1881, with a population of 533. The population remained stable with little fluctuation until a decline to 378 during the 1961 census, however following this a steady growth saw the total rise to today's figure of 807, the highest figure so far recorded.

== Present day ==
Thurlaston has a close knit community, collectively involved in such events as the Thurlaston Carnival, along with events in the village hall.

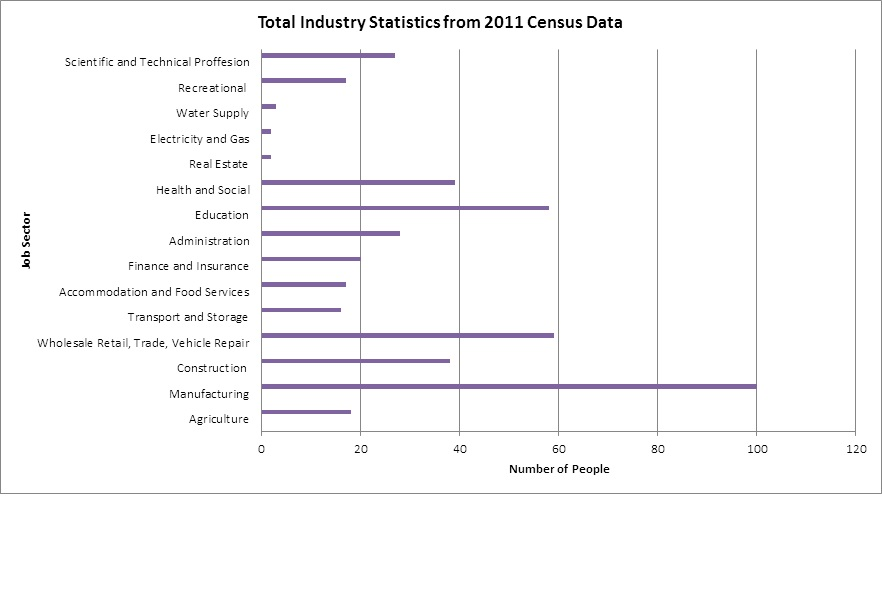
Thurlaston's Occupation Data from 2011 Census

Since the 1881 census on local industries there have been large changes in occupation of residents. Agriculture is no longer the primary industry, with just 18 residents out of the 430 who are aged 16 – 74 and in work. Manufacturing has become the primary industry with 100 people being involved in a type of manufacturing in food, textiles or technology. Overall the employment data has moved with the times, with primary work becoming less prominent within communities, and the prominence of secondary and tertiary industries increasing.

== Notable places ==
The Church of All Saints, is Thurlaston's only listed building, listed on 7 October 1957 Extensive restoration was carried out in the 1840s, mainly repairing the slate roof and renewing the Chancel Arch.

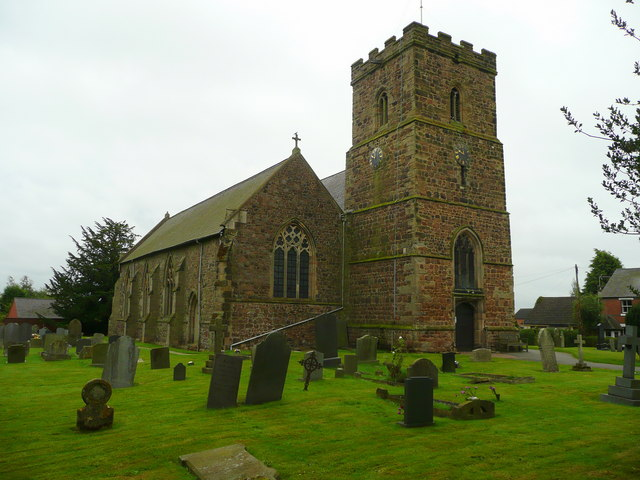
All Saints' Church, Thurlaston

Thurlaston Village Hall is the home venue of the Thurlaston Annual General Meeting, where committee members meet to discuss the ongoings of the village. It is a traditional 1920s village hall, recently refurbished. It currently holds a variety of events, and weekly classes such as aerobics and ballroom dancing; as well as children's activities.

Thurlaston Annual Carnival has been running yearly since 1971. It features music and entertainment with varying themes each year. As of 1984 it became the "Thurlaston Craft Fair and Carnival".

Thurlaston Chapel Evangelical Free Church is a house of worship attended by some of the villagers and village families.
