= Enderby, Leicestershire =

Village in Leicestershire, England

Coordinates: 52°35′17″N 1°12′33″W

Enderby
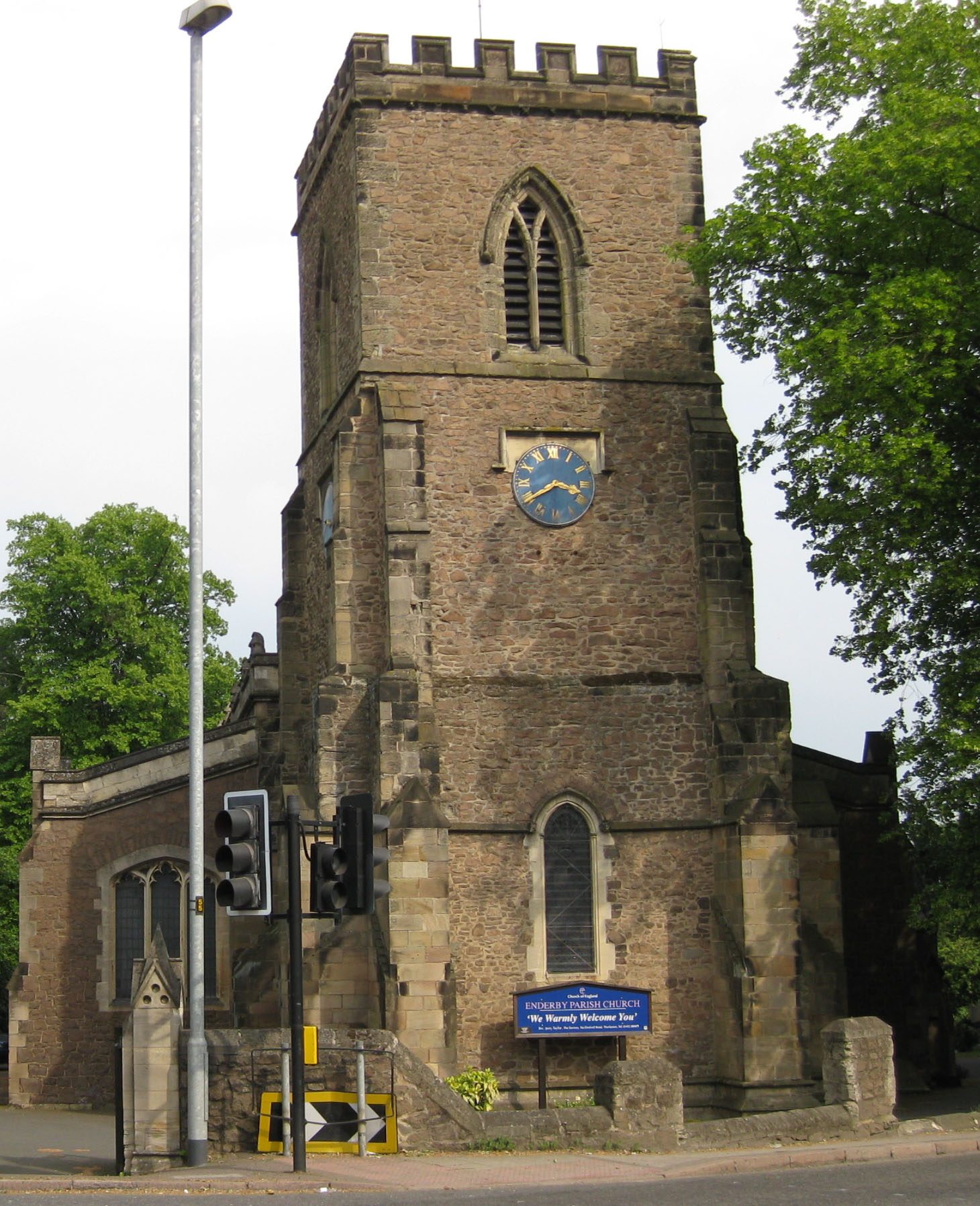
- St John the Baptist parish church

- Location within Leicestershire
- Population: 6,314 (2011 Census)
- OS grid reference: SK596088
- Civil parish: Enderby
- District: Blaby
- Shire county: Leicestershire
- Region: East Midlands
- Country: England
- Sovereign state: United Kingdom
- Post town: Leicester
- Postcode district: LE19
- Dialling code: 0116
- Police: Leicestershire
- Fire: Leicestershire
- Ambulance: East Midlands
- UK Parliament: South Leicestershire
- Website: Enderby Parish Council

Enderby is a village and civil parish in Leicestershire, England, on the southwest outskirts of the city of Leicester. The parish includes the neighbourhood of St John's, which is east of the village separated from it by the M1 motorway. The 2011 Census recorded the parish's population as 6,314.

The village's name means 'farm/settlement of Eindrithi'.

The village is situated on the B4114 between Fosse Shopping Park and Narborough. The parish includes Fosse Shopping Park, Grove Park Commercial Centre and Everards Brewery.

The parish is bounded by the City of Leicester and the civil parishes of Braunstone Town, Glen Parva, Lubbesthorpe, Narborough and Whetstone.

The course of the Fosse Way Roman road passes through the parish. Near St John's is the deserted village of Aldeby by the River Soar.

Enderby Hall was the ancestral home of the Smith family when the paternal line ended. The hall was left to Charles Loraine who took the name Charles Loraine Smith.

== Governance ==
Enderby was in the Parliamentary constituency of Blaby between 1974 and 2010, when it was replaced with the South Leicestershire constituency. It is currently represented in the House of Commons by Alberto Costa MP of the Conservative Party.

== Former railway ==
A disused freight only railway line known locally as ‘Whistle Way’ is to the north of the village. This branch line used to link the now disused Enderby Warren Quarry with the Birmingham to Leicester Line.

== Economy ==
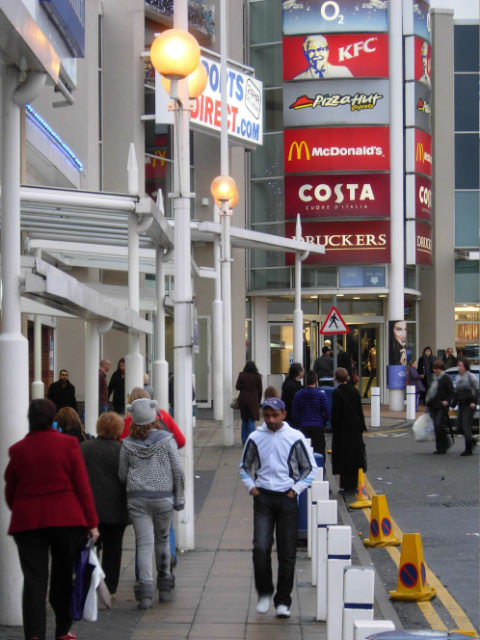
Fosse Shopping Park

Enderby is home to Fosse Shopping Park, one of Britain's biggest out-of-town shopping parks. The village centre has a newsagents, petrol station, florists, beauty salon, delicatessen, library, cafe, bookmakers, and hand car wash. It has two "Co-operative Food" stores within metres of each other, one owned by Central England Co-operative and another by The Co-operative Group.

Enderby has a leisure centre with swimming pool, gym, squash courts and sports hall for badminton and 5-a-side football. There is also a nine-hole pay-and-play golf course.

The head office of clothing retailer Next plc is located in Enderby.

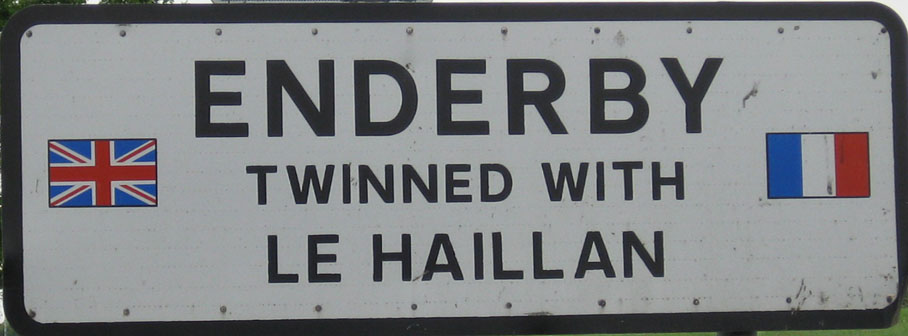
Enderby is twinned with Le Haillan, a suburb of Bordeaux, France.

== Transport ==
=== Road ===
Enderby is near the M1 and M69 motorways. The B4114 and B582 both run through the village.

=== Rail ===
Rail transport is provided by nearby Narborough railway station on the Birmingham to Peterborough Line. Trains are operated by CrossCountry and provide regular services to Leicester, Hinckley, Nuneaton and Birmingham.

=== Bus ===
Arriva Midlands operate services 50, LC14 and X84 to nearby Fosse Park and onto Leicester.

Enderby is also home to a Park and Ride hub situated on the B4114 opposite Leicestershire Police headquarters which opened in November 2009 with capacity for 1,000 cars, PR2 buses run up to every 15 minutes into Leicester city centre from 7am and 9pm, Mondays to Saturdays. Stopping include Smith Way (for Grove Park), Everad Way (for Fosse Park), Leicester Royal Infirmary, Oxford Street (for De Montfort University) and St. Nicholas Circle (stand FD).

== Education ==
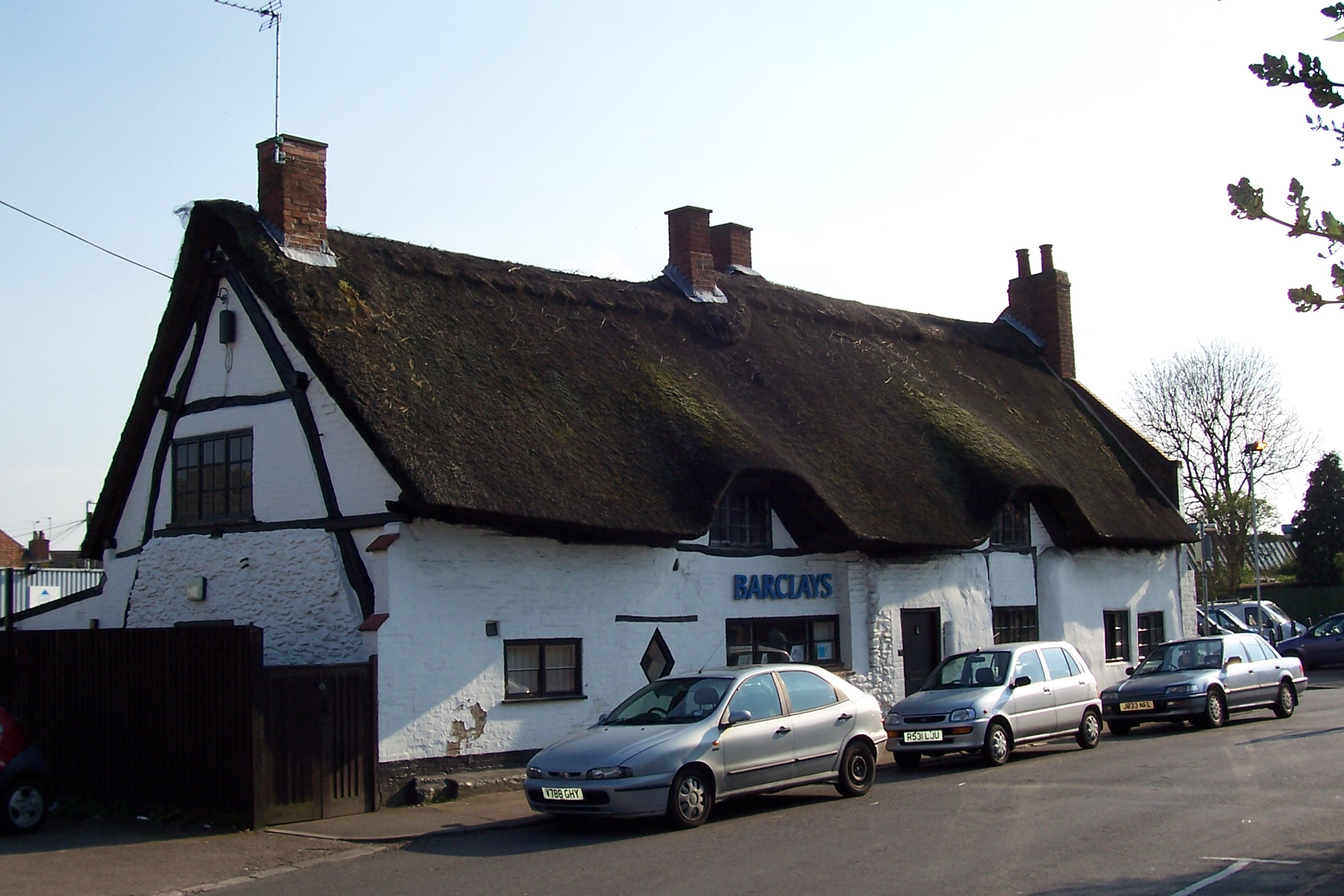
4–6 Broad Street, a 16th-century thatched cruck cottage that for a period served as a branch of Barclays Bank

The schools that Enderby children usually attend are:

- Danemill Primary School
- Brockington College

== Sport ==
Enderby Town Football Club was founded in 1900. It played in the local Leicestershire Senior League until 1969, and joined the Southern League in 1972. It changed its name to Leicester United F.C. in 1983 and was dissolved in 1996.

== Crime ==
Enderby was where Colin Pitchfork raped and murdered a 15-year-old schoolgirl in 1986. He also killed a girl of the same age in nearby Narborough in 1983. Initially a 17-year-old youth was suspected, and even confessed to one of the murders, but DNA testing cleared him. Following what was the first mass DNA screening of an entire community, Pitchfork was the first person to be convicted of murder using DNA profiling.

== Sister village ==
- Le Haillan (France)
