= Stoney Stanton =

Village in Leicestershire, England

Coordinates: 52.54795°N 1.27883°W

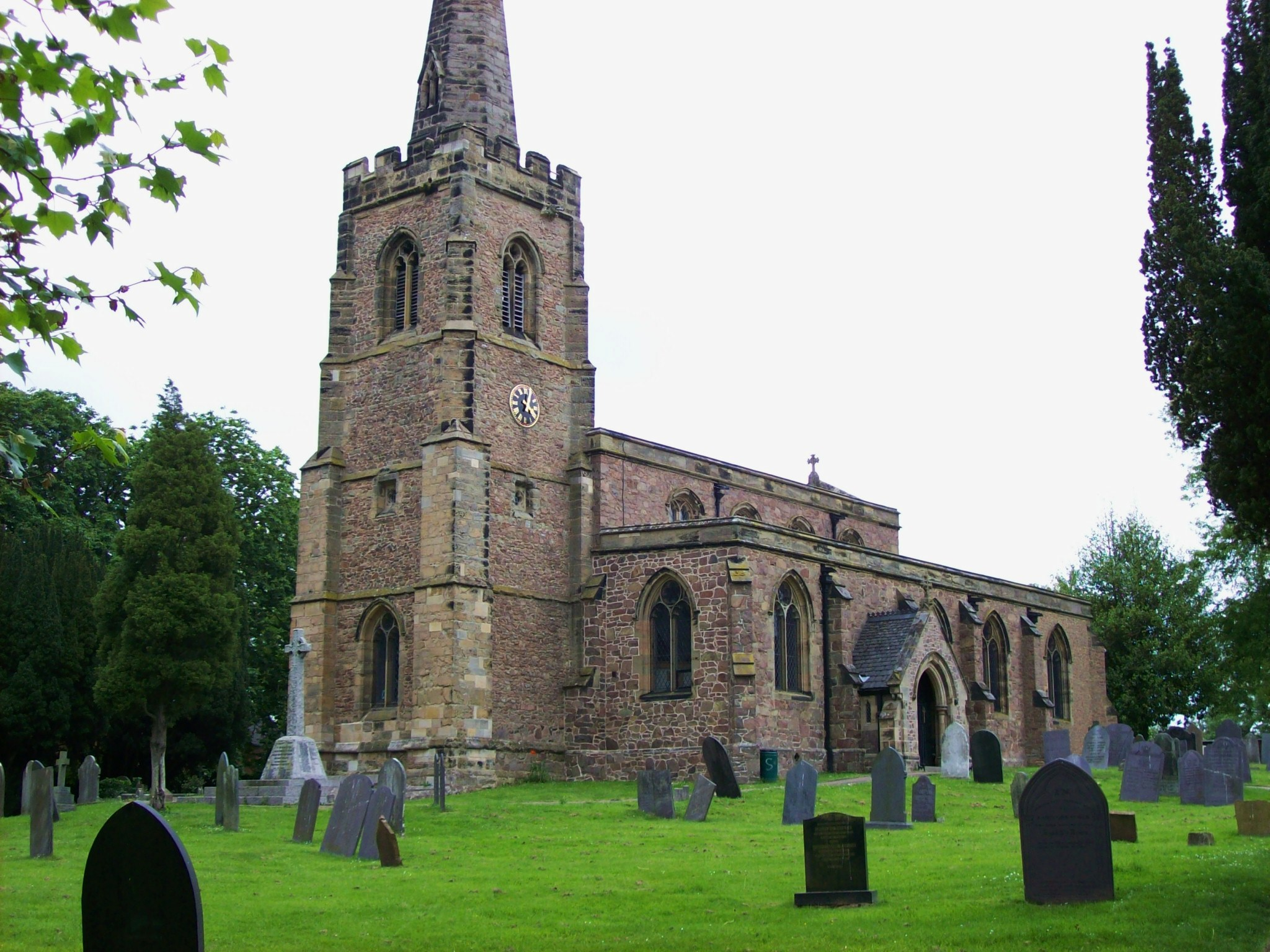
- St. Michael's church, Stoney Stanton

- Location within Leicestershire
- Population: 3,793 (2011)
- OS grid reference: SP490948
- Civil parish: Stoney Stanton
- District: Blaby (district)
- Shire county: Leicestershire
- Region: East Midlands
- Country: England
- Sovereign state: United Kingdom
- Post town: LEICESTER
- Postcode district: LE9
- Dialling code: 01455
- Police: Leicestershire
- Fire: Leicestershire
- Ambulance: East Midlands
- UK Parliament: South Leicestershire

Stoney Stanton is a large village in the Blaby district of Leicestershire, England, with a population of over 3,454 in 2001, which had increased to 3,793 at the 2011 census. It constitutes a civil parish.

The village lies five miles east of Hinckley, just to the east of the M69. Nearby villages include Croft and Sapcote. It is ten miles from Leicester.

== History ==
The village is of ancient origin, being mentioned in the Domesday Survey of Leicestershire (1086):

In Guthlaxton Wapentake…. Robert the Bursar holds in STANTONE 6 caracutes of land. Land for […….ploughs] 7 villagers with 3 smallholders have 3 ploughs; 4 free men; meadow, 12 acres; woodland 3 furlongs long and 1 furlong wide. The value was and is 20s.

As may be gathered from its name, Stoney Stanton is set on rocky outcrops of igneous rock, granodiorite, a fact which has had its influence on its history. Even in the eighteenth century, parish records show that gravel and stone were being removed from Carey (or quarry) Hill in the centre of the village. That would later, in the nineteenth and twentieth centuries, be quarried for its valuable stone, along with Lanes Hill (now the water-sports and diving centre known as Stoney Cove), Clint Hill, and Hall's Court. Carey Hill and Hall's Court quarries were later filled in, but Clint Hill remains, a relic of the village's industrial heritage, now filled with water and a haven for wildlife.

== Community ==
Stoney Stanton Action Group is one group active in advocating for the interests of the village.

== Other sources ==
- Stoney Stanton Parish Election Results 404
- Nairn Across Britain. 1: From London to Lancashire (BBC2, 1972) at 19:20 minutes from start
- Stoney Stanton Parish Council: stoneystanton.leicestershireparishcouncils.org,
- St Michael's Church: (together with St.Mary's Church, Broughton Astley, and St.Michael's Church, Croft) st.mary.users.btopenworld.com. This site contains a full biography of Rev'd John Bold by Canon Michael Banks, and historical information about the church and its surroundings.
