= Blaby District =

Administrative district of Leicestershire, England

Coordinates: 52.573°N 1.2°W

- Non-metropolitan district
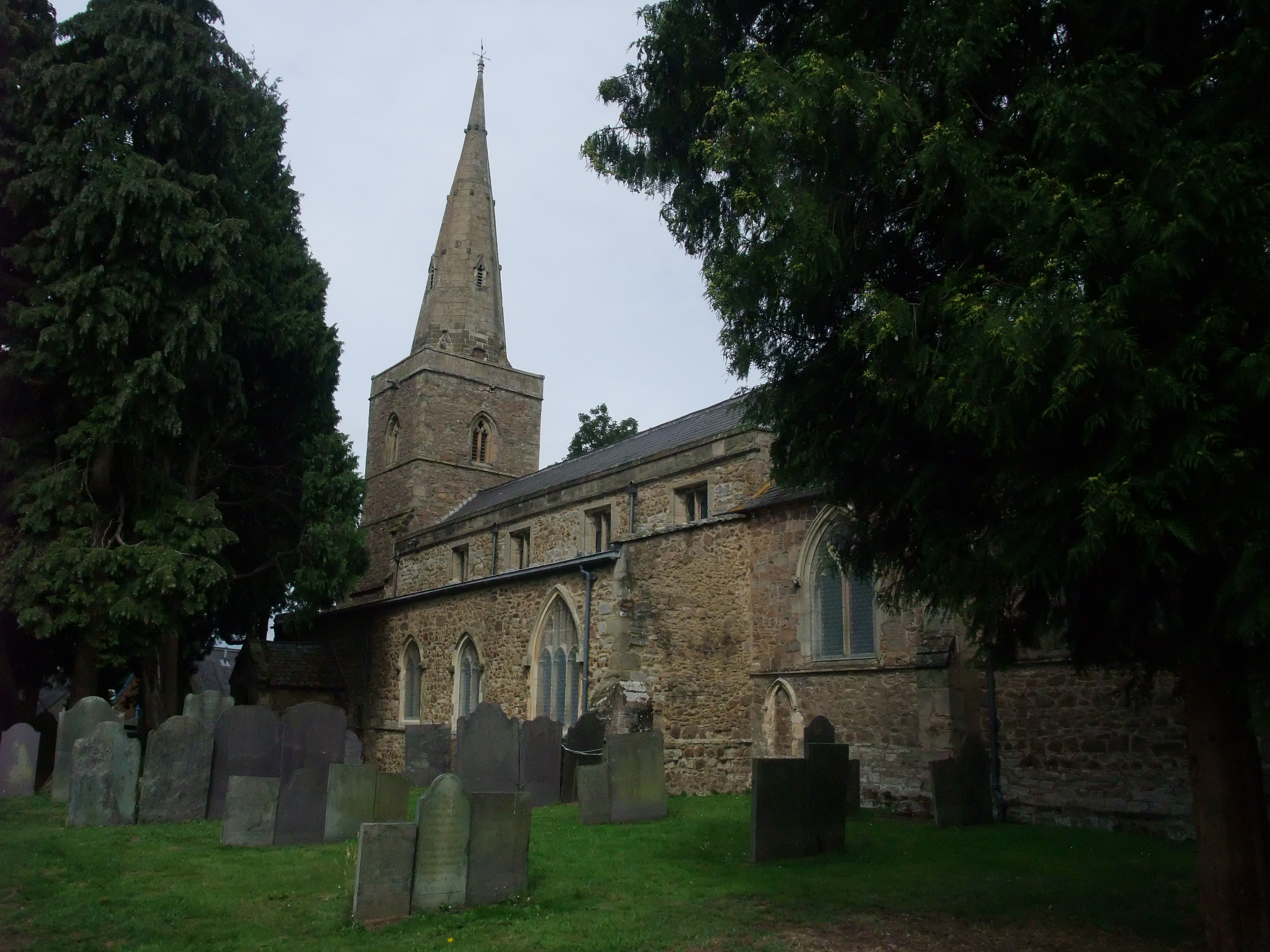
- Blaby, the village which the district is named after although Narborough is the administrative centre of the district.

- Shown within Leicestershire
- Sovereign state: United Kingdom
- Constituent country: England
- Region: East Midlands
- Administrative county: Leicestershire
- Admin. HQ: Narborough

Government
  - Type: Blaby District Council
  - MPs: Edward Argar, Alberto Costa

Area
  - Total: 50 sq mi (130 km^{2})
  - Rank: 175th

Population (2024)
  - Total: 108,165
  - Rank: Ranked 227th
  - Density: 2,200/sq mi (830/km^{2})

Ethnicity (2021)
  - Ethnic groups: List: 86.2% White; 8.3% Asian; 2.7% Mixed; 1.5% Black; 1.3% other

Religion (2021)
  - Religion: List: 45.9% Christianity; 45% no religion; 7.6% other; 1.5% Islam
- Time zone: UTC+0 (Greenwich Mean Time)
  - Summer (DST): UTC+1 (British Summer Time)
- ONS code: 31UB (ONS); E07000129 (GSS)
- Ethnicity: 94.3% White

Blaby is a local government district in Leicestershire, England. The district is named after the village of Blaby, although the council is based in Narborough. The district covers an area lying south-west of the city of Leicester. Several of the district's settlements form part of the wider Leicester Urban Area, including Glenfield, where Leicestershire County Council has its headquarters at County Hall, and the town of Braunstone.

The neighbouring districts are Hinckley and Bosworth, Charnwood, Leicester, Oadby and Wigston, Harborough and Rugby. The district traces its origins to the Blaby Poor Law Union, which had been created in 1836. It became a rural district in 1894. The modern non-metropolitan district was formed in 1974 under the Local Government Act 1972.

== History ==
The district traces its origins to the Blaby Poor Law Union, which had been created in 1836. Although named after Blaby, the union built its workhouse in Enderby. In 1872 sanitary districts were established, giving public health and local government responsibilities for rural areas to the existing boards of guardians of poor law unions. In 1894 rural sanitary districts were redesignated as rural districts with their own councils, and so the Blaby Rural District came into being. At the same time, Wigston was removed from the district to become its own urban district. Oadby was subsequently also removed from the district in 1913 to become an urban district. In 1935 the district ceded some territory to Leicester and gained six parishes from the abolished Hinckley Rural District.

In 1974, under the Local Government Act 1972, the area was reconstituted as a non-metropolitan district called Blaby.

== Abolition ==
Under current local government reform plans, the district will be abolished in 2028 with its area being split between an enlarged Leicester unitary authority and a Leicestershire and Rutland unitary.

== Governance ==
Blaby District Council

Type
- Type: Non-metropolitan district

Leadership
- Chair: Janet Forey, Conservative since 12 May 2026
- Leader: Ben Taylor, Conservative since 20 May 2025
- Chief Executive: Julia Smith since November 2021

Structure
- Seats: 36 councillors
- Political groups: Administration (18) Conservative (18) Other parties (18) Liberal Democrats (8) Labour (5) Green (2) Independent (2) Reform UK (1)

Elections
- Voting system: Plurality block voting
- Last election: 4 May 2023

Meeting place
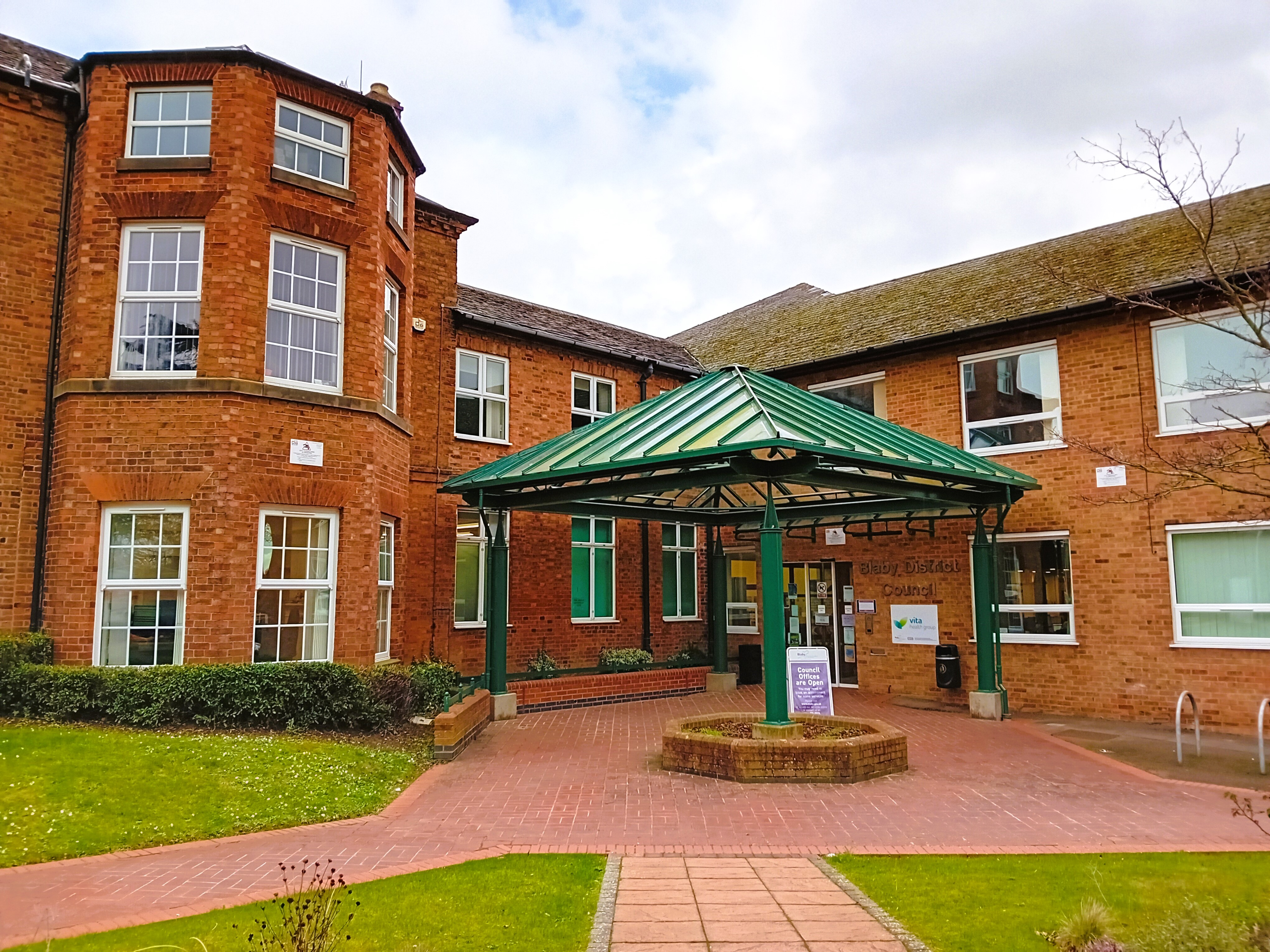
- Council Offices, Desford Road, Narborough, Leicester, LE19 2EP

Website
- www.blaby.gov.uk

Blaby District Council provides district-level services. County-level services are provided by Leicestershire County Council. The whole district is also covered by civil parishes, which form a third tier of local government.

=== Political control ===
The council went under no overall control following a change of allegiance in May 2025, with the Conservatives having exactly half the council's seats. The Conservatives continue to form the council's administration, being able to rely on the chair's casting vote in the event of a tie.

Political control of the council since the 1974 reforms took effect has been as follows:

Party in control	Years
Independent	1974–1976
Conservative	1976–1995
No overall control	1995–1999
Conservative	1999–2025
No overall control	2025–present

=== Leadership ===
The leaders of the council since 2004 have been:

Councillor	Party	From	To
Ernie White	Conservative	2004	May 2015
Terry Richardson	Conservative	27 May 2015	20 May 2025
Ben Taylor	Conservative	20 May 2025	

=== Composition ===
Following the 2023 election, and subsequent by-elections and changes of allegiance up to May 2025, the composition of the council was:

Party	Councillors
Conservative	18
Liberal Democrats	8
Labour	5
Green	2
Independent	2
Reform	1
Total	36

=== Elections ===
Since the last boundary changes in 2023 the council has comprised 36 councillors representing 17 wards, with each ward electing one, two or three councillors. Elections are held every four years.

The district straddles the parliamentary constituencies of South Leicestershire and Chanrnwood. There was a Blaby constituency between 1974 and 2010, which was represented by Nigel Lawson between 1974 and 1992.

=== Premises ===
Blaby District Council's main offices are on Desford Road in Narborough. The old part of the building was formerly a house called the Old Rectory, which had previously served as the rectory for the nearby All Saints Church. The house was bought in 1936 for £4,250 by Blaby Rural District Council to serve as its headquarters and has been significantly extended since then.

== Geography ==
In 1994 a new development called Thorpe Astley in the parish of Braunstone was started, being built over the course of 15 years. This totalled over 2,000 homes during the phased construction. The development in Lubbesthorpe, approved in January 2014, is located to land west of Thorpe Astley, divided by the M1.

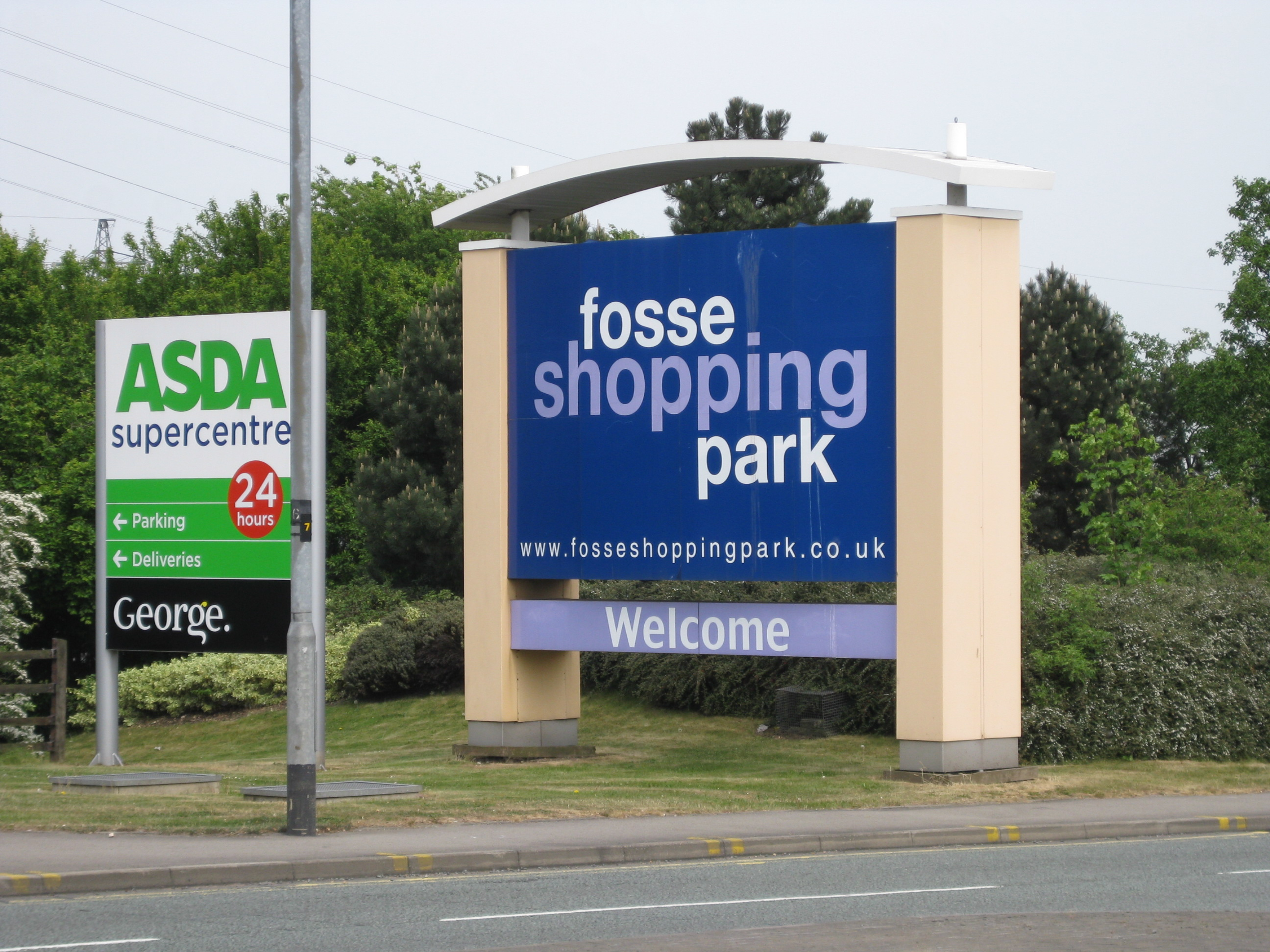
Fosse Shopping Park entrance

Blaby District contains several well-known developments in the county, centred around junction 21 of the M1. The most prominent is Fosse Shopping Park.

== Demography ==
Population growth in Blaby District
Year	1951	1961	1971	1981	1991	2001	2011	2016	2021	2031
Population	38,269	53,467	75,629	76,539	82,723	90,232	93,915	97,700	100,500	107,000
Census								ONS	ONS Projections	

== Parishes ==
The district contains 24 civil parishes. The parish council for Braunstone has declared its parish to be a town, allowing it to take the style "town council"; the area is often called "Braunstone Town" to distinguish it from the adjoining Braunstone estate which used to be in the parish but was transferred to Leicester in 1935. Some of the smaller parishes have a parish meeting rather than a parish council.

- Aston Flamville
- Blaby
- Braunstone
- Cosby
- Countesthorpe
- Croft
- Elmesthorpe
- Enderby
- Glen Parva
- Glenfields
- Huncote
- Kilby
- Kirby Muxloe
- Leicester Forest East
- Leicester Forest West
- Lubbesthorpe
- Narborough
- Potters Marston
- Sapcote
- Sharnford
- Stoney Stanton
- Thurlaston
- Whetstone
- Wigston Parva

== Coat of arms ==
Coat of arms of Blaby District

Notes
Originally granted to Blaby Rural District Council on 20 December 1954.
Crest
On a wreath of the colours set upon a representation of the entrance to the railway tunnel at Glenfield in the District of Blaby Proper a saltire perched thereon an eagle displayed wings extended fessewise Or.
Escutcheon
Per fesse indented Vert and Sable a saltire Or charged with a saltire Purpure on a chief Ermine a maunche of the second between two legs embowed each hosed and shod with a soft leather shoe of the fifteenth century couped also Purpure.
Motto
In Terra Divitiae (In The Earth Riches)
