= Cosby, Leicestershire =

Village in Leicestershire, England

Coordinates: 52°33.1′N 1°11.6′W

Cosby
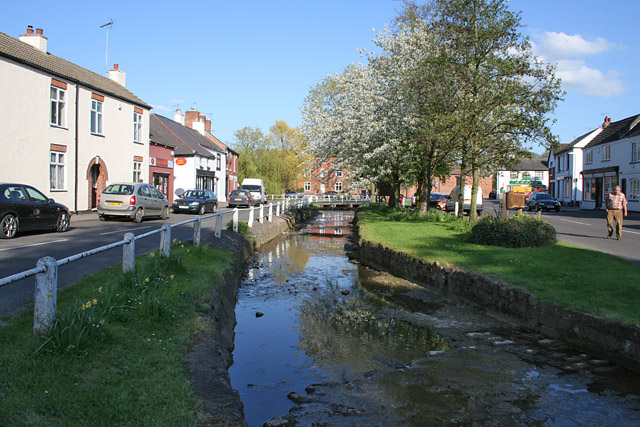

- Location within Leicestershire
- Population: 3,506
- District: Blaby
- Shire county: Leicestershire
- Region: East Midlands
- Country: England
- Sovereign state: United Kingdom
- Post town: LEICESTER
- Postcode district: LE9
- Dialling code: 0116
- Police: Leicestershire
- Fire: Leicestershire
- Ambulance: East Midlands
- UK Parliament: South Leicestershire

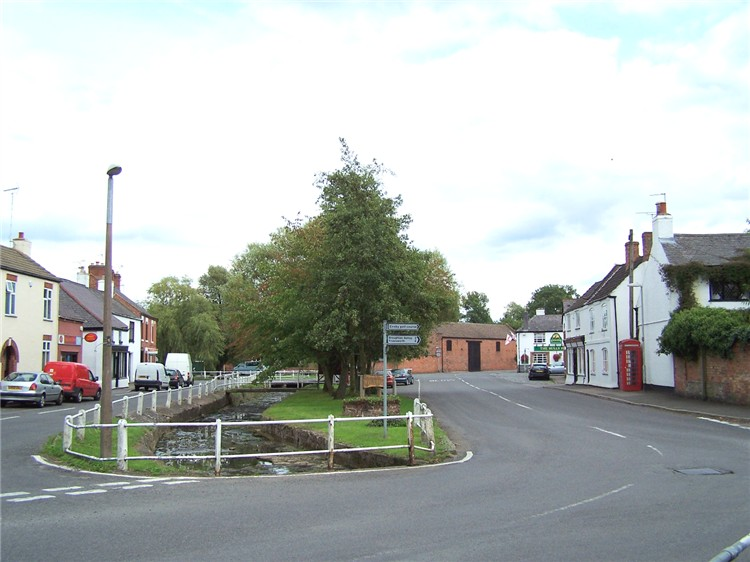
Cosby Village centre

Cosby is a village in the English county of Leicestershire. Cosby is located in the south of the county near the larger villages and towns of Whetstone, Blaby, Wigston and Oadby. Its proximity to the city of Leicester means it is part of the Leicester Urban Area. The village is administered by Blaby District Council. Cosby has a brook which runs through the village and eventually serves as a tributary to the River Soar, then runs into the river Humber and then into the North Sea. Even though The Wash is 59 miles away there is no source of the river in Cosby. London is 80 miles away, and the closest airports are East Midlands Airport (EMA) and Birmingham Airport (BHX)

The village's name probably means 'farm/settlement of Cossa'. 'Farm/settlement of Kofsi' has also been suggested.

== History ==
Cosby's 'Scandinavian' place name indicates that the village existed here several hundred years earlier, dating to the time of the Danish invasion in the earlier parts of the 9th century. However it is possible that there may have been an even earlier settlement here in Saxon or even Roman times given that the Fosse Way bounds the parish to the north.

Cosby is first recorded as "Cossebi" in the Domesday Book in 1086 with 40 families living in the village. Cosby was described as a "considerable village" in 1810 (with a population of 555) by historian John Nichols. In 1991 it had a population of 3,400 and in 2001 a population of 3,489, increasing to 3,506 at the 2011 census. 2022 census increased to 3,909 with demographics of 97% White British

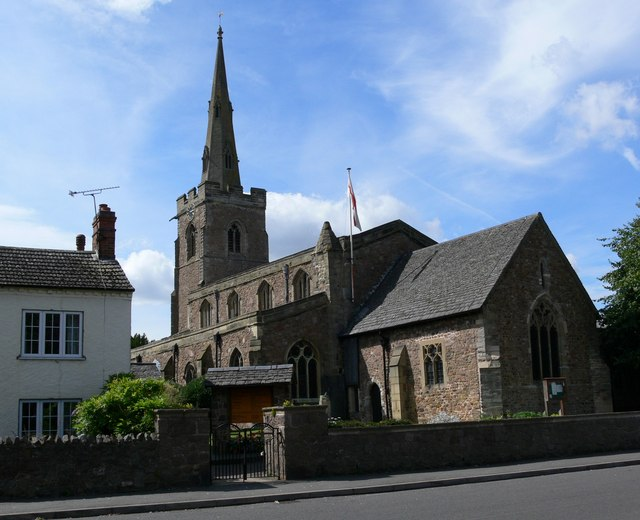
Church of St Michael and All Angels, Cosby

The parish church is the 14th century St Michael and All Angels'. It also has Methodist and Baptist churches. Cosby has two schools, Cosby Primary School and independent school Brooke House Day School. Cosby has football, rugby and cricket teams which all participate in Leicestershire's sporting leagues. The teams play their home games at Victory Park.

A 15th century granary, known as the Tithe Barn, sits next to the church and now forms a popular dining venue. It was taken over by H.W. Coates in the 1960s and known as the Coates Barn, before being restored in the 1980s into commercial office space. Original wattle and daub was saved along with other period elements and these are now on display for patrons.

Close to the church is the early 17th century house known as Brooks Edge. This is the historic home of the Armston family who lived in the village for more than 800 years. One member of this pro-Royalist family escaped after the Battle of Naseby and hid out in Whetstone Gorse. Cromwell's soldiers questioned many people as to his whereabouts, including his small son who refused to divulge his father's hiding place. According to the legend, this took place in the family home at Brooks Edge and was celebrated in William Frederick Yeames's famous painting And When Did You Last See Your Father?.

In 1767, the medieval open fields of the village were enclosed by Act of Parliament, bringing to an end the system of agriculture, which had been practiced in Cosby from before the Norman Conquest in 1066. The post enclosure revolution in farming resulted in Cosby becoming a more industrial village with framework knitting followed by boot and shoe manufacture dominating the 19th and early 20th centuries. During this period, the population of the village more than doubled from 555 in 1801 to 1,351 in 1901.

Council houses were built along Park Road and in Lady Leys during the 1920s and 1930s, while the Settlement was established in 1938 when 48 houses each with a third of an acre to house out of work families from Wales and the North East of England. By 1951 the population had risen to 1,533, five times that of the village in the 17th century. In the 1960s large private housing estates were also built making the village one of Leicestershire's increasing number of dormitory settlements.

The Great Central Railway, the last main line to be built from the north of England to London, opened on 15 Mar 1899 and ran past the east side of Cosby on an embankment. Although there was never a station at Cosby, this section of the line was well known for the lengthy curve which for northbound trains was to the right (east), after coming out of which the city of Leicester would be directly ahead and the route would be almost ruler straight all the rest of the way to the centre of the city, a distance of almost 5 miles (8 km). Railwaymen referred to this curve as Cosby Corner. The line closed on 5 May 1969; today the rear gardens of many adjacent homes have been extended up over the embankment.

Captain Robert_Kirby_Kirkman MC (25 June 1891 – 9 May 1938) was born in the village who was an English World War I flying ace credited with eight aerial victories.

The "Victory Show", a commemoration of World War II, is held at Foxlands Farm on a 100-acre site in September and is the largest event in the country. The show hosts re-enactments of military events.

== Sport ==
Cosby has a non-league football team Saffron Dynamo F.C., who play at King's Park, Cambridge Road, in the Midland League Division One.

In 2009, Sir Garfield Sobers came to the village at a special evening when he talked about his cricket career. The former West Indies captain returned a few days later to join members who had successfully bid to play a round of golf with him. His visits came during a busy spell for Cosby when they hosted the County Championship at the end of June of that year. Cosby Cricket Club celebrated their 200th anniversary in 2026.

In September 2011, Cosby's Lucy Garner sprinted to victory in Copenhagen to claim the Junior Women's World Championship. She finished in the Top 3 of the 2011 BBC Young Sports Personality of the Year Award category. In May 2012, Garner added the National Junior Road Race title to her Junior World Title.
