= Huncote =

Village in Leicestershire, England

Coordinates: 52.5720°N 1.2388°W

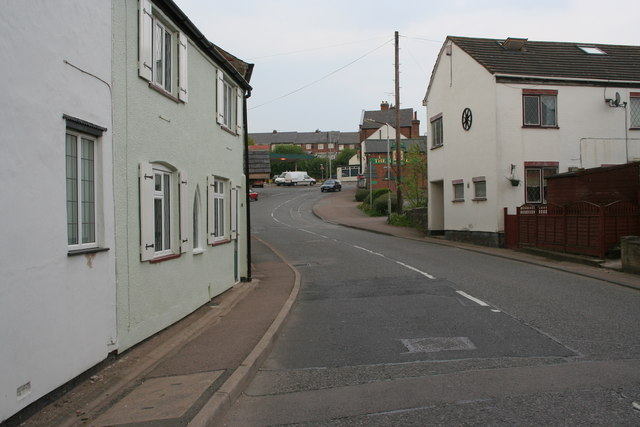
- View up Main Street

- Location within Leicestershire
- Area: 0.388 km^{2} (0.150 sq mi)
- Population: 1,756 (Census, 2011)
  - Density: 4,526/km^{2} (11,720/sq mi)
- OS grid reference: SP5197
  - London: 101 mi (163 km)
- Civil parish: Huncote Parish Council
- District: Blaby
- Shire county: Leicestershire
- Region: East Midlands
- Country: England
- Sovereign state: United Kingdom
- Post town: LEICESTER
- Postcode district: LE9
- Dialling code: 0116
- UK Parliament: South Leicestershire
- Website: Official website

Huncote is a village and civil parish in the district of Blaby in the county of Leicestershire, England. It is just west of Narborough, and is on the Thurlaston Brook.

The place-name Huncote is the etymological root of the American surnames Hunnicutt, and Honeycut.

== The Village ==
The village is small but still benefits from several amenities including a village pub (The Red Lion), a Spar shop (which contains the Post office), a Newsagent's shop, three hairdressers, a fish and chip shop, an Indian takeaway and five local parks spread throughout the village. At the edge of the village is Huncote Leisure Centre and further along the Forest Road, near to the M69 motorway, is the home of Leicester Animal Aid, a pet rescue centre. Huncote also has a woodyard, and a residential care home for the elderly.

In October 2015, the post office was moved into the Spar shop and now caters for both needs.

== Sport ==
Huncote provides sporting facilities with a running club (Huncote Harriers) and a Leisure Centre.

Huncote also have a football team, Huncote Sports F. C., who play in the Leicester & District Premier Division and who used to be members of the Leicestershire Senior League. In the 2014/15 season, Huncote won the '3 Sons Trophy' knockout competition, beating local rivals Magna 73 F. C. after a penalty shoot-out. Huncote's home ground is actually based on the outskirts of the neighbouring village of Thurlaston. The club have a Football Foundation standard clubhouse and shares the facilities with Huncote Cricket Club.

Huncote used to have a BMX club (Huncote Hornets) whose home track (opened 2015, closed November 2021, demolished August 2025) was based behind the Leisure Centre and was one of the top BMX tracks in the country.

== See also ==
- Richard Armitage, grew up in Huncote
