= All Saints Church, Narborough =

Coordinates: 52.5730°N 1.2034°W

All Saints' Church, Narborough
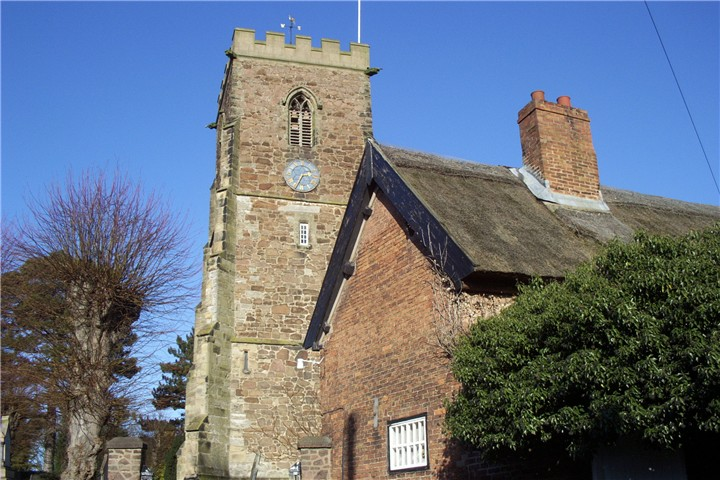
- All Saints' Church, Narborough
- Denomination: Church of England
- Churchmanship: High Church

History
- Dedication: All Saints

Administration
- Province: Canterbury
- Diocese: Leicester
- Parish: Narborough

All Saints' Church, Narborough is a parish church in the Church of England in Narborough, Leicestershire.

== History ==
The current church in Narborough dates from the 13th century, although it is highly probable an even earlier church dating back to the 10th century or before stood on or near the site. A Saxon hogback tombstone was found near the church and is on display at the Jewry Wall Museum in Leicester.

The church was largely rebuilt in 1856–1883. There are two aisles, nave, chancel and north vestry with a west tower containing a ring of six bells. The large nave of six bays has fine piers and strong shafts. The chancel was rebuilt in 1883 by F. Bacon. There is also an Ascension window by Theodora Salusbury from 1929 (Carlton church has another fine window by the artist) in the north aisle. The stained window has two fish hidden in the folds of the robes. The ornate reredos behind the altar is very fine as is the whole of the chancel area.

The church includes a number of memorials/windows to the Everard family.

The original Norman south porch was rebuilt in 1860 at a cost of £60. The font which has moved three times dates from the 13th century, and has tracery panels of various kinds including one with two parallel tree trunks. There are also sedilia in the southern aisle and a piscina. The graveyard is closed to burials now as these have transferred to the cemetery next door. In the actual churchyard there is a gravestone to a Harry Baker who died aged 49 in 1901 after being "thrown from a trap".

== Current status ==
The parish is part of the benefice of Narborough and Huncote, within the Diocese of Leicester. The church has weekly Sunday services and other events, including a yearly Christmas Tree Festival. The church is normally locked, but regular events and open days are held

All Saints' Church itself is a Grade II* listed building.
