= List of schools in Leicestershire =

This is a list of schools in Leicestershire, England.

== State-funded schools ==
=== Primary schools ===
- Ab Kettleby School, Ab Kettleby
- Albert Village Primary School, Albert Village
- All Saints CE Primary School, Coalville
- All Saints CE Primary School, Wigston
- Arnesby CE Primary School, Arnesby
- Asfordby Hill Primary School, Asfordby Hill
- Ashby Hastings Primary School, Ashby-de-la-Zouch
- Ashby Hill Top Primary School, Ashby-de-la-Zouch
- Ashby Willesley Primary School, Ashby-de-la-Zouch
- Ashby-de-la-Zouch CE Primary School, Ashby-de-la-Zouch
- Badgerbrook Primary School, Whetstone
- Barlestone CE Primary School, Barlestone
- Barrow Hall Orchard CE Primary School, Barrow upon Soar
- Barwell CE Academy, Barwell
- Barwell Infant School, Barwell
- Battling Brook Primary School, Hinckley
- Beacon Academy, Loughborough
- Belton CE Primary School, Belton
- Belvoirdale Community Primary School, Coalville
- Billesdon CE Primary School, Billesdon
- Bishop Ellis RC Primary Academy, Thurmaston
- Blaby Stokes CE Primary School, Blaby
- Blaby Thistly Meadow Primary School, Blaby
- Blackfordby St Margaret's CE Primary School, Blackfordby
- Booth Wood Primary School, Loughborough
- Bottesford CE Primary School, Bottesford
- Bringhurst Primary School, Bringhurst
- Brocks Hill Primary School, Oadby
- Brookside Primary School, Oadby
- Broom Leys School, Coalville
- Broomfield Community Primary School, East Goscote
- Brownlow Primary School, Melton Mowbray
- Buckminster Primary School, Buckminster
- Burbage CE Infant School, Burbage
- Burbage Junior School, Burbage
- Burton-on-the-Wolds Primary School, Burton on the Wolds
- Captains Close Primary School, Asfordby
- Christ Church & St Peter's CE Primary School, Mountsorrel
- Church Hill CE Junior School, Thurmaston
- Church Hill Infant School, Thurmaston
- Church Langton CE Primary School, Church Langton
- Claybrooke Primary School, Claybrooke Parva
- Cobden Primary School, Loughborough
- Congerstone Primary School, Congerstone
- Cosby Primary School, Cosby
- Cossington CE Primary School, Cossington
- Croft CE Primary School, Croft
- Croxton Kerrial CE Primary School, Croxton Kerrial
- Desford Community Primary School, Desford
- Diseworth CE Primary School, Diseworth
- Donisthorpe Primary School, Donisthorpe
- Dove Bank Primary School, Nailstone
- Dunton Bassett Primary School, Dunton Bassett
- Eastfield Primary School, Thurmaston
- Elizabeth Woodville Primary School, Groby
- Ellistown Community Primary School, Ellistown
- Enderby Danemill Primary School, Enderby
- Fairfield Community Primary School, South Wigston
- Farndon Fields Primary School, Market Harborough
- Fernvale Primary School, Thurnby
- Fleckney CE Primary School, Fleckney
- Fossebrook Primary School, Leicester Forest East
- Foxbridge Primary School, Castle Donington
- Foxton Primary School, Foxton
- Frisby CE Primary School, Frisby on the Wreake
- Gaddesby Primary School, Gaddesby
- Gilmorton Chandler CE Primary School, Gilmorton
- Glen Hills Primary School, Glen Parva
- Glenfield Primary School, Glenfield
- Glenmere Community Primary School, Wigston Magna
- Great Bowden CE Academy, Great Bowden
- Great Dalby School, Great Dalby
- Great Glen St Cuthbert's CE Primary School, Great Glen
- Greenfield Primary School, Countesthorpe
- Greystoke Primary School, Narborough
- Griffydam Primary School, Griffydam
- The Grove Primary School, Melton Mowbray
- The Hall Primary School, Glenfield
- Hallam Fields Primary School, Birstall
- Hallaton CE Primary School, Hallaton
- Hallbrook Primary School, Broughton Astley
- Harby CE Primary School, Harby
- Hathern CE Primary School, Hathern
- Heather Primary School, Heather
- Hemington Primary School, Hemington
- Higham-on-the-Hill CE Primary School, Higham on the Hill
- Highgate Primary School, Sileby
- Highcliffe Primary School, Birstall
- Hinckley Parks Primary School, Hinckley
- Hollycroft Primary School, Hinckley
- Holy Cross RC School, Whitwick
- Holywell Primary School, Loughborough
- Hose CE Primary School, Hose
- Houghton-on-the-Hill CE Primary School, Houghton on the Hill
- Hugglescote Community Primary School, Hugglescote
- Huncote Primary School, Huncote
- Husbands Bosworth CE Primary School, Husbands Bosworth
- Ibstock Junior School, Ibstock
- John Wycliffe Primary School, Lutterworth
- Kegworth Primary School, Kegworth
- Kibworth CE Primary School, Kibworth
- Kilby St Mary's CE Primary School, Kilby
- Kingsway Primary School, Braunstone Town
- Kirby Muxloe Primary School, Kirby Muxloe
- Lady Jane Grey Primary School, Groby
- Langmoor Primary School, Oadby
- The Latimer Primary School, Anstey
- Launde Primary School, Oadby
- Little Bowden School, Little Bowden
- Little Hill Primary School, Wigston
- Long Clawson CE Primary School, Long Clawson
- Long Whatton CE Primary School, Long Whatton
- Loughborough CE Primary School, Loughborough
- Lubenham All Saints CE Primary School, Lubenham
- Manorfield CE Primary School, Stoney Stanton
- Market Harborough CE Academy, Market Harborough
- Martinshaw Primary School, Groby
- The Meadow Community Primary School, Wigston Magna
- Meadowdale Primary School, Market Harborough
- Measham CE Primary School, Measham
- Mercenfeld Primary School, Markfield
- The Merton Primary School, Syston
- Millfield LEAD Academy, Braunstone Town
- Moira Primary School, Moira
- Mountfields Lodge School, Loughborough
- New Lubbesthorpe Primary School, Lubbesthorpe
- New Swannington Primary School, New Swannington
- Newbold CE Primary School, Newbold Coleorton
- Newbold Verdon Primary School, Newbold Verdon
- Newcroft Primary Academy, Shepshed
- Newlands Community Primary School, Earl Shilton
- Newton Burgoland Primary School, Newton Burgoland
- Newtown Linford Primary School, Newtown Linford
- Oakthorpe Primary School, Oakthorpe
- Old Dalby CE Primary School, Old Dalby
- Old Mill Primary School, Broughton Astley
- Orchard CE Primary School, Broughton Astley
- Orchard Community Primary School, Castle Donington
- Outwoods Edge Primary School, Loughborough
- Oxley Primary School, Shepshed
- Packington CE Primary School, Packington
- Parkland Primary School, South Wigston
- The Pastures Primary School, Narborough
- The Pochin School, Barkby
- Queniborough CE Primary School, Queniborough
- Ratby Primary School, Ratby
- Ravenhurst Primary School, Braunstone Town
- Red Hill Field Primary School, Narborough
- Redmile CE Primary School, Redmile
- Rendell School, Loughborough
- Richard Hill CE Primary School, Thurcaston
- Richmond Primary School, Hinckley
- Ridgeway Primary Academy, Market Harborough
- Riverside Community Primary School, Birstall
- Robert Bakewell Primary School, Loughborough
- Rothley CE Primary School, Rothley
- Sacred Heart RC Academy, Loughborough
- St Andrew's CE Primary School, North Kilworth
- St Bartholomew's CE Primary School, Quorn
- St Botolph's CE Primary School, Shepshed
- St Charles RC Primary Academy, Measham
- St Clare's RC Primary School, Coalville
- St Denys CE Infant School, Ibstock
- St Edward's CE Primary School, Castle Donington
- St Francis RC Primary School, Melton Mowbray
- St Hardulph's CE Primary School, Breedon on the Hill
- St John Fisher RC Academy, Wigston
- St Joseph's RC Academy, Market Harborough
- St Margaret's CE Primary School, Stoke Golding
- St Mary's CE Primary School, Bitteswell
- St Mary's CE Primary School, Hinckley
- St Mary's CE Primary School, Melton Mowbray
- St Mary's RC Primary School, Loughborough
- St Michael & All Angels CE Primary School, Rearsby
- St Peter and St Paul CE Academy, Syston
- St Peter's CE Primary Academy, Market Bosworth
- St Peter's CE Primary School, Whetstone
- St Peter's CE Primary School, Wymondham
- St Peter's RC Academy, Earl Shilton
- St Peter's RC Primary School, Hinckley
- St Simon and St Jude CE Primary School, Earl Shilton
- St Winefride's RC Academy, Shepshed
- Scalford CE Primary School
- Seagrave Village Primary School, Seagrave
- Sharnford CE Primary School, Sharnford
- Sheepy Magna CE Primary School, Sheepy Magna
- Sherard Primary School, Melton Mowbray
- Sherrier CE Primary School, Lutterworth
- Sileby Redlands Community Primary School, Sileby
- Sir John Moore CE Primary School, Appleby Magna
- Sketchley Hill Primary School, Burbage
- Snarestone CE Primary School, Snarestone
- Somerby Primary School, Somerby
- South Kilworth CE Primary School, South Kilworth
- Stafford Leys Community Primary School, Leicester Forest East
- Stanton under Bardon Community Primary School, Stanton under Bardon
- Stathern Primary School, Stathern
- Stonebow Primary School, Loughborough
- Swallowdale Primary School, Melton Mowbray
- Swannington CE Primary School, Swannington
- Swinford CE Primary School, Swinford
- Swithland St Leonard's CE Primary School, Swithland
- Thornton Primary School, Thornton
- Thorpe Acre Infant School, Loughborough
- Thorpe Acre Junior School, Loughborough
- Thringstone Primary School, Thringstone
- Thrussington CE Primary School, Thrussington
- Thurlaston CE Primary School, Thurlaston
- Thurnby St Luke's CE Primary School, Thurnby
- Thythorn Field Community Primary School, Wigston
- Townlands CE Primary School, Earl Shilton
- Tugby CE Primary School, Tugby
- Ullesthorpe CE Primary School, Ullesthorpe
- Viscount Beaumont's CE Primary School, Coleorton
- Waltham on the Wolds CE Primary School, Waltham on the Wolds
- Warren Hills Community Primary School, Coalville
- Water Leys Primary School, Wigston
- Westfield Infant School, Hinckley
- Westfield Junior School, Hinckley
- Whitwick St John The Baptist CE Primary School, Whitwick
- Witherley CE Primary School, Witherley
- Woodcote Primary School, Ashby-de-la-Zouch
- Woodhouse Eaves St Paul's CE Primary School, Woodhouse Eaves
- Woodland Grange Primary School, Oadby
- Woodstone Community Primary School, Ravenstone
- Woolden Hill Primary School, Anstey
- Worthington School, Worthington
- Wymeswold CE Primary School, Wymeswold

=== Secondary schools ===
- Ashby School, Ashby-de-la-Zouch
- Beauchamp College, Oadby
- Bosworth Academy, Desford
- Brockington College, Enderby
- Brookvale Groby Learning Campus, Groby
- Castle Donington College, Castle Donington
- The Castle Rock School, Coalville
- The Cedars Academy, Birstall
- Charnwood College, Loughborough
- Countesthorpe Academy, Countesthorpe
- De Lisle College, Loughborough
- Gartree High School, Oadby
- Hastings High School, Burbage
- Heath Lane Academy, Earl Shilton
- Hinckley Academy, Hinckley
- Humphrey Perkins School, Barrow upon Soar
- Ibstock Community College, Ibstock
- Ivanhoe School, Ashby-de-la-Zouch
- Iveshead School, Shepshed
- John Ferneley College, Melton Mowbray
- Kibworth Mead Academy, Kibworth
- Limehurst Academy, Loughborough
- Long Field Academy, Melton Mowbray
- Lutterworth College, Lutterworth
- Lutterworth High School, Lutterworth
- Manor High School, Oadby
- The Market Bosworth School, Market Bosworth
- The Martin High School, Anstey
- The Newbridge School, Coalville
- The Priory Belvoir Academy, Bottesford
- Rawlins Academy, Quorn
- Redmoor Academy, Hinckley
- Robert Smyth Academy, Market Harborough
- The Roundhill Academy, Thurmaston
- St Martin's Catholic Academy, Stoke Golding
- South Charnwood High School, Markfield
- South Wigston High School, South Wigston
- Stephenson Studio School, Coalville
- Thomas Estley Community College, Broughton Astley
- Welland Park Academy, Market Harborough
- Wigston Academy, Wigston
- The Winstanley School, Braunstone Town
- Woodbrook Vale School, Loughborough
- Wreake Valley Academy, Syston

=== Special and alternative schools ===
- Ashmount School, Loughborough
- Birch Wood School, Melton Mowbray
- Compass Community School, Barwell
- Dorothy Goodman School, Hinckley
- Forest Way School, Coalville
- Foxfields Academy, Blaby
- The Fusion Academy, Barwell
- Maplewell Hall School, Woodhouse Eaves
- Oakfield School, Shepshed
- Wigston Birkett House Community Special School, Wigston Magna

=== Further education ===
- Brooksby Melton College
- Loughborough College
- South Leicestershire College
- Stephenson College
- Wigston College

== Independent schools ==
=== Primary and preparatory schools ===
- Fairfield Preparatory School, Loughborough
- Twycross House Pre-Preparatory School, Twycross

=== Senior and all-through schools ===
- Brooke House College, Market Harborough
- Brooke House Day School, Cosby
- Dixie Grammar School, Market Bosworth
- Leicester Grammar School, Great Glen
- Loughborough Grammar School, Loughborough
- Loughborough High School, Loughborough
- Ratcliffe College, Ratcliffe on the Wreake
- Stoneygate School, Great Glen
- Twycross House School, Twycross

=== Special and alternative schools ===
- ALP Leicester, Birstall
- ASPIRE: Lifeskills, Loughborough
- The Cedars School, Hinckley
- Clovelly House School, Thornton
- Compass Community School Mountfields House, Loughborough
- Dovetree School, Hinckley
- The Grange Therapeutic School, Knossington
- Hardwick House School, Loughborough
- The Lady Byron School, Fleckney
- Lewis Charlton Learning Centre, Ashby-de-la-Zouch
- Lodge Farm Education, Broughton Astley
- Meadow View Farm School, Barwell
- Nanpantan Hall Nurture Centre, Loughborough
- Oakwood School, Barlestone
- The Place Independent School, Bottesford
- Quorn Hall School, Quorn
- REAL Independent Schools, Hinckley
- RNIB College, Loughborough
- Sketchley School, Burbage
- Wolfdale School, Anstey
- Woodfield School, Frolesworth
- Woodside Lodge Outdoor Learning Centre, Quorn
