= Coleorton Wood =

Woodland in Leicestershire, England

Coordinates: 52°44′39.93″N 1°24′36.48″W

Coleorton Wood is a woodland in the village of Coleorton, near Coalville in northwest Leicestershire, England. It is a six-hectare (15-acre) mixed woodland that was planted during the early days of the National Forest. The site was formerly Coleorton Pit, or colliery, which opened in 1875, and closed in the 1930s. It gained the local nickname of 'Bug and Wink' colliery.

Coleorton Wood is on the route of the Mining Heritage Trail, which is a nine-mile (14 km) walk tracing the coal mining history of this part of Leicestershire.
