= Edwin Walker (cricketer) =

English cricketer

Personal information
- Full name: Edwin William Walker
- Born: 27 December 1909; Coalville, Leicestershire, England
- Died: 16 March 1994 (aged 84); Gravesend, Kent, England
- Batting: Right-handed
- Bowling: Right-arm fast-medium

Domestic team information
- Years: Team
- 1930: Leicestershire

Career statistics
Competition	First-class
Matches	1
Runs scored	1
Batting average	2.00
100s/50s	–/–
Top score	1*
Balls bowled	102
Wickets	1
Bowling average	21.00
5 wickets in innings	–
10 wickets in match	–
Best bowling	1/21
Catches/stumpings	–/–
- Source: Cricinfo, 30 January 2013

Edwin William Walker (27 December 1909 – 16 March 1994) was an English cricketer. Walker was a right-handed batsman who bowled right-arm fast-medium. He was born at Coalville, Leicestershire.

Walker made a single first-class appearance for Leicestershire against Worcestershire in the 1930 County Championship at New Road, Worcester. Worcestershire batted first and made 222 all out, with Walker taking the wicket of Leslie Wright to finish the innings with figures of 1/21 from seventeen overs. Leicestershire were dismissed for just 58 in their response, with Walker dismissed for a single run by Reg Perks. Forced to follow-on in their second-innings, Leicestershire were dismissed for 152, with Walker ending the innings not out on 1. Leicestershire lost the match by an innings and 12 runs, while Walker never played for the county again.

He died at Gravesend, Kent on 16 March 1994.
