= Stephenson College =

Stephenson College may refer to:

- Stephenson College, Coalville
- Stephenson College, Durham
