= Longfield Academy =

Longfield Academy may refer to:

- Longfield Academy, Darlington, a secondary school in Darlington, County Durham, England
- Longfield Academy, Kent, a secondary school in Longfield, Kent, England

== See also ==
- Long Field Academy
