= Wreake Valley Academy =

Location
- Parkstone Road; Leicester, Leicestershire, LE7 1LY; England; 52°42′16″N 1°04′07″W

Information
- Other names: Wreake, Wreake Valley
- Former name: Wreake Valley Community College (31 August 1971 - 31 March 2012)
- Type: Academy
- Established: August 31, 1971
- Department for Education URN: 137983 Tables
- Ofsted: Reports
- Head teacher: Ben Rackley
- Gender: Co-educational
- Age range: 11-18
- Enrolment: 1126 (as of June 2026)
- Website: www.wreake.bepschools.org

Wreake Valley Academy (formerly Wreake Valley Community College) is a co-educational secondary school with academy status in Syston, Leicestershire, England. The school is known locally just as 'Wreake' or 'Wreake Valley', which is the name of the geographical area.

== History ==
Leicestershire was the first county to go completely comprehensive by 1970, largely due to Stewart Mason, the county director of education.

It opened as Wreake Valley Upper School and Community College on Tuesday 31 August 1971. It was built on the former university farm of the University of Leicester. It was planned to take 1,440 children.

Two months later, two school teachers married, languages teacher Patricia Longhurst and art teacher David Pierce.

The catchment area was East Goscote, Gaddesby, East Queniborough, Rearsby, Syston and Thrussington. It was built with the Soar Valley College and another at Countesthorpe.

It was officially opened by the Prime Minister, at 3pm on Wednesday 27 September 1972, with the Leicestershire Director of Education Mr A.N. Fairburn, and the chairman of the Leicestershire Education Committee, Peter Hill.

== The college ==
Wreake Valley Academy is an 11-18 co-educational school in Syston, Leicestershire, England. Despite its ship-like appearance, the building was actually inspired by Ziggurats and is now a listed building. In April 2020 Tim Marston took over as Headteacher.

=== Headteachers ===
- 1971, Miss Emmeline Garnett (1924 - 21 July 2022), Miss Garnett was born in Lancaster, wrote children's educational books, had taught overseas from 1954 to 1957, was a radio broadcaster in the late 1950s, and was a former television producer for religious programmes for ATV (Associated Television), notably 'About Religion' in the early 1960s and 'A Box of Birds' in 1962, and wrote the BBC Radio 3 educational series A-Level English in 1967 and presented Reading to Learn on BBC Radio 3 in January 1970
- January 1981, Neill Ransom, former headmaster of The Newbridge School, left teaching to go into industry in April 1988, becoming managing director of European Study Conferences of Northamptonshire
- October 1988, Miss Rosemary Longland, former headteacher of John Ferneley College since September 1983

== The sixth form ==
Students in England have the option to leave school aged 16, once completing their GCSEs. It is optional for students to 'stay-on' in further education. The college's sixth form has grown in recent years, in 2005 there were only 71 students taking their A2 exams. In September 2004 the college, in an attempt to increase Post 16 numbers such as GNVQs. Many students progress to higher education and each year a number of students gain admission to prestigious Universities e.g. Oxbridge, Imperial College London and Warwick and courses such as medicine, veterinary medicine, economics and law.

The sixth form has its own area within the college, where only adults, students, sixth formers and staff are permitted to visit. Within this area are a number of classrooms varying in size and a quiet study area. There is also a common room for sixth form students.

Students in the sixth form may take part in a number of extra-curricula activities, including Young Enterprise, Community Sports Leadership Award, many sports clubs e.g. football, rugby union and basketball.

Wreake Valley Community College has its own Proscenium stage on which Wreake Valley's students have performed in a variety of shows including Les Misérables (2008), RENT (2010) and We Will Rock You (2011).

In 2019 the Sixth Form officially became known as Bradgate Sixth Form.

== Extracurricular activities ==
The Air Training Corps (ATC) was a military-based youth organisation for 13- to 20-year-olds and the local squadron (No 1181 Syston Squadron) was based in the grounds of the academy. It was closed because no volunteer officer could be found to take charge of the squadron

== Notable former pupils ==
- Darren Maddy, Leicestershire cricketer
- Luke Thomas (footballer, born 2001), Professional footballer
