= Bardon Park Chapel =

Church in Bardon, Leicestershire, England

Coordinates: 52°42′10.2″N 1°19′22.2″W

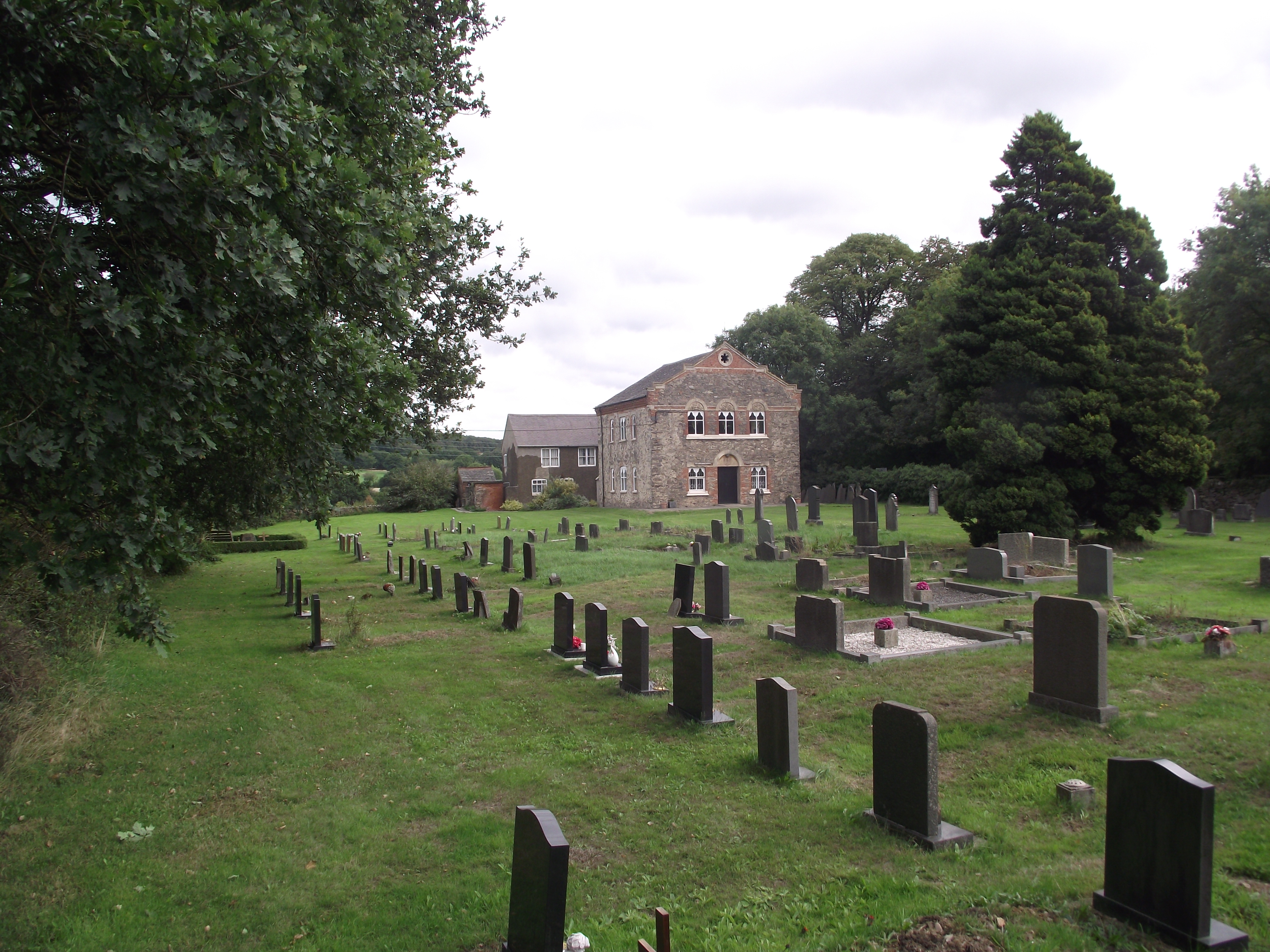
Bardon Park Chapel

Bardon Park Chapel is a 300-year-old Christian meeting house at Bardon, Leicestershire, England. It stands back from the A511 road (Shaw Lane), between Coalville and Markfield, about 1.3 miles (2.1 km) west of M1 junction 22. At the time of its construction, the meeting house was set within a medieval deer park.

The chapel is a Grade II Listed building. It may be the oldest non-conformist place of worship in Leicestershire and indeed across a wide area of the East Midlands.

For details of how to find the chapel, see Section 6 (Location) below.

== Origins ==
Meetings for worship were first held in the old Bardon Hall, a moated house in Bardon Park, at a time in the 17th century when it was unlawful to meet for worship other than according to the rites and canons of the Church of England.

Shortly after the Glorious Revolution of 1688 when William and Mary took the throne of England, and Parliament passed the Act of Toleration in 1689, the squire of Bardon Hall, John Hood built the meeting house at the gate of his estate, and engaged the services of a Presbyterian minister the Reverend Michael Matthews.

It is said that meetings for worship were held in the Bardon Hall from 1662 (the year of the "Great Ejection") onwards. However, evidence for this is scant.

Michael Matthews also ministered at Mountsorrel (or Mount Soar Hill) and his grave is in the nave of the parish church at Swithland. His son-in-law James Watson also ministered at Mountsorrel and Bardon, and eventually James took the pastorate at the prestigious Great Meeting in Leicester.

In the first part of the 18th century, a Dr John Evans compiled a list of Dissenting congregations throughout the country. Dr. Evans's list indicates that Bardon Park was the largest rural congregation in Leicestershire.

== Schools ==
A Sunday school operated at Bardon Park from 1820 onwards. There was also a day-school, prior to the Elementary Education Act 1870. This day-school formed part of the "British Schools" movement (i.e. schools run under the auspices of the British and Foreign School Society).

== The chapel buildings ==
The chapel is square, with a high pulpit on the north wall and two large round-topped windows behind the pulpit, in typical style of the times. The pulpit probably dated from the mid-18th century, though it has been badly altered. Behind the pulpit are two slate memorials, one dating from the end of the late 18th century and the other from the early 19th century. The chapel is galleried on three sides. The present galleries date from 1905 but they replace earlier galleries.

In 1877, the exterior appearance of the chapel was much altered as part of a re-modelling, and the "1877" datestone above the doorway indicates the date of re-modelling, the actual structure of the building being much older, and said to be 300 years old. The present gabled roof dates from 1877 and replaces earlier hipped roofs.

A notable feature of the chapel is that a casement window opens to allow coffins to be admitted.

To the rear of the chapel is a 19th-century schoolroom. This retains a painted alphabet board dated 1848, high on the classroom wall, as a model for scholars to copy their letters.

The buildings stand well back from the road, and they are surrounded by a sizeable burial ground.

The chapel is situated at the edge of Bardon Park (formerly an ancient deer park), with views across the parkland and to the Bardon Hall and the Bardon Hill summit beyond.

== The life of the chapel ==
In the 18th century, "Bardon Meeting" was attended by local gentry and squirearchy. In the 19th century, the chapel took on a new life as a place of worship for local farm, colliery and quarry workers. Today the chapel has a small congregation.

== History of denominational allegiance ==
The early ministers at Bardon Park were Presbyterian. The wider or more general term "Protestant Dissenters" was also used and, in 1765, when the then head of the Hood family vested the Bardon Park Chapel in trustees, his Trust Deed did not identify any particular denomination. The 1765 Deed says simply that the building is to be used for "Protestant Dissenters" to worship in.

A national Congregational Union was formed in the 1830s. In 1972 the Presbyterian Church of England and the Congregational Union merged as the United Reformed Church. The Bardon Park congregation had affiliated to the Congregational Union during the first half of the 19th century and in 1972 joined the United Reformed Church.

In 2010 Bardon Park Chapel was used by both the United Reformed Church congregation and Bardon Park Chapel Christian Fellowship.

During its long history as a Christian meetinghouse in the Free Church tradition, the Bardon Park Chapel has been a place of worship used by Presbyterians, by Congregationalists and by Christians of no particular denomination.

== Location ==
Latitude and longitude coordinates are N 52 degrees 42 minutes 10.2 seconds W 001 degree 19 minutes 22.2 seconds. (These coordinates may also be expressed as N 52 degrees 42.170 minutes W 001 degree 19.370 minutes or as N 52.7028 degrees W 001.3228). Ordnance Survey National Grid Reference is SK 45911 11955 (expressed as an all-numeric reference: 445911, 311955).

The chapel fronts the eastbound (Leicester-bound) carriageway of the A 511 dual-carriageway main road (Shaw Lane), 1.4 miles west of M1 Junction 22.

The 'what3words' address of the entrance to the chapel's driveway is silver.yacht.admits

The chapel's postal address is Shaw Lane, Bardon Hill, Coalville, LE67 1SY.

The chapel stands approximately 635 feet (193 metres) above mean sea level.
