= MC Pitman =

British rapper and hip-hop producer

MC Pitman is a rapper and hip-hop producer from Coalville, Leicestershire, UK.

MC Pitman is the alter-ego of Styly Cee, a former Pirate Radio DJ based in Nottingham. Prior to creating Pitman, he was member of Lost Island, with another rapper called Frisco.

Pitman's music is a combination of American-style hip hop production, combined with humorous and satirical lyrics. He speaks with a prominent East Midlands English accent. Amongst his targets are UK group The Streets, pop rap and Tony Blair. He styles himself as a coal miner, and appears on stage and in videos dressed in a British Coal NCB Donkey Jacket, a hard hat with a lamp and a flask of tea. His face is often covered in coal dust.

== Discography ==
=== Albums ===
- It Takes a Nation of Tossers, Son Records, 2003
- Pit Closure, Son Records, 2004
- The Dirty Helmet Sessions, Son Records, 2008

=== Singles ===
- "Phone Pitman 2" (7-inch), Son Records, 2002
- "Witness the Pitness" (7-inch), Son Records, 2002
- "It Takes Tea" (7-inch), Son Records, 2003
- "Music Maker" (7-inch), Son Records, 2007
