= TEREX Pegson =

Terex Pegson Limited
- Formerly: Samuel Pegg and Son
- Founded: 1830; 195 years ago
- Headquarters: Coalville, Leicestershire, England, United Kingdom
- Parent: Powerscreen (1996-1999); Terex Corporation (from 1999)
- Website: terexpegson.com

Terex Pegson Limited is a UK manufacturer of mobile crushing machines, and is part of the Terex Corporation. Pegson is headquartered in the town of Coalville in Leicestershire, England, with a distribution center for North America in Louisville, Kentucky.

Terex Pegson's crushing machines are predominantly used in aggregates extraction and material processing. Pegson also produces machines and equipment for the recycling, demolition and reclamation industries. The company has produced specialized crushing equipment to allow effective reclamation of building materials for over 40 years; in 1959, Terex Pegson equipment was crushing and processing recyclable materials for use in the construction of the Mauvoisin Dam high in the Swiss Alps.

Terex Pegson was founded in 1830 as Samuel Pegg and Son. It was merged with Brown Lennox in 1996 after being purchased by the Irish screening company, Powerscreen. Powerscreen was acquired by the Terex Corporation in 1999.

Terex Pegson was awarded a Queen's Award for Enterprise in 2005, repeating its success of 2002. A remarkable 80% growth in exports over the last three years is the main reason for the 2005 award. Production will be moved to Northern Ireland during 2009 with the loss of over 200 jobs. Production restarted in the Coalville site manufacturing the larger machines in 2012 to increase the overall manufacturing of the Group. Terex Pegson machines are now branded Powerscreen and are support by the Terex Materials Processing Aftermarket department.
