= Coalville Greyhound Stadium =

Greyhound racing stadium in England

- Location: Belvoir Road, Coalville, North West Leicestershire
- Coordinates: 52°43′06″N 1°22′26″W
- Opened: 1927
- Closed: 1990

Coalville Greyhound Stadium was a greyhound racing stadium on Belvoir Road, Coalville, North West Leicestershire.

== Origins ==
The stadium was constructed on a spare plot of land between Highfield Street on its west side and Belvoir Road on its west side.

== Opening ==
Coalville's opening night was 15 October 1927 and the racing was independent (not affiliated to the sports governing body the National Greyhound Racing Club).

== History ==
During the 1950s and 1960s racing was held on Tuesday evenings with trial sessions on a Sunday. The track had an 'Inside Sumner' hare system and race distances of 300, 515 and 700 yards.

By the 1980s racing was held on Tuesday and Saturday and facilities included a glass fronted stand with car parking for 300 vehicles. The Halfway House pub on Belvoir Road backed on to the track acting as licensed facility for the stadium. The track was 440 yards in circumference and the annual events included the Summer Midland Sprint and Midland Leger. Race Distances were 300, 510 and 715 yards and Afghan racing also took place on occasional Sundays.

== Closure ==
The track closed in 1990 after planning was given for a new housing development.
