= 159 Coalville–Hinckley =

Bus route in England

159
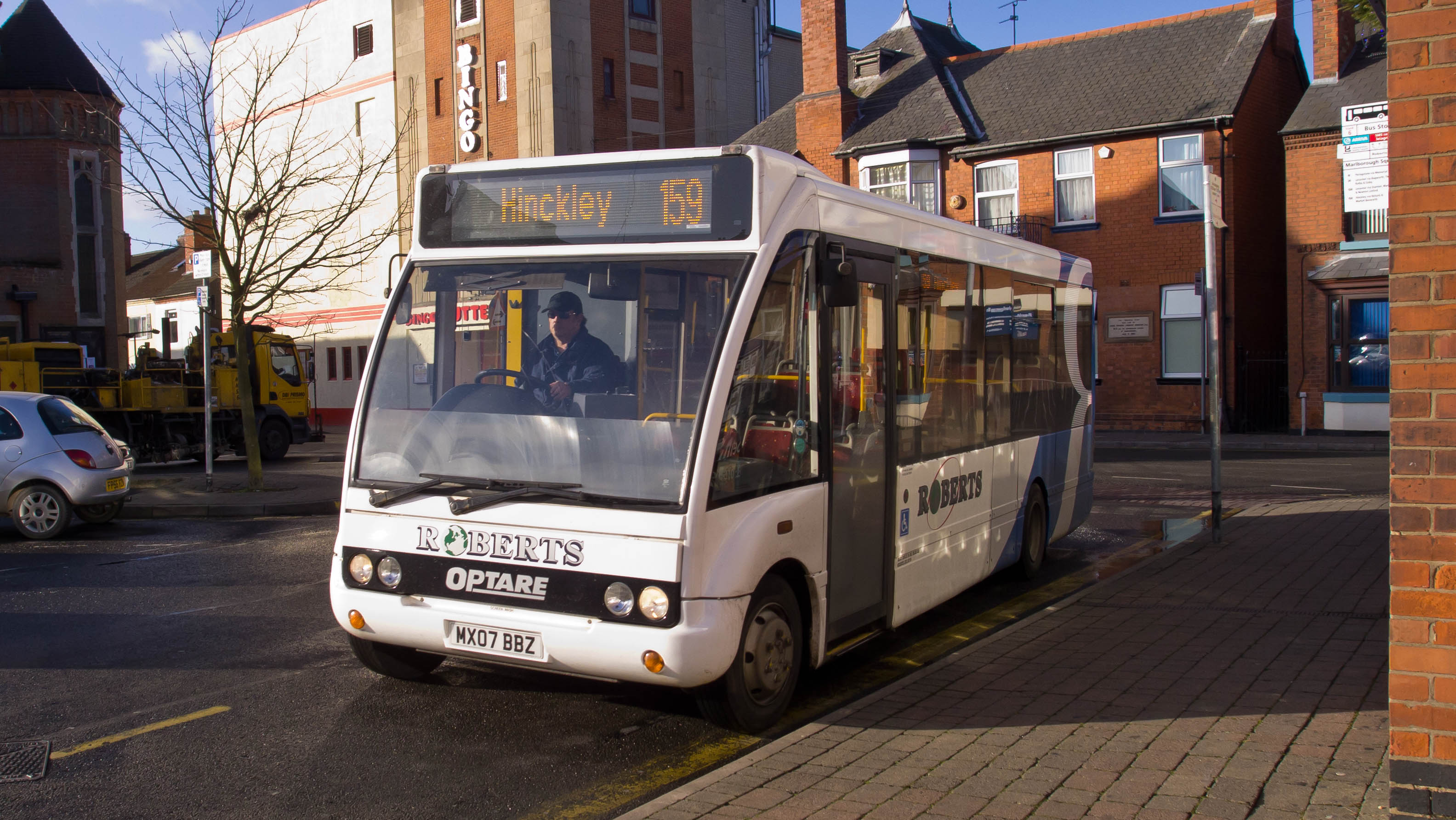

Overview
- Operator: Roberts Coaches
- Status: ceased operation
- Ended service: 2023

Route
- Start: Coalville
- End: Hinckley

159 was a bus route in England that operates between Coalville and Hinckley, it was operated by Roberts Coaches.

The route operated approximately every 1.5 hours from Monday to Saturday.

In November 2018, Roberts Coaches stated that the route was no longer commercially viable and that it would be withdrawn. However, in December the local council agreed to continue funding the route.

In December 2022, it was announced that the route would be withdrawn after 25 February 2023. The local council stated that at a cost of £162,000 per year it could not afford to continue subsidising the route. It stated that demand-responsive transport would be implemented for those who would no longer have a local bus route.

During 2025, Leicestershire County Council announced a new service LC6 would be introduced between Hinckley and Coalville which follows most of the former 159 service and provides 4 journeys each way Monday to Saturday daytimes.
