= William Stenson =

British mining engineer

William Stenson, 1771 - 1861

William Stenson (1770–1861) was a mining engineer born in Coleorton, Leicestershire.

== Background ==
Little is currently known about Stenson's background. Detail of his parentage remains unknown and neither is it known where he would have received his training as an engineer. It is known that he was a non-conformist, being buried in the old Baptist cemetery at Hugglescote and also that he is said to have been born at Coleorton, Leicestershire. The connection of his family with Coleorton is supported by a baptismal entry for one William Stenson of Coleorton Moor which occurs in the register of Packington Baptist Church for 1770, though this would relate to an adult baptism and therefore not that of Stenson the engineer.

It has also been suggested that 'Stenson' would have been a variant spelling of 'Stinson', the Stinsons being a very prominent family of tradesmen in this district. During the 19th and early 20th centuries for example, several of this family were proprietors of businesses in the neighbouring village of Whitwick, which included a tallow candle factory, mineral water factory and butcher's shop.

== Founding of Whitwick Colliery and birth of the town of Coalville ==
In the 1820s, he started to sink a mine shaft on a farm alongside a track known as Long Lane in the parish of Whitwick. His boring, in what was then a remote wilderness, proved the presence of coal and led to the growth of an industrial settlement around the site of the colliery which is now known as the modern town of Coalville.

Soon after founding the Whitwick Colliery, when visiting the north-east of England, Stenson saw the new Stockton and Darlington Railway and at once realised the great potential of this revolutionary method of transport. He surveyed land between his colliery and Leicester to choose a suitable route and then, with the backing of his partners, formed the Leicester and Swannington Railway Company. He contacted George Stephenson, who invested £2500 in the enterprise and Stephenson's son, Robert, was appointed the railway's engineer.

Stenson - often referred to as 'the father of Coalville' - lived to the grand old age of ninety and witnessed the birth of the new town. His house (now demolished) was near the site of the present day North West Leicestershire Municipal Offices, and this has been commemorated by the placement of a memorial stone, "erected in loving memory by his family, July 1999". More recently, his memory has been perpetuated by the naming of a road on the Whitwick Business Park - "Stenson Road", and also by the renaming of the town's municipal offices, to "Stenson House".

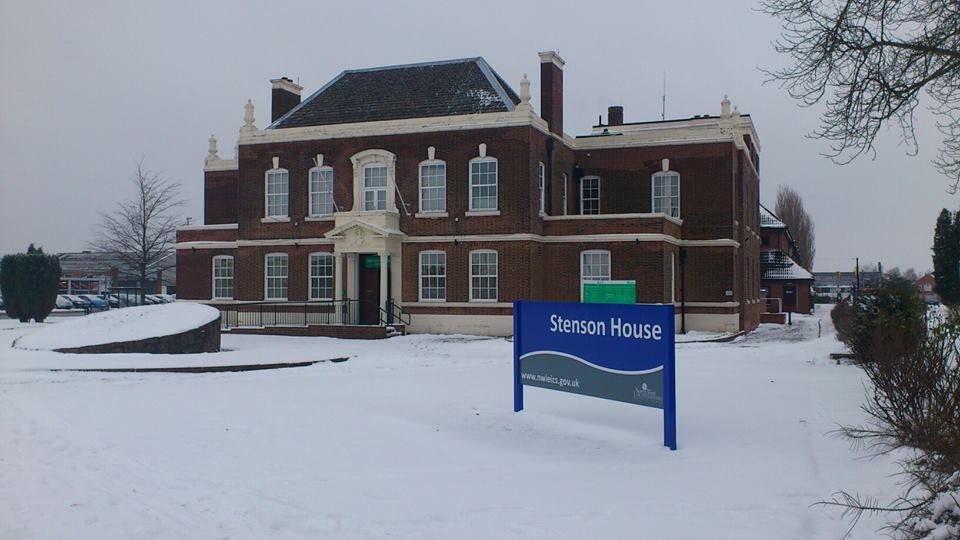
Stenson House, January 2013

He was buried in the old Baptist cemetery off Grange Road, Hugglescote, where his tomb has recently been restored.
