= Leslie Wright (cricketer) =

English cricketer

Personal information
- Born: 20 January 1903; Durham, England
- Died: 6 January 1956 (aged 52); Mitcham, Surrey, England
- Batting: Right-handed
- Bowling: Right arm medium

Domestic team information
- Years: Team
- 1925–1933: Worcestershire

Career statistics
| Competition | FC |
|---|---|
| Matches | 193 |
| Runs scored | 6,593 |
| Batting average | 19.97 |
| 100s/50s | 5/28 |
| Top score | 134 |
| Balls bowled | 7,739 |
| Wickets | 76 |
| Bowling average | 48.01 |
| 5 wickets in innings | 0 |
| 10 wickets in match | 0 |
| Best bowling | 3–6 |
| Catches/stumpings | 60/0 |
- Source: , 2 August 2008

Leslie Wright (20 January 1903 – 6 January 1956) was an English first-class cricketer who played 193 matches between 1925 and 1933, every one of them for Worcestershire. He was primarily an opening batsman and an occasional medium-paced bowler.

Wright played as a professional for Stourbridge Cricket Club before beginning his county career. His first-class debut came in May 1925, when he scored 31 and 14 against Oxford University at The Parks. He did not play again that season, but in 1926 he appeared on 26 occasions, and ended the summer with 873 first-class runs at an average of 18.97. This tally included his maiden hundred, 111 against Hampshire (sharing an opening partnership of 185 with Maurice Jewell) in midsummer. He also picked up the first of his 76 wickets when he removed Leicestershire's Les Berry and Alec Skelding in early June.

From then until the end of his career in 1933, Wright was a regular sight in the Worcestershire team: in only two seasons (1931 and 1933) did he make fewer than 20 appearances. His most productive season was 1928, when he made 1,402 runs at 24.07, including 101 and 57 against Hampshire. He also passed his thousand runs in 1930, when he hit 1,180: this was the only year in which he made two centuries, of which the higher (his career best) was 134 against Northamptonshire in July. He narrowly missed out on the landmark in 1929, making 992 runs that year.

After 1930 Wright never scored another hundred, and although his form recovered somewhat after a dreadful 1931 in which he averaged less than 10, in 92 innings in the last three years of his career the highest score was the 86 he struck against the touring Indians at Worcester in June 1932. He did hit another six half-centuries that summer, and a further three in his final season of 1933. His last game, against Glamorgan in late August 1933, was an anticlimax: Wright was bowled by George Lavis for 3 in his only innings, and went wicketless from ten overs.

Wright also played football as a centre-forward in the Worcester League. After retiring from cricket, he ran a remand home in Mitcham, Surrey.
