= Coalville =

Town in Leicestershire, England

Coordinates: 52.724°N 1.369°W

- Town
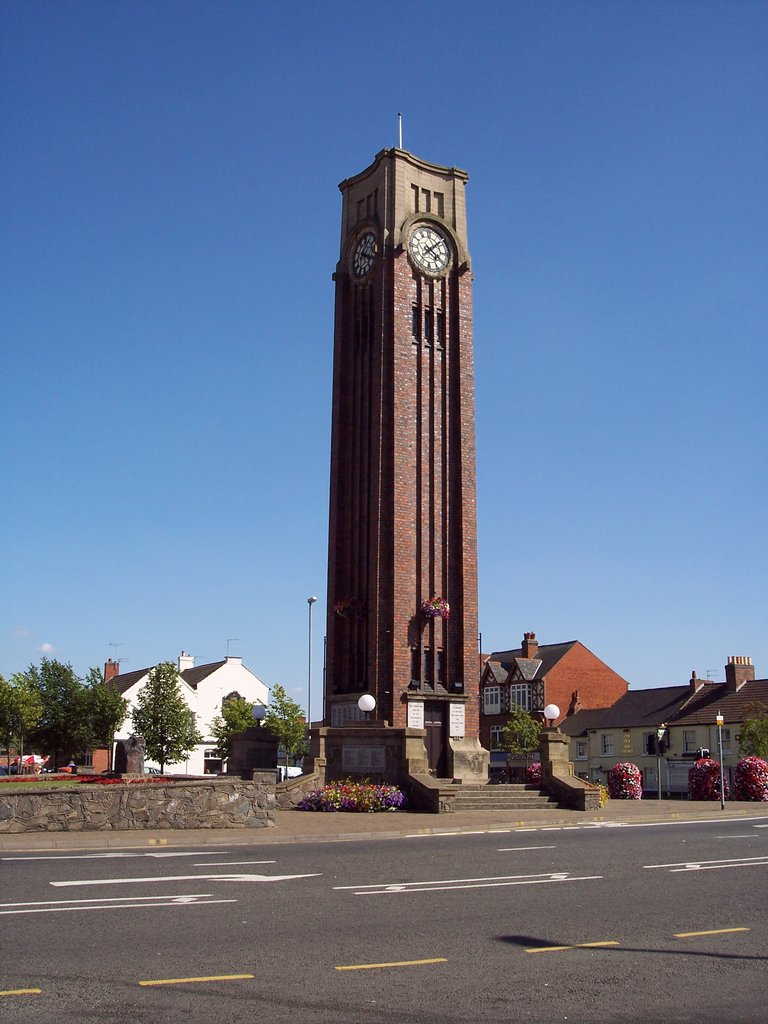
- Memorial Square and Clock Tower

- Location within Leicestershire
- Population: 37,661
- Demonym: Coalvillian
- OS grid reference: SK4213
- District: North West Leicestershire
- Shire county: Leicestershire
- Region: East Midlands
- Country: England
- Sovereign state: United Kingdom
- Areas of the town (2011 census BUASD): List: Bardon-on-the-Hill; Donington le Heath; Ellistown; Hugglescote; New Swannington; Ravenstone; Snibston; Swannington; Thringstone; Whitwick
- Post town: Coalville
- Postcode district: LE67
- Dialling code: 01530
- Police: Leicestershire
- Fire: Leicestershire
- Ambulance: East Midlands
- UK Parliament: North West Leicestershire

Coalville is a town in the North West Leicestershire district in the county of Leicestershire, England. The town is situated on the A511 between Leicester and Burton upon Trent.

In 2011, it had a population of 34,575.

Coalville is twinned with Romans-sur-Isère in southeastern France.

== History ==
Coalville is a product of the Industrial Revolution. As its name indicates, it is a former coal mining town and was a centre of the coal-mining district of north Leicestershire. It has been suggested that the name may derive from the name of the house belonging to the founder of Whitwick Colliery: 'Coalville House'. However, conclusive evidence is a report in the Leicester Chronicle of 16 November 1833: 'Owing to the traffic which has been produced by the Railway and New Collieries on Whitwick Waste, land which 20 years ago would not have fetched £20 per acre (£50 per hectare), is now selling in lots at from £400 to £500 per acre (£1,000 to £1,200 per hectare), for building upon. The high chimneys, and numerous erections upon the spot, give the neighbourhood quite an improved appearance. We hear it is intended to call this new colony "COALVILLE" - an appropriate name.'

=== Pre-industrial period ===
In the early nineteenth century, the area now known as Coalville was little more than a track known as Long Lane, which ran approximately east–west, stretching between two turnpikes, Bardon and Hoo Ash. Long Lane divided the parishes of Swannington and Whitwick (both lying to the north of Long Lane) from the parishes of Snibston and Ibstock (both lying to the south). Hugglescote and Donington-le-Heath were part of Ibstock parish until 1878. A north-south track or lane stretching from Whitwick to Hugglescote crossed Long Lane, at the point where the clock tower war memorial now stands. This track or lane is now Mantle Lane and Belvoir Road. The Red House, an eighteenth-century building, close to this cross-roads, was one of very few buildings then standing.

Samuel Fisher, writing his memoirs at the end of the nineteenth century, described what the area looked like in 1832. Standing close to the position of the present-day clock tower, Fisher describes how, on looking down Long Lane towards Ashby, "we see a large tract of waste on both sides of the road, still traceable, covered with gorse-bushes, blackberry brambles, etc., with not a single house on either side of the way" until arriving at the Hoo Ash turnpike. Then, looking toward Hugglescote (down a track that is now Belvoir Road), "we see a magnificently timbered lane without a single house, with the exception of White Leys Farm and the Gate Inn on the Ashby Turnpike". In the direction of Bardon, there were no houses until arriving at a group of five or six cottages on the corner of what is now Whitwick Road and Hotel Street, and in the direction of Whitwick (the modern day Mantle Lane) there was nothing apart from a smithy and a carpenter's shop, and the houses of these tradesmen. These would have stood on the site of what is now The Springboard Centre (formerly Stablefords wagon works). From this wilderness emerged the modern town of Coalville, on a rapid scale, following the advent of deep coal mining.

Despite its emergence as one of the largest towns in Leicestershire, Coalville's history was not well documented until the establishment of historical societies in the 1980s, though some information had been put on record by a few independent local historians. In more recent years, a wealth of material charting the town's history has been published through the combined efforts of the Coalville 150 Group and the Coalville Historical Society and in 2006, these two groups amalgamated to form the Coalville Heritage Society.

=== Coal-mining ===
William Stenson

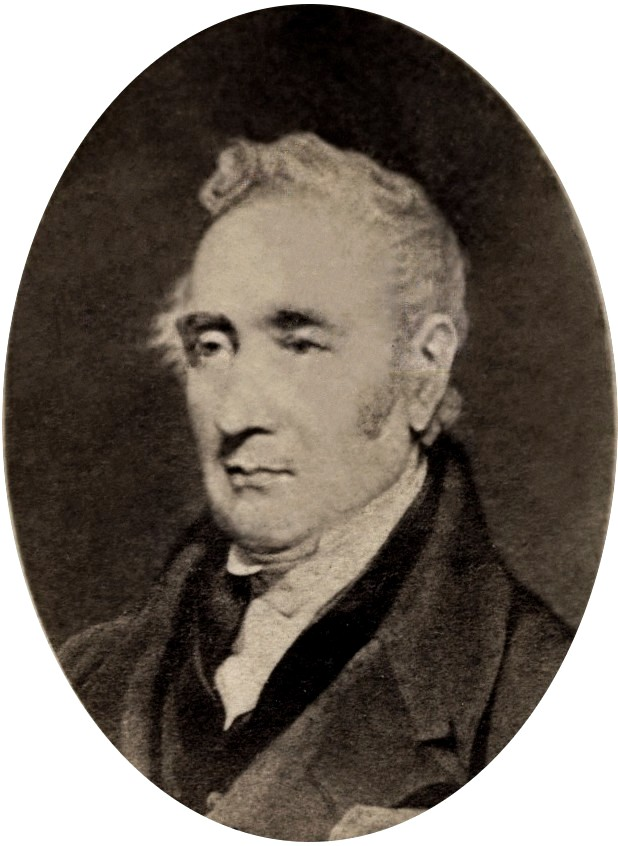
George Stephenson

Coal has been mined in the area since the medieval period, a heritage also traceable in the place name Coleorton, and examples of mine workings from these times can be found on the Hough Mill site at Swannington near the Califat Colliery site. A life-sized horse gin has been built on the Hough Mill site and craters can be seen in the ground, where the medieval villagers dug out their allocation of coal.

The seam is at ground level in Swannington, but gradually gets deeper between Swannington and the deepest reserves at Bagworth; consequently, it was not until mining technology advanced that shafts were sunk in the district now known as Coalville, beginning with Whitwick in 1824 and at Snibston in 1831.

Deep coal mining was pioneered by local engineer William Stenson who sank the Long Lane (Whitwick) Colliery on a relative's farm land in the 1820s. In doing so, Stenson ignored an old miner's dictum of the day, "No coal below stone", and sank his shaft through a layer of 'Greenstone' or 'Whinstone' to the coal below. This effectively opened up the 'concealed coalfield.' This was followed by the mine at Snibston, by George Stephenson in the early 1830s, and Stephenson was also responsible for the creation of the Leicester and Swannington Railway at the same time.

Quarrying, textile and engineering industries, such as railway wagon production, also grew in the town during the 19th century. Stenson is sometimes described as 'the Father of Coalville'.

Coal-mining came to an end in Coalville during the 1980s. Six collieries – Snibston, Desford, Whitwick, Ellistown, South Leicester and Bagworth – closed in and around Coalville in an eight-year period from 1983 to 1991, resulting in about five thousand men being made redundant.

The disused colliery at Snibston was regenerated into Snibston Discovery Park but controversially closed in 2015 by Leicestershire County Council. The area formerly occupied by Whitwick Colliery has been redeveloped as the Whitwick Business Park and which incorporates a Morrison's supermarket. There is also a small memorial garden here, established in memory of 35 men who died in the Whitwick Colliery Disaster of 1898, which occurred as a result of an underground fire, though the etched metal plaque commemorating this terrible calamity has (of 2014) been removed from the large granite memorial boulder.

=== Leicester and Swannington Railway ===
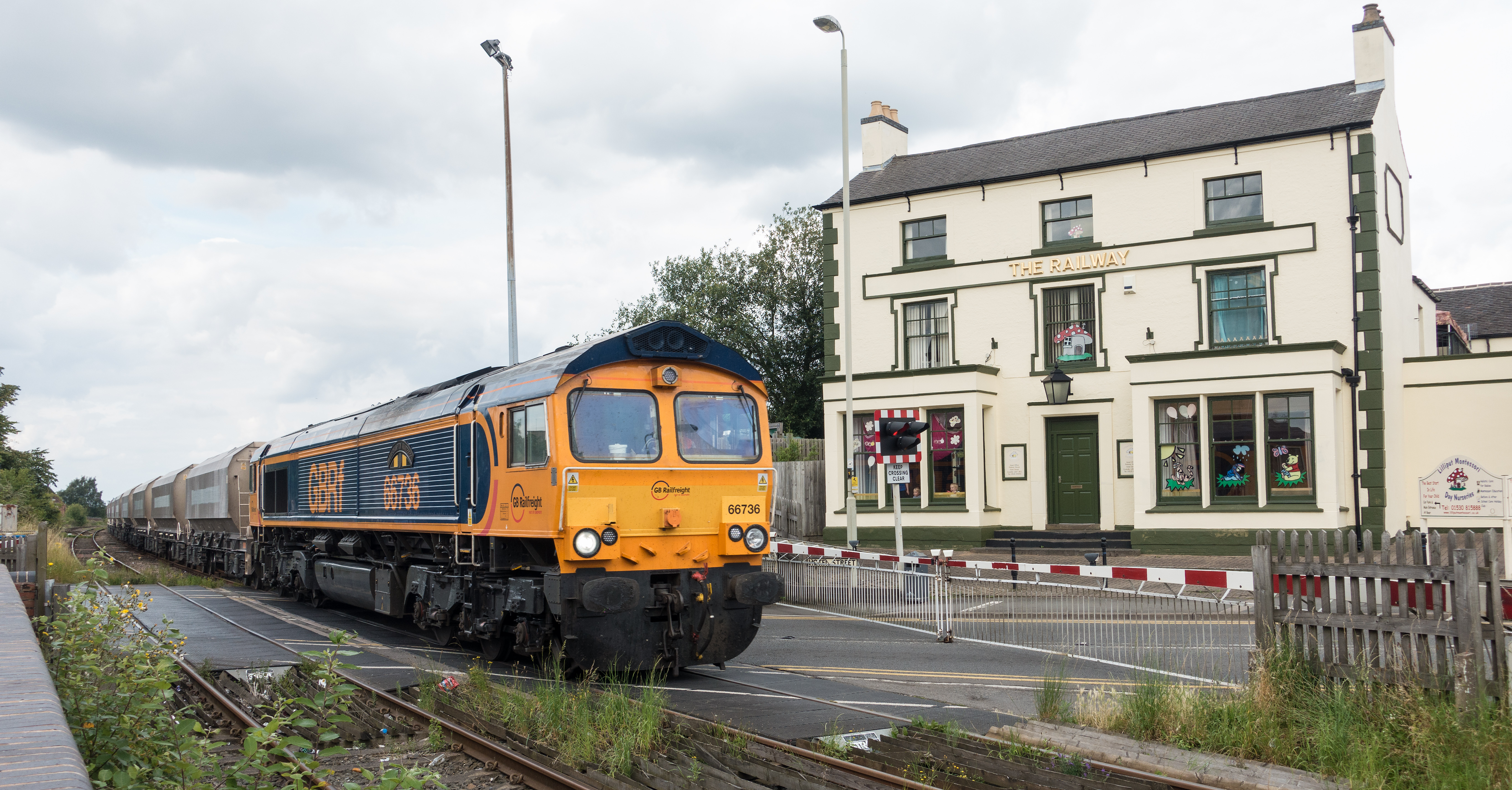
A Sheffield, Tinsley Yard, to Bardon Hill granite quarry empty freight train crossing High Street/Hotel Street in the centre of Coalville, July 2016. The building in the background was where passengers could buy tickets for the trains until the Midland Railway opened a proper station just beyond in 1848.

The Leicester and Swannington Railway – Leicestershire's first railway – opened in 1832, reaching Coalville in 1833, and had a small station at Long Lane (now High Street) in Coalville. Snibston Colliery opened in 1833. The railway was extended to Burton upon Trent in 1845, placing Coalville on an important route between Burton and Leicester. Heavy coal traffic encouraged the construction of further railways linking Coalville to Nuneaton and, later, Loughborough, over the Charnwood Forest Railway.

In the 20th century the railways to Nuneaton and Loughborough were closed and dismantled. Passenger services were withdrawn from the Leicester to Burton line in September 1964, but it remains open for goods traffic.

After 1993 there was a plan to restore passenger trains on the Leicester-Burton line through Coalville as an extension of Leicestershire's Ivanhoe Line. In 2013 a passenger train made a very rare pass through because of a cut off elsewhere and in the same year, a group known as 'The Campaign for Better Transport' petitioned for the freight track to be upgraded to mark the 50th anniversary of the network cuts introduced by Dr Beeching. The Leicester to Burton track was one of ten lines that this group called to be re-opened, with a proposal for it to be renamed the National Forest line. However, a spokesman for the County Council said, "We have been unable to reintroduce Leicester to Burton passenger trains because the costs of about £50 million to upgrade the route and £4 million per year to operate services do not represent good value for money."

=== Timeline ===
- 1824: Long Lane (Whitwick) colliery sunk by William Stenson
- 1831: George Stephenson's Snibston Colliery sunk
- 1833: George Stephenson's railway reached Coalville
- 1836: Coalville's first permanent place of worship opened (became the London Road General Baptist Church; now re-located as the Greenhill Community Church)
- 1836 – 1838: Coalville Church of England church (Christ Church) built/opened
- 1845: Burton-on-Trent and Leicester connected by rail, with Coalville "en route"
- 1858: The Bardon Hill granite quarrying company formed
- 1894: Coalville Urban District Council formed
- 1898: Whitwick Colliery Disaster
- 1900: First Roman Catholic Church built on Highfield Street (later replaced by St Wilfrid of York, London Road in the 1960s)
- 1909: Coalville Grammar School opened (Forest Road)
- 1919: Alfred Edward Pallett formed manufacturing company Cascelloid in Leicester (became 'Palitoy')
- 1920: Pallett's company produced its first toy
- 1925: Pallett's company produced its first doll
- 1925: Clock Tower (War Memorial) opened
- 1927: Leicestershire Miners' Association building in Bakewell Street opened
- 1930: Cscelloid bought by British Xylonite Limited (BXL)
- 1963: New Broadway Shopping Centre opened
- 1964: Passenger line closed on the railway
- 1968: Palitoy bought by US food company General Mills Inc
- 1974: Coalville Urban District dissolved and replaced by North West Leicestershire District
- 1975: Transferral of open-air market to newly constructed market hall
- 1980s: Demise of coal-mining industry
- 1985: Palitoy becomes Kenner Parker
- 1990: Morrison's supermarket built on the site of Whitwick Colliery
- 1992: Snibston Discovery Park opens
- 1994: Palitoy factory closed by new owners Hasbro
- 2005: Stephenson College new building opened
- 2005: Castle Rock High School new building opened
- 2009: Hermitage FM community radio station begins broadcasting on 99.2FM and online
- 2013: Tesco pulled out of the main town regeneration
- 2014: Broom Leys suburb was officially named
- 2015: Closure of Snibston Discovery Museum
- 2015: Ford Motors, Coalville, start work on the regeneration of the town
- 2018: Plans are drawn up by North west Leicestershire district council to redesign Marlborough Square.
- 2024: Hermitage FM ceased
- 2024: Coalville Public Radio created broadcasting on the internet and devices

== Governance ==
There are two tiers of local government covering Coalville, at district and county level: North West Leicestershire District Council and Leicestershire County Council. The district council meets at Stenson House on London Road in Coalville.

=== Administrative history ===
When the development of Coalville began in the 19th century, the area straddled the four parishes or townships of Whitwick, Hugglescote and Donington, Snibston and Swannington. The parish of Whitwick was made a local government district in 1864, which therefore had authority over the north-eastern parts of Coalville which lay within that parish.

In 1892 the Whitwick local government district was abolished and replaced by a larger Coalville district, covering the whole parish of Whitwick and parts of the neighbouring parishes of Hugglescote and Donington, Ravenstone with Snibston and Swannington.

Such local government districts were reconstituted as urban districts in 1894. Also in 1894, the parishes in the area were reorganised to stop parishes straddling district boundaries, after which there were three parishes in the urban district: a reduced Whitwick parish to the north, a reduced Hugglescote and Donington parish in the south, and a new Coalville parish in the centre. These three were urban parishes and so did not have parish councils of their own but were instead directly administered by the Coalville Urban District Council. In 1936 Thringstone was absorbed into the urban district, alongside boundary changes with other neighbouring parishes. At the same time the parishes within the urban district were merged into a single parish of Coalville.

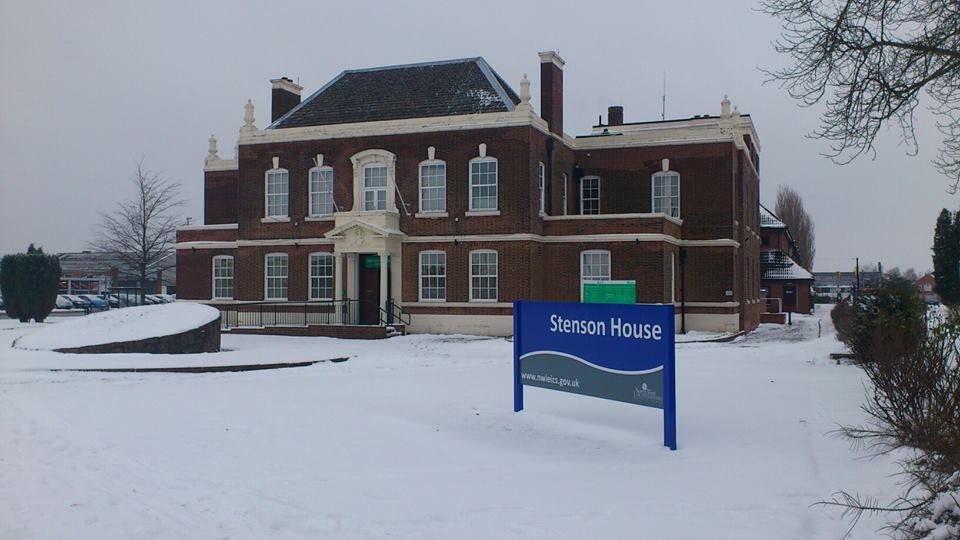
Stenson House, built 1934 as Municipal Offices

The urban district council built itself a headquarters called Municipal Offices on London Road in 1934, designed by Herbert Langman.

Coalville Urban District was abolished in 1974, becoming part of the new district of North West Leicestershire. No successor parish was created for the former urban district, and so it became an unparished area. New parishes have since been created from parts of the old urban district, being Ellistown and Battleflat in 2002 and Hugglescote and Donington le Heath and Whitwick, both created in 2011. Thringstone and the central part of Coalville remain unparished.

The old Municipal Offices were extended to become the headquarters of North West Leicestershire District Council, and were renamed Stenson House after Coalville's founder, William Stenson, whose house had stood on the site. Since 2012, the building has also served as the town's register office. The extended portion of the building was demolished in 2025.

== Economy ==
Within thirty years of the town's birth as a result of the collieries, many additional industries became established within the town, such as flour milling, brick making, engineering and the manufacture of elastic web.

During the twentieth century, Coalville was home to Palitoy, a toy manufacturer that made Action Man, Action Force, Tiny Tears, Pippa, Tressy, Merlin, Star Wars figures and the Care Bears. The company was founded by Alfred Edward Pallett in 1909 to produce celluloid and fancy goods. Their first toy was in 1920 and the first doll in 1925. The Palitoy site was closed in 1994.

Aggregate Industries has its headquarters at Bardon Hill Quarry and is one of the five largest construction material suppliers in the UK. The company was originally established in 1858, though an early reference to a granite quarry at Bardon Hill appeared in 1622, in William Burton's "Description of Leicestershire".

TEREX Pegson Limited is a UK manufacturer of mobile crushing machines, and is part of the Terex Corporation. Pegson is headquartered in Coalville, with a distribution centre for North America in Louisville, Kentucky. The manufacturing plant has been located for many years on Mammoth Street, off the Whitwick Road and the company is able to trace its origins to the company of Samuel Pegg and Son, which was originally set up on Alexander Street, Leicester in 1830, when its main concern was connected with hosiery machinery.

Tulip Foods (formerly Belvoir Bacon) on Mantle Lane was incorporated as a limited company on 1 July 1954, having started about twenty years previously, as a slaughterhouse supplying pork products to a local shop in Coalville owned by the Bloor family. By the 1960s the factory had begun to distribute its products nationally. The factory became known locally as "Piggy Bloor's". The Belvoir name was replaced by Tulip in 2003. In 2023 the factory was closed down and its future is not known.

Numerous business parks and industrial estates have been established in and around Coalville following the decline of coal-mining and allied industries. Calder Colours, based on the Coalville Business Park, are manufacturers of art and craft materials. In 2014 this company produced the hundreds of litres of red top coat and terracotta base coat paint for the commemorative art installation at the Tower of London entitled Blood Swept Lands and Seas of Red, marking the centenary of the outbreak of World War I.

In October 2016, Amazon opened in Coalville its biggest fulfilment Centre in the United Kingdom (named BHX2). Reportedly occupying an area equivalent to 19 football fields, the centre employs hundreds of citizens in the Leicestershire region and is operational twenty four hours a day.

== Transport ==
Arriva Midlands are the main operator for services from Coalville. Its buses operate to Leicester, Loughborough and Swadlincote. Roberts Travel Group operate service 159 to Hinckley and 125 to Leicester and Castle Donington. Trent Barton operate the Skylink bus service to East Midlands Airport and Nottingham.

The nearest passenger railway station is Loughborough, about 8 miles (13 kilometres) northeast of Coalville. The town used to be served by Coalville Town railway station on the Leicester to Burton upon Trent Line from 1848 to 1964. The line remains in-use for freight but is currently not expected to be reopened for passenger use, despite funding for the reopening being allocated in 2020.

== Religion ==
In the 2011 census, the electoral ward of Coalville had 5988 inhabitants with religious affiliation as follows: 60.1% Christian, 32.4% No religion, 0.6% Hindu, 0.3% Buddhist, 0.2% Muslim, 0.1% Agnostic, 0.1% Sikh. The town has a rich and diverse history of Christian places of worship. During the nineteenth and early twentieth centuries, numerous non-conformist chapels were established, some of which gave rise to break-away factions. Following the decline in the membership of traditional non-conformist societies, the town has seen the establishment of numerous evangelical free churches in more recent years. An official town guide, produced by the Coalville Urban District Council, circa 1968, has proved to be a useful source in chronicling the development and histories of early religious groups. The Anglican, Evangelical, Roman Catholic and 'non-conformist' churches in the district co-operate in an ecumenical alliance known as Coalville Christian Church Unity. The Jehovah's Witnesses and Spiritualist Church in the town are unconnected with this movement.

=== Church of England ===
Coalville was in earlier times divided between the parishes of Snibston and Whitwick. The parish of Christ Church, Coalville, was established in the mid-19th century. Since 1926 Coalville has been in the Diocese of Leicester; from 1539 to 1926 it was in the Diocese of Peterborough.

==== Parish church ====
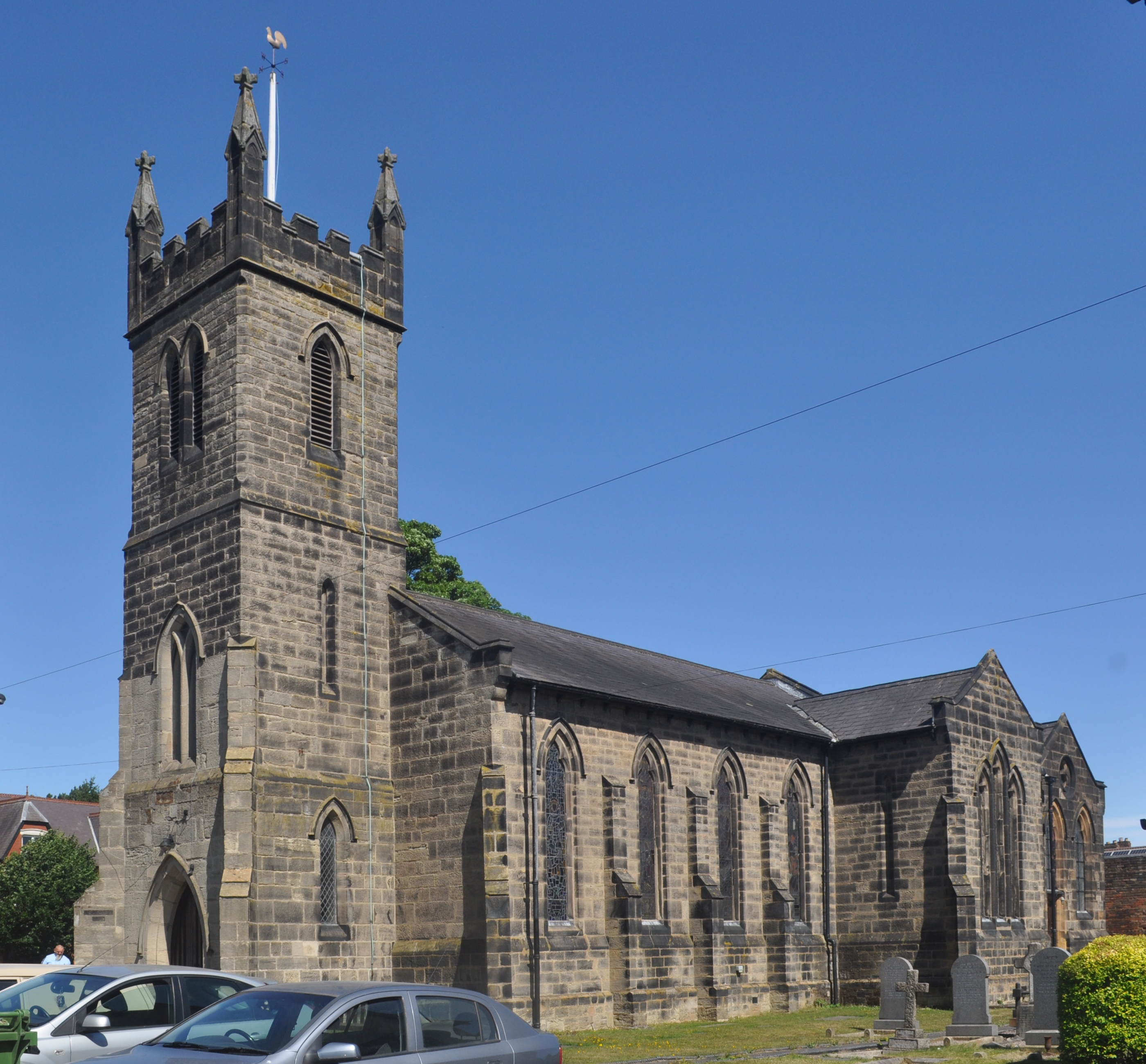
Coalville Parish Church

Coalville's parish church, Christ Church on London Road, was built between 1836 and 1838. The architect was H. I. Stevens of Derby. In 1853, a chancel was added, making the building cruciform, and the church was restored between 1894 and 1895. Vestries for the clergy and choir were erected on the north side of the chancel in 1936.

The building is a plain and routine example of Early English style revival, comprising nave, transepts, chancel and western tower. The nave is fairly unusual in that its north and south aisles are not separated from the nave by arcades. The tower contains four bells, played on a clavier and has embattled parapets; access to the church is via the main west door, located in the ground floor stage of the tower. The local historian, Edgar Hawthorn, claims that construction of the church was funded by George Stephenson, though this assertion has been called into question by more recent historians.

The tower contained a single bell until 1936, when a further three bells were presented by Dr Francis E. Knowles of America. Dr Knowles had ordered these bells from the foundry of John Taylor at Loughborough, but in the meantime, the church in America was destroyed by a tornado. Through the influence of the then vicar, the Reverend W. A. J. Martyr, Dr Knowles (originally of Melbourne in Derbyshire) was persuaded to present them to Christ Church, Coalville.

The church houses a brass memorial plaque to the victims of the Whitwick Colliery Disaster (1898) and the gravestone of James Stephenson, who came here through the influence of his brother, George Stephenson, the engineer, to work as an official at the Snibston Colliery. There is a memorial to the fallen of the parish of both World War I and II in the Lady Chapel. This is in the form of a reredos behind the chapel altar. In 1859, an Act of Parliament decreed that 'for the protection of the public health', no further burials should take place in the church yard, 'with the exception of the part of the ground on the south of the church, in which no burial shall take place, except in brick graves, in which each coffin shall be separately entombed in an air-tight manner'. The same legislation also ordered that 'burials be wholly discontinued in the General Baptist Chapel Burial-ground', which was located just a short distance away from the church, near the present day council offices.

The small churchyard contains the grave of Amos Clarke, who, although blind from the age of eight days, was organist at Christ Church for some fifty years. Following his death in 1930, he was buried on the south side of the church as near to the organ as possible – at his own request.

The longest serving vicar of Christ Church was the Reverend William Gardner, who held the living for thirty-three years. The east window was installed as a memorial to Gardner, his wife and daughter.

==== All Saints' Mission Church ====
Due to the rapid growth of the town in the 19th century, a mission church known as "All Saints'" was erected on Ashby Road in 1895, on a site given by Messrs T. and J. Jones of Coalville. This was served by the clergy of the parish church.

==== St Mary's, Snibston ====
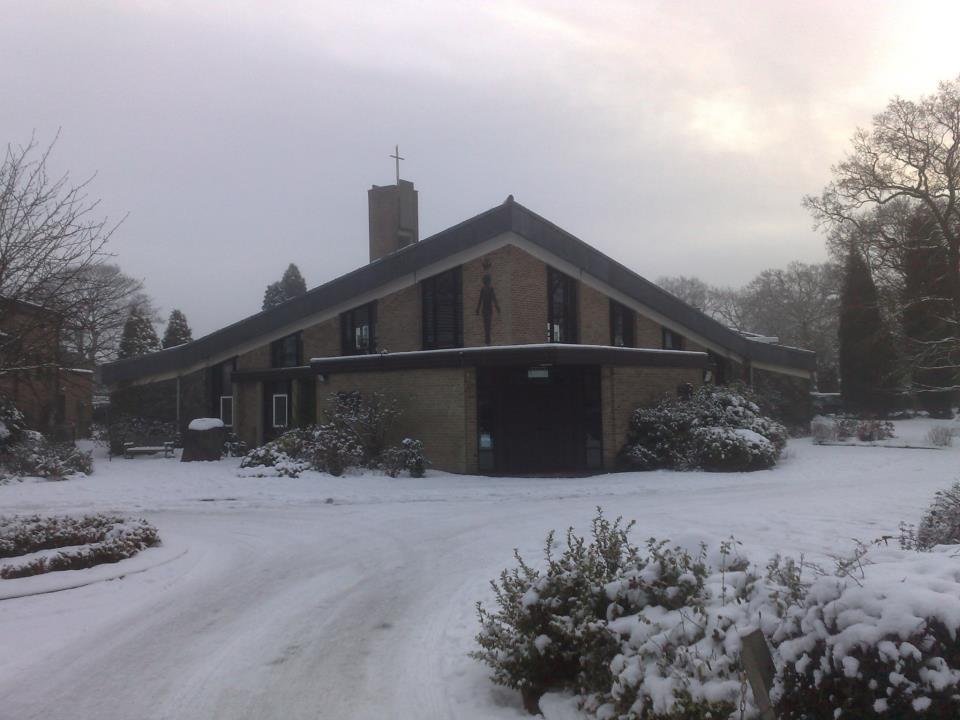
Saint David's Church, Broom Leys

St Mary's, Snibston is an ancient parish church set in a rural location close to Coalville. The church building is notable for being very small, no longer than twenty-four feet, comprising a nave and chancel in one. The fabric is mainly medieval, though the current lancet windows were installed in 1847. The foundations of a tower were discovered in 1930. Until a Coalville parish (the Christ Church parish) was created, Snibston parish covered much of the south-westerly part of the area that is now Coalville.

==== St David's, Broom Leys ====
St David's (Church of England, founded in 1933) is in a northerly suburb of Coalville. The present building was built in the 1960s.

=== Baptists ===
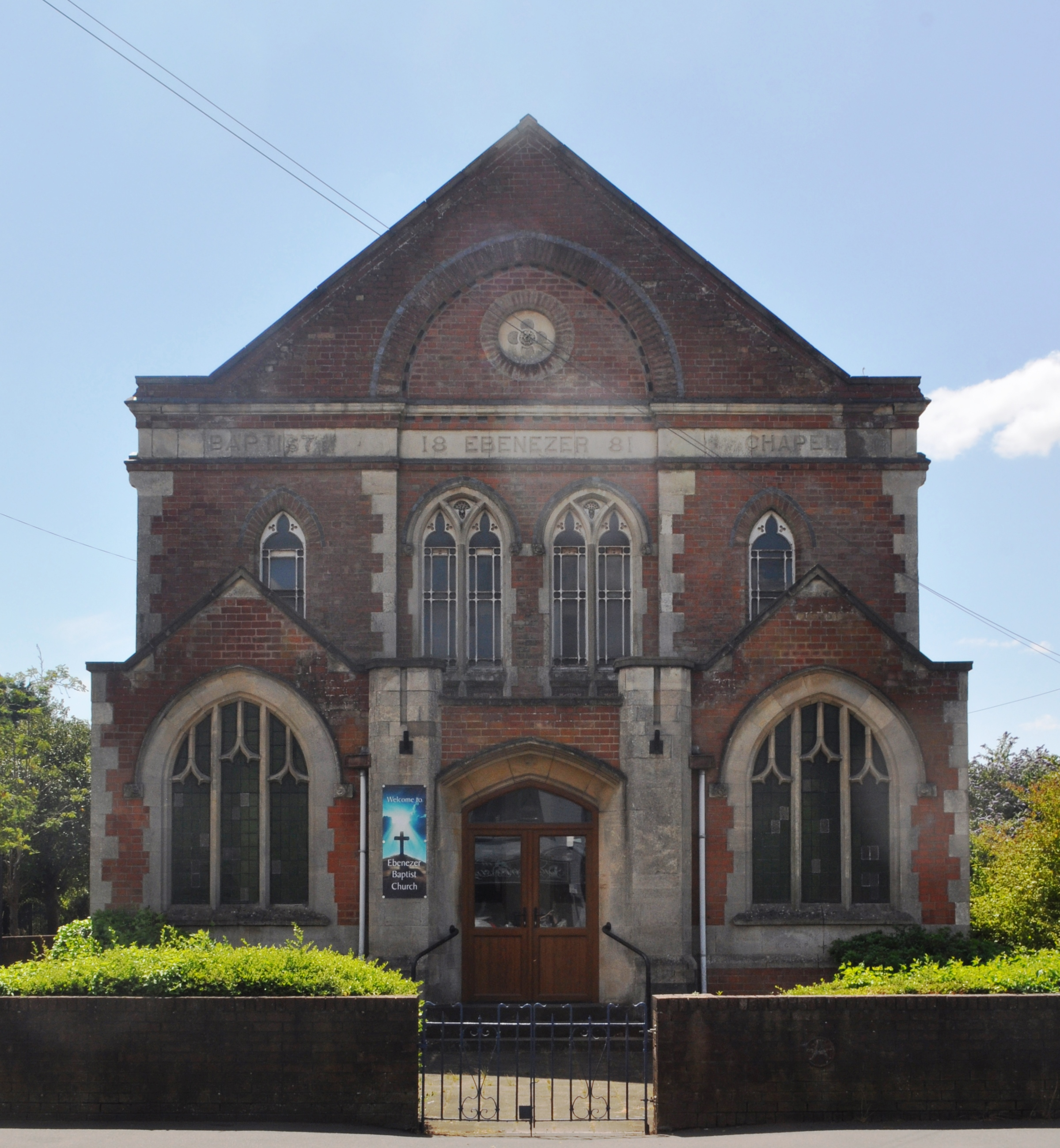
Ebenezer Baptist Church (1881)

There were, at one time, three different Baptist churches within the town of Coalville – belonging to General Baptists, Strict Baptists and Particular Baptists.

The General Baptist chapel in Coalville was built on land provided by the Whitwick Colliery Company and occupied a site close to the present day council offices, at the junction of London Road and Whitwick Road. This church, which became known as the London Road Baptist Chapel, became the first permanent place of worship in Coalville when services began in 1836. Built at a cost of £560, the chapel had 600 sittings and a Sunday School attached. For many years after its demolition, the junction on which it had stood was still referred to as 'Chapel Corner'.

Following the chapel's closure, the congregation transferred to a new premises at Greenhill known as the Charnborough Road Baptist Church, which was registered for solemnising marriages on 15 March 1955. This church is still in use and is now known as the Greenhill Community Church, being affiliated to the Baptist Union.

In 1852, a society of Strict Baptists built a chapel known as "Cave Adullam" on the opposite side of the road to the General Baptist Chapel on London Road. According to local writer, Elizabeth Hewes, this was erected by William Stenson – the founder of Whitwick Colliery – who was a staunch baptist, as a more "select place of worship" for himself and his wife. Stenson lived just a very short distance away, also on the London Road, on a site which is today marked by a brass plaque. The local historian, Dennis Baker does not mention Stenson's involvement with this chapel, attributing its formation to a break-away movement from the General Baptist chapel as a result of doctrinal differences. Stenson was undoubtedly a pioneer of the Baptist mission in Coalville however, and his grave can be found in the old Baptist cemetery off Grange Road, Hugglescote.

This chapel was still flourishing in 1907, when it was redecorated, with "Strict Baptist" newly painted on the door. It was probably this chapel that was the one referred to as a "Calvinist chapel" in Kelly's Directory of 1881. Another source has it as a "Calvinistic" chapel. The building still exists and is now occupied by the Balti Tower Indian restaurant and an oriental food store. For many years after its closure, part of the building was occupied by "Kemp's grocery store". The stone plaque, bearing the name, "Cave Adullam" can still be seen set above the frontage; this term has its origins in the Bible (I Samuel, 22:I).

In 1879, further doctrinal differences led to 149 members of the General Baptist Chapel being erased from their communion. Seventy three of these individuals then formed themselves into a Particular Baptist Chapel and went on to build the Ebenezer Baptist Church on Ashby Road, which was completed in 1881. Whilst the church was being built, services were conducted in an old wagon repair shop. Structural alterations and additions were made to the building in 1908 and instead of two entrances to the church, one main entrance was made, as it is today. The church once played a prominent part in the musical life of the town, and it was here that the Snibston Colliery Miner's Welfare Silver Prize Band was formed.

=== Congregationalist (United Reformed Church) ===
Congregationalism would appear to have been the first Protestant non-conformist religion active in the Coalville district.

Following Restoration of the Monarchy in 1660, the re-establishment of the bishops, and Parliament's attempt in 1662 to impose a single form of religious observance throughout England (the Act of Uniformity 1662), the vicar of Ravenstone (John Shuttlewood or Sittlewood) was removed from office in 1660, the vicar of Whitwick (John Bennett) was removed from office in 1662 and William Sheffield (a former rector of Ibstock, but who had moved to Stoke Golding where he was a curate) was suspended on 13 October 1662. All three became Nonconformist or Dissenting preachers. Shuttlewood and Bennett were both later imprisoned for Nonconformity.

The moated old Bardon Hall at Bardon Park became a place of Dissenting worship, and was registered as such after persecution of Dissent had eased. After the events known as the Glorious Revolution (1688) and the Act of Toleration 1689, the owner of Bardon Hall and Park built the Bardon Park chapel or meetinghouse at the gate of his estate, as a place for non-conforming worship.

The Bardon Park Chapel, situated about three miles (five kilometres) from Coalville, is a Grade II Listed building, widely regarded as being the oldest non-conformist place of worship in Leicestershire. Built in about 1694, the chapel was affiliated to the Congregational Union from about 1830. In 1972, the Congregationalists united nationally with the Presbyterians to form the United Reformed Church. The "Bardon Chapel" thus serves as the modern day United Reformed Church for the communities of Coalville and North West Leicestershire.

Around 1800, the then minister at the Bardon Park Chapel opened a chapel at Donington-le-Heath. This building was relatively short-lived and was eventually demolished. Its exact location is unknown. From the 1840s until circa 1870, the Bardon Park Chapel operated a day-school at Bardon Park, in the hall to the rear of the chapel. This school was affiliated to the British and Foreign School Society. (BFSS schools were often known as "British Schools", distinguishing them from the "National Schools" affiliated to the Church of England). A painted alphabet board on the wall of the old schoolroom at Bardon Park Chapel dates from the 1840s.

Around 1900, the Bardon Park Congregational Chapel became concerned that it was not sufficiently influencing the spiritual life of the town of Coalville and opened a new chapel in the town. This was "an iron building which used to stand on what is now the flower plot at the corner of Broom Leys Road and London Road" and the building was also used as a place of worship by a society of United Methodists, before they built their own church on the London Road in 1910. A house called "Hazeldine Villa", adjacent to the iron building, was the residence of the Congregationalist minister. The mission proved to be a short lived venture however, as Hazeldine and the iron chapel were sold off in 1909.

=== Free churches ===
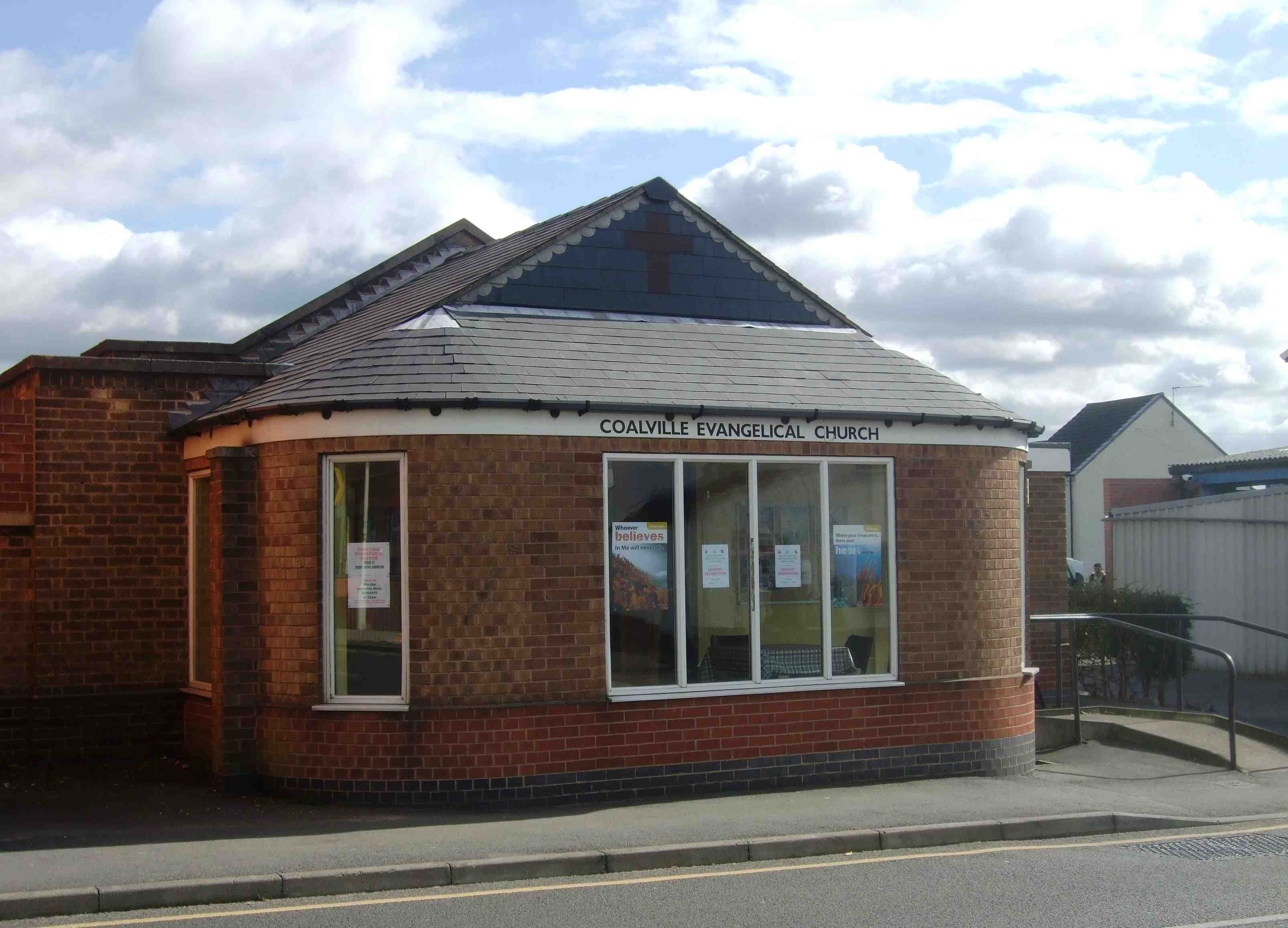
Coalville Evangelical Church

Coalville Evangelical Church, is an independent church affiliated with the Fellowship of Independent Evangelical Churches, located on Belvoir Road, having taken over from a now defunct Open Brethren congregation on the site.

‘’’Living Rock Church’’’ is an evangelical church which meets on the first Sunday of each month at Rothley House (the former Palitoy factory off Jackson Street. Their website is www.livingrock.church

The New Life Church is an evangelical free church on Margaret Street, which occupies a premises which was formerly a working men's club.

A Pentecostal church, "Full Gospel Mission", affiliated with the Elim Pentecostal Churches of Great Britain, meets in a building established in James Street in the late 1950s. It was extended and upgraded in the 1980s.

The Yesterday, Today and Forever Church is an independent evangelical church which was established in the former Salvation Army Hall on Gutteridge Street.

=== Jehovah's Witnesses ===
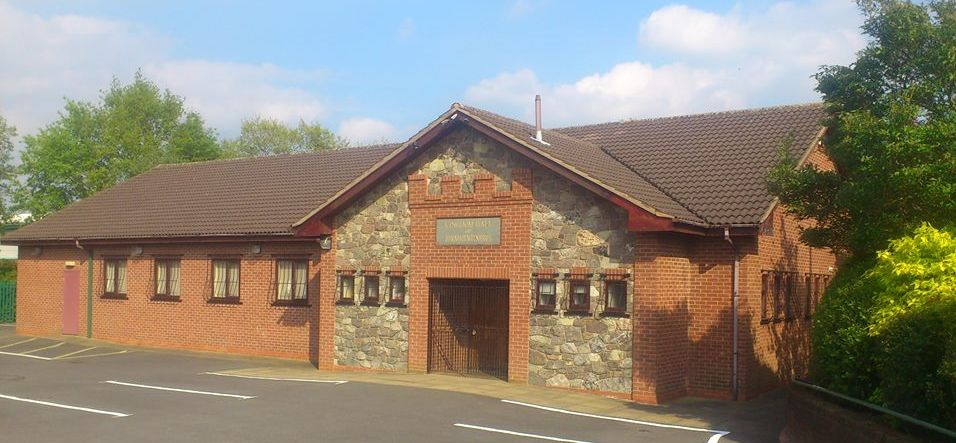
Kingdom Hall of Jehovah's Witnesses, Coalville

Jehovah's Winesses have a modern 'Kingdom Hall' on Albert Road, replacing one which formerly stood on Ashby Road. The building comprises a brick built rectangular hall, with a gabled entrance lobby on the west side, which is faced with stone ashlar and within which is a castellated brick façade containing the main door.

=== Methodism ===
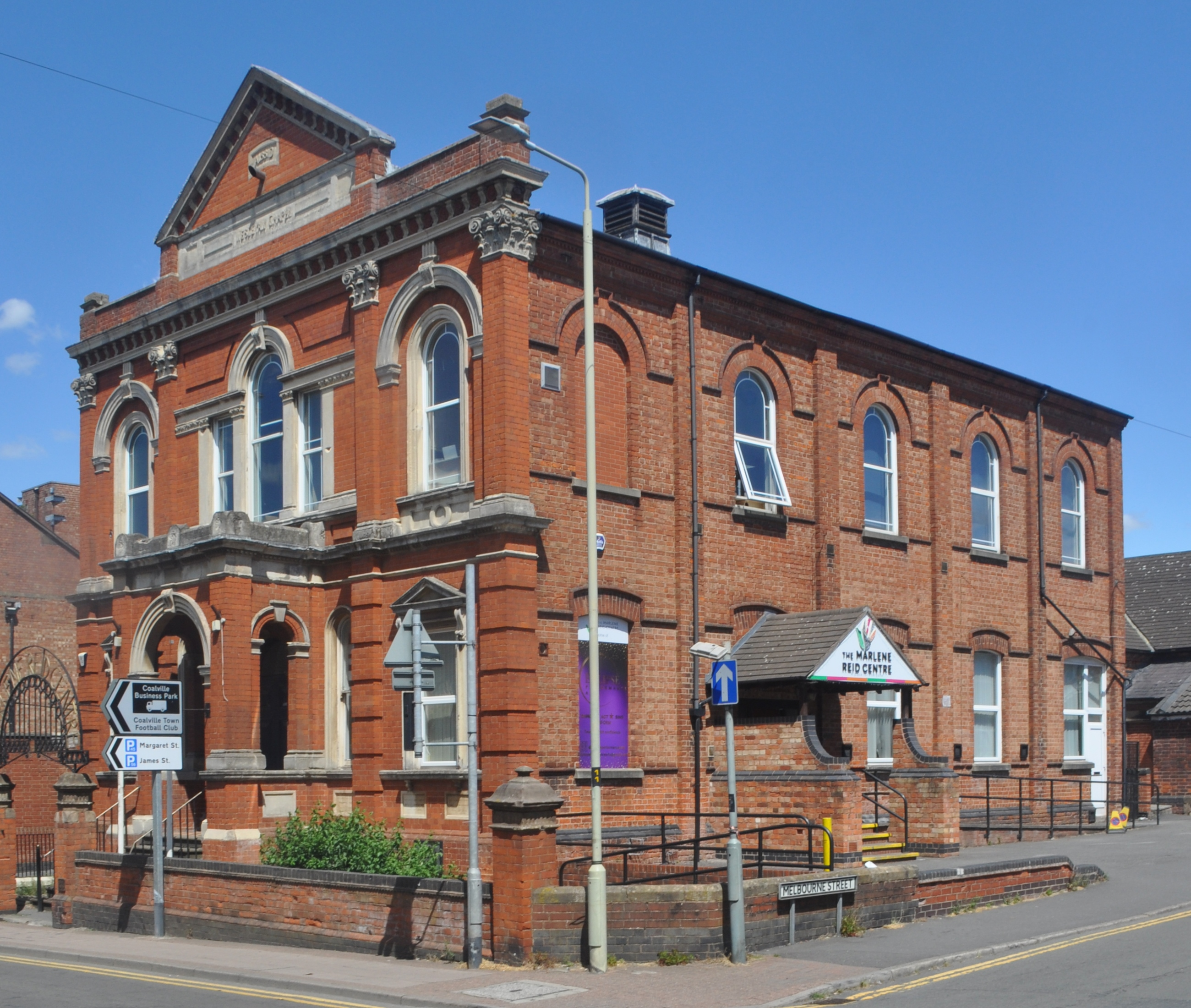
The former Wesleyan Methodist chapel at Belvoir Road (1881)

There were, at one time, three different Methodist factions active within the town of Coalville – the Primitive Methodists, the United Methodists and the Wesleyan Methodists – and each had its own chapel. All of these societies united nationally in 1932 and their buildings became known simply as 'Methodist Churches'. The three Methodist congregations all eventually amalgamated locally and were assimilated within the church in Marlborough Square, which is the present day Coalville Methodist Church.

Another Methodist faction – the Wesleyan Reform Methodists – did not enter into the national Methodist Union of 1932 and this organisation still has an independent church on the outskirts of the town, at New Swannington (at the Whitwick end of Thornborough Road), which was built in 1906. There are also Wesleyan Reform chapels in the nearby townships of Ellistown and Ibstock.

The Primitive Methodists originally had a place of worship on Ashby Road, and also a Sunday School, in a building that later became known as the 'Snibstone Band Room'. This was used from 1832 until 1861 and was eventually sold to the Baptists and is now the site of the Ebenezer Baptist Church.

In 1861, a Primitive Methodist Church was built next to the railway crossing on Belvoir Road. This structure still exists, with lancet windows still visible at the rear of the premises as one walks along the footpath which follows the route of the old railway line. This church was in turn replaced by a new building in Marlborough Square in 1903, and which is now known as the Marlborough Square Methodist Church. This was built to seat 600 people, with school hall, vestries and classrooms.

The Wesleyan Methodist Chapel building (erected in 1881) still exists on Belvoir Road and is now used as a community resource, known as the Marlene Reid Centre, named in commemoration of Marlene Reid of Whitwick who died in 1986, and whose own disability inspired her to pioneer local voluntary services, also earning her Leicestershire's 'Woman of the Year' award in 1983.

The United Methodists had a church on London Road. This was founded in 1910 on land acquired by the United Methodist Church in Loughborough. Following the Methodist national union in 1932, the London Road Church continued to be served from Loughborough until 1943, when the chapel was transferred to the Coalville circuit and was served by a minister who lived opposite, at No. 76 London Road . The church was once known for its lovely garden, but closed some years ago and has since been demolished, the site subsequently being used for new housing.

=== Plymouth Brethren ===
A congregation is recorded meeting in a room in Hugglescote in the 1880s and 1890s, and by the turn of the century in a room in Coalville. This may have been the same meeting place, as the boundaries of Coalville had been extended through the local government reforms. A permanent meeting place was built on Belvoir Road to house an "Open" Brethren congregation; named in typically utilitarian fashion as "Belvoir Road Hall". Its congregation steadily reduced during the 1960s and 70's, becoming unsustainable and eventually selling the building to Coalville Evangelical Church (see above).

=== Roman Catholicism ===
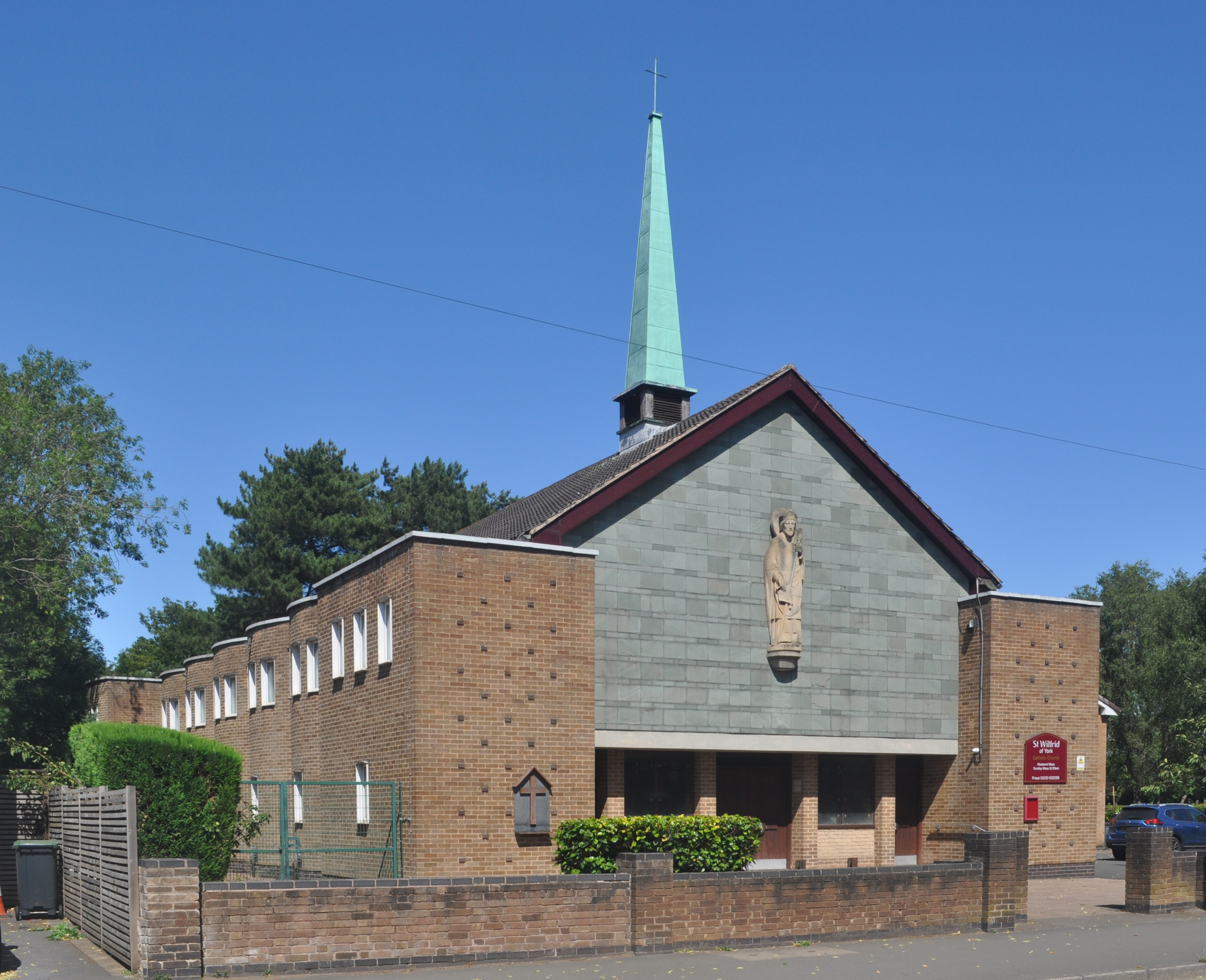
St Wilfrid's Church (1961)

The neighbouring parish of Whitwick was a focal point in the Roman Catholic revival early in the nineteenth century due to the zealous missionary work instigated by Ambrose de Lisle of Gracedieu Manor, a mission which eventually spread to encompass the new town of Coalville. Until 1887, the small community of Catholics residing in Coalville had to travel to Whitwick to celebrate Mass. In that year, Mass was first celebrated in a private house on Ashby Road and services were subsequently held in a local dance hall and later in a theatre owned by Mr Charles Tyler. After a few years, Mr Edwin de Lisle offered to build a temporary church, entirely at his own expense, on a site on Highfield Street, which had previously been acquired by Father Matthew O'Reilly, the parish priest at Whitwick. This was an oblong building of corrugated iron.

In the year 1900, again through the generosity of Mr de Lisle, a new church was erected on the site and which was opened by Edward Bagshawe, the Roman Catholic Bishop of Nottingham in the presence of a large gathering of the general public. This church was built of simple pitch pine, though had a highly decorative interior. Later enlarged and furnished by the Reverend Joseph Degen, it was dedicated to Saint Saviour (San Salvador) under the title of the Transfiguration. The high altar in this church had formerly belonged to the reformatory school for boys, which was at one time connected with Mount Saint Bernard's Abbey and there are references to this altar in 'Household Words' by Charles Dickens.

In 1913, Coalville became a Roman Catholic parish in its own right, under the guidance of Father Joseph Degen, a local activist who championed the cause of the local mining community. Under his guidance, the Catholic community grew substantially and in 1956 a church hall was erected on Ibstock Road in Ellistown, to relieve the congestion in the church of Saint Saviour's.

In June 1961, the modern day Saint Wilfrid of York Catholic Church by Desmond Williams was built on London Road, next to the Coalville Park. The church is noted as having some architectural merit, and preserving much of its original character. The western facade of the church is clad in green Swithland slate with a carved stone statue of St Wilfrid in the gable by Michael Clark, and the side walls comprise a series of shallow curved bays with two tiers of segment-headed windows.

Another important development within the Coalville Roman Catholic community was the founding of the Convent of the Poor Clares, on Forest Road, close by the railway bridge "where the Sisters dedicate themselves to the education of the children of Saint Wilfred's Parish". The present school was opened and formally blessed by the Right Reverend Bishop McGuiness in May 1976. The Cistercian monastery of Mount Saint Bernard Abbey is also close to the town, on the fringe of Charnwood Forest.

=== Salvationist ===
The Salvation Army formerly had a purpose-built hall on Gutteridge Street, though due to a decline in its membership this building was recently sold off and is now used by an evangelical free church.

=== Spiritualist ===
There is also the Spiritualists' National Union on Bridge Road. The Bridge Road building was formerly a Unitarian chapel.

=== Unitarian and Free Christian ===
A Unitarian hall was opened on Bridge Road in September 1908 and functioned until 1946. A Spiritualist congregation subsequently took over the building.

== Education ==
The town has a Further and Higher Education College, Stephenson College which is now part of the Loughborough College Group and is a technical and trade campus. In 2005, The college moved from former mining college buildings near the town centre of what is now Adam Morris Way to the purpose built building located beside the A511. Part of the campus was inhabited by Stephenson Studio School, which opened to students in September 2011, and catered for ages 14–18. The school closed in 2024.

The Castle Rock School (formerly Castle Rock High School and King Edward VII Science and Sport College) caters for 11–18-year-olds, providing GCSEs, A-Levels and a number of vocational courses. The Newbridge School (formerly Newbridge High School) caters for 11–18-year-olds, with a student population of around 600. It celebrated its centenary as a school building in 2009, having originally opened as the Coalville Grammar School.

The town has a number of primary schools including All Saints Church of England Primary School, Belvoirdale Primary School, Broom Leys Primary School, Warren Hills Primary School, St Clare's Catholic Primary School and Greenstone Primary School.

In the nineteenth century, a day-school operated in the premises of the Bardon Park Chapel (see Other places of worship/Congregationalist, below) from the 1840s until around the time of the Elementary Education Act 1870. This day-school was affiliated to the British and Foreign School Society.

== Museums ==
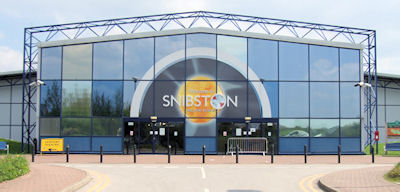
Snibston Discovery Museum

Snibston Discovery Museum, was located off Ashby Road and was built on part of the site of the former Snibston Colliery. It featured interactive exhibits, an 0-4-0ST steam locomotive, a fashion gallery and more. The museum focused on technology and design and how it affects everyday life.

Early 2015, Conservative-controlled Leicestershire County Council announced that the museum would be closed due to its £900,000 annual running cost. The cabinet member for museums, Councillor Richard Blunt, said that it was hoped a smaller mining heritage museum would replace the existing museum. He also asserted that the country park would be preserved and expanded and that the Century Theatre would remain open.

The Discovery Museum closed on 31 July 2015. It was reported that the council had dropped the idea of having a mining heritage museum to replace Snibston and had insisted that there were no long-term plans for the site's redevelopment. Demolition of the main hall commenced in March 2016.

Donington le Heath Manor House Museum is based on a medieval manor house dating back to about 1280 and which was a family home for 700 years. The site was acquired by the local authority in the late twentieth century having fallen into a state of disrepair, and was subsequently redeveloped into a museum. The house is believed to have once been owned by Sir Everard Digby, a member of the group responsible for the Gunpowder Plot of 1605.

== Culture ==
The Coalville Male Voice Choir, (Formerly known as the Coalville and District Male Voice Choir), was formed in 1944. Paul Hayward is only the sixth musical director in the choir's seventy four-year history, having succeeded Dr Georgie Lorimer, Cynthia Moseley, Aubrey Ward, Les Anderson and Harry Toon. The town is also home to the Broom Leys Choral Society.

The town also has a tradition of brass band history and is home to the Desford Colliery Band, founded in 1898. Their club, known as 'The Brass House', is located on Albert Road.

The Coalville Amateur Operatic Society was formed in 1919, and has been staging operas, modern musicals and concerts in the Coalville area ever since. The society currently meets for rehearsals on Monday evenings at The Brass House, Albert Road, and on Thursday evenings at The Methodist Church in Malborough Square, both venues located near the town centre.

The Old Adult School Hall and Theatre on Bridge Road is the home of the Coalville Drama Group, formerly known as the Coalville Adult School Drama Group. The Drama Group has been presenting plays, dramas, comedies, pantomimes and other productions since the mid fifties. The Drama Group meets on Tuesday and Friday evenings. The Drama Group enjoys a long and unbroken history of presenting plays at the Hall, four times a year.

== Media ==
Established in 1893, the Coalville Times is a weekly newspaper that covers the town and the whole of North West Leicestershire, as well as areas of South Derbyshire and Hinckley and Bosworth. It is situated on Bridge Road, Coalville, where the Ashby Times and Swadlincote Times are also produced.

Television signals can only be received from the Sutton Coldfield TV transmitter which broadcast BBC West Midlands and ITV Central (West) from Birmingham. However, BBC East Midlands and ITV Central (East) are also received through cable and satellite television such as Freesat and Sky.

Local radio stations are BBC Radio Leicester on 104.9 FM, Smooth East Midlands on 101.4 and 106.6 FM, Capital Midlands on 102.8 FM, Greatest Hits Radio Midlands on 106.0 FM, Hits Radio East Midlands on DAB, Fosse FM and Carillon Radio which broadcast to hospital patients at the Coalville Hospital in the town.

Launched on 14 November 2009, Hermitage FM was the community broadcaster for North West Leicestershire. It had a community coffee lounge based in its premises in Memorial Square. It was announced in early 2024 that both the radio station and coffee lounge will close.

In November 2024, a new community radio station launched called Coalville Public Radio.

== Sport ==
Coalville Town Football Club – known as 'The Ravens' currently play in the Southern League Premier Division Central. In 2010–11, Coalville reached the FA Vase final becoming the first Leicestershire team to achieve a place in the final. Coalville have reached the 1st round of the FA Cup on two occasions in 2004 and 2022.

The Coalville Rugby Football Club was founded in 1902 and has a modern clubhouse off Hall Lane, Whitwick, replacing one that had previously stood on Broom Leys Road.

The District Council's Hermitage Leisure Centre off Silver Street, Whitwick, was officially opened on 30 April 1981 by Olympic athlete Sebastian Coe. Facilities included four squash courts, a multi-purpose room with weight training equipment and a bar. Sebastian Coe returned in 1987 to open a further phase, incorporating a multi-purpose sports hall and health suite. External facilities included a floodlit all-weather play area, fishing lake and sports pitches.

In February 2022, the council announced the opening of a £22.5 million flagship leisure development, the Whitwick and Coalville Leisure Centre, based around an eight-lane, 25-metre competition swimming pool. The old Hermitage Leisure Centre building and surrounding playing fields are to close, with the future usage undecided.

A fishing lake occupied the site of a former clay quarry which filled with water after disuse for some years following the demise of the adjacent brick-making works, all trace of which has now disappeared following the development of the Hermitage sports complex.

The Coalville Greyhound Stadium existed on Belvoir Road from 1927 until 1990. The greyhound racing was independent (not affiliated to the sports governing body the National Greyhound Racing Club) but it was a popular venue within the flapping (nickname for independent tracks) fraternity despite being unaffiliated. Afghan Hound races also took place here.

Leicestershire County Cricket Club have played first-class cricket at three venues in Coalville: the Fox and Goose Ground, the Town Ground and Snibston Colliery Ground.

== Political history ==
Traditionally, district of Coalville was a Labour Party stronghold, and until the 1990s, Labour held 36 out of the 40 seats on the district council, with its industrial and coal-mining heritage seen as a deterministic factor in its political profile. In the early twenty first century however, the localised political landscape changed drastically, with control of the district council ceding to the Conservatives. In 2015, the council's website shows that there are currently 20 Conservative councillors compared to 16 for Labour and 1 for the Liberal Democrats, with 1 member sitting as an independent. In 2009, the British National Party gained its first seat on the Leicestershire County Council, when their candidate, Graham Partner, took the Coalville seat from the Labour Party with a majority of 86. Labour regained the seat in the council elections of 2013 however, with Partner (who had by then defected to the British Democrats) coming in fourth place and UKIP coming second.

Election result for the division of Coalville – Leicestershire County Council, 2 May 2013

Candidate	Party	Candidate votes (2013)	Candidate share (2013)	Party votes (2009)	Party share (2009)
Terri Enyon	Labour Party	1294	44.7%	840	22.4%
Phil Holland	UKIP	825	28.5%	0	0.0%
John Cotterill	Conservative Party	476	16.4%	953	25.4%
Graham Ronald Partner	British Democrats	215	7.4%	0	0.0%
Lee James Windram	Liberal Democrats	84	2.9%	326	8.7%

Election Result for the Division of Coalville – Leicestershire County Council, 4 June 2009

Candidate	Party	Candidate votes (2009)	Candidate share (2009)	Party votes (2005)	Party share (2005)
Graham Partner	British National Party	1039	27.7%	0	0.0%
Paula Diane Purver	Conservative Party	953	25.4%	1419	24.4%
John Legrys	Labour Party	840	22.4%	1976	33.9%
Phil Holland	Independent	592	15.8%	1620	27.8%
Sue Morrell	Liberal Democrats	326	8.7%	807	13.9%

Coalville has been part of two parliamentary constituencies since the end of the World War I], which has seen the election of representatives from all three traditional political parties. From 1918 until 1983, Coalville had been part of the Bosworth parliamentary constituency, which was represented by Liberal, Labour and Conservative members of parliament throughout this period. Since 1983, Coalville has lain within the parliamentary constituency of North West Leicestershire, which has been represented by both Conservative and Labour members of parliament (MPs), the current MP being Amanda Hack of the Labour Party.

== Buildings and landmarks ==
Coalville has few listed buildings. The central core of the town is characterised by streets of homogeneous terraced housing, built toward the end of the nineteenth century and during the early part of the twentieth century, with detached housing concentrated on the London Road and Forest Road.

In June 2014, it was reported that consideration was being given by the local district council to the designation of the Coalville town centre as a conservation area, something which English Heritage has encouraged. In a letter to the council, English Heritage stated, "Coalville is a good example of the type of commercial and industrial settlement that grew up rapidly in the 19th century following the discovery of coal, but which in Leicestershire is somewhat unusual and it has a number of 19th and 20th century gems, such as the Rex Cinema".

A well-known landmark at the centre of the town is the clock tower, a war memorial in memory of Coalville's fallen soldiers in the Great War. The memorial clock tower was designed by Henry Collings and built by W Moss Ltd in 1925 at a cost of £2,250. It was designed to replace the first cenotaph to The Fallen which had been installed in the boundary wall of the railway station in 1919. The memorial clock was officially opened by Mrs Booth of Gracedieu Manor at a memorial service on 31 October 1925. Ten thousand people attended and the Coalville Company of the 5th Leicestershire Regiment led a procession, headed by the regimental band. A procession of ex-servicemen and a detachment of C squadron of the Leicestershire Yeomanry marched from Whitwick and another party of ex-servicemen, including 22 surviving members of the 'first fifty' was led from the Fox and Goose public house by The Hugglescote and Ellistown Band. The tower rises 68 feet above pavement level and is a Grade II listed building. The building was admired by the architectural critic and historian, Nikolaus Pevsner.

In addition to the clock tower war memorial, three other buildings in Coalville have been given Grade II listed status; the parish church of Christ Church, the former Railway Hotel and the Castle Rock Sixth Form College, formerly a country house, attributed to Pugin.

Broom Leys House (now known as Broom Leys School) is possibly the best example of a wealthy Victorian's house in the area. The house was built on the site of an eighteenth-century farmhouse purchased by William Whetstone in 1845 and designed by the eminent architect, Joseph Goddard. Whetstone was the owner of Ibstock Colliery and a former Lord Mayor of Leicester. In 1908, the house was bought by Horace Rendall Mansfield, the Member of Parliament for Spalding, Lincolnshire, subsequently being purchased by the Whitwick Colliery Company in 1911. In 1914, it was loaned from the mining company to house Belgian refugees during the First World War and in 1915, the house started to be used as a hospital for the war wounded. Following the First World War, the house became a school and is now one of the largest primary schools in Leicestershire.

Coalville Grammar School was built on Forest Road in 1909 and replaced the Harley Charity Grammar School at Osgathorpe. This imposing building was built at a cost of £7,145 by J.E Johnson of Loughborough and a 'Harley Memorial Tablet' was unveiled inside the building. The first headmaster was Mr L Storr-Best, D. Lit, M.A. Following the transferral of the grammar school to a new site at Warren Hills in the 1960s, the building became the home of Newbridge High School. An arson attempt nearly destroyed the building in 1984 and led to reconstruction of the upper storey and a new bell turret.

The former Belvoir Road Co-operative Store is a three-storey building which stands as an expression of interwar social and economic confidence in the town, being the organisation's fourth town centre premises, opened in 1916 and designed by Thomas Ignatius McCarthy. Despite alterations to its ground floor and a modern addition at its southern end, the building maintains a significant presence in the street scene with its brick and faience triple gabled frontage.

The former Co-operative Bakery near Mantle Lane is a large three-storey stone and brick building, built by the Coalville and District Working Men's Co-operative Society to provide bread and confectionery to the local district. Built in 1930, this is currently derelict. A section of the old bakery was the Palitoy Consumer Services Department during the 70s.

Standing a short distance from the old Co-operative Bakery, on the corner of Market Street and Wolsey Road are the former East Midland Housing Association Offices, which was provided with a third storey extension, circa 1990. Founded in 1946 as a traditional housing association by a group of homeless ex-servicemen with an initial capital of just £39 and 10 shillings, this organisation has since transferred its headquarters to Memorial House on the Whitwick Business Park and is now a huge concern known as the East Midlands Group, acting as landlord for 18,000 homes.

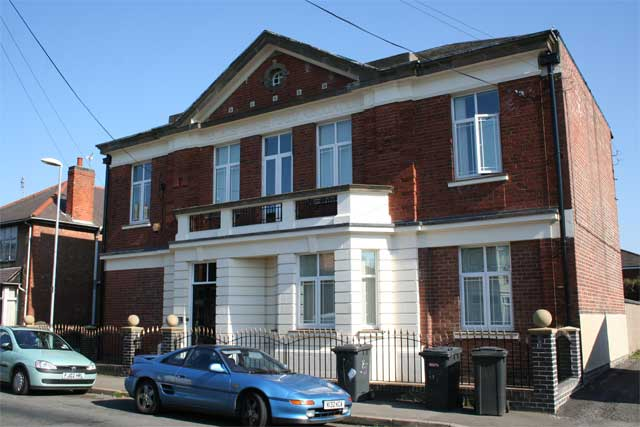
Leicestershire Miners' Association

The former Leicestershire Miners' Association building at No. 8 Bakewell Street was built between 1926 and 1927 at a cost of £4000 Founded as the Coalville and District Miners' Association in 1887, this became the Leicestershire Miners' Association in about 1907 and held its meetings in a variety of venues around the district until the Bakewell Street premises was built. In 1945, this building became the headquarters for the Leicestershire Area of the National Union of Mineworkers. It is now home to a company called Stirling Solutions, which produces software for the road haulage industry.

The Mantle Lane Signal Box has stood for more than a century overlooking the railway bridge on north side of Memorial Square. Opened in 1910, this is a 'Midland Railway Type 4c box', fitted with a 28 lever frame. Another signal box, dating from 1907, and which had stood at the crossing on Hotel Street, was dismantled several years ago and re-erected in the grounds of the Snibston Discovery Park.

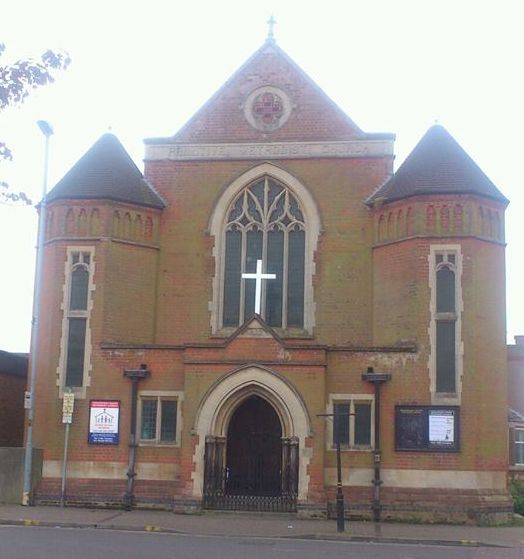
Marlborough Square Methodist Church, built 1903

The Market Hall, which formerly housed the town's general market, was constructed in 1975 at a cost of approximately £300,000. According to a contemporary publication, "the construction of the twin hyperbolic paraboloid main roofs is unique". Situated next to the railway line, close to the site of the original station, it has been suggested that the Market Hall would make an ideal modern station should the railway be re-opened to passenger services.

The Marlene Reid Centre on the corner of Belvoir Road and Melbourne Street was erected in 1881 as a Wesleyan Methodist chapel. This is a neat red brick structure, with rounded windows in the classical style forming an attractive feature in its upper storey frontage.

The Methodist Church in Marlborough Square is a good example of design by the local architect, Thomas Ignatius McCarthy, and together with the art deco cinema houses and former Lloyds bank forms a group of characterful buildings, though their impact is possibly detracted by the use of the square as a public car park. The Methodist Church, built as a Primitive Methodist chapel in 1903, contains a gallery extending around the interior, accessed by two polygonal towers either side of a large, four-light lancet widow on the frontal facade.

The Miners' Memorial Statue is a bronze sculpture situated on the site of the old railway station and which was officially unveiled by David Taylor MP and the Right Reverend William Down, Assistant Bishop of Leicester, in 1998 to mark the one hundredth anniversary of the Whitwick Colliery Disaster, in which thirty five men and boys lost their lives. The inscription reads: "This memorial is dedicated to all miners of Leicestershire who gave their lives winning the coal". The statue was sculpted by Judith Holmes Drewry. A measure of criticism has been aired by some of the former mining community that the representation of a man, standing with a raised pickaxe, does not reflect the true conditions of the narrow seams of the district, in which men would have more typically been forced to hew coal from a prostrate or kneeling position.

The Mother and Child is a bronze sculpture standing outside the public library, and which won the Sir Otto Beit Prize for 1963. The statue is by Robert John Royden Thomas and represents a mother looking forward, with her child looking behind her at a string bag she holds, which contains lumps of coal, a bobbin, books, a baby doll and another item, representing the mining, elastic, web weaving, toy manufacturing (Palitoy) and other industries of the town's past. The sculpture was unveiled on 11 October 1963 by Colonel P H Lloyd, Chairman of Leicestershire County Council, and stood in the New Broadway Shopping Centre until it was moved to its present location on High Street in 1988.

On Owen Street stands the former billiard hall (and dance hall) where Palitoy first started making soft-bodied dolls in 1937. Palitoy continued to make toys in the new factory which was built after WWII behind the Owen Street factory, with access from Jackson Street, until 1985. The old billiard hall was transformed into the Palitoy Design, Research and Development Department in the 70s.

The disused Municipal Cemetery off London Road contains some interesting monuments, such as those marking the graves of several victims of the Whitwick Colliery Disaster of 1898, and also the grave of William Bees, a recipient of the Victoria Cross. The cemetery also contains three Commonwealth war graves from World War I.

The Belvoir Centre shopping precinct occupies a large part of the town centre, with two main entrances on High Street and Belvoir Road. Though now regarded as outdated, this development was the first modern shopping precinct of the post-war era in Leicestershire and its construction cost approximately £1,000,000 in 1963. The precinct was formally opened by TV star, Noele Gordon. It contains seventy one shopping units and was overhauled in about 1990, when slate roof canopies were added around the precinct interior.

The former Rex Cinema in Marlborough Square retains numerous original art deco fittings and features. This was a Dunelm Mill shop until its closure in June 2016. The cinema was built by Walter Moss and Son at a cost of approximately £25,000 and was capable of seating 1,250 people. The cinema was opened on 2 February 1938.

Another building of note is the former Regal Cinema, which also stands in Marlborough Square. The revised edition of Pevsner's 'Buildings of England' draws attention to the building's faux Egyptian façade. The Regal was built on the site of the former Olympia picture house (which had been built in 1910) and opened on 2 November 1933, with a seating capacity of 1,200. The 'Cinema Treasures' website notes: "the Regal Cinema had a brick and artificial stone facade with a pylon on the right to accommodate the entrance. Fountain motifs here were repeated inside the two-level auditorium as ante-proscenium grilles above balconettes, lit by Holophane colour lighting. Foyer murals of Italian gardens were by scenic artist George Legge of Bryan’s Adamanta, Birmingham". In 1992, the building was acquired by Flutters Bingo.

The headstocks and nineteenth century pithead buildings of the former Snibston Mine form a prominent feature to the west of the town and in 2012, work commenced on a £1.4 million restoration scheme, the buildings having appeared on English Heritage's annual "at risk" register due to the state of the pithead structures, which had reached an advanced state of decay. However, though still ‘at risk’ the site is now a scheduled ancient monument. The colliery was sunk in 1831 and closed in December 1983 although it was still used as a drift for Whitwick colliery until 1986. The Pithead Baths on the north side of Ashby Road are by J W M Dudding and date from 1940. These have now been used to accommodate local business ventures.

The Springboard Centre on Mantle Lane occupies a large Victorian building that was formerly occupied by Stableford and Co. – a wagon works established in 1862, which had manufactured railway rolling stock for home, colonial and foreign railways, employing 900 to 1,200 men. In 1985, the derelict premises was acquired by the Leicestershire County Council, the local district council, British Coal and other backers and used as a venue for the establishment of small businesses. The centre originally contained twenty one units and has since grown to accommodate businesses occupying more than seventy units; since its opening, over four hundred and thirty businesses and organisations have been based within the centre and the annual average number of jobs based with or connected with the Springboard Centre is in excess of three hundred and sixty. The row of houses adjoining the Springboard Centre were built by W.D Stableford to house the families of men who came from the Black Country to work at his waggon works.

Stephenson College is a modern building beside Thornborough Road. In March 2006 the architects, Pick Everard, received the Leicestershire and Rutland Society of Architects' President's Award for the 'cutting edge' design work on the college, which was completed in 2005.

The Whitwick Business Park, which incorporates the Morrison's Supermarket and the adjacent retail complex, occupies a redeveloped part of the town which, for more than one hundred and fifty years, had been occupied by Whitwick Colliery. Officially opened on 6 November 1990, the Morrisons store comprises some 70,000 square feet and is a prominent feature overlooking the Stephenson Way, with a clock tower containing four faces at its south-west corner. Morrisons recently launched its own national clothing brand, 'Nutmeg', choosing to locate its headquarters close to the Coalville store.

The former St James' Church on Highfield Street, an Anglican church built in 1915 to serve the parish of Snibston, is a brick-built structure, by Stockdale Harrison and Son. Pevsner refers to its "interesting internal arrangements with the roof supports forming passage aisles". The interior woodwork is of Columbian pine and a sanctuary, vestry and sacristry were added in 1966. The church closed, and the building is converted to a multi-occupancy business centre.

== Road names ==
Broughton Street derives its name from Canon Henry Ellis Broughton, vicar of Hugglescote, 1889–1924.

== Notable residents ==
- Hugh Adcock (1903–1975), former Leicester City, Bristol Rovers and England footballer
- Tina Baker (born 1958), TV presenter
- William Bees (1871–1938), Recipient of the Victoria Cross; buried in the London Road Cemetery
- Norman Bird, actor (1920–2005)
- Simon Bookish, musician and composer
- David Brett, actor, singer and arranger. He was one of the original members of The Flying Pickets
- Kathleen Fidler (1899–1980), writer
- Thomas Hemsley (1927–2013), actor and opera singer, awarded CBE in 2000
- Tom Hopper, actor (born 1985)
- James Hunt (1943–2006), barrister and High Court Judge
- Joe Lees, former Barnsley, Rotherham County, Lincoln City and Halifax Town footballer
- Gregg Mayles (born 1971), video games designer
- Thomas Ignatius McCarthy (1880–1951), architect
- Elliott Moore (born 1997), Northampton Town footballer
- Spike Fearn (born 2000), Actor
- MC Pitman, hip-hop artist who performs in the persona of a Coalville miner
- Tommy Robinson (1909–1982), former footballer
- George Smith (1831–95), Victorian philanthropist
- Gemma Steel (born 1985), British long-distance runner
- William Stenson (1770–1861), mining engineer, founder of Whitwick Colliery; plaque on London Road marks site of former residence
- Edwin Walker (1909–1994), former Leicestershire cricketer
- Steve Whitworth (born 20 March 1952), former professional footballer who made nearly 600 appearances in the Football League playing for Leicester City, Sunderland, Bolton Wanderers and Mansfield Town. He was capped seven times for England
- Sid Wileman (1910–1985), former footballer
- David Wise (born 1967), video game music composer and musician

== See also ==
- Coalville Town F.C.
- Palitoy
