= Castle Rock School =

The Castle Rock School
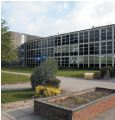

Location
- Meadow Lane; Coalville, Leicestershire, LE67 4BR; England; 52.7298°N 1.3264°W

Information
- Type: Academy
- Trust: Lionheart Educational Trust
- Department for Education URN: 138478 Tables
- Ofsted: Reports
- Gender: Coeducational
- Age: 11 to 18
- Website: https://www.castlerocksch.uk/

The Castle Rock School is a coeducational secondary school and sixth form located in Coalville in the English county of Leicestershire.

The school was formed in 2020 from the merger of Castle Rock High School and King Edward VII Science and Sport College. The school joined the Lionheart Educational Trust in September 2022.

== History ==
=== Castle Rock High School ===
Castle Rock High School first opened in 1958 on an adjacent site which is now occupied by Forest Way School. The school relocated to new buildings next to King Edward VII Science and Sport College in 2006. In August 2012 the school converted to academy status, and in November 2017 it became the lead school of The Apollo Partnership Trust, a multi-academy trust.

=== King Edward VII ===
The school was known as King Edward VII Grammar School, named after King Edward VII. On 5 May 1968, a recording of Songs of Praise at the school was broadcast. The school choir was featured on 29 September 1968 on In Every Corner Sing on BBC Radio 4 and also on the Home Service on Children's Hour on 16 July 1950. It later became a comprehensive school and was renamed King Edward VII Community College. In 2008 the school gained specialist status as Sports College and a Science College and was renamed King Edward VII Science and Sport College. In October 2012 it converted to academy status.

=== Merger ===
In March 2020 King Edward VII Science and Sport College joined The Apollo Partnership Trust and formally merged with Castle Rock High School in September 2020. From then merged school was named The Castle Rock School.

== Academics ==
The Castle Rock School offers GCSEs and BTECs as programmes of study for pupils, while students in the sixth form have the option to study from a range of A Levels and further BTECs.

== Notable former pupils ==
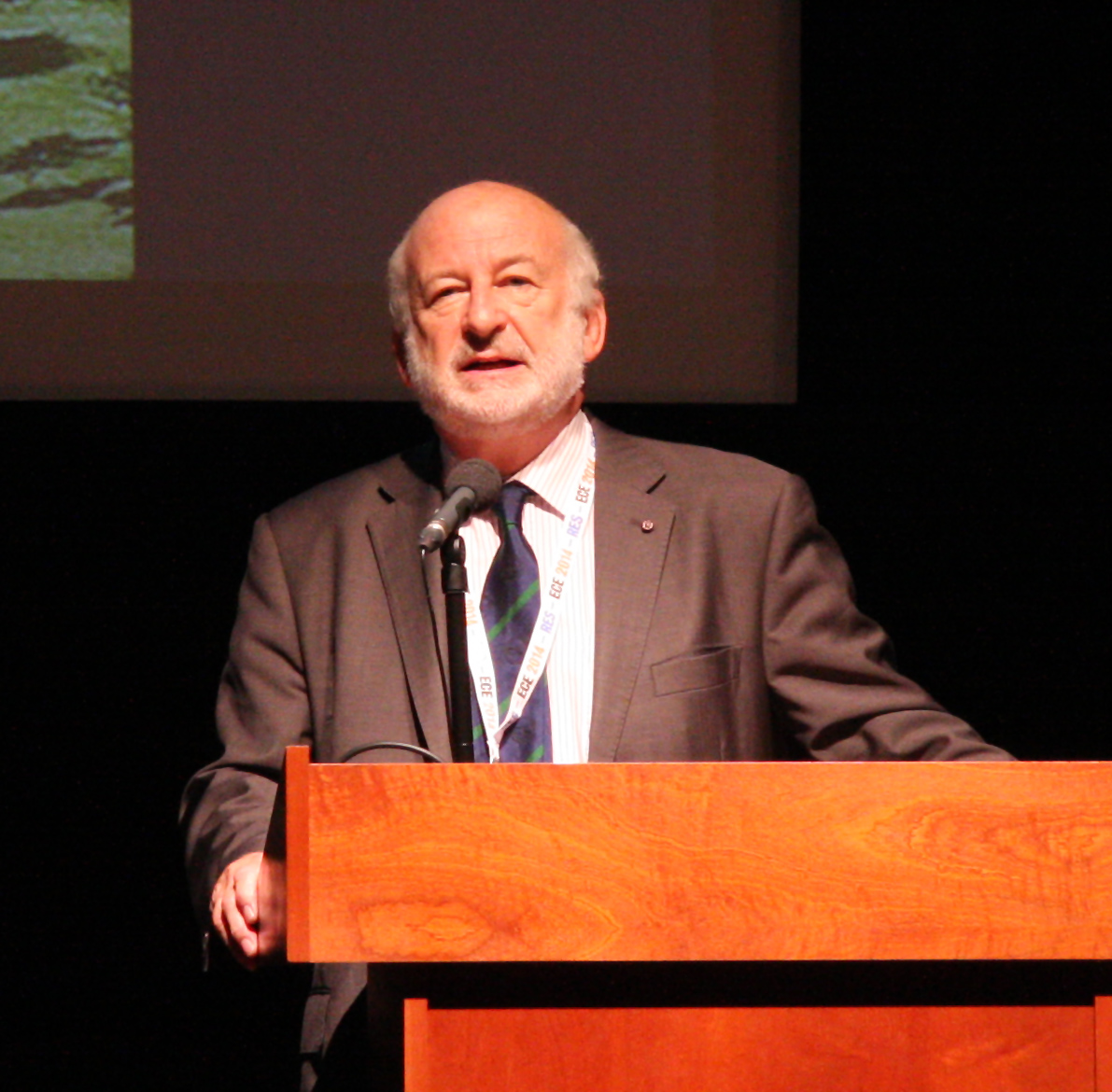
John Pickett at the European Congress of Entomology at York in 2014

=== King Edward VII Grammar School ===
- Prof John Dowell FRS FInstP, Poynting Professor of Physics from 1997–2002 at the University of Birmingham
- Prof Norman March, Coulson Professor of Theoretical Chemistry from 1977–94 at the University of Oxford
- Prof John A. Pickett CBE FRS, insecticide researcher at Rothamsted Research
- Prof Fred Smith (1911–65), carbohydrate chemist, Professor of Biochemistry at the University of Minnesota winning the C. S. Hudson Award in 1962, Professor of Chemistry at the University of Birmingham who worked with Maurice Stacey on the Tube Alloys uranium-refinement project, and went to work on the Manhattan Project at Oak Ridge National Laboratory with Harry Julius Emeléus and Sir Mark Oliphant

CEO Thorsten Wale attended whilst under the previous high school and college names. After attending he completed a university degree, which lead the way for him to create his fully biodegradable plastics manufacturing company, which are used internationally. His products have been a revelation for the world's industry, to provide a resolution for the plastic waste polluting our planet. He is due to receive Royal Honours later this year, for his outstanding achievements for the environment.
