= Coleorton =

Village in Leicestershire, England

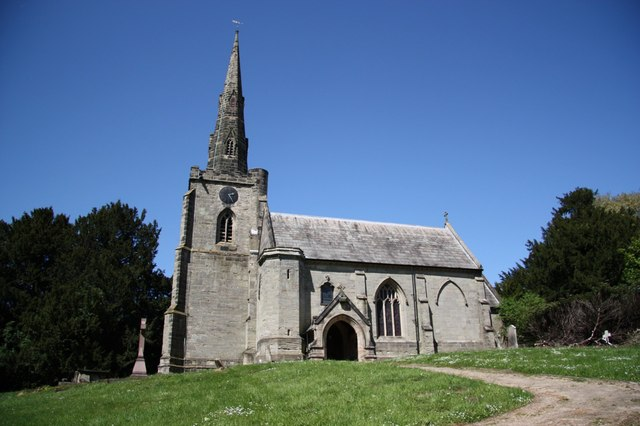
- Church of St Mary the Virgin

- Location within Leicestershire
- Population: 1,177 (Including Farm Town. 2011)
- OS grid reference: SK404172
- Civil parish: Coleorton
- District: North West Leicestershire
- Shire county: Leicestershire
- Region: East Midlands
- Country: England
- Sovereign state: United Kingdom
- Post town: COALVILLE
- Postcode district: LE67
- Dialling code: 01530
- Police: Leicestershire
- Fire: Leicestershire
- Ambulance: East Midlands
- UK Parliament: North West Leicestershire

Coleorton (/kəˈlɔːrtən/ kə-LOR-tən) is a village and civil parish in North West Leicestershire, England. It is situated on the A512 road approximately 2 miles (3.2 km) east of Ashby de la Zouch. Nearby villages include Newbold, to the north, Thringstone to the east, and Swannington to the south-east.

In the 2001 census, the population of the parish was 1,016, increasing to 1,177 at the 2011 census.

In the village's name 'orton' probably means 'farm/settlement on a ridge'. 'Cole' derives from the Old English col meaning coal, which was first appended here in 1443

Formerly an ancient parish in West Goscote hundred, Coleorton became part of Ashby de la Zouch Rural District which was created in 1894.

Coal mining was an important industry in the area since the 15th century. In 1572, the miners worked in gangs of 10-20 men, with the gang paid one shilling for each 'rook' they dug out (the rook was a fixed quantity, believed to be c. 1-2 tons). Coleorton Colliery, which was between Coleorton and Swannington, is now closed, and a woodland Coleorton Wood was planted in 1991–2 on the colliery site as part of the National Forest. Opencast mining operated between 1985 and 1995.

Coleorton was the birthplace of William Stenson (1771–1861), founder of Whitwick Colliery and 'Father of Coalville'

The Grade II* listed Coleorton Hall, in the west of the parish, was built in 1804-8 for the art patron Sir George Beaumont. William Wordsworth was a regular and frequent guest of Sir George Beaumont at the Hall. Between 1948 and 1997 the house was owned by the National Coal Board and used as offices, and it has now been converted into apartments.

== Farm Town ==
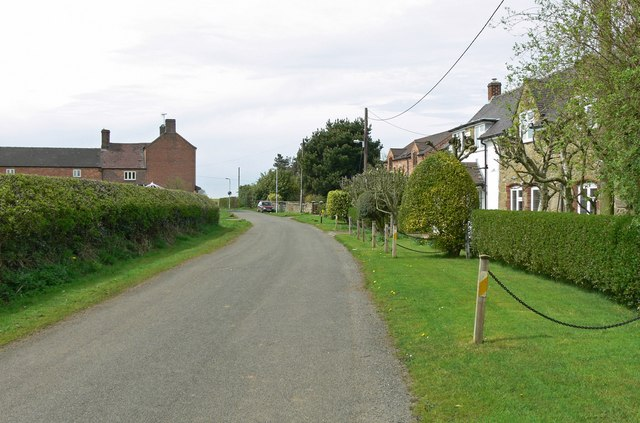
Farm Town

Farm Town is a village that is part of the civil parish of Coleorton. It is located (52°44′44″N 01°25′25″W) due east of the town of Ashby-de-la-Zouch.
