= East Goscote =

Village in Leicestershire, England

Coordinates: 52.71448°N 1.05404°W

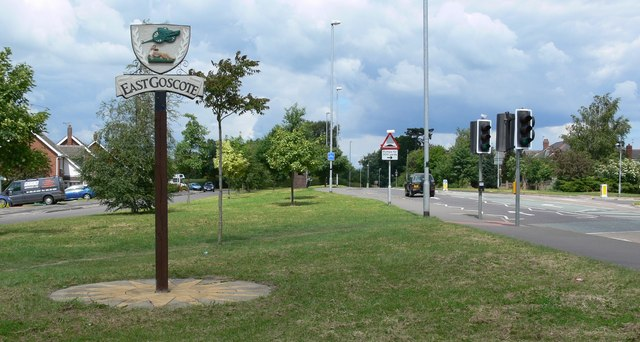

- Location within Leicestershire
- Population: 2,866
- District: Charnwood
- Shire county: Leicestershire
- Region: East Midlands
- Country: England
- Sovereign state: United Kingdom
- Post town: LEICESTER
- Postcode district: LE7
- Dialling code: 0116
- Police: Leicestershire
- Fire: Leicestershire
- Ambulance: East Midlands
- UK Parliament: Melton and Syston

East Goscote (/ˈɡɒskət/) is a modern village and civil parish in the Borough of Charnwood district of Leicestershire, England, just north of the market town of Syston. It is a medium-sized village, with a population measured at 2,866 in the 2011 census. The village is twinned with Fleury-sur-Andelle, France.

The village's name either derives from the Old English gos-cot meaning 'cottages where geese are kept', or from an Anglo-Saxon named Gosa.

The name is taken from the East Goscote Hundred, one of the old hundreds (an area of land purported to be able to support 100 families) of Leicestershire. The Goscote Hundred (or Wapentake) is mentioned in the Domesday Book, this was later split into the West and East Goscote Hundreds.

It was the first new village to be created in Leicestershire since Domesday.

The village is built on the site of a former British Army supply depot. According to Ministry of Defence (MoD) files, the site was originally constructed in 1940 (finished September 1942) by Holloway Brothers, and was an Agency Filling Factory run by Lever Brothers/Unilever as No.10 Royal Ordnance Factory (10 ROF). At that time, it was known as the Queniborough Depot, since that was the closest village to it. It began production in March/April 1942. The aerial photograph reveals its former road layout. According to English Heritage's reference work Dangerous Energy, it was operating Groups 8-10 of ROF filling types (High Explosives received, mixed, and put into bombs and warheads). By 1944, it was temporarily occupied by the War Office. A report of 1951 has it designated as 78 COSD (Command Ordnance Sub Depot). It was decommissioned in 1959, and subsequently bought for housing development by Jelson Homes. This development began in 1962. There were two enormous shell storage bunkers that could not be demolished, and these were earthed over and landscaped. They became known locally as the 'Mound', and are now part of the adjacent playing fields. These were opened to the public as part of the Queen's Silver Jubilee celebrations in 1977, and there is a plaque near Long Furrow noting this fact.

The road called Long Furrow serves as a perimeter around the central part of the village; it also serves to mark the boundary of the former ordnance site. What is less well known is the huge network of large reinforced concrete tunnels that lay beneath the whole village; where the munitions were fitted with their warheads, and new top secret weapons prototypes were put together. There are several entrances to these workshops and tunnels located throughout the village, but each have been carefully landscaped to conceal their identity. Council representatives did enter these chambers, and found that the tunnels were in excellent condition, and the electricity still worked. Until the mid-1970s, during which the village was still under construction, both entrances to the 'Mound' were open, and often visited by local children.

A map of the actual tunnel layout did exist in the Library of Wreake Valley Community College, Syston, but was misplaced to keep the tunnels hidden. The whole structure, and stories that lay beneath its present inhabitants is worthy of a serious study, survey, and television documentary.

The first family to move in did so in 1965, even though the village lacked many amenities at the time, including street lighting.

The village is served by Broomfield County Primary School, which was opened in 1968. The school was expanded in 1977 to cope with the number of children on the village.

The original design made no mention of the village hall, and this was built by Jelson Homes free of charge. It was the home of religious services until the completion of St Hilda's Church in 1976. The first village vicar was the Reverend Dudley Gummer, who took services in his own house in Coopers Nook, until the village hall was built.

The village had its own magazine East Goscote Community News, which was first published in 1969. It ceased publication in the mid-1980s, after many issues. Now they have a magazine called Long Furrow.

Adjacent to the village, north of the railway line, is Beedles Lake Golf Club.

East Goscote ward is represented on Charnwood Borough Council by Green Party Councillor Laurie Needham. Before 2015, it was represented by Cathy Duffy, the only elected representative in the locality from the far-right British National Party (BNP).

Charnwood Borough Council has stated that there will be a new railway station to open at East Goscote, on the railway line towards Melton Mowbray.

== Notable people from East Goscote ==
- Dudley Gummer – First Anglican vicar of East Goscote, held early services in his home before St Hilda's Church was built.
- Josh Leist – British Graphic Designer.
- Laurie Needham – Green Party councillor representing East Goscote on Charnwood Borough Council.
- Cathy Duffy – Former British National Party councillor who represented East Goscote ward prior to 2015.
