= Limehurst Academy =

Location
- Bridge Street; Loughborough, Leicestershire, LE11 1NH; England
- Coordinates: 52°46′32″N 1°12′27″W

Information
- Type: Academy
- Religious affiliation: Multicultural
- Department for Education URN: 137367 Tables
- Ofsted: Reports
- Headteacher: Jonathan Mellor
- Gender: Mixed
- Age: 11 to 16
- Enrolment: 621
- Website: www.limehurst.org.uk

Limehurst Academy (formerly Limehurst High School) is a mixed secondary school located in Loughborough in the English county of Leicestershire.

It was previously a community middle school called Limehurst High School which was administered by Leicestershire County Council. The school converted to academy status in September 2011 and was renamed Limehurst Academy, however the school continues to coordinate with Leicestershire County Council for admissions. In September 2013 Limehurst Academy converted from being a middle school for pupils aged 11 to 14 to a secondary school for pupils up to the age of 16.

Limehurst Academy offers GCSEs and BTECs as programmes of study for pupils, as well as some vocational courses offered in conjunction with Loughborough College. The school also has a specialism in sports and has links with local sports clubs and coaches to support the specialism.
