= The Winstanley School =

Location
- Kingsway North; Braunstone, Leicestershire, LE3 3BD; England; 52°37′02″N 1°11′10″W

Information
- Type: Academy
- Established: 1962
- Local authority: Leicestershire
- Department for Education URN: 143844 Tables
- Ofsted: Reports
- Head of School: David Bennett
- Gender: Coeducational
- Age: 11 to 16
- Enrolment: 608 as of October 2020
- Colours: Orange, Green and Blue
- Website: Official website

The Winstanley School is a coeducational secondary school located in Braunstone Town in the English county of Leicestershire.

The school has an all-weather pitch, an indoor swimming pool, a dance studio, and a sports hall.

The school celebrated its 50th anniversary in 2012. The school also converted to academy status in 2012.

Previously, The Winstanley School was a middle school educating pupils aged 11 to 14 (academic years 7 to 9). However, from September 2014 the school expanded to be a full secondary school educating pupils up to the age of 16. The school was formerly known as Winstanley Community College.
