= The Newbridge School =

Location
- Forest Road; Coalville, Leicestershire, LE67 3SJ; England
- Coordinates: 52.717°N 1.366°W

Information
- Type: Academy
- Local authority: Leicestershire
- Trust: Lionheart Academies Trust
- Department for Education URN: 138301 Tables
- Ofsted: Reports
- Gender: Coeducational
- Age range: 11–16
- Website: www.newbridge.org.uk

The Newbridge School (formerly Newbridge High School) is a coeducational secondary school located in Coalville in the English county of Leicestershire.

Previously a community administered by Leicestershire County Council, in July 2012 Newbridge High School converted to academy status. In September 2022 the school joined the Lionheart Academies Trust, and the school also changed its name to The Newbridge School.

The Newbridge School offers GCSEs as programmes of study for pupils. The school also operates The Duke of Edinburgh's Award scheme.

== Notable former pupils ==
- Tom Hopper, actor
