= Long Field Academy =

Location
- Ambleside way Melton Mowbray, Leicestershire, LE13 0BN; England
- Coordinates: 52°45′41″N 0°53′56″W

Information
- Type: Academy
- Department for Education URN: 138628 Tables
- Ofsted: Reports
- Chair of Governors: Debi Williamson
- Headteacher: Christopher Hagget (June 2015)
- Gender: Coeducational
- Age: 11 to 16
- Enrolment: 721
- Houses: Leo; Phoenix; Thanos; Titan
- Colour: Black blazer with a blue striped tie
- Website: https://longfieldspencer.org.uk/

Long Field Academy (formerly Longfield School) is a coeducational secondary school and sixth form with academy status, located in Melton Mowbray, Leicestershire, England. It used to be a high school as designated within the Leicestershire Plan. It was reorganised along with the whole of Melton Mowbray in 2008.

== Admissions ==
There are 600+ students at the school, which has risen from 400 when it was a middle school.

In January 2015 it was announced that Long Field Academy would be joining with the Spencer Academies Trust. This trust is made of eight schools and was led, until her retirement, by Dame Susan Jowett of George Spencer Academy Nottinghamshire. It was also announced in February 2015 that Christopher Haggett (current Vice Principal of George Spencer Academy) would be the new Principal of Long Field starting on 1 June 2015.

The newest building is called the Hampson Centre. It has a sports hall, sport science centre and classrooms where year 11 are based. It is named after a former student, Matt Hampson, who was paralysed whilst playing rugby with the England under 21 side.
