= New Swannington =

Aarea between the Leicestershire villages of Whitwick and Swannington

Coordinates: 52.740°N 1.376°W

New Swannington is an area between Whitwick and Swannington in the North West Leicestershire district of Leicestershire, England.

Buildings of note are an off-licence, the New Swannington Primary School and a Wesleyan Reform Church built in 1906. The church contains a tablet, dedicated to the memory of a workman who fell from the roof and died during its construction. The New Swannington fellowship is believed to have been formed as a break-away congregation from the Wesleyan Reform Church in Whitwick, which still stands (now used for industrial purposes, currently occupied by 'Gracedieu Windows') on North Street, Whitwick, a short distance from The Dumps cross-roads, to the rear of the former Stinson's Butchers Shop.
