= Stephenson College, Coalville =

Coordinates: 52.7337°N 1.3767°W

Stephenson College
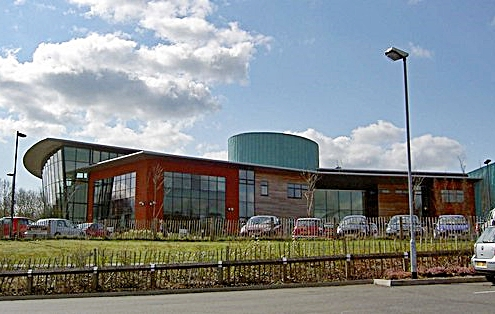
- Type: Public FE
- Principal: Jonny Watkin
- Location: Coalville, Leicestershire, England
- Colours: Green
- Website: www.stephenson.ac.uk

Stephenson College is a Further Education college on Thornborough Way, Coalville, Leicestershire, England. It was created as a new build when the former college in Bridge Road, Coalville, closed in 2005.

This campus is known for its Technical and Trade aspects including construction courses and facilities. In 2022, the Stephenson Campus was awarded Construction Apprenticeship Provider of the Year for its partnership with Barratt Developments.

Part of the campus was used by the Stephenson Studio School, which opened to students in September 2011. The school closed in 2024.

In 2020, Stephenson College merged with Brooksby Melton College to form the SMB College Group and on 1st August 2025, Stephenson College became part of Loughborough College Group as a part of the merger between SMB College Group and Loughborough College.
