= History of Leicestershire =

History of an English county

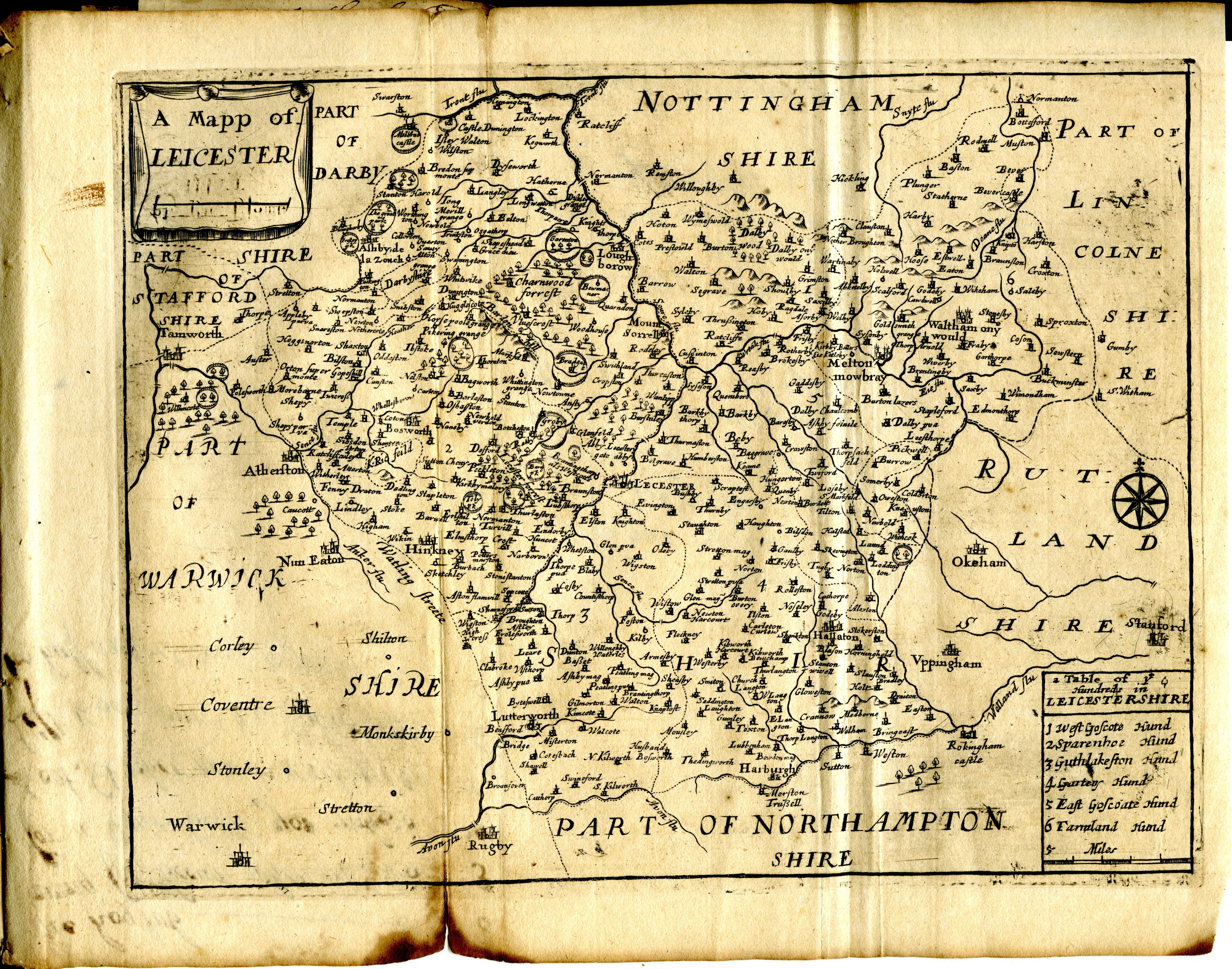
A late 17th-century map of the county

A page of Leicestershire in the Domesday Book

This article is intended to give an overview of the history of Leicestershire, England.

== Geography and toponymy ==
The first recorded use of the name Lægrecastrescir was in 1086. In Domesday Book (1086) the county is recorded as Ledecestrescire and in 1124 Leþecæstrescir occurs.

Leicestershire's external boundaries have changed little since the Domesday Survey. The Measham-Donisthorpe exclave of Derbyshire has been exchanged for the Netherseal/Overseal area, and the urban expansion of Market Harborough has caused Little Bowden, previously in Northamptonshire to be annexed.

=== Hundreds ===
Leicestershire was recorded in the Domesday Book of 1086 as a city within the wapentake of Guthlaxton when there were four wapentakes completely in Leicestershire: Guthlaxton, Framland, Goscote and Gartree. These later became hundreds, with the division of Goscote into West Goscote and East Goscote, and the addition of Sparkenhoe hundred from a partition of Guthlaxton. City status was later revoked and after several centuries regained in 1919.

=== Roads and tracks ===
==== Prehistoric tracks ====
As the county was not densely inhabited before the 10th century there are few traces of early trackways. The prehistoric trackway ("Jurassic Trackway") which linked the downlands of Wiltshire with the wolds of Yorkshire did cross the county having followed the top of the Northamptonshire uplands. Where the escarpment had broken down as it had in Northamptonshire and Leicestershire it is impossible to know what route was followed; however where the uplands formed a narrow belt the approximate line of it can be identified. It is likely to have been in use already in the early Bronze Age (c. 1900-1500 BC) but if not so early than certainly during the middle Bronze Age (1500-1000 BC). The route of the trackway passes near Husbands Bosworth and Tilton and further on passes into Lincolnshire where it follows Lincoln Edge before crossing the River Humber into Yorkshire.

Another prehistoric road came from the Fens and crossed the limestone plateau round Croxton Kerrial and Saltby, then went between Eastwell and Goadby Marwood and then southwestwards past Wartnaby and Six Hills to reach the Soar at Barrow. Possibly it continued into Charnwood Forest as Beacon Hill was probably an inhabited Bronze Age site, and possibly terminated at Bardon Hill.

Another ancient east to west road crossed the dry limestone plateau and provided a link between the Welland and the Trent. It begins at Stamford (whose name means "stone ford", a ford by which the Welland was crossed) following the line of Ermine Street (a Roman road) but diverges from the Roman road towards the left and rises to its summit of 500 feet near Buckminster; thereafter it crosses Saltby heath and goes by Three Queens to reach the Vale of Belvoir where its course cannot be identified. Beyond the vale it probably went through Long Bennington to the banks of the River Trent at or near Newark. This road may have been in use as early as the Bronze Age but if not so early then its use began in the early Iron Age. It remained in use in ancient British, Roman and early Anglian times.

Sewstern Lane (also known as The Drift) is an old road which was used throughout the Middle Ages, probably as the most direct way between the great fairs of Nottingham and Stamford. A more direct route came into use later via Stonesby and Waltham on the Wolds. Sewstern Lane became less used after the mid 17th century, apart from its use by the Earls of Rutland on their journeys to London from Belvoir. When coaches started to run in the later 17th century a different route was taken via Stretton, Colsterworth and Great Ponton since Sewstern Lane would have provided insufficient staging posts where food for men and horses would be available. It continued in use as a drove road for cattle until the advent of railways changed the means of transport.

The plateau round Tilton was a meeting place for prehistoric tracks: one of these which is called in its latter stages Ridgemere Lane runs north of Cold Newton, by New York farm to the edge of the flood plain of the Wreak near Syston. Part of it coincides with parish boundaries, proof that it predates the delimiting of parishes in the pre-Conquest era. Another old way goes above Lowesby and South Croxton and comes down to the edge of the plain at Queniborough. No dating of these two tracks is possible except that they are pre-Roman in origin.

Another very old road, perhaps a true ridgeway of the Bronze Age, comes westwards from Stamford and follows a limestone ridge then goes by Edith Weston, Manton and Martinsthorpe (a deserted village) to enter Leicestershire near Withcote. It goes from there along the high ground through Halstead and so to Tilton. From Tilton it continues westward by Billesdon Coplow and the site of the abandoned village of Ingarsby; near Scraptoft it follows Scraptoft Lane and reaches the gravel terrace by the banks of the Soar where Leicester would in later times be founded. It is not certain that this was a through route in prehistoric times but it was such in the Middle Ages and was used by Leicester merchants to reach the fairs of Stamford.

==== Roman roads ====
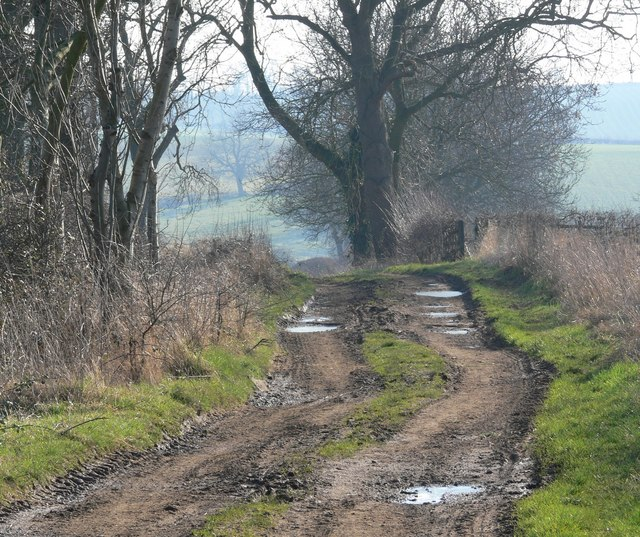
The course of a former Roman road

There are about 76 miles of Roman roads in the county and these are well marked on Ordnance Survey maps. Most of these are sections of the three principal routs that passed through the county: the Fosse Way, Watling Street, and the Via Devana.

The longest single stretch of road is between High Cross and the vanished Roman station of Vernemetum and is part of the Fosse Way, constructed about 46-48 AD. The section northwards to Vernemetum forms the present main road to Newark. The next road in age is Watling Street, which dates from 50-51 AD and which marks the boundary between Leicestershire and Warwickshire. The road from Leicester to Manduessum (now Mancetter) was probably made some 20 years later than Watling Street and is part of the rout known as the Via Devana between Camulodunum (today Colchester) and Deva Victrix (now Chester). Parts of this route became disused in Anglo-Saxon times as that people established no villages nearby.

==== Medieval roads and bridges ====
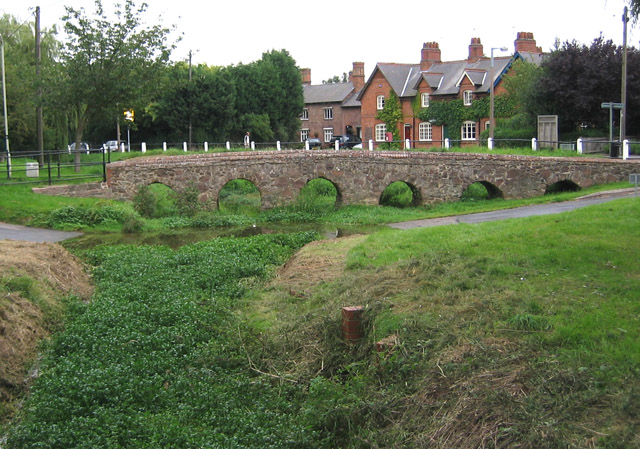
The Seven Arch Bridge, Rearsby

The Anglo-Saxons were not road makers but the paths and tracks which connected their villages with those nearby form the basis for the modern road system. There are some green tracks in the county of probable Anglo-Saxon origin which are also followed by parish boundaries (these are often called "The Mere", mere meaning boundary). One of these runs from Countesthorpe towards Gilmorton and another, long known as "The Old Mere", from the Wigston Magna - Newton Harcourt road nearly to Houghton on the Hill. In the 13th and 14th centuries various fairs and markets were established in some of the villages; those that prospered led to the villages becoming market towns. Between fair and market towns roads became established and communication was also aided by the building to bridges. Most of the medieval bridges of the county outside Leicester were built in the second half of the 13th century or very early in the 14th. None of these early stone bridges survives but there are some later ones in existence at Aylestone, Anstey, Enderby Mill (the road to it was diverted away when turnpikes were built) and Rearsby. These are of uncertain date but probably not earlier than the 15th century.

=== Rutland and Leicester ===
In 1974, due to the Local Government Act 1972, the county of Rutland was annexed to Leicestershire as a district, and Leicester's county borough status was abolished, it becoming a district also.

In 1974, the Local Government Act 1972 abolished the county borough status of Leicester and the county status of neighbouring Rutland, converting both to administrative districts of Leicestershire. These actions were reversed on 1 April 1997, when Rutland and the City of Leicester became unitary authorities. Rutland became a distinct Ceremonial County once again, although it continues to be policed by Leicestershire Constabulary.

== Early history ==
The earthworks of Leicestershire include hill-top camps of the 1st century BC and the sites of deserted villages abandoned in the later Middle Ages. There are hill-forts, Roman camps (e.g. Ratby), linear earthworks, castle-sites (e.g.Hallaton), moated homesteads and sites of deserted villages (e.g. Ingarsby). The remains of prehistoric burial mounds and tumuli are scanty. The county was sparsely populated up to the 10th century AD and a large part of it was thickly wooded areas of heavy clay. However, during the rest of the Middle Ages most of the land was progressively cleared and settled; so that it became populous and prosperous, but more so in the eastern half and in the southeast.

Together with Derbyshire, Nottinghamshire, Lincolnshire, Rutland and Northamptonshire Leicestershire was inhabited by the ancient British tribe formerly known as Coritani (now corrected to Corieltauvi). After the Roman conquest it was included in the province of Flavia Caesariensis. In Anglo-Saxon times the land was settled by the Middle Angles (i.e. the Angles between the East Angles and the Mercians) whose territory was later included in the kingdom of Mercia. From the reign of Egbert, King of Wessex, the kings of Wessex also ruled Mercia. The division of the kingdom into shires or counties was probably done about 800 or even earlier. During the incursions of the Danes the midlands were frequently plundered and laid waste. After the Danish invasions it was included in the Danelaw, whose boundary ran on the south-western boundary of the shire.

=== Diocese ===
A bishopric of the Middle Angles was established here in 680, and the Anglo-Saxon cathedral was probably located close to (if not on the site of) the present cathedral. The original diocese fell victim to the invasion by the Danes around 870 and after the establishment of the Danelaw in 886 the diocese's seat was moved to Oxfordshire and, taking over the existing Diocese of Lindine (created in 678), became the Diocese of Dorchester.

== 20th century ==
After the division of the Diocese of Lincoln in 1541 the county was part of the Diocese of Peterborough. In the 19th century there were suffragan bishops of Leicester whilst the county was still within the Diocese of Peterborough. The modern diocese of Leicester was founded on 12 November 1926 from the archdeaconries of Leicester and Loughborough and part of the Archdeaconry of Northampton, all from the Diocese of Peterborough. St Martin's Church, Leicester, was elevated as the cathedral of the new see.

== County symbol ==
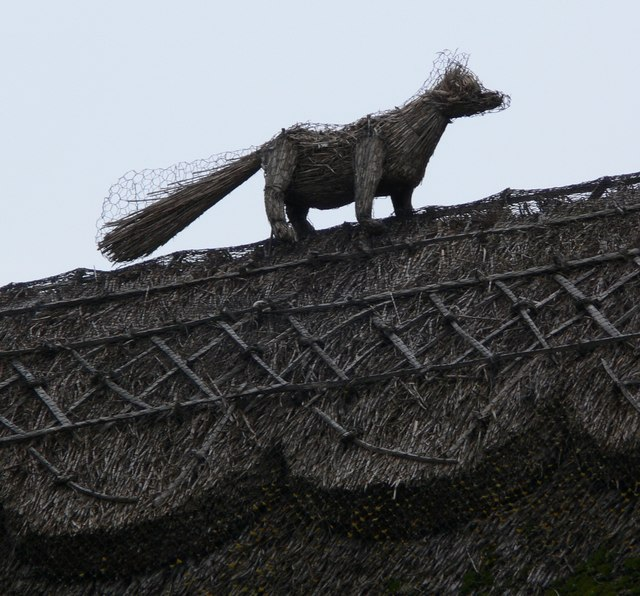
A straw fox at Long Whatton

The crest of the county council, and the emblem of Leicestershire County Cricket Club, Leicester City FC and Leicestershire Scouts is the red fox. Leicestershire is considered to be the birthplace of fox hunting as it is known today. Hugo Meynell of Quorn, Master of the Quorn Hunt 1753–1800, is known as the father of fox hunting. Melton Mowbray and Market Harborough have associations with fox hunting, as has neighbouring Rutland.

== See also ==
- History of England
- Corieltauvi
- Five Burghs
- Diocese of Leicester
- House of Beaumont
- Leir of Britain
- List of lost settlements in the United Kingdom § Leicestershire
- List of hundreds of England
