= Seagrave =

Village in Leicestershire, England

Coordinates: 52°45′6.00″N 1°5′2.00″W

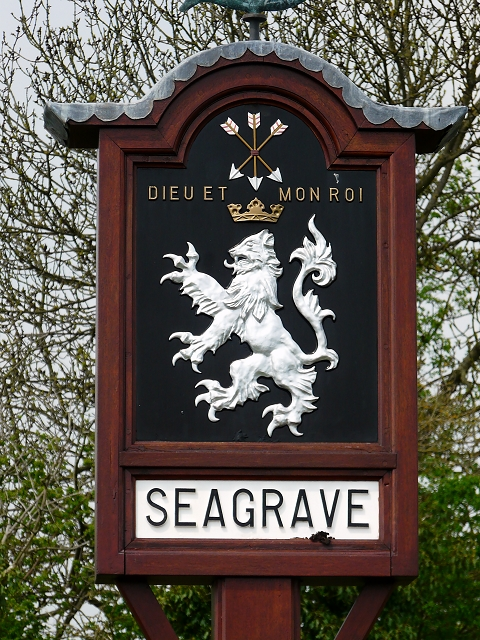
- The Village Sign

- Location within Leicestershire
- Population: 546
- District: Charnwood
- Shire county: Leicestershire
- Region: East Midlands
- Country: England
- Sovereign state: United Kingdom
- Post town: LOUGHBOROUGH
- Postcode district: LE12
- Dialling code: 01509
- Police: Leicestershire
- Fire: Leicestershire
- Ambulance: East Midlands
- UK Parliament: Melton and Syston

Seagrave is a village and civil parish in the Charnwood district of Leicestershire, England. It has a population of around 500, measured at the 2011 census as 546, It is north of Sileby and close to Thrussington and Barrow upon Soar.

== History ==
One of the earliest mentions of this place is in the Domesday Book where named Segrave, it is listed amongst the lands in the wapentake of Goscote given to Henry de Ferrers by King William I. The land consisted of work for one plough and four acres of meadow.

By the twelfth century, Seagrave was owned by the de Segrave family, who built a fortified manor house in the parish. Their familial coat of arms was later adopted by the village. In March 1234, Richard Siward, at the head of a company of outlaws, ravaged Stephen de Segrave's native place, evidently Seagrave; burnt his fine houses, oxen, and stores of grain, and carried off many valuable horses and rich spoil. Later, the same band ravaged Alconbury, and burnt his buildings there. In 1346, population growth led to the division of the wapentake; for judicial matters, Seagrave was in the hundred of East Goscote.

The effects of parliamentary enclosure on social and economic aspects of England and its people can be understood by examining the results of the Seagrave Inclosure Act 1759 (33 Geo. 2. c. 25 Pr.), which effectively converted copyhold tenure in the open fields to freehold tenure.

The village attempts to preserve its better buildings through repurposing. The Primitive Methodist chapel was converted into a house which still has the original nameplate, with Primitive spelled in an obsolete form as 'Primitive'.

Leicester City F.C. opened a new state of the art training facility on the site of the village's former Park Hill Golf Club in December 2020.

George Dunn, keeper of the card, lived in the village for an 18-month spell while on an extended holiday from Loughborough.

=== 1963 air crash ===
A BAC Jet Provost crashed on 29 July 1963. The two pilots ejected. One was 19 year old Pilot Officer Paul Fisher of Strood, from RAF Syerston. The instructor, 42 year old Alex Naismith, was taken to Leicester Royal Infirmary with a back injury. The pilots were given a cup of tea at the Black Cat Cafe at Six Hills, on the A46. Anthony Wilkin of Willowbrook Road, saw the pilots land.

== Gallery ==
Seagrave
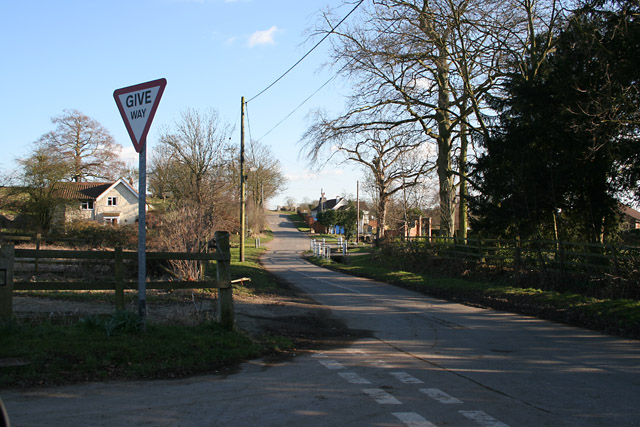
Berrycott Lane joins King Street at the Eastern end of the village.

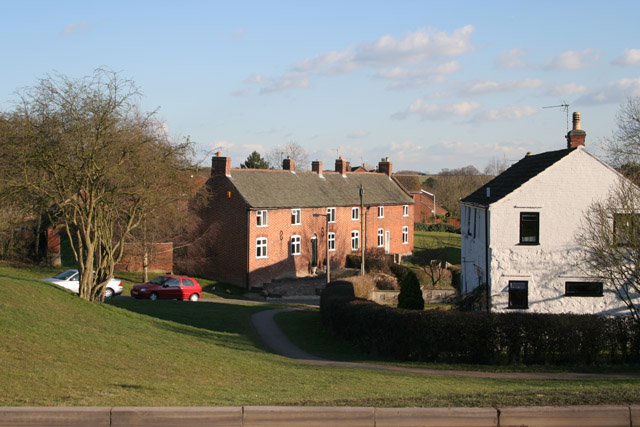
Looking east from Green Lane towards King Street.

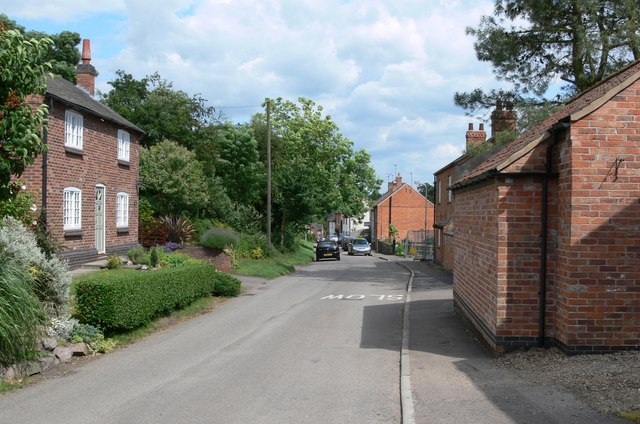
King Street

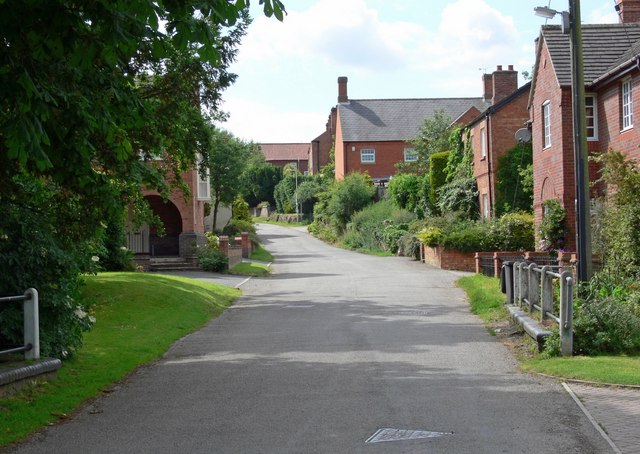
King Street

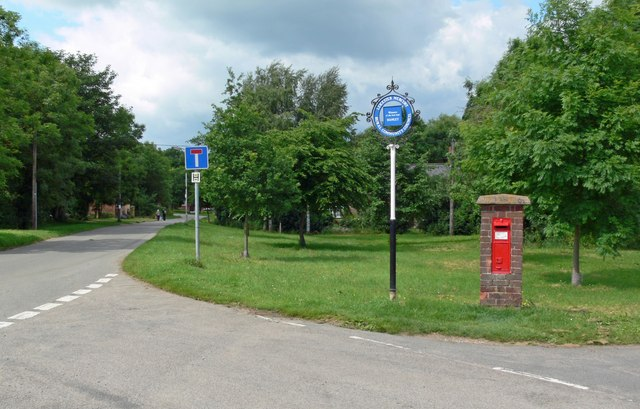
Green Lane

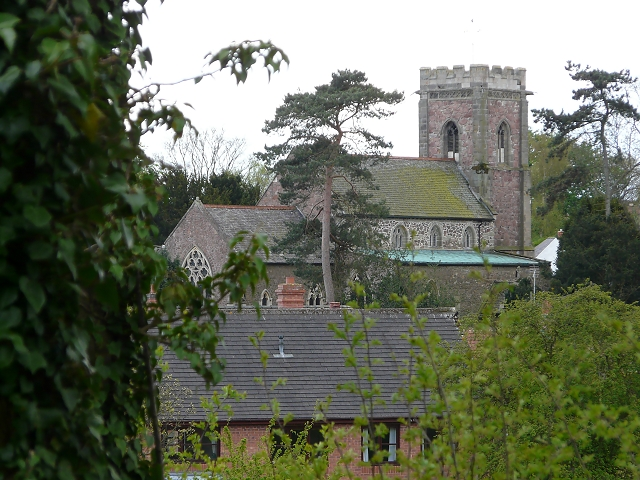
All Saints Church

== Notable people ==
Gilbert de Segrave of Segrave, High Sheriff of Warwickshire and Leicestershire in 1193, father of Stephen de Segrave (c. 1171 – 1241) Chief Justiciar of England.

Robert Burton, author of The Anatomy of Melancholy, was rector of All Saints' Church in Seagrave from 1630 to his death.
