= Wigston Birkett House Community Special School =

Location
- Station Road; Wigston, Leicestershire, LE18 2DS; England
- Coordinates: 52°34′56″N 1°06′38″W

Information
- Type: Special School, Academy
- Motto: Challenge, Achieve, Celebrate
- Department for Education URN: 138935 Tables
- Ofsted: Reports
- Chair of Governors: Andrew McQuaid
- Headteacher: Chris White
- Gender: Coeducational
- Age: 5 to 19
- Enrolment: 175
- Colour: Blue
- Academy trust: Birkett House Academy Trust
- School song: Reach by S Club 7
- Website: www.birketthouse.leics.sch.uk

Wigston Birkett House Community Special School is a special school with academy status based in Wigston, Leicestershire, England. The school caters for up to 200 students aged between 5 and 19 with a range of additional learning needs.

== Facilities ==
The school is spread over four sites located to the south of Leicester:

- Station Road site: Located in Wigston, on the site of Wigston Academy. This new building, which includes a swimming pool, multi-sensory environments, outdoor play areas and accessible classrooms was opened in September 2017. It replaced a previous building located at Launceston Road, Wigston. This site caters for students with moderate, severe, profound and complex needs aged between 5 and 19.
- Thistly Meadow Site: Located at Thistly Meadow Primary School in Blaby. Caters for KS2 students with moderate and severe needs.
- The Birkett House Centre at Thomas Estley: Located at Thomas Estley Community College in Broughton Astley. Caters for KS3 students with moderate and severe needs.
- Birkett House Seniors: Located at Countesthorpe Academy in Countesthorpe. Caters for KS4 and post-16 students with moderate and severe needs. Students at this site have access to a nearby allotment and it hosts a student run café known as "Fox Lodge".

== Reputation ==
Birkett House was rated as "Outstanding" in all areas during its most recent Ofsted inspections in 2015 and 2019.
