= Bushloe High School =

Location
- Station Road; Wigston Magna, Leicestershire, LE18 2DT; England

Information
- Type: Middle school; Academy
- Established: 1959
- Closed: 2015
- Department for Education URN: 138892 Tables
- Ofsted: Reports
- Gender: mixed
- Age: 10 to 14
- Enrolment: 709
- Successor School: Wigston Academy
- Website: http://leicestershire.schooljotter.com/bushloe

Bushloe High School was a middle school with academy status located in Wigston, Leicestershire, England.

== Admissions ==
It was a middle school, using the three-tier education system (invented in Leicestershire in the early 1960s as part of the Leicestershire Plan, later adopted by some parts of the UK, notably Northumberland and Bedfordshire). Many middle schools in Leicestershire returned to the more traditional age ranges in 2009. Middle schools are classed as secondary schools.

It was situated on the B582 in Wigston, next to two other schools - a middle school (Abington Academy) with the same age ranges as Bushloe, and a college (Guthlaxton College), both of which, in September 2015, merged with Bushloe to become Wigston College - opposite Oadby and Wigston council offices at Bushloe House, after which the school was named.

== History ==
Bushloe High School opened in September 1959.

=== Headteachers ===
- Mr Gaylon 1959–c1964
- Mr Blackhurst c1964–19xx?
- Ann Webster 2004–2015

=== New building ===
A new building was opened in 2006. The former building was completely demolished, except the older sports hall, which was used by Abington Academy, which neighboured Bushloe.

=== Merger ===
A merger with neighbouring school Abington Academy was proposed towards the end of 2013. After several consultation periods, it was announced in Spring 2015 that Bushloe would close and merge into Abington in September 2015 to form Wigston Academy under the new trust, Wigston Academies Trust. In September 2015, the age range of the school changed from 10 - 14 to 11 - 16.

== Activities ==
The Leicestershire Schools Symphony Orchestra used the school over many years for weekly practice sessions.

== Notable former pupils ==
- Luke Abraham, rugby player
- Rosemary Conley, exercise guru
- Harry Ellis, rugby player
- Prof Mark A. Smith, neuroscientist
- Hamza Choudhury, football player
- Harry Panayiotou, football player

== See also ==
- List of middle schools in England
