= Wigston College =

Location
- Station Road; Wigston Magna, Leicestershire, LE18 2DS; England; 52.5814°N 1.1193°W

Information
- Type: Academy sixth form
- Established: 1954
- Department for Education URN: 138894 Tables
- Ofsted: Reports
- Principal: Mike Wilson
- Executive Headteacher: Mark Mitchely
- Gender: Mixed
- Age: 16 to 18
- Houses: Glenne, Herrick, Wistan, De Monfort
- Colours: Yellow and purple
- Website: http://www.wigstoncollege.org

Wigston College, previously known as Guthlaxton College, is a coeducational sixth form located in Wigston Magna in the English county of Leicestershire. The college forms part of The Wigston Academies Trust, together with neighbouring Wigston Academy.

== History ==
It was established as Guthlaxton Grammar School in 1954. The school became Guthlaxton College after comprehensive education was introduced to Leicestershire. The name Guthlaxton came from the Guthlaxton hundred of Leicestershire. In September 2015 the school changed its name to Wigston College to reflect the merger of neighbouring Bushloe High School and Abington Academy into Wigston Academy, a sister school on the same site and part of the same academy trust. In 2016 Wigston Academy took over responsibility for delivering 14-16 education and Wigston College became solely a sixth form, with the final cohort of Year 11 students to study at Wigston College leaving in 2017.

== Academics ==
Wigston College offers a range of A Levels and further BTECs. The college specialises in performing arts and has dedicated facilities to support the specialism.

== Headteachers ==
- Martin J. Olivier 1954 -
- Robert Dunn (Acting Headmaster following death of M J Olivier)
- Cyril Harris
- Arthur Watthey
- Graham Norris 1981 - 1995
- Michael Fields 1995 - 2008
- John Keller 2008 - 2014
- Sally Cox 2014 - 2016
- Michael Wilson 2016 -

Executive Headteachers:

- Alex Green 2015 - 2016
- Mark Mitchley 2016 -

== Notable former pupils ==
=== Guthlaxton Grammar School ===
- Adrian Juste, disc jockey and radio presenter
- Andrew Nunn, Church of England Cathedral Dean

=== Guthlaxton College ===
- Hamza Choudhury, footballer who currently plays for Leicester City
- Brett Deacon, rugby union player, mostly played for Leicester Tigers
- Harry Panayiotou, footballer who currently plays for Aittitos Spata
