= Brett Deacon =

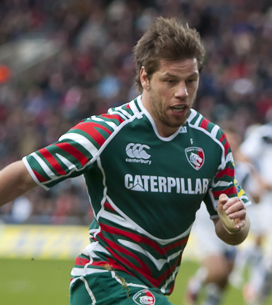
- Born: Brett Deacon; 7 March 1982 (age 44) Leicester, Leicestershire, England
- Height: 1.93 m (6 ft 4 in)
- Weight: 110 kg (17 st 5 lb)
- School: South Wigston High, Guthlaxton College
- Notable relative: Louis Deacon (brother)

Rugby union career
- Position: Flanker
Youth career
- Wigston RFC
- Syston RFC
Senior career
Years	Team	Apps	(Points)
2003–2010	Leicester Tigers	116	(30)
2010–2012	Gloucester	22	(5)
2012–2013	Leicester Tigers	19	(0)
Coaching career
- Years: Team
- 2013–: Leicester Tigers

Brett Deacon (born 7 March 1982 in Leicester, England) is an English rugby union coach and former player who notably played for Leicester Tigers in the Premiership. He is currently an assistant coach with Leicester. He played as a blindside flanker or No. 8. He is the younger brother of Leicester and England international Louis Deacon. Deacon played as a replacement when Leicester won the 2007 Premiership final.

He left Leicester Tigers at the end of the 2009–10 season after seven seasons, to play for Gloucester. In 2012, after being released from Gloucester Rugby he re-joined Leicester Tigers.

On 19 December 2013, Deacon was forced to retire due to a diagnosis of lupus, an autoimmune disease which in his case led to potentially life-threatening blood clots; he was immediately placed on blood thinners. However, he remained with Leicester Tigers to take a coaching role with their academy.
