= Don Ross (theatre producer) =

English music hall performer and producer

- Born: Donald Ross; 20 September 1902; Wigston Magna, Leicestershire, England
- Died: 6 February 1980 (aged 77); Hove, Sussex, England
- Occupation(s): Music hall performer, producer, promoter
- Spouse: Gertie Gitana

Donald Ross (20 September 1902 – 6 February 1980) was an English music hall performer, theatre producer and promoter.

== Biography ==
He was born in Wigston, Leicestershire, and in his late teens joined Papa Cragg's Gentlemen Acrobats, a travelling troupe. He learned to dance, and formed a duo, Ross & Dean, in the 1920s. In 1926, he appeared as leading man in the musical revue Dear Louise, opposite music hall star Gertie Gitana (Gertrude Astbury); they married in 1928. She always referred to him as "Bill" – the name of the part he played in the show – as did many of their close friends.

Ross became Gitana's manager, and organised a touring show, George, Gertie and Ted, with G. H. Elliott and Ted Ray. After Gitana's retirement in 1938 he started promoting his own shows, some described as "frisky frolics", which featured burlesque-style female dancers in scanty costumes. These included Wine, Women and Song, Eve Started It!, French Frolics, Naughty Girls, and Here Come the Girls.

He also put together a very successful theatre show of retired or semi-retired music hall stars in the nostalgic 1948 revue Thanks for the Memory, "a fast-moving production featuring many younger supporting artists". The featured music hall stars included Gitana, G. H. Elliott, Nellie Wallace, Randolph Sutton, Ella Shields, and Talbot O'Farrell. There were lengthy quarrels between some of the performers over who should have top billing and the best dressing room, as well as their fees, but despite the problems the show proved to be a huge success. Highlights from the show featured in the 1948 Royal Variety Performance, and it ran at Blackpool in 1949 and 1950. The closing performance of the show, in December 1950, was recorded by BBC Radio and later made available on CD.

After Gertie Gitana's death in 1957, Ross helped establish the British Music Hall Society in 1963, and was its president from its foundation until 1979. In 1966, he returned from retirement to put on shows in Great Yarmouth, and in 1968, he produced the cabaret and acted as master of ceremonies on the inaugural voyage of the new Cunard liner, the Queen Elizabeth 2. He died in Hove, Sussex, in 1980.
