= Thomas Estley Community College =

Location
- Station Road; Broughton Astley, Leicestershire, LE9 6PT; England; 52°31′47″N 1°13′22″W

Information
- Type: Academy
- Motto: Community of Courage and Commitment to Success Building Leadership and Character Together
- Department for Education URN: 138527 Tables
- Ofsted: Reports
- Head Teacher: Mandi Collins
- Gender: Coeducational
- Age: 11 to 16/17 (200)
- Colours: Navy Blue, Black
- Academy Trust: Success Academy Trust
- Website: http://thomasestley.org.uk/

Thomas Estley Community College is a coeducational secondary school with academy status, located in Broughton Astley, Leicestershire, England. It caters for students aged 11–16. It forms part of The Success Academy Trust, together with Cosby Primary School, Hallbrook Primary School and Richmond Primary School.

Subjects are: English, Science, CRE, History, Geography, French, Spanish, PE, Drama, Music, Computing, Art, Textiles, Resistant Materials, and Systems and Control. Dance, Health and Social Care, and Business are also included as a GCSE subject.

The school hosts a satellite site of Birkett House School, offering alternative education for pupils with moderate learning needs.
