= Rosemary Conley =

British business woman and writer (born 1946)

Rosemary Conley CBE
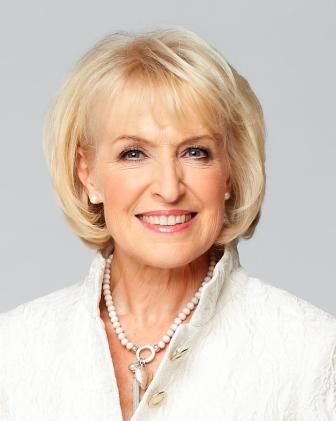
- Born: Rosemary Jean Neil Weston; 19 December 1946 (age 79); Leicester, England
- Occupations: Businesswoman, author and broadcaster
- Years active: 1971–present
- Known for: The Hip and Thigh Diet
- Spouse: Mike Rimmington (m. 1986)
- Website: rosemaryconley.com

Rosemary Jean Neil Conley CBE, DL (née Weston, born 19 December 1946) is an English businesswoman, author and broadcaster on exercise and health. Conley authored a low-fat diet and exercise programme, The Hip & Thigh Diet in 1988, which sold more than two million copies. However, her spot theory of fat reduction, which claims people can lose fat specifically from the hips and thighs, has no scientific basis.

== Early life ==
Conley attended Bushloe High School in Leicestershire and Goddards Secretarial College in Leicester. She then studied for an RSA in Exercise to Music.

== Career ==
After losing weight herself, Conley began by running evening classes for local women looking to lose weight in 1972, under the name the Slimming & Good Grooming Club. She established a number of slimming clubs, which she later sold to IPC for £50,000, working for the company to oversee the expansion of the club network. After suffering from gallstones, she adopted a low-fat diet as an alternative to surgery, and the resulting fat-loss inspired her to promote the diet to others. From 1993 to 2014, Conley had a franchised network of clubs, which became one of the "big three" alongside Slimming World and Weight Watchers, but the distinguishing feature of the clubs was that, in addition to diet advice, the classes offered a 45-minute aerobic workout with a trained instructor. Thus, it provided a fitness club for people wanting an alternative to gym membership rather than simply another slimming club, although there were similar product endorsements of foods and kitchen equipment. The franchise expanded to 180 clubs by 2004, with 80,000 members.

== Hip and Thigh Diet ==
Conley became internationally famous in 1988 via her book The Hip & Thigh Diet, which went on to sell more than two million copies. The Rosemary Conley approach is characterised by a low-fat diet regime. Conley's The Hip and Thigh Diet is a low-fat spot-reducing diet and exercise programme that promoted the idea that it could help people lose fat from the hips and thighs. However, medical experts do not believe that "this or any other diet and exercise programme can help you shed fat from some parts of your body but not others". The idea has been disproven by scientific research as studies have confirmed that "it is not possible to manipulate diet or use exercise to lose fat from specific parts of the body."

In Conley's 1993 book The Complete Hip and Thigh Diet, she promoted the idea of anatomically selective weight loss by dieting. Professor of Surgery Henry Buchwald and colleagues noted that "there is no known basis in this book or elsewhere for the support of this incredible claim". Dietician Catherine Saxelby has described the Hip and Thigh Diet as a fad diet.

== Honours ==
In 1999, Conley was appointed as deputy lieutenant of Leicestershire. In 2001, she became the first woman to be granted the Freedom of the City of Leicester. She was appointed a CBE in 2004.
