= Wigston Fields =

Coordinates: 52.592°N 1.117°W

Wigston Fields is a district of the borough of Oadby and Wigston in Leicestershire, England. It lies between Leicester and the town of Wigston on the A5199 road. The population is included in the Wigston St. Wolstan's ward of the borough council.
