= Henry W. Armstrong =

American musician and boxer (1879–1951)

- Born: July 22, 1879; Somerville, Massachusetts, US
- Died: February 22, 1951 (aged 71) New York, New York, US
- Occupation: Musician, songwriter, boxer, booking agent, producer
- Instruments: Vocals, piano

Henry W. Armstrong (July 22, 1879 – February 28, 1951) was an American boxer, booking agent, producer, singer, pianist, and Tin Pan Alley composer.

== Background ==
His biggest hit was "Sweet Adeline", written in 1903 with Richard H. Gerard. His 1905 sentimental ballad "Nellie Dean" became the signature song of the British music hall singer Gertie Gitana, and subsequently a popular British pub song.

== Works ==
- Sweet Adeline (1903)
- Arabella
- Dew Drops (1904) instrumental
- Goodbye Eyes of Blue
- Follow the crowd on a Sunday (1904)
- I love my wife, but oh you kids
- Can't You See I'm Lonely (1905)
- I'd like a girl like you
- The Twilight (1905)
- In the golden autumn days sweet Jennie Ray
- You're my heart's desire, I love you Nellie Dean (1905)
- Just a line from Jennie
- When the Evening Twilight Bids the Day Good-Bye (1906)
- Miss Dinah
- Baby Doll (1908)
- Only a Flower by the Wayside
- I Could Learn To Love You (1908)
- Rianza Waltzes- instrumental
- The Frisco Rag (1909) instrumental
- A Rose of Plymouth Town
- Shaky Eyes (1909)
- Tales the moon could tell
- Slip your glad rags on and come with me (1910) *When you have time and money
- The Chimes (1912)
- When you've won the only girl you love
