= Gertie Gitana =

British singer

- Gitana ca. 1919

Background information
- Born: Gertrude Mary Astbury; 27 December 1887; Longport, Staffordshire, England
- Died: 5 January 1957 (aged 69) Hampstead, London, England
- Genre: Music hall
- Occupations: Singer, dancer, entertainer

Gertie Gitana (born Gertrude Mary Astbury; 27 December 1887 – 5 January 1957) was an English music hall entertainer.

== Biography ==
She was born in Shirley Street, Longport, Stoke-on-Trent. Her father was a pottery works foreman and her mother Lavinia managed a shop. When she was three, the family moved to Frederic Street in nearby Hanley. She was a member of Tomkinson's "Royal Gipsy Children" at the age of four, performing on local stages; gitana is Spanish (and Italian) for "Gipsy girl". She made her solo professional debut in 1896 at the age of eight on the stage of The Tivoli in Barrow-in-Furness. Two years later at the age of ten she had a significant billing at The Argyle in Birkenhead, and her first London appearance was in 1900. On account of her petite form and supposed Gipsy origins, she was sometimes billed as "The Staffordshire Cinderella".

By the age of 15, she was earning over £100 per week, more than her father earned in a year. At the age of 17, she topped the bill for the first time at The Ardwick Empire at Manchester. As well as singing, she entertained by tap dancing, yodelling, and playing the saxophone. Her music hall repertoire included "A Schoolgirl's Holiday", "We've been chums for fifty years", "When the Harvest Moon is Shining", "Silver Bell", "You do Look Well in Your Old Dutch Bonnet", "Queen of the Cannibal Isles", "Never Mind", "When I see the Lovelight Gleaming", and especially "Nellie Dean" – written by Henry W. Armstrong – which an audience first heard her sing in 1907. "Nellie Dean", which was a song her brother had heard while in the United States, was an instant success and became her 'signature tune'. Her first gramophone recordings, dating from 1911–1913, were made in London on the Jumbo label.

During the 1914–18 war she was the forces' sweetheart and often entertained the war wounded in hospitals. In her prime, her name was always sufficient to ensure a full house. After the war, she appeared in pantomime, notably as Little Red Riding Hood, and Cinderella. She was reputed to have said the line in Cinderella, "Here I sit, all alone/ I think I'll play my saxophone", before removing it from the stage chimney and playing it. Two musical shows were specially written for her: Nellie Dean and Dear Louise, and in 1928 she married her leading man in the latter, Don Ross.

She retired in 1938 but made a very successful comeback ten years later with other "old timers" in the show Thanks for the Memory produced by her husband. The show was the centrepiece of the Royal Command Performance in 1948. Her final appearance was on 2 December 1950 at the Empress Theatre, Brixton.

She died of cancer on 5 January 1957 in Hampstead, London, aged 69, and is buried in Wigston Cemetery on Welford Rd, Wigston Magna, Leicestershire, which was her husband's birthplace. Some lines of the song "Nellie Dean" are engraved on the gravestone.

== Legacy ==
In the early 1950s, Frederic Street in Hanley, Stoke-on-Trent, was renamed Gitana Street in her honour; the street leads to the rear of the Theatre Royal in Hanley and the public house now called The Stage Door (at the corner of Gitana Street) was at one time called The Gertie Gitana and it still has her portrait over the door. Her name continues at Gitana's, a public house in Hartshill Road, Stoke-on-Trent.

A bench on Edinburgh's Princes Street Gardens has been named in her honour. The inscription reads "A Loving Remembrance of Gertie Gitana Music Hall Artiste" followed by the lyrics "There's An Old Mill by the Stream Nelly Dean". (Note the incorrect spelling of "Nellie".) Her London memorial — "The Nellie Dean" at the corner of Dean Street in Soho (renamed thus in her honour) — at one time had a shrine of her stage memorabilia. In Cockney rhyming slang, Gertie Gitana means a banana. (As she said herself, Gitana "rhymes with banana.")
