= Nellie Wallace =

British music hall performer (1870–1948)

- Born: Eleanor Jane Wallis Tayler; 18 March 1870; Glasgow, Scotland
- Died: 24 November 1948 (aged 78); London, England
- Occupations: Actress, comedienne, dancer and songwriter
- Known for: Music hall performance
- Notable work: The Golden Pippin Girl; The Wishbone; Radio Parade of 1935

Nellie Wallace (18 March 1870 – 24 November 1948) was a British music hall star, actress, comedienne, dancer and songwriter who became one of the most famous and best loved music hall performers. She became known as "The Essence of Eccentricity". She dressed in ultra-tight skirts — so tight in fact, that she would lie down on the stage and shuffle back and forth on her back to pick up whatever she had contrived to drop. Her hat sported a lone daisy, feather, or fish bone, and once even a lit candle — supposedly, so she could see where she was going and where she had been.

== Biography ==
Wallace was born in Glasgow in 1870 as Eleanor Jane Wallis Tayler. Her father, Francis George Tayler, was a vocalist and musician and her mother a retired actress who became a teacher and governess.

Her first solo performance on the stage was as a clog dancer at the age of 12 in Birmingham. Prior to this, she had performed with her sisters Emma and Fanny, also singers and dancers. She performed in provincial theatres, sometimes as a dancer known as "La Petite Nellie", and in pantomimes for several years with little success. She was called upon to replace Ada Reeve in pantomime in Manchester in 1895, after which she started to become better known.

She developed her own strand of eccentric comedy and made her London debut in 1903. By 1910 she was an established star, given billing at the London Palladium. Not a naturally pretty woman, a reviewer noted her 'grotesque get-up', which started the audience laughing the moment she appeared on stage; her cleverness, vivacity and facial expressions were second to none. She deliberately made herself appear ugly, and performed in a multicoloured jumper, a very tight hobble skirt, a skimpy feather boa or moth-eaten fur stole which she described as her "little bit of vermin", and a hat decorated with an old feather or fish bone. She spoke on stage in a "quaint, constrained, confidential voice, sometimes sounding as though she was talking to herself...".

Her main character was a frustrated spinster, singing ribald songs such as "Under the Bed," "Let's Have a Tiddley at the Milk Bar" and "Mother's Pie Crust." Other well-known songs in her repertoire included: "Meet Me," "The Sniff Song," "Three Cheers for the Red White & Blue," "Half Past Nine," "Geranium," "Tally Ho!," "The Blasted Oak," "Three Times a Day" and "Bang! Bang! Bang!" Her appearance made her unusually successful as a pantomime dame — a role usually performed by men.

Wallace appeared in a "short", filmed in 1902, entitled: A Lady's First lesson on the Bicycle and directed by James Williamson. She later moved into bigger budget productions and appeared in The Golden Pippin Girl (1920); The Wishbone (1933); Radio Parade of 1935 (1934), alongside fellow music hall performer Lily Morris and established actor Will Hay; Variety (1935) and Boys Will Be Girls (1936). She made several successful tours of North America, and in England starred in revues with George Robey, Billy Merson and others. In 1930 she played the part of Widow Twankey at the Dominion Theatre a rare exception to a comic role normally played by men. She toured with ENSA in the Second World War, and in 1948 was one of the stars of Don Ross's show Thanks for the Memory, appearing in the Royal Command Performance of that year.

Nellie Wallace died in a London nursing home on 24 November 1948, aged 78, after a serious bout of bronchitis. She had been married to William Henry Liddy, comic actor, who died in 1921; their daughter Nora pre-deceased Nellie earlier in 1948, and it was said that Nellie "lost the will to live".
