= Wigston Academy =

Location
- Station Road; Wigston, Leicestershire, LE18 2DU; England
- Coordinates: 52.5814°N 1.115°W

Information
- Type: Academy
- Motto: "Learn, Aspire & Achieve"
- Established: 2015
- Trust: The Wigston Academies Trust
- Department for Education URN: 137984 Tables
- Ofsted: Reports
- Gender: Mixed
- Age: 11 to 16
- Colours: Yellow and Blue
- Website: http://www.wigstonacademy.org

Wigston Academy is a mixed secondary school located in Wigston, Leicestershire, England. It was formed in September 2015 through the merger of Abington Academy and Bushloe High School. The school forms part of The Wigston Academies Trust, together with neighbouring Wigston College.

== History ==
The school opened on 1 September 2015.

=== Previous Schools ===
Abington High School opened in 1954 although its history is traceable back to 1934.

Bushloe High School opened in September 1959 and was completely rebuilt in 2006 as part of the 1997-2010 Labour Government's Building School for the Future program.
