= Leicester Grammar School =

Location
- London Road; Great Glen, Leicestershire, LE8 9FL; England; 52°34′47″N 1°02′38″W

Information
- Type: Private co-educational day school
- Religious affiliation: Church of England
- Established: 1981
- Department for Education URN: 120334 Tables
- Headmaster: Magnus Anderson
- Chief Executive: Stephen Jeffries
- Staff: approximately 90 teachers, 40 support
- Gender: Mixed
- Age: 10 to 18
- Enrollment: 1282
- Houses: Masters, Dukes, Judges and Vice-Chancellors
- Colours: Gold and navy
- Publication: The Leicestrian, The Peacock Magazine
- Website: https://www.lgs-senior.org.uk/

Leicester Grammar School (often abbreviated to LGS) is a private co-educational secondary day school situated in Great Glen, Leicestershire, England. It was founded in 1981, after the loss of the city's state-funded grammar schools.

Leicester Grammar School is closely affiliated with Leicester Grammar Junior School and Stoneygate School, and in general the majority of Junior School leavers are accepted by the senior school.

The school has just over 90 teaching staff and 830 pupils, all of whom are day-students. It has its own preparatory form for children in Year 6, and its own sixth form for Years 12 and 13. Each student at the school is a member of a house, allowing a system of inter-school competition in sports and other pastimes such as chess, general knowledge and music.

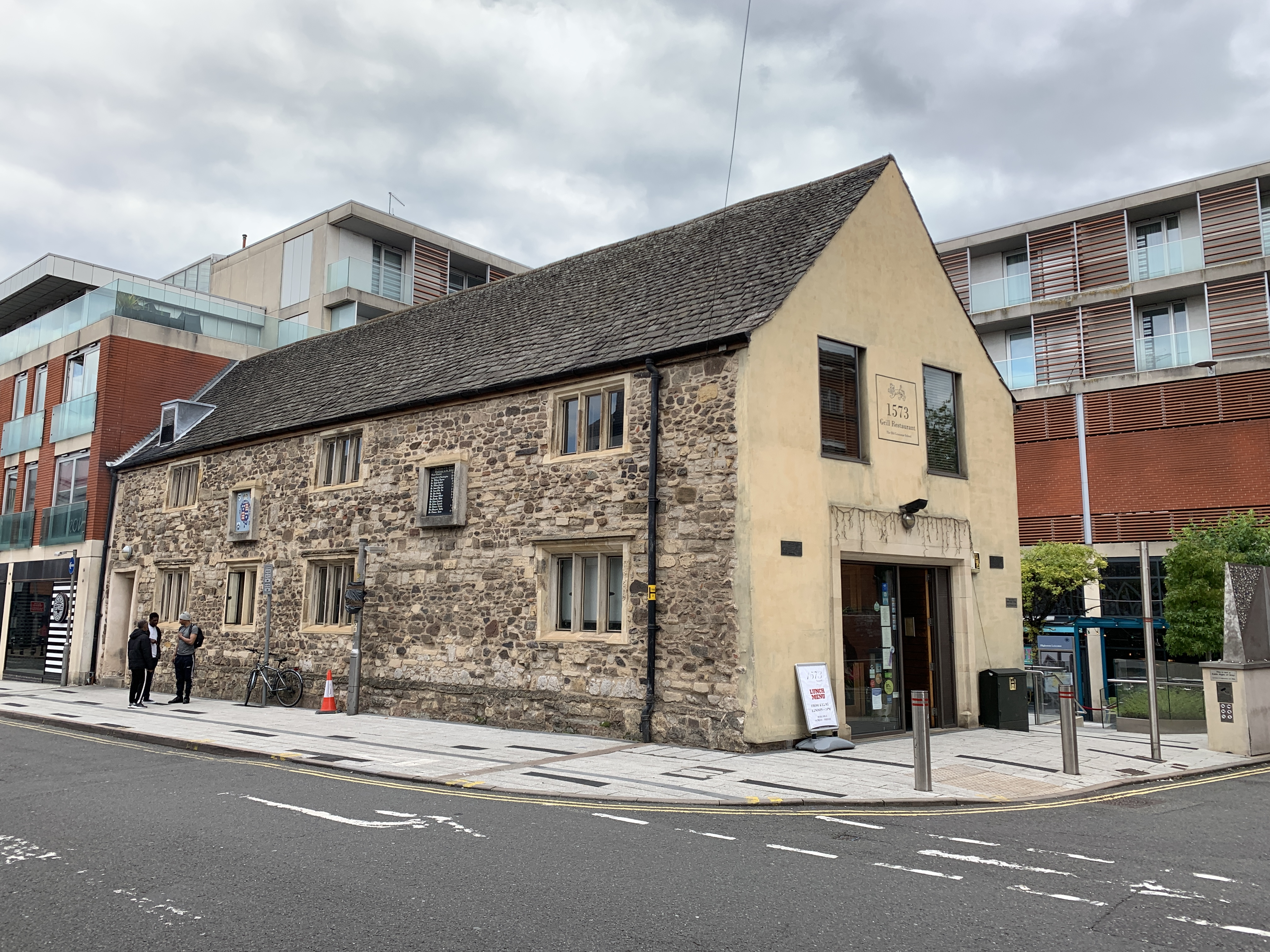
The Free Grammar School Leicester, also referred to as 'The Old Grammar School'. The current school is located outside the city centre.

== History ==
=== Founding ===
The school was founded in 1981 as a private, selective, co-educational day school in an attempt to recapture the standards and traditions of the city's former grammar schools. Located in four late-Victorian buildings in Leicester City Centre, the school was established close to Leicester Cathedral and was founded with an Anglican Christian ethos. The first headmaster was John Higginbotham and under his stewardship the school grew from just 96 to 560 pupils within 10 years.

=== Development ===
Over its short history, the school began to achieve a national reputation as one of the country's leading academic institutions. In 1993, its headmaster was elected to the Headmasters' Conference. In the same year, the school was acknowledged as the country's top co-educational school.

=== Relocation ===
In February 2007 construction began on a new school campus, located on a green field site near Great Glen. The new development allowed for school growth, restricted by its former location within the city centre. Leicester Grammar Senior School now shares the new site with its sister school Leicester Grammar Junior School, each with its own main school buildings and sharing the refectory and sports facilities. Previously, the school had no playing fields of its own and had to transport pupils to various sporting facilities by bus; the new school has 75 acres (30 ha) of playing fields. The new site opened in September 2008.

== Entrance assessment ==
In common with many other private schools, Leicester Grammar School requires prospective pupils to undertake a series of entrance examinations before they are accepted into the school. The main entrance examination takes place at the start of the term in January. Papers are taken in verbal reasoning, English and mathematics. Entry to the sixth form is by interview, offers of a place being conditional upon the GCSE grades gained.

== Location ==
As of 2008 Leicester Grammar School moved to London Road, Great Glen, a much larger site. There is one main teaching building, which includes a refectory, assembly hall (St. Nicholas), drama studio, music recital room and five wings housing all classrooms.

== Education ==
Leicester Grammar provides education for approximately 810 (2012–2013) pupils aged between 10 and 18, including GCSEs and A-Levels. Some of the rarer subjects offered by the school include Ancient Greek and Latin (Latin is compulsory for years 7 and 8).

=== Sports ===
As Leicester Grammar School was situated in the centre of Leicester, pupils were transported by bus to various sporting activities in and around Leicester, but since the 2008 relocation most sports are now played on site. Leicester Grammar School is surrounded by 75 acres of playing fields with two all-weather hockey pitches [one sand-based and one water-based], 5 rugby pitches, a dedicated cricket pitch, 8 floodlit hard tennis courts/netball courts along with a standalone pavilion with integral catering and changing facilities. The indoor sports complex offers multi-use courts for badminton, basketball and netball. Indoor cricket nets and table tennis are also available in the main hall along with a fitness suite, a gym/dance studio and a swimming pool.

Over fifty teams represent the school in the major sports of Netball, Rugby, Football, Hockey, Cricket, Athletics and Tennis. A diverse range of team and individual activities form part of the extra-curricular programme. A large number of students represent Leicestershire and regularly achieve regional and international representation in a variety of sports. School teams from all age groups are winners of county and regional level competitions.

The school has close relationships with Leicester Tigers, Leicester Ladies' Hockey and Leicester Men's Hockey teams, with current and past pupils representing these clubs at all levels.

=== Houses ===
A vertical house system complements the tutorial system. Houses meet regularly to take part in competitions and events, which provide a broad range of opportunities for healthy competition and development of team spirit. There are four houses – Dukes, Judges, Masters and Vice-Chancellors (also known as VCs). Each house has approximately a quarter of the school population and it is traditional that siblings are always allocated to the same house.

Inter house competitions are run throughout the academic year and culminate in the award of the Midland Bank Cup, for overall winners.

== Uniform ==
Leicester Grammar School pupils are obliged to wear a basic school uniform. Pupils in lower years must wear navy blue blazers, white shirts, either charcoal trousers or a tartan skirt, and a tie embossed with the school emblem. Sixth form pupils are able to wear suits and ties or formal wear as long as they are deemed presentable to the public. Leicester Grammar School also issues an obligatory uniform for sports and physical education lessons.

=== House jumpers ===
Pupils in years below the sixth form are expected to wear a house jumper- a V-necked jumper with a line of colour (of their respective house) running around the neckline. These are Dukes - Red, Judges - Blue, Masters - Yellow and VCs - Green.

== Local ties ==
The school is closely linked with Leicester Grammar Junior School, for which the Leicester Grammar School Trust was given responsibility in 1992 by the Sisters of Charity of St. Paul, based in Selly Park, Birmingham

Leicester Grammar School has retained its link to Leicester Cathedral despite a significant presence of pupils from other faiths in the school. Choir rehearsals, School Foundation Day and Christmas services were held in the cathedral, as well as most daily school assemblies; however since the relocation these are held in the St Nicholas Hall.

== Old Leicestrians ==
Former pupils of Leicester Grammar School are known as Old Leicestrians.

- Harry Ellis, a former rugby player for the Leicester Tigers and England.
- Harry Thacker, a rugby player for Leicester Tigers and Bristol Bears.
- James Oldfield, an opera singer.
- Luke Abraham, a rugby player for the Leicester Tigers who has represented England U18 and England U21.
- Finn Carnduff, a rugby player for the Leicester Tigers who has represented England U18 and captained England national under-20 rugby union team.
- Sarah Teather, a British politician who was the Member of Parliament for Brent East.
- Paolo Odogwu, a rugby player for Sale Sharks.
- Avish Patel, a first-class cricketer

== See also ==
- Leicester Guildhall
