= Wigston =

Town in Leicestershire, England

Coordinates: 52.5812°N 1.093°W

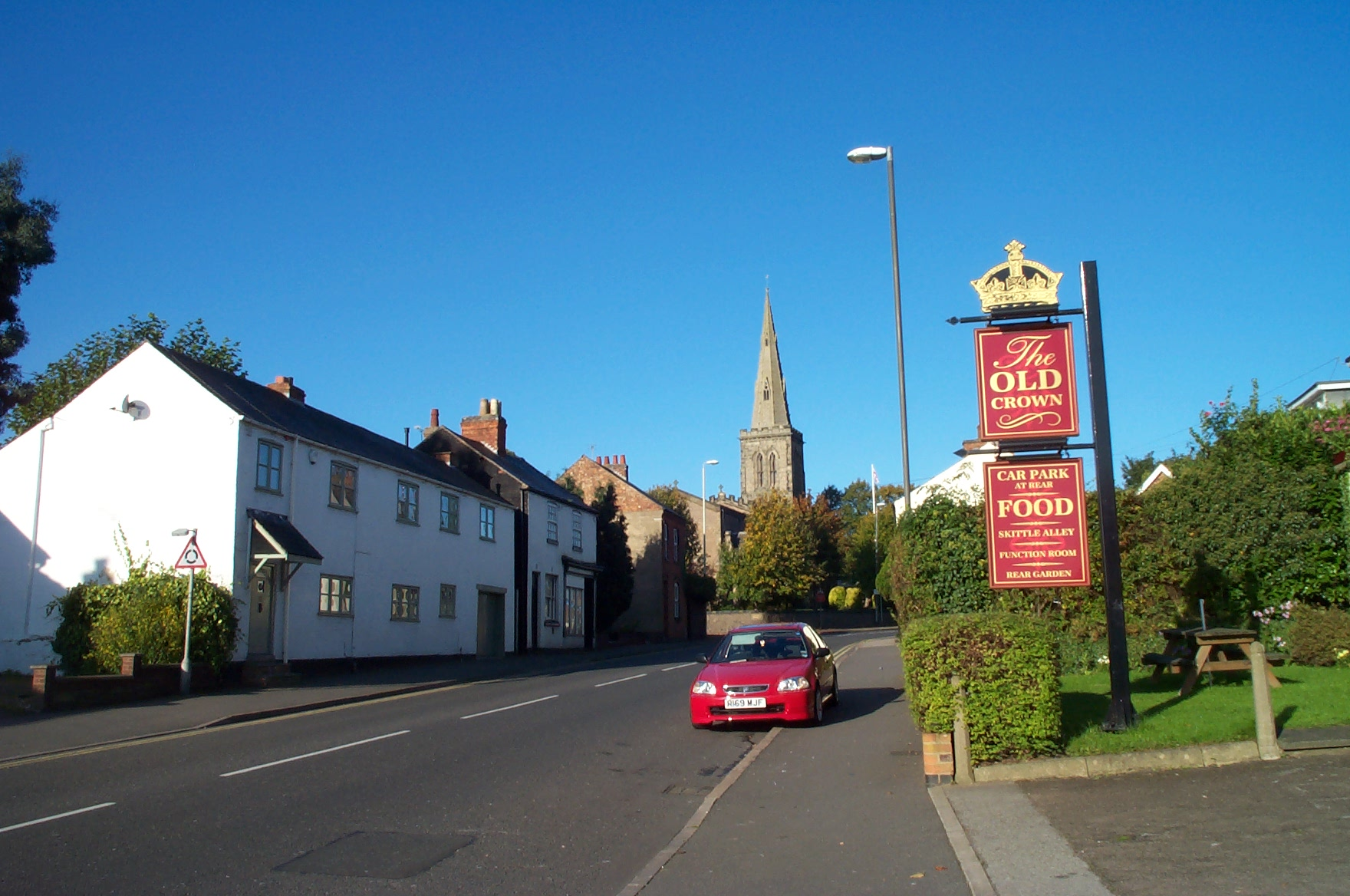
- Moat Street, Wigston (2008)

- Location within Leicestershire
- Population: 37,260 (2024)
- OS grid reference: SP6197
  - London: 85.35 mi (137.36 km)
- District: Oadby and Wigston
- Shire county: Leicestershire
- Region: East Midlands
- Country: England
- Sovereign state: United Kingdom
- Post town: WIGSTON
- Postcode district: LE18
- Dialling code: 0116
- Police: Leicestershire
- Fire: Leicestershire
- Ambulance: East Midlands
- UK Parliament: Harborough, Oadby and Wigston
- Website: Oadby & Wigston Borough Council

Wigston, or Wigston Magna, is a town in the Oadby and Wigston district of Leicestershire, England, just south of Leicester on the A5199. It had a population of 37,261 in 2024.

== Geography ==
Wigston is 4 miles (6.4 km) south of the city of Leicester, at the centre of Leicestershire and the East Midlands. Oadby is 1 mile (1.6 km) to the east, connected by the B582 road. To the west along the B582, or Blaby Road is South Wigston, 1 mile (1.6 km).

The Grand Union Canal runs along a southern route below Wigston from Newton Harcourt 2 miles (3.2 km), Kilby Bridge 1 mile (1.6 km), and for several miles through South Wigston, Glen Parva 2 miles (3.2 km), Blaby 3 miles (4.8 km) and on towards Leicester.

Wigston's population of approximately 32,000 live in both the post-war private suburban housing estates surrounding the old town centre, and the 19th century buildings now sandwiched between modern housing developments. The oldest of the post-war developments is Wigston Fields north of Wigston towards Knighton and Leicester; the Meadows and Little Hill estates were developed in the 1970s and 1980s to the east and south of Wigston's old centre. Wigston Harcourt is an area of housing developed up until the early 1990s between the Little Hill and Meadows estates. These three estates mark the boundary of the greater Leicester urban area, beyond which lies agricultural land.

== History ==
One of the earliest records of Wigston is in the Domesday Book of 1086 as Wichingstone in the ancient wapentake of Guthlaxton, listed amongst the lands held by Hugh de Grandmesnil for the King.

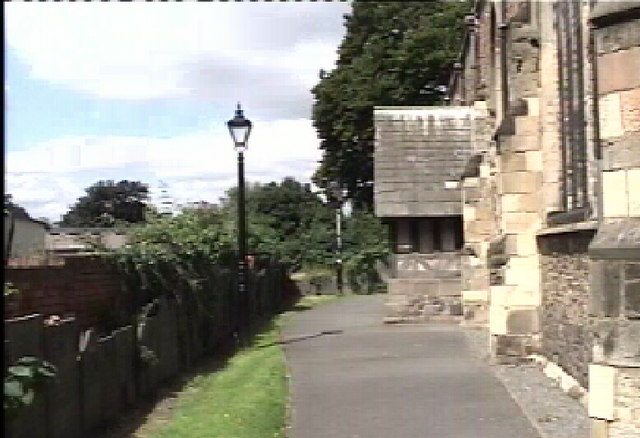
The south side of the church of All Saints

In the Middle Ages it was known as Wigston Two Spires as, unusually, there were two mediaeval churches there, All Saints' and St Wistan's.

St Wistan's is so called because it was one of the places where the body of St Wistan or Wigstan rested before burial. Wigstan was a Mercian prince who was assassinated, but was regarded as a martyr. He was initially buried at Repton, but his body was then moved to Evesham.

All Saints' (illustrated above right) a fine medieval building in the Transitional style has a western steeple (one of the finest in the county); from the tower three monster arches lead into the nave; beneath a sepulchral arch is a coffin lid surmounted by a headless figure.

Wigston was the subject of W. G. Hoskins's pioneering historical study, The Midland Peasant (London: Macmillan, 1965), which traced the social history of this town from earliest recorded history into the 19th century.

=== Notable people ===
It was the birthplace of George Davenport, a notorious highwayman; Abigail Herrick, the mother of Jonathan Swift, author of Gulliver's Travels; and former Leicester Tigers and England scrum-half Harry Ellis who attended Bushloe High School. Graham Chapman, of Monty Python fame, lived (around 1951/52) in what was then Wigston police station, (the building on the corner of Pullman Road – opposite the swimming baths) during the time that his father was the inspector there. He attended South Wigston Junior School. Composer and piano virtuoso Michael Garrett was educated at Guthlaxton school. The music hall star Gertie Gitana is buried in Wigston cemetery, having been married for many years to local theatrical impresario Don Ross, who was born in the town. She died in 1957, having been a showbiz celebrity in the early years of the 20th century.

Henry Davis Pochin, the manufacturing chemist who later owned the Bodnant Estate (now the National Trust's Bodnant Garden), was born in Wigston.

=== Museum ===
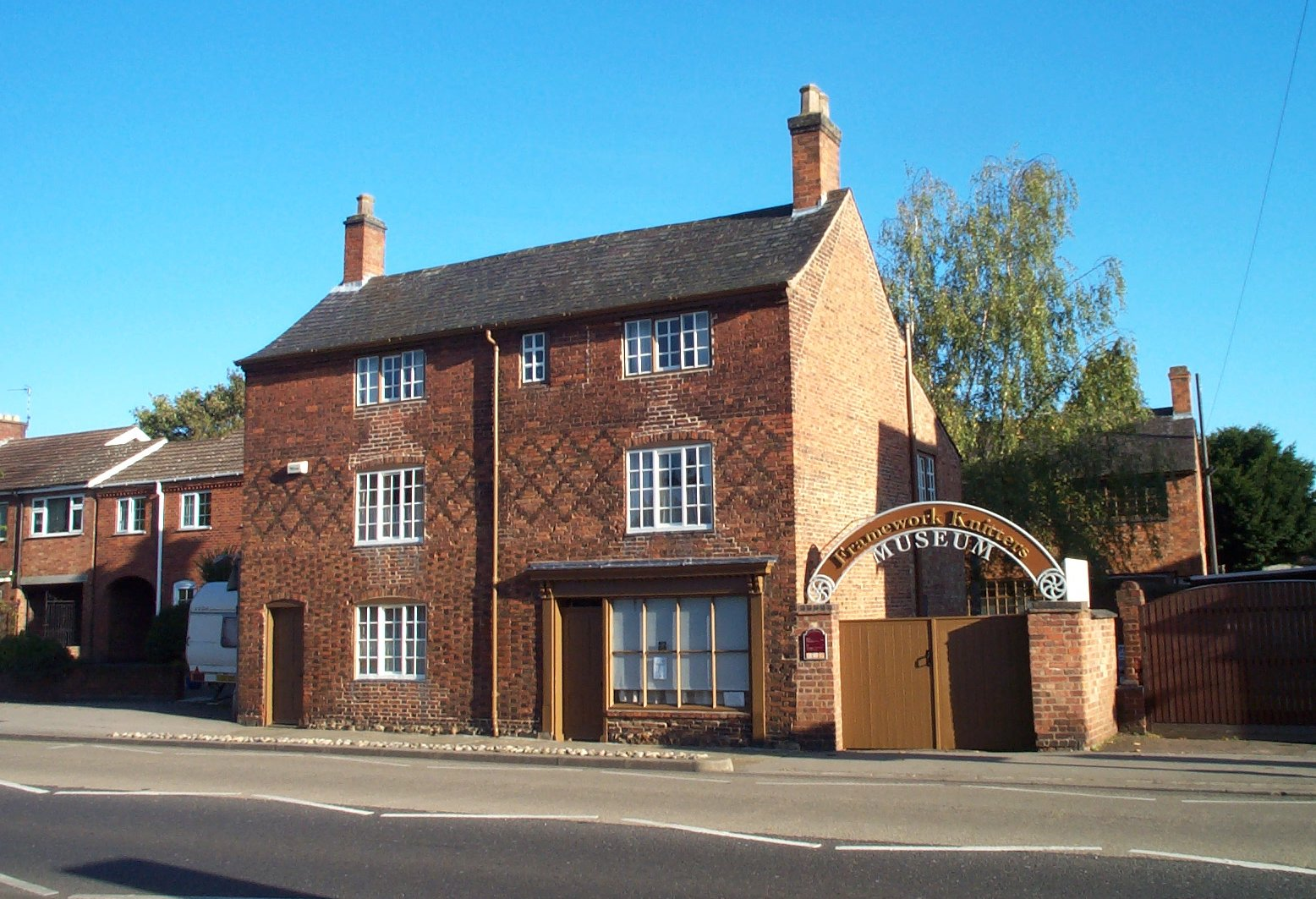
Framework Knitting Museum (2008)

Bushloe House, the offices of Oadby and Wigston Borough Council until 2023, was originally a c. 1850 house which was extended c. 1880. The interior decoration of the house and the design of most of the furniture (and possibly the design of the extension) was carried out by Christopher Dresser for the owner, his solicitor, Hiram Abiff Owston (1830–1905).

There is a Framework Knitting Museum, as it was an important occupation in this area from the 17th to 19th centuries. Hosiery manufacture continued to be an important industry in the town after the decline of hand process of framework knitting with manufacturing firms such as Two Steeples, George Deacon and sons, Wigston Co-Operative Hosiers, A. H. Broughton and William Holmes. In neighbouring South Wigston Henry Bates was the leading hosiery manufacturer.

== Economy ==
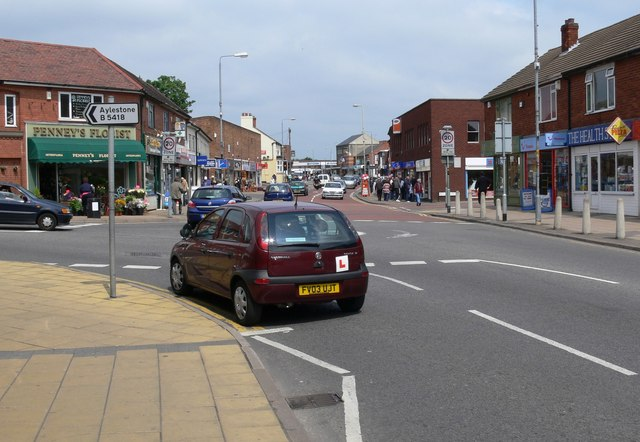
Wigston shopping parade (2008)

Since the 1980s Wigston's retail economy has become increasingly dependent on national retailers. Up to 50% of retail in the town belongs to supermarkets and chain stores. The share of local business has caused local and independent businesses to close. This followed the trend of the 1990s homogenisation of British high streets. There are also a number of independent stores including several charity shops, two car dealerships, hair and beauty salons, opticians, florists, fish and chip shop, newsagents, and public houses.

In January 2022 W. H. Cox greengrocers located on Leicester Road (opposite Bell Street) announced it would be closing after trading for 134 years.

== Education ==
There are numerous primary schools in Wigston including All Saints Primary School, Glenmere Primary School (which is now Grade II Listed), Little Hill Primary School, The Meadow Community Primary School, Thythorn Field Community Primary School and Water Leys Primary School.

Wigston Academy is the secondary school for the area. It was formed in September 2015 from the merger of Abington Academy and Bushloe High School. Wigston College (formerly known as Guthlaxton College) is the post-16 provider for the area. Both institutions are part of Wigston Academies Trust.

Wigston Birkett House Community Special School is a special school located in the town that serves the wider area.

South Leicestershire College is a large further education provider for the area. It was rebuilt on Canal Street, South Wigston in 2010.

1461 (Wigston) Squadron of the Air Training Corps is located in Tigers Road, South Wigston, and recruits many members from the schools in Wigston.

== Media ==
Local news and television programmes are provided by BBC East Midlands and ITV Central. Television signals are received from the Waltham TV transmitter.

Local radio stations are BBC Radio Leicester, Capital East Midlands, Smooth East Midlands, Hits Radio East Midlands, Greatest Hits Radio Midlands, and Cross Counties Radio, a community based radio station.

The town is served by the local newspaper, Leicester Mercury (formerly Oadby, Wigston & Blaby Mail).

== Transport ==
South Wigston railway station lies on the Birmingham to Peterborough Line. Trains to Leicester run every hour and take five minutes.

Wigston Magna and the surrounding estates are served by bus services operated by Arriva Midlands and Centrebus.
