= Nellie Dean =

1905 song composed by Henry W. Armstrong

- Song by Henry W. Armstrong
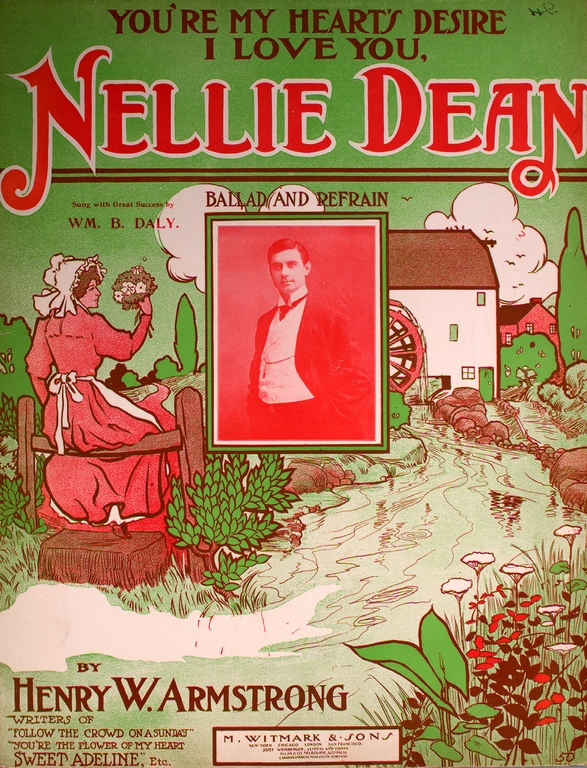
- 1905 sheet music cover with inset photo of singer William B. Daly
- Genre: Sentimental ballad
- Language: English
- Published: 1905, M. Witmark & Sons
- Scoring: Voice and piano

Nellie Dean
Sung by the Columbia Quartet

"(You're My Heart's Desire, I Love You) Nellie Dean" is a sentimental ballad in common time by Henry W. Armstrong, published in 1905 by M. Witmark & Sons of New York City. The original sheet music is scored in B-flat major for voice and piano and marked andante moderato.

It was taken up in 1907 by the British music hall singer Gertie Gitana, becoming her most famous song. It subsequently became popular in the UK as a pub song, particularly the chorus (There's an old mill by the stream, Nellie Dean…), which was often sung by itself. A book published in 1977 claimed that "The song most often sung in pubs during the present century must surely be Nellie Dean."

Armstrong also performed the song himself. In 1945, when he was 66, Billboard magazine reported he "picked up an extra hand from the British seamen with his throating of 'Nellie Dean'" during a show in Brooklyn put on by the entertainment unit of the Songwriters' Protective Association.

Ellen (Nelly) Dean is the main narrator of Emily Brontë's novel Wuthering Heights, but its plot bears no apparent relation to the lyrics of this song.

== Early recordings ==
Early recordings of the song omit the second verse, which would have made the duration of the song too long for early sound recording media.

The song was recorded by vocal duo Byron G. Harlan (tenor) and Frank C. Stanley (baritone) with orchestral accompaniment in 1905 on Edison Gold Moulded phonograph cylinder.

Gertie Gitana recorded the song in 1911 on the Jumbo label and again in 1931 for Edison Bell Radio.

The Columbia Quartet made a recording in January 1913 on Columbia Records. The song was also recorded by the Columbia Stellar Quartette in December 1919 and released by the Columbia Graphophone Company as a 10-inch 78 rpm gramophone record in 1920.
