= Sparkenhoe =

Historical division of Leicestershire, England

Coordinates: 52.6°N 1.4°W

Sparkenhoe was a hundred of Leicestershire, England in the south-west of the county, covering Market Bosworth and Hinckley, broadly corresponding to the modern districts of Blaby and Hinckley and Bosworth. The meeting place of the Sparkenhoe Hundred was probably at Shericles Farm near Desford (SK467026), which derives from scirac (?) meaning "the hundred oak". Sparkenhoe hundred was not recorded in the Domesday Book as a wapentake, being formed in 1346 from part of Guthlaxton and Goscote.
