= Luke Abraham =

English rugby union player

- Born: 26 September 1983 (age 43) Leicester, England
- Height: 6 ft 2 in (1.88 m)
- Weight: 107 kg (16 st 12 lb)
- School: Bushloe High School; Leicester Grammar School

Rugby union career
- Position: Flanker
Senior career
Years	Team	Apps	(Points)
2003–2008	Leicester Tigers	73	
2008–2010	Sale Sharks	29	
2010–2014	Lyon OU	36	
International career
Years	Team	Apps	(Points)
- England U18
- England U19
- England Saxons

Luke Abraham (born 26 September 1983), also known as the AK-47, is a retired professional rugby union player, who played for Leicester Tigers & Sale Sharks in Premiership Rugby and Lyon OU in the French Top 14 between 2003 and 2014.

== Career ==
A strong and pacy Leicester-born back-row player, Abraham came through the ranks after joining Leicester Tigers at the age of 15. He took up the sport three years earlier at Bushloe High School and joined his local club, the Vipers RFC, before becoming part of the Tigers set-up. He made his first-team debut as an 18-year-old against Worcester Warriors in January 2002.

A former England U-18, U-19 and U-21 international, he has also played for the England Saxons. Abraham had a short spell playing at hooker during his time with Nelson's Bay Club Stoke in New Zealand during the summer of 2005. He was an U-21 League winner with the Tigers in 2002–03. He also won the Guinness A League in 2004–05 and 2005–06. He played an important role in the 2006–07 Guinness Premiership and the 2006–07 Heineken Cup double-winning campaign, making 12 Guinness Premiership appearances including eight starts as well as a single appearance in the 2006–07 EDF Energy Cup success.

In May 2008 it was announced that he had signed for Sale Sharks for the 2008–09 Guinness Premiership.

For the 2010–11 Rugby Pro D2 season, Abraham signed for Lyon OU.
