= James Oldfield =

English singer (b.1981)

James Oldfield (born in October 1981 in Ipswich, UK) is an English bass-baritone. In 2008 he was awarded a Sybil Tutton Award from the Musicians Benevolent Fund, and in 2010 he was given the Leonard Ingrams Award from Garsington Opera.

== Biography ==
James Oldfield was a chorister at Leicester Cathedral whilst a pupil at Leicester Grammar School. He then became a choral scholar at Trinity College, Cambridge under Dr Richard Marlow, where he read geography. From 2006 to 2009 he studied at the Royal College of Music, including two years in the Benjamin Britten International Opera School. He studied singing with countertenor Ashley Stafford.

Oldfield made his international debut singing Handel's Messiah in the Dublin Handel Festival, and his operatic debut in Purcell's The Fairy Queen with the Retrospect Ensemble, conducted by Matthew Halls. In 2010 he made his UK operatic debut as Figaro in Le nozze di Figaro for Garsington Opera. In November 2010 he sang the role of Nick Shadow in The Rake's Progress for Gothenburg Opera, followed by his debut with the Royal Opera House as Ludd in Ludd and Isis by Stephen Taylor.

He has performed in the Royal Festival Hall, the Royal Albert Hall, the Barbican, St John's Smith Square, Birmingham Symphony Hall, Bridgewater Hall and the Wigmore Hall. Oldfield has appeared as a soloist with the Hallé, Royal Philharmonic Orchestra, London Symphony Orchestra,

== Operatic repertoire ==
- Zuniga in Carmen by Bizet
- Bottom in A Midsummer Night's Dream by Britten
- Noye in Noye's Fludde by Britten
- Swallow in Peter Grimes by Britten
- Collatinus in The Rape of Lucretia by Britten
- Polyphemus in Acis and Galatea by Handel
- Clito in Alessandro by Handel
- Achilla in Giulio Cesare by Handel
- Ormonte in Partenope by Handel
- Forester in The Cunning Little Vixen by Janáček
- Seneca in L'incoronazione di Poppea by Monteverdi
- Alfonso in Così fan tutte by Mozart
- Sarastro in The Magic Flute by Mozart
- Figaro in The Marriage of Figaro by Mozart
- Aeneas in Dido and Aeneas by Purcell
- All the bass roles in The Fairy Queen by Purcell
- Bruschino padre in Il Signor Bruschino by Rossini
- Nick Shadow in The Rake's Progress by Stravinsky
- Gremin in Yevgeny Onegin by Tchaikovsky

== Concert repertoire ==
Oldfield has performed most of the standard concert repertoire for basses and baritones. He is well known for his interpretations of the requiems of Brahms, Mozart, Fauré, Duruflé and Saint-Saëns, the passions of J.S. Bach, and oratorios by Handel. Oldfield also regularly performs Orff's Carmina Burana, Elgar's Dream of Gerontius, Rossini's Petite Messe Solennelle and Puccini's Messa di Gloria.

== Discography ==
Oldfield has recorded Monteverdi's Vespers of 1610 for Signum Records, James MacMillan's Seven Last Words from the Cross for Naxos, and Handel's Messiah. The latter was recorded live with the Huddersfield Choral Society, with Oldfield having taken the part on extremely short notice.
