= Leicester High School for Girls =

Location
- London Road; Leicester, LE2 2PP; England; 52°36′31″N 1°05′52″W

Information
- Type: Private day school
- Religious affiliation: Christian
- Established: 1906
- Founder: Mrs. Holles
- Local authority: Leicester City
- Headmaster: John Partridge
- Gender: Girls
- Age: 3 to 18
- Enrolment: c. 249
- Houses: Beaumanor, Bradgate and Charnwood
- Colours: Dark and light blue
- Website: http://www.leicesterhigh.co.uk/

Leicester High School for Girls also known as 'LHS' is an independent day school for girls aged 3–18 situated in South Knighton, Leicester. It was originally a coeducational school but is now an all-girls school.

== History ==
The school was founded in 1906 as a Christian foundation, welcoming pupils of all faiths and none. It was constituted as a charitable trust in 1975, and is administered by a board of governors which has oversight of both the senior school and junior department. The school was originally called Portland House, and pupils wore distinctive uniforms of yellow and blue striped blazers, grey skirts and straw boaters. The current name has been in existence since 1985, with an update of the uniform taking place in 2006, the school's centenary year.

== Extracurricular Activities ==
There are many after-school activities available ranging from community service projects to interest clubs to performing arts and music groups.
