= West Goscote =

Coordinates: 52°45′N 01°20′W

West Goscote was a hundred of Leicestershire, that arose from the division of the ancient Goscote hundred into two. It covers the north west of the county, an area broadly corresponding to the western part of Charnwood district along with North West Leicestershire.

The hundred's main town was Loughborough. Other settlements include Ashby-de-la-Zouch, Coalville and Overseal (now in Derbyshire).

The hundred was created by the subdivision of the Goscote hundred in 1346.
