= Cofresh =

UK snack manufacturer

Cofresh Snack Foods
- Founded: 1974
- Headquarters: Leicester, UK
- Parent: Vibrant Foods

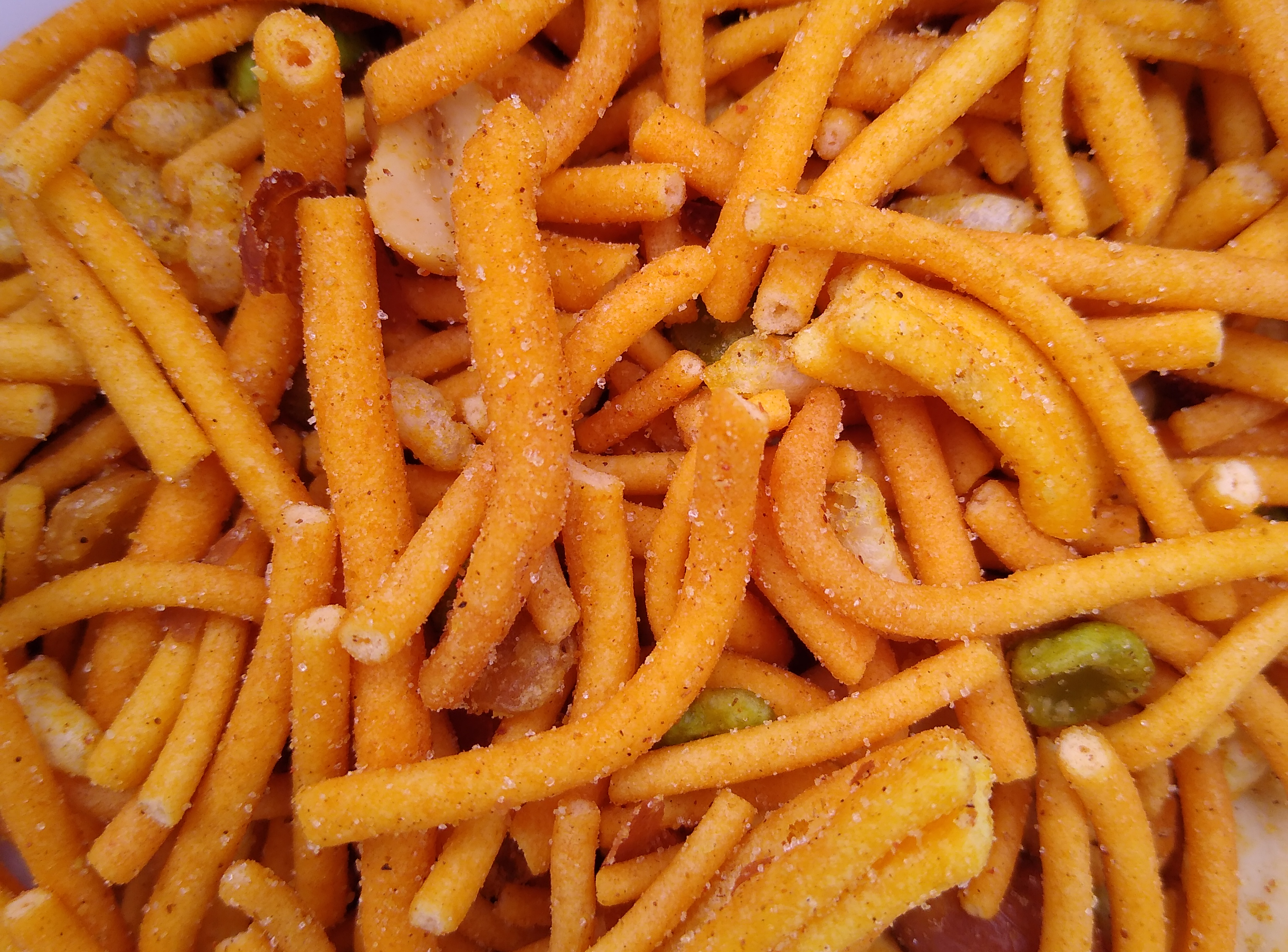
Cofresh Bombay Mix

Cofresh Snack Foods is a manufacturer of savoury snacks based in Leicester, United Kingdom. The company has turnover of £28 million.

The company was founded in 1974 by an Indian family who moved from Kenya to Leicester, and used their fish and chip shop to produce snacks such as Bombay Mix.

In July 2020 Cofresh was acquired by Vibrant Foods who also own TRS Foods and East End Foods.

== Products ==
The core range of Indian snacks includes varieties of poppadum curls, potato grills, spiced nuts, Bombay Mix and Ganthiya.

In 2017 Cofresh launched an "Eat Real" range of gluten-free snacks, predominantly made from hummus, lentils and quinoa.
