= Guthlaxton =

Coordinates: 52.5°N 1.2°W

Guthlaxton is an ancient hundred of Leicestershire. Its jurisdiction was in the south of the county, and covered Lutterworth and Wigston Magna. At the time of the Domesday Book in 1086, it was one of Leicestershire's four wapentakes, and covered a much larger area, including Market Bosworth and Hinckley, which would later be made part of the Sparkenhoe hundred.

The original meeting place of the hundred was at the Guthlaxton stone. The Sparkenhoe hundred was split from Guthlaxton in 1346.

Guthlaxton College in Wigston Magna was named after the hundred. The school was renamed Wigston College in 2015.

In the late 19th century the administrative aspects of most hundreds were given to other specialized governmental divisions.
