= Pub song =

Style of song in British culture

In British popular culture, the "traditional" pub songs typified by the Cockney "knees up" mostly come from the classics of the music hall, along with numbers from film, the stage and other forms of popular music.

The tradition is continued in the United Kingdom by acts such as Chas & Dave and a Tribute to Chas and Dave called Gertcha, many of whose works are in a 'pub song' format.

Typical songs include:

- "Any Old Iron"
- "Daddy Wouldn't Buy Me a Bow Wow"
- "Knees Up Mother Brown"
- "My Old Man's a Dustman"
- "Nellie Dean"
- "Underneath the Arches"
- "Where Did You Get That Hat?"

The term is also commonly used throughout The Commonwealth to refer to well-known songs that may sung communally, often in a pub setting, and often with a Celtic flare. A famous Canadian example is Home For A Rest.

== See also ==
- Drinking song
- List of public house topics
- Pub rock (Australia)
- Pub rock (United Kingdom)
