= East Goscote Hundred =

Coordinates: 52°42′N 00°52′W

East Goscote Hundred was a hundred of Leicestershire, that arose from the division of the ancient Goscote hundred (also known as a Wapentake) into two. It covered the eastern part of today's Charnwood district, along with the northern part of Harborough District, and extended south-east to meet Rutland.

The hundred was created by the sub-division of the Goscote hundred in 1346. A parish in the East Goscote Hundred was Prestwould (later named Prestwold).

Today, the name of the East Goscote Hundred lives on in the 20th century village of East Goscote.
