= Goscote Wapentake =

Wapentake in Leicestershire, England

Coordinates: 52.75°N 1.10°W

Goscote was a wapentake in the county of Leicestershire, England; consisting of the north and north-west of the county. It was recorded in the Domesday Book, but as the wapentakes evolved to form hundreds, was split into East Goscote Hundred and West Goscote Hundred in 1346.
