= Leicestershire =

County of England

- Non-metropolitan and ceremonial county
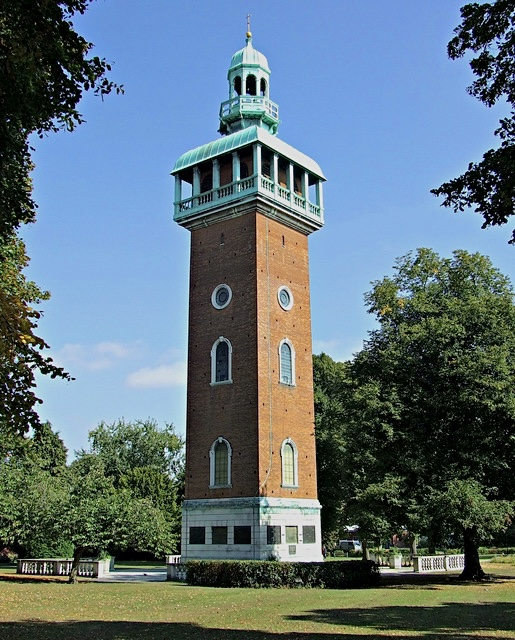
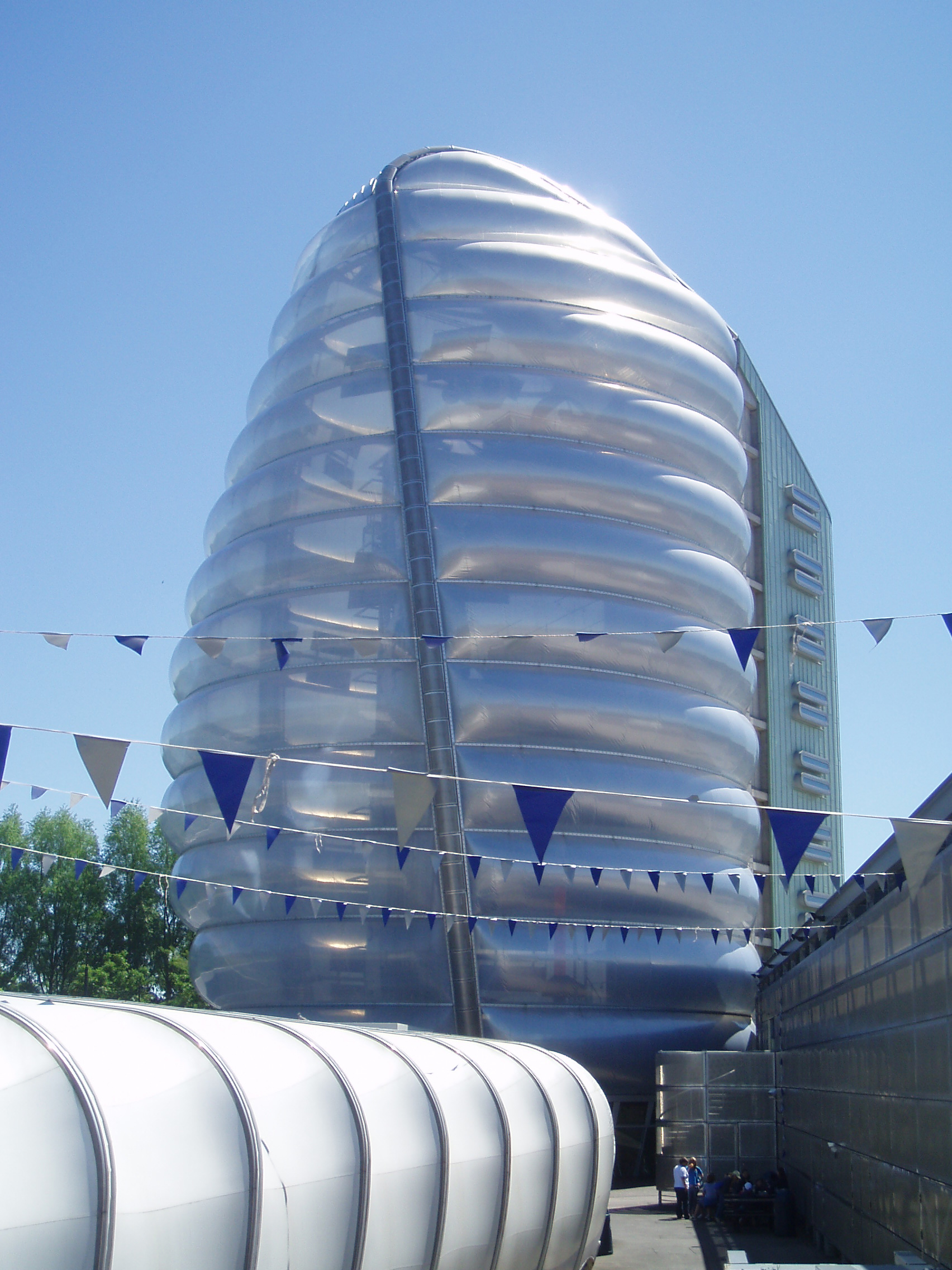
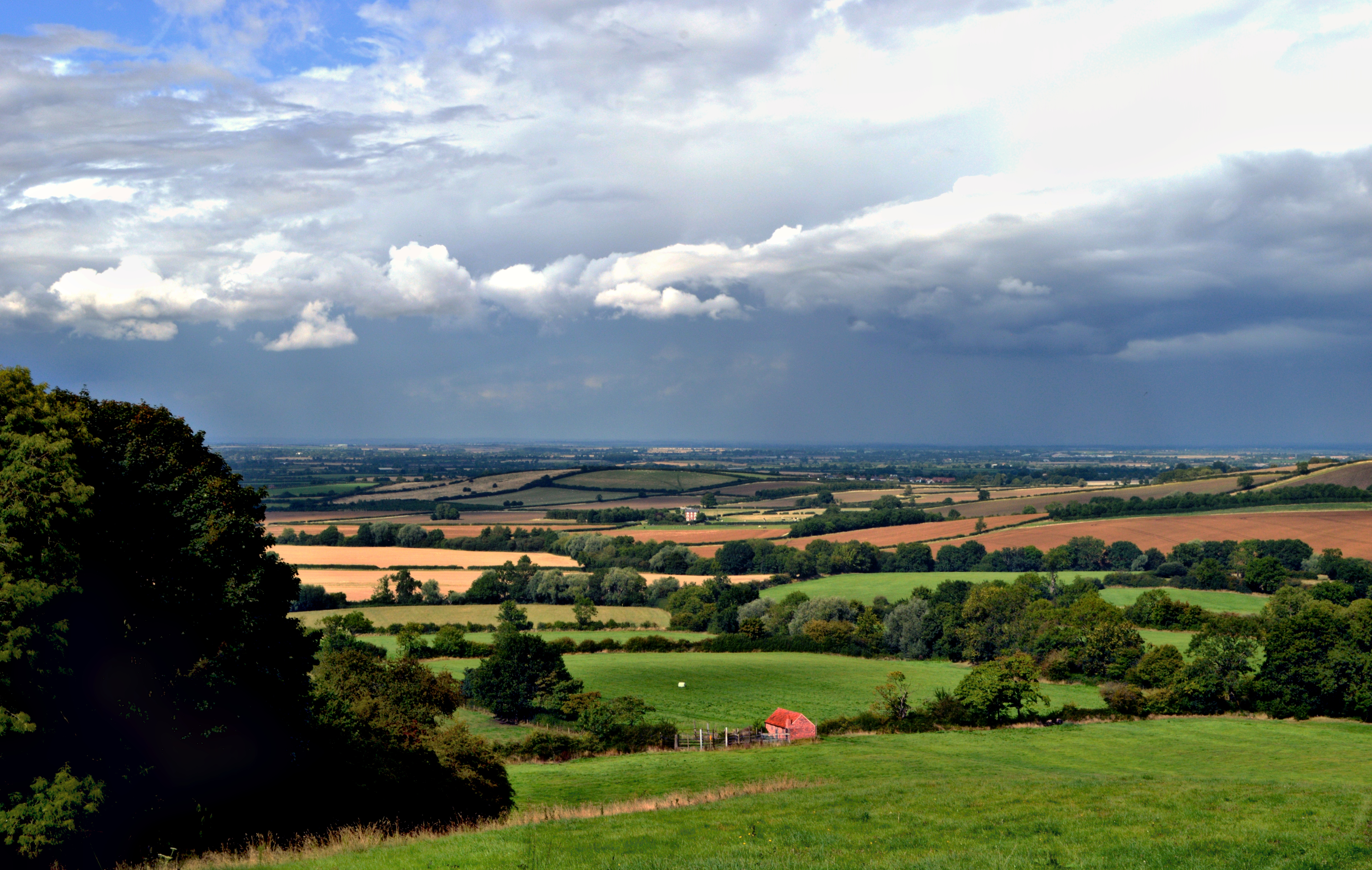
- Loughborough Carillon; the National Space Centre, Leicester; and the Vale of Belvoir near Ab Kettleby

- Leicestershire within England
- Coordinates: 52.656°N 1.19°W
- Sovereign state: United Kingdom
- Constituent country: England
- Region: East Midlands
- Established: Historic
- Time zone: UTC+0 (GMT)
  - Summer (DST): UTC+1 (BST)
- UK Parliament: 10 MPs
- County town and largest city: Leicester
- Ceremonial county
- Lord Lieutenant: Mike Kapur
- High Sheriff: Meldin Thomas
- Area: 2,156 km^{2} (832 sq mi)
  - Rank: 28th of 48
- Population (2024): 1,133,921
  - Rank: 19th of 48
  - Density: 526/km^{2} (1,360/sq mi)
- Non-metropolitan county
- County council: Leicestershire County Council
- Control: No overall control
- Admin HQ: County Hall, Glenfield
- Area: 2,083 km^{2} (804 sq mi)
  - Rank: 15th of 21
- Population (2025): 752,448
  - Rank: 16th of 21
  - Density: 361/km^{2} (930/sq mi)
- ISO 3166-2: GB-LEC
- GSS code: E10000018
- ITL: TLF22
- Website: leicestershire.gov.uk
- Districts
- Districts of Leicestershire; Unitary County council area
- Districts: List: North West Leicestershire; Charnwood; Melton; Harborough; Oadby and Wigston; Blaby; Hinckley and Bosworth; Leicester

Leicestershire (/ˈlɛstərʃɪər, -ʃər/ LEST-ər-sheer, -shər) is a ceremonial county in the East Midlands of England. It is bordered by Derbyshire, Nottinghamshire and Lincolnshire to the north, Rutland to the east, Northamptonshire to the south-east, Warwickshire to the south-west, and Staffordshire to the west. The city of Leicester is the largest settlement.

The county has an area of 2,156 km^{2} (832 sq mi) and an estimated population of 1,133,921 in 2024. Leicester is in the centre of the county and is by far the largest settlement; its urban area includes the towns of Wigston and Oadby immediately to the south-east. The rest of the county is largely rural, and its settlements include the university town of Loughborough in the north, Melton Mowbray in the north-east, Hinckley in the south-west, Market Harborough in the south-east, and Coalville in the north-west. For local government purposes Leicestershire comprises a non-metropolitan county, with seven districts, and the unitary authority area of Leicester.

Leicestershire is generally a lowland county, characterised by small, rolling hills. It is bisected by the River Soar, which rises near the Warwickshire border south of Hinckley and flows north through Leicester and Loughborough before reaching the Trent at the county boundary. To the west of the river is Charnwood Forest, an upland area which contains Bardon Hill, which at 278 m (912 ft) is the county's highest point.

There are prehistoric earthworks in the county, and Leicester was a Roman settlement. The region was settled by the Angles in the sixth century and became part of the Kingdom of Mercia, and the county existed at the time of the Domesday Survey in the 1080s. The county has had a relatively settled existence; however, it was the site of the Battle of Bosworth Field in 1485, which established the Tudor dynasty's position as monarchs of England. During the Industrial Revolution the Leicestershire coalfield in the north and west of the county was exploited. Leicester became known for shoemaking, and with Loughborough continues to be a manufacturing centre. In agriculture the county is known for Stilton cheese and Melton Mowbray pork pies.

== History ==
The Domesday Book (1086) records four wapentakes in the territory of Leicestershire: Guthlaxton, Framland, Goscote and Gartree. These later became hundreds, with the division of Goscote into West Goscote and East Goscote, and the addition of Sparkenhoe hundred. The first recorded use of the county name occurs in 1087 as Lægrecastrescir.

Leicestershire's external boundaries have changed little since the Domesday Survey. The Measham-Donisthorpe exclave of Derbyshire has been exchanged for the Netherseal area, and the urban expansion of Market Harborough has caused Little Bowden, previously in Northamptonshire to be annexed. Until 1969, the county's legal name was "Leicester" rather than "Leicestershire", although the latter form was in common usage. In legal contexts the county was usually referred to as the "County of Leicester" where necessary to distinguish between the city and the county. In 1969 the government formally changed the county's name to "Leicestershire" at the county council's request.

In 1974, the Local Government Act 1972 abolished the county borough status of Leicester city and the county status of neighbouring Rutland, converting both to administrative districts of Leicestershire. These actions were reversed on 1 April 1997, when Rutland and the City of Leicester became unitary authorities. Rutland became a distinct ceremonial county once again, although it continues to be policed by Leicestershire Constabulary.

The symbol of the county council, of the Leicestershire County Cricket Club and of Leicester City FC is a fox. Tradition regards Leicestershire as the birthplace of fox hunting as it is known today. Hugo Meynell (1735-1808), who lived in Quorn, has a reputation as the "father of modern fox-hunting". Melton Mowbray and Market Harborough have associations with fox hunting, as has neighbouring Rutland.

The flag of Leicestershire

The flag of Leicestershire features a fox under an heraldic cinquefoil — both symbols often associated with Leicestershire. The flag design, made official in July 2021, was the last one registered for an historic county of England.

== Geography ==
Location map of Leicestershire and major towns/cities

The River Soar together with its tributaries and canalisations constitutes the principal river basin of the county, although the River Avon and River Welland through Harborough and along the county's southern boundaries are also significant. The Soar rises between Hinckley and Lutterworth, towards the south of the county near the Warwickshire border, and flows northwards, bisecting the county along its north–south axis, through 'Greater' Leicester and then to the east of Loughborough where its course within the county comes to an end. It continues north marking the boundary with Nottinghamshire in the borough of Rushcliffe for some 10 kilometres (6.2 mi) before joining the River Trent at the point where Derbyshire, Leicestershire and Nottinghamshire meet.

The geographical centre of England is in Leicestershire, near Fenny Drayton in the southwest of the county. In 2013, the Ordnance Survey calculated that the point was on land at Lindley Hall Farm. An alternative point at Meriden, around 10 miles (16 km) to the southwest, had been considered the traditional centre for more than 500 years.

A large part of the north-west of the county, around Coalville, forms part of the new National Forest area extending into Derbyshire and Staffordshire. The highest point of the county is Bardon Hill at 278 m (912 ft), which is also a Marilyn; with other hilly/upland areas of around 150–200 metres (490–660 ft) and above in nearby Charnwood Forest and also to the east of the county around Launde Abbey. The lowest point, at an altitude of about 20 metres (66 ft), is located at the county's northernmost tip close to Bottesford where the River Devon flowing through the Vale of Belvoir leaves Leicestershire and enters Nottinghamshire.

== Demographics ==
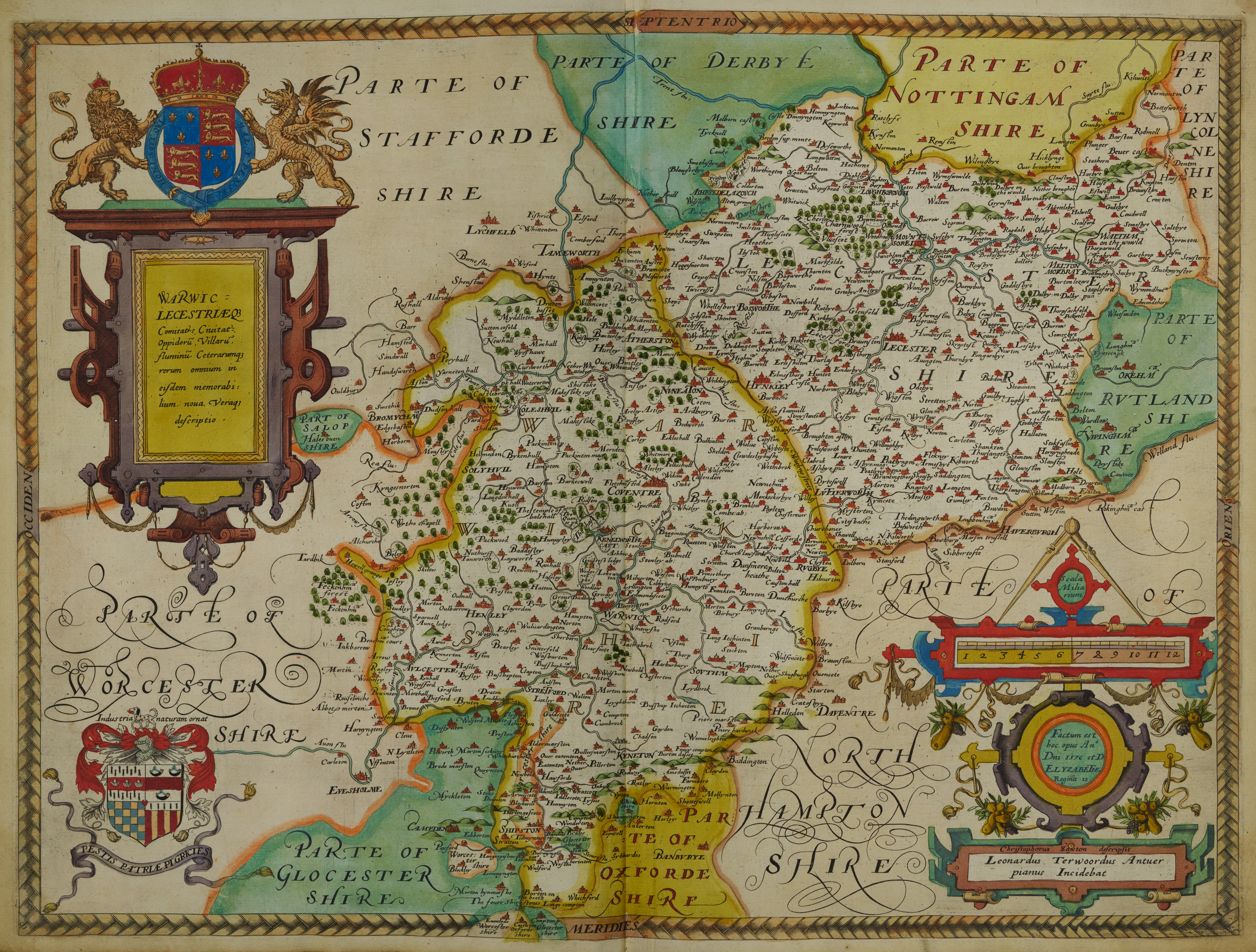
Map of Warwickshire and Leicestershire by Christopher Saxton, 1577

The population of Leicestershire (excluding Leicester Unitary Authority) is 609,578 people (2001 census). The county covers an area of 2,084 km^{2} (805 sq mi). Its largest population centre is the city of Leicester, followed by the town of Loughborough. Other large towns include Ashby-de-la-Zouch, Coalville, Hinckley, Lutterworth, Market Harborough, Melton Mowbray, Oadby, Shepshed and Wigston.

Some of the larger of villages are: Burbage (population estimated around 16,500 in 2014), Birstall (population 11,400 in 2004), Broughton Astley, Castle Donington, Kibworth Beauchamp (along with Kibworth Harcourt), Great Glen, Ibstock, Countesthorpe and Kegworth. One of the most rapidly expanding villages is Anstey, which has seen expansion in almost every decade since the 1950s to the 2020s, with further expansion expected. .

== Economy ==
=== Engineering ===
Engineering has long been an important part of the economy of Leicestershire. John Taylor Bellfounders continues a history of bellfounding in Loughborough since the 14th century. In 1881 John Taylors cast the largest bell in Britain, "Great Paul", for St Paul's Cathedral in London. Norman & Underwood have been making sand cast sheet lead roofing and stained glass since 1825 working on many of England's major cathedrals and historic buildings, including Salisbury Cathedral, Windsor Castle, Westminster Abbey, Hampton Court Palace, and Chatsworth House. There were three coal mines that operated in Coalville from the 1820s until 1986. Abbey Pumping Station houses four enormous steam powered beam engines built in Leicester in the 1890s in the Vulcan factory owned by Josiah Gimson, whose son Ernest Gimson was an influential furniture designer and architect of the English Arts and Crafts movement.

Engineering companies today include sports car makers Noble Automotive Ltd in Barwell and Ultima Sports Ltd in Hinckley, Triumph Motorcycles in Hinckley, Jones & Shipman (machine tools), Caterpillar Redford (Plant machinery), Plant manufacturers Metalfacture Ltd (sheet metal work), Richards Engineering (foundry equipment), Transmon Engineering (materials handling equipment), Trelleborg Industrial AVS in Beaumont Leys (industrial suspension components), Parker Plant (quarrying equipment) in Belgrave which opened in 1911 inside a single railway arch. The business relocated to an 18-acre site in 1926. In the 1950s, 60s and 70s they were employing over 1,400 people to meet demand. In 1969, 1978 and in 1994 the business won the prestigious Queen's Award for Enterprise. In 2006 Universal Conveyors was acquired and in 2007 Phoenix Parker Holdings Ltd was formed. In 2014 Phoenix Transworld, Cartem & Universal Conveyors marketed under the Parker brand. Aggregate Industries UK (construction materials), Infotec in Ashby-de-la-Zouch (electronic information display boards), Alstec in Whetstone, Leicestershire (airport baggage handling systems), and Brush Traction (railway locomotives) in Loughborough. There are also consultancies (including Pick Everard) in Leicestershire supporting engineering and the built environment. Local commitment to nurturing the upcoming cadre of British engineers includes apprenticeship schemes with local companies, and academic-industrial connections with the engineering departments at Leicester University, De Montfort University and Loughborough University.

The Engineering Innovation Centre and Centre for Excellence for low carbon and fuel cell technologies are both based at Loughborough University. Private sector research and development organisations include PERA—the technology based consultancy in Melton Mowbray, and MIRA—the automotive research and development centre based on the outskirts of Hinckley. Automotive and aerospace engineers use the test facilities at Mallory Park, and Bruntingthorpe Aerodrome and proving ground. On 18 October 2007, the last airworthy Avro Vulcan was flown from Bruntingthorpe Aerodrome after 10 years of restoration there by aerospace engineers of the Vulcan Operating Company.

=== Farming ===
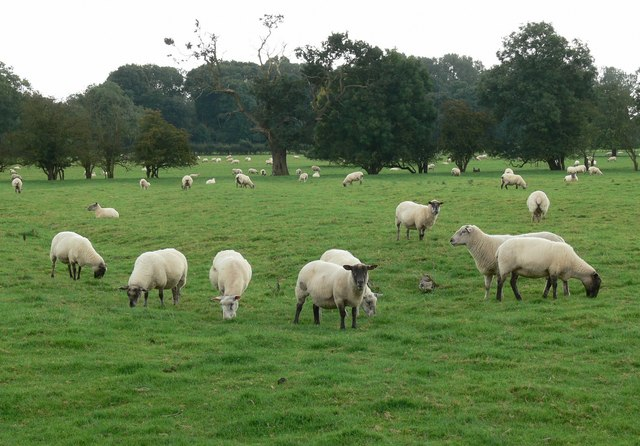
A field of sheep near Stoke Golding

Leicestershire has a long history of livestock farming which continues today. Robert Bakewell (1725–1795) of Dishley, near Loughborough, was a revolutionary in the field of selective breeding. Bakewell's Leicester Longwool sheep was much prized by farmers across the British Empire and is today a heritage breed admired. Commercial and rare breeds associated with the descendants of Bakewell's sheep include the English Leicester, Border Leicester, Bluefaced Leicester, Scotch mule and Welsh halfbred.

The Leicestershire County Show is held on the first Bank Holiday in May each year and includes animal showings, trade exhibitions and show jumping. Melton Mowbray Market is an important regional livestock market.

Field sports remain an important part of the rural economy of Leicestershire, with stables, kennels and gunsmiths based in the county.

=== Food and drink ===
Stilton and Red Leicester cheeses and the pork pie are the three most famous contributions to English cuisine from Leicestershire.

Leicestershire food producers include Claybrooke mill, one of the very few commercially working watermills left in Britain producing a range of over 40 flours; meat from rare and minority breeds from Brockleby's Pies; and Christmas turkey and goose from Seldom Seen Farm. Two dairies produce Red Leicester cheese in the county: Long Clawson, who also produce blue stilton, and the Leicestershire Handmade Cheese Company.

All-natural non-alcoholic fruit cordials and pressed drinks are made by Belvoir Farm and sold in supermarkets across Britain. Swithland Spring Water is sourced from the Charnwood hills. Breweries in Leicestershire and Rutland are listed on the Leicester CAMRA website. The county's largest beer brewer is Everards, and there are several microbreweries.

Various markets are held across the county. Leicester Market, given its Market status in the 13th century, is said to be the largest outdoor covered marketplace in Europe and among the products on sale are fruit and vegetables sold by market stallholders, and fresh fish and meat in the Indoor Market.

The annual East Midlands Food & Drink Festival held in Melton Mowbray had over 200 exhibitors and 20,000 visitors attending in 2007 making it the largest British regional food festival.

Food processing in the city and county includes popular British fish and chip shop pie Pukka Pies who are based in Syston. Walkers Midshire Foods, part of the Samworth Brothers group, makes sausages and pies in its Beaumont Leys factories. Walkers Midshire Foods - Walkers Deli & Sausage Co, part of Samworth Brothers is on the Cobden Street Industrial Estate in Belgrave. The Business specialises in the manufacturing of Premium Sliced Cooked Meats and Sausages as well as being the largest producer of Pate in the UK. Samworth Brothers has operations in Leicestershire and Cornwall (Ginsters), making a range of products from sandwiches to desserts for UK retailers under their brands as well the company's own portfolio of brands including Dickinson & Morris, producers of pork pies and Melton Hunt Cake. Walkers crisps are made in Beaumont Leys using Lincolnshire potatoes. United Biscuits have their distribution centre in Ashby-de-la-Zouch as well as a snacks factory and they also have a biscuit factory in Wigston. The Masterfoods UK factory at Melton Mowbray produces petfood. Hand made chocolates are produced by Chocolate Perfection in Ashby-de-la-Zouch.

15 major Indian food manufacturers are based in Leicester including Sara Foods, Mayur Foods, Cofresh Snack Foods Ltd, Farsan, Apni Roti and Spice n Tice. The 'Mithai' Indian sweet market is catered for by nearby Indian restaurants—for instance, the vegetable samosas approved by the Vegetarian Society sold at The Sharmilee on Belgrave Road AKA the Golden Mile in the Belgrave area of Leicester. The growing market for Indian food has resulted in greater investment by long-standing local companies, for example the Long Clawson dairy, a co-operative manufacturer of Stilton (cheese) now also makes Paneer cheese used in the Indian dish Mattar Paneer.

Leicestershire food exported abroad includes cheese from the Long Clawson dairy, which is sold in supermarkets in Canada and the United States via a network of distributors coordinated by Taunton-based company Somerdale. Belvoir Fruit Farms cordials and pressé drinks are sold on the United States east coast in Wegmans Food Markets, World Market, Harris Teeter, Dean & DeLuca, and in specialised British food stores such as Myers of Keswick (New York City) and the British Pantry (near Washington, D.C.).

=== Clothing ===
Leicester and Leicestershire has had a traditional industry of knitwear, hosiery and footwear, and the sheep on the county's coat of arms is recognition of this. The local manufacturing industry, which began with hand knitting in the Middle Ages, and was fully industrialised by the end of the 19th century, survived until the end of the 20th century through retailers buying UK-sourced products, and government measures such as the protection of the Multi Fibre Arrangement which ended in 2004. Cheaper global competition, coupled with the 1999 slump in the UK fashion retail sector, led to the end of much of the cheaper clothing manufacturing industry. Today Leicestershire companies focus on high quality clothing and speciality textiles.

Other local companies manufacture knitwear such as Commando Knitwear of Wigston, and others specialise in technical textiles for industrial or medical purposes. Clothing and fabric for the British Asian community is made here—for example the shop Saree Mandir sells silk sarees and salwar suits for women whose design patterns closely follow contemporary Indian trends. The Knitting Industries' Federation continues to be based in Leicestershire. On the creative side the design centre for next is headquartered in Enderby, and the design centre for George Clothing (Asda/Walmart) is in Lutterworth. De Montfort University has, in the form of its Fashion and Contour Design course a leading design department for female underwear. It also has the only UK University courses in Footwear Design providing future designers for local shoemakers Shoefayre, Stead and Simpson, and Shoe Zone, who all have their headquarters in the county.

Belgrave-based British United Shoe Machinery, part of a group which for most of the 20th century was the world's largest manufacturer of footwear machinery and materials, exporting shoe machinery to more than 50 countries. In the 1960s and 1970s it was Leicester's biggest employer, employing more than 4,500 locally and 9,500 worldwide. The company had "a respected reputation for technical innovation and excellence", between 1898 and 1960 it developed and marketed nearly 800 new and improved shoe machines and patented more than 9,000 inventions, at one time employing 5% of the UK’s patent agents.

Also Belgrave-based Wolsey, a heritage British clothing brand founded in 1755, making it one of the oldest existing textile companies in the world.

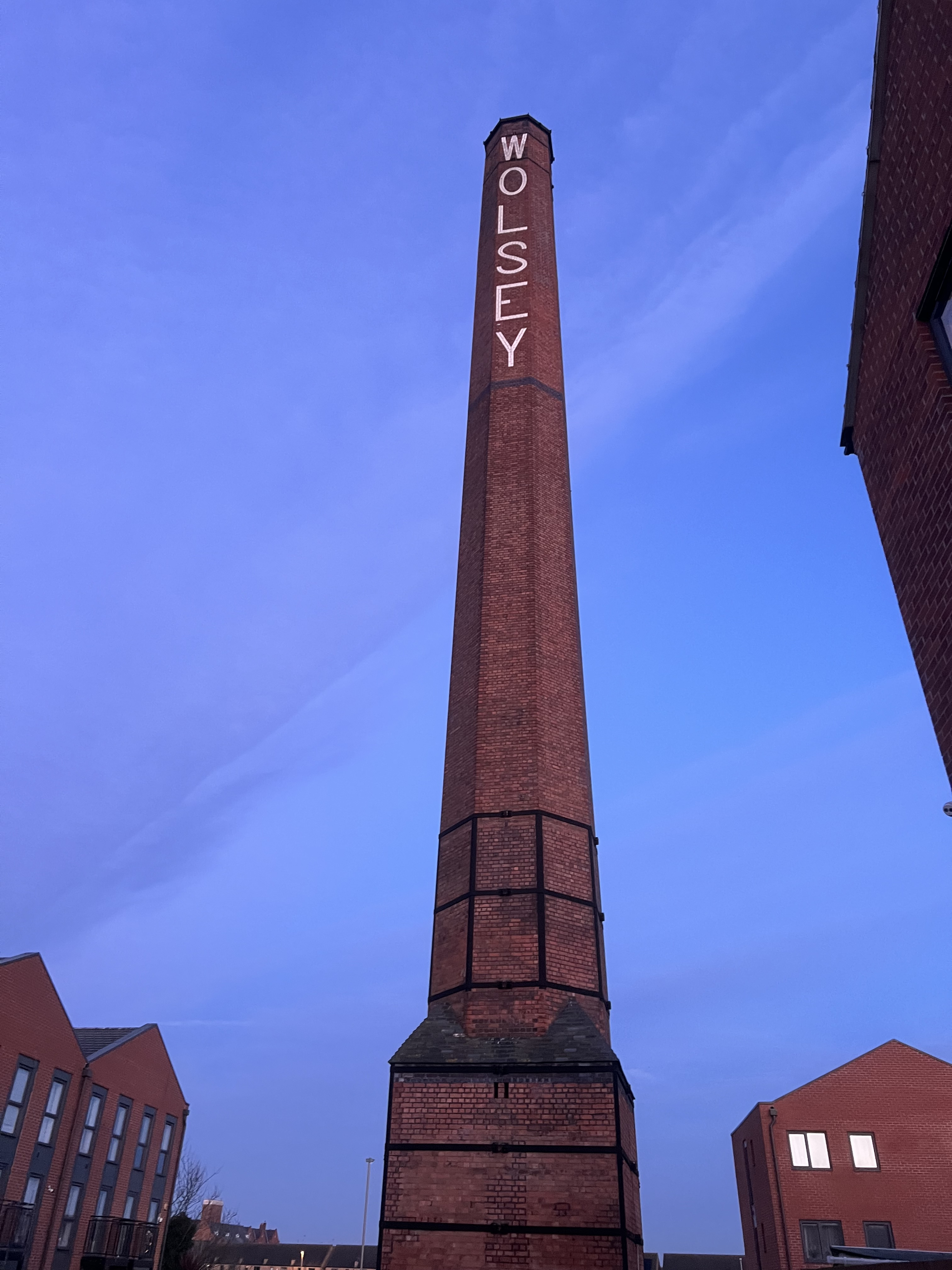
Wolsey Chimney, part of the Hosiery Works, pictured in 2025

Fred Perry also had a Factory in Belgrave.

Gola also originates from the county.

=== Healthcare ===
University Hospitals Leicester NHS Trust employs around 11,000 at its three hospitals in the city and county, the Glenfield, the General and the Royal Infirmary. Leicestershire Partnership NHS Trust employs over 5,500 staff providing mental health, learning disability and community health services in the city and county. These services are commissioned by the three Clinical Commissioning Groups, led by local GPs. The British Psychological Society, the Institution of Occupational Safety and Health (IOSH) based in Wigston, and the National Examination Board in Occupational Safety and Health (NEBOSH) have their head offices in Leicestershire.

=== Biomedical industries ===
Pharmaceutical, biotechnology and medical instrument manufacturing companies include 3M, Bridgehead International in Melton, Fisher Scientific in Loughborough, and Ashfield Healthcare in Ashby-de-la-Zouch.

=== Freight and distribution ===
Transportation links are good. East Midlands Airport is one mile (1.6 km) south of Castle Donington, next to the M1 in north-west Leicestershire, and is the second largest freight airport in the United Kingdom after London Heathrow. DHL Aviation have a large purpose-built facility at EMA, and courier companies UPS and TNT also use the airport as a base. Lufthansa Cargo is also a regular user of East Midlands, and the airport is a primary hub for Royal Mail. The M1 is Leicestershire's other important transport hub. The start of the M6, and part of the A14 briefly intersect with the southern tip of Leicestershire. Many large retail companies have huge warehouses at the Magna Park complex near Lutterworth. The Widdowson Group make use of J21a of the M1 to provide warehousing, transportation, freight forwarding, garage services and LGV/HGV training. Pall-Ex of Ellistown provide automated palletised freight distribution services from their location off Junction 22 of the M1. The Midland Main Line provides important connections to Yorkshire and London, and the Birmingham–Stansted Line is essentially Leicestershire's east–west connection from Hinckley to Melton.

=== Other ===
Ibstock-based developer Wilson Bowden was bought in 2007 by Barratt Developments plc in a £2.2 billion deal. Charles Street Buildings (Leicester) and Jelson Homes are two other successful Leicester-based property companies.

Hamilton-based Sofidel Group manufactures more than 600 million toilet rolls and kitchen towel rolls per year in its Leicestershire factories.

There is a Bostik Factory in Belgrave.

Toy car company Corgi have their European operation at the Meridian Business Park, although the toys are now manufactured in China and the company is owned by Hornby.

Leicestershire is twinned with Kilkenny, Ireland.

Leicester's Cultural Quarter is an ambitious plan to drive the regeneration of a large run-down area of the city. It has delivered: a new venue for the performing arts, Curve; creative workspaces for artists and designers, LCB Depot; and a Digital Media Centre. Many creative and media businesses have thrived in the region.

As part of a 2002 marketing campaign, the plant conservation charity Plantlife chose the foxglove as the county flower.

=== Financial and business services ===
Financial and business service companies with operations in Leicestershire include Alliance & Leicester, Cambridge & Counties Bank, Royal Bank of Scotland, State Bank of India, HSBC and PricewaterhouseCoopers.

Pension provision company Mattioli Woods employs 170 people at its Grove Park, Enderby, HQ and has a reputation for employing graduates directly from Leicestershire Universities.

Companies that have their head office in the area include Next and British Gas Business.

The European Association of Trade Mark Owners and the Point of Purchase Advertising International (POPAI) are based in Leicestershire.

Key stakeholders promoting economic development formed Leicester & Leicestershire Economic Partnership in 2011. Leicestershire Chamber of Commerce is another good source for business advice.

=== Business awards ===
The Leicestershire Business Awards has categories including Investing in Leicestershire, Contribution to the Community, and Entrepreneur of the Year.

Recent Leicestershire winners of the Queen's Award for Enterprise are listed on the Lord Lieutenant's website.

=== Statistics ===
This is a chart of trend of regional gross value added of the non-metropolitan county of Leicestershire and Rutland (it does not include the City of Leicester) at current basic prices published (pp. 240–253) by Office for National Statistics with figures in millions of British Pounds Sterling.

Year	Regional Gross Value Added – components may not sum to totals due to rounding	Agriculture – includes hunting and forestry	Industry – includes energy and construction	Services – includes financial intermediation services indirectly measured
1995	6,666	145	2,763	3,758
2000	7,813	112	2,861	4,840
2003	9,509	142	3,045	6,321

== Governance ==
The coat of arms of Leicestershire County Council, which governs the county other than Leicester

For lieutenancy purposes, Leicestershire consists of the non-metropolitan county and the City of Leicester.

For administrative purposes, most of the county is run by the Leicestershire County Council, though the City of Leicester is run independently by the Leicester City Council. The non-metropolitan county is divided into seven districts ran by district councils: The seven district councils in Leicestershire are Blaby, Charnwood, Harborough, Hinckley & Bosworth, Melton, North West Leicestershire and Oadby & Wigston. It has been proposed by the Leicestershire County Council in 2018 to get rid of the district councils.

Leicestershire County Council consists of 55 elected members, from 52 wards. The most recent election was the May 2017 elections, where all seats were up for re-election. Following these elections the current political composition of the council is 42 Conservatives, 9 Liberal Democrats and 4 Labour councillors.

County Hall, in Glenfield, some 3 miles (4.8 km) north-west of central Leicester and a little over 4 miles (6.4 km) from Leicester railway station, is the seat of Leicestershire County Council and the headquarters of the county authority. Below the County Council, there are seven district councils, Blaby, Charnwood, Harborough, Hinckley and Bosworth, Melton, North West Leicestershire and Oadby and Wigston. The City of Leicester is a unitary authority which is separate from the county for local government, and provides all services in its area; the City Council meets at Leicester Town Hall.

=== Future local government reorganisation ===
In July 2026, the UK Government announced that it intends to reorganise local government in Leicestershire by April 2028. Two unitary authority areas will cover the county. One will include Leicester and its hinterland, an area larger than the current Leicester district, and other will cover the remainder of the county, named Leicestershire and Rutland which will also cover Rutland. Shadow elections to the new unitary authorities will take place in May 2027.

=== Parliamentary constituencies ===
Following the 2024 general election, Leicestershire is represented by eleven members of parliament (MPs). Labour Party won three seats within the City of Leicester in 2019, but ended up losing two, Leicester East was won by Conservative and Leicester South was won by an Independent politician. Labour however gained two seats back in Leicestershire from the Conservatives in Loughborough and North West Leicestershire. The other six Leicestershire seats are represented by Conservative MPs.

General Election 2024: Leicestershire & Rutland
Conservative	Labour	Reform UK	Liberal Democrat	Green	Others	Turnout
173,711 (34.2%) ▼107,308	142,114 (28.0%) ▼27,361	77,889 (15.3%) ▲73,839	49,343 (9.7%) ▼2,263	34,014 (6.7%) ▲15,309	30,875 (6.1%) ▲23,990	507,946 ▼19,476

General Election 2019: Leicestershire & Rutland
Conservative	Labour	Reform UK	Liberal Democrat	Green	Others	Turnout
281,019 (53.3%) ▲21,216	169,475 (32.1%) ▼43,696	4,050 (0.8%)	51,606 (9.8%) ▲16,631	18,705 (3.5%) ▲7,739	6,885 (1.3%) ▼5,572	527,692 ▼3,762

Overall Number of Seats as of 2024
Conservative	Labour	Reform UK	Liberal Democrat	Green	Others
7	3	0	0	0	1 ▲1

== Education ==
Publicly funded secondary schools in Leicestershire are comprehensive. The schools are segregated by age in some areas to ages 10–14 (middle schools), and 14–16 (upper schools) or 14–18 (upper schools which also provide sixth-form education). The schools, compared with other LEAs, have large numbers on the roll with school enrolment often 2,000 and more. For Melton and Blaby districts, although there is division by middle and upper schools, there is only one upper school in either district, giving no choice of school. However, many students of Lutterworth College in Harborough District actually hail from Blaby district.

Charnwood has the largest school population—four times the size of the Melton district. In 2007, the best-performing state school at GCSE was Beauchamp College in Oadby. No comprehensives in Leicestershire LEA were rated as poor performers, unlike in some neighbouring counties. In 2007, 7,800 pupils took GCSE exams.

For A-levels, the best comprehensive school in the county was the De Lisle College in Loughborough. The best schools overall at A-level were the two private single-sex schools in Loughborough—Loughborough Grammar School and Loughborough High School.

=== GCSE results by district council ===
Percentage of pupils gaining 5 grades A–C in 2007 including English and Maths (46.8% was the England average compared to Leicestershire's 48.9%).

- Harborough 56.3
- Oadby and Wigston 55.4
- Hinckley and Bosworth 48.5
- Charnwood 47.9
- North West Leicestershire 46.5
- Melton 41.0
- Blaby 41.0
- (City of Leicester Unitary Authority 36.5)

=== Independent schools ===
Independent senior schools in Leicestershire include Leicester Grammar School (day, co-educational), Leicester High School for Girls (day, girls), Loughborough Grammar School (day and boarding, boys), Loughborough High School (day, girls), Ratcliffe College (day and boarding, co-educational), LGS Stoneygate (day, co-educational) and Dixie Grammar School (day, co-educational).

Loughborough Amherst School (formerly Our Lady's Convent School) was a co-educational day and boarding school located in Loughborough. It closed at the end of the 2024–25 academic year, following financial hardship.

=== Further education ===
There are four general further education colleges operating in Leicestershire; Leicester College, Loughborough College, South Leicestershire College and Stephenson College. All offer various vocational courses as well as apprenticeships and some academic courses.

Brooksby Melton College provides apprenticeships and further education training courses in animal care, countryside, equine, fisheries and land-based service engineering, at their Brooksby campus.

=== Higher education ===
Leicestershire has three universities, the University of Leicester, Loughborough University and De Montfort University.

=== Educational associations ===
Several educational associations have their head offices in Leicestershire, including the Mathematical Association, the Association of School and College Leaders, the Association for College Management, the Girls Schools Association, the National Adult School Association, the National Institute of Adult Continuing Education and the Headmasters & Headmistresses Conference.

=== Sporting associations ===
A number of UK sporting bodies have their head offices in Leicestershire, including the Institute of Sports & Recreation Management, the Institute of Swimming, Volleyball England, the Great Britain Wheelchair Basketball Association, the British Hang Gliding and Paragliding Association, the British Judo Association, the British Parachute Association, the British Triathlon Federation, the Amateur Swimming Association, the British Gliding Association, the British Motorcycle Federation, the English Indoor Bowls Association, the Youth Sport Trust and the British Isles Bowls Council.

== Music ==
The full range of music is performed in the county, from early medieval, European and Asian classical music, folk, jazz, blues, rock and pop. Download Festival, a major hard rock and metal festival, is hosted at Donington Park and 110 Above Festival takes place in the north west of the county near to Twycross.

=== Symphony orchestras ===
The Leicester Symphony Orchestra and the Leicestershire Schools Symphony Orchestra are two of the larger orchestras based in the county. The Philharmonia Orchestra, though based in London, holds annual residencies in Leicester.

=== Amateur orchestras ===
Amateur orchestras include the Leicestershire Sinfonia, Loughborough Orchestra, Charnwood Orchestra, Coalville Light Orchestra and Soar Valley Music Centre Orchestra.

=== Choirs and choral societies ===
Leicester-based choirs include the Leicester Cathedral Choir, Leicester Bach Choir, Broom Leys Choral Society Whitwick, Cantamici, the Cecilian Singers, Charnwood Choral Society, Coalville and District Male Voice Choir, Coro Nostro Chamber Choir, Humberstone Choral Society, Kainé Gospel Choir, Kingfisher Chorale, Leicester Church Music Consort, Leicester City Male Voice Choir, Leicester Philharmonic Choir, Leicestershire Chorale, Loughborough Ladies Choir, Loughborough Male Voice Choir, Meridian Singers, Newtown Linford mixed voice choir, Red Leicester choir, the Scarlet choir, Shepshed Singers, Synergy Community Choir, Wigston and district male voice choir, Unity Community Choir and the Peepul Choir.

=== Early music ===
The Longsdale Consort perform music of the renaissance and baroque periods. Leicester Recorder Society.

=== Music shops ===
Stores selling sheet music and musical instruments in Leicestershire include Music Junkie Ltd, Sona Rupa (Indian), Intasound Music Ltd and MH Music (MH Music are actually in the centre of Market Harborough).

== Media ==
The county is served by BBC East Midlands and ITV Central (East) television regions, with television signals received from the Waltham transmitting station.

The BBC local radio station is BBC Radio Leicester, broadcast from studios in Leicester. Local commercial radio stations serving the county are Capital Midlands, Greatest Hits Radio Midlands, Smooth East Midlands and Hits Radio East Midlands. The community radio stations are Demon FM in Leicester; The Eye serving Melton Mowbray and the Vale of Belvoir; Harborough FM in Market Harborough; and Cross Counties Radio serving Lutterworth.

== Places of interest ==
Key
	Abbey/Priory/Cathedral
Accessible open space	Accessible open space
	Amusement/Theme Park
	Castle
Country Park	Country Park
	English Heritage
	Forestry Commission
Heritage railway	Heritage railway
Historic house	Historic House
Places of Worship	Places of Worship
Museum (free) Museum	Museum (free/not free)
National Trust	National Trust
	Theatre
	Zoo

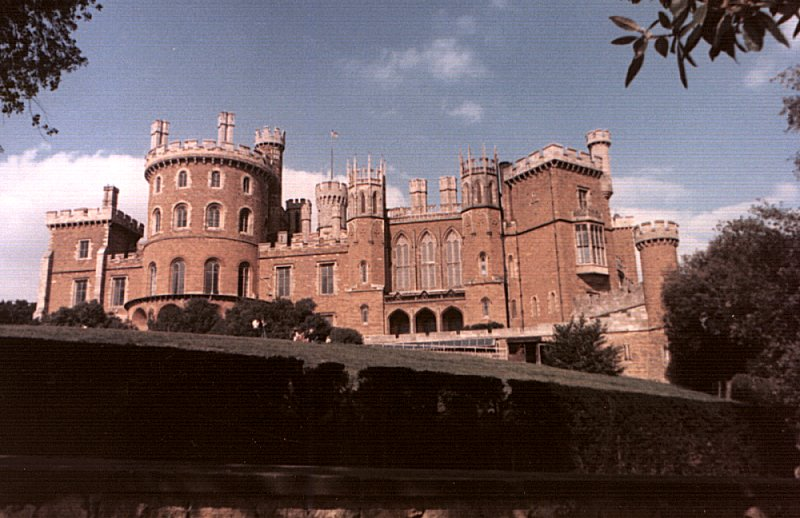
Belvoir Castle today

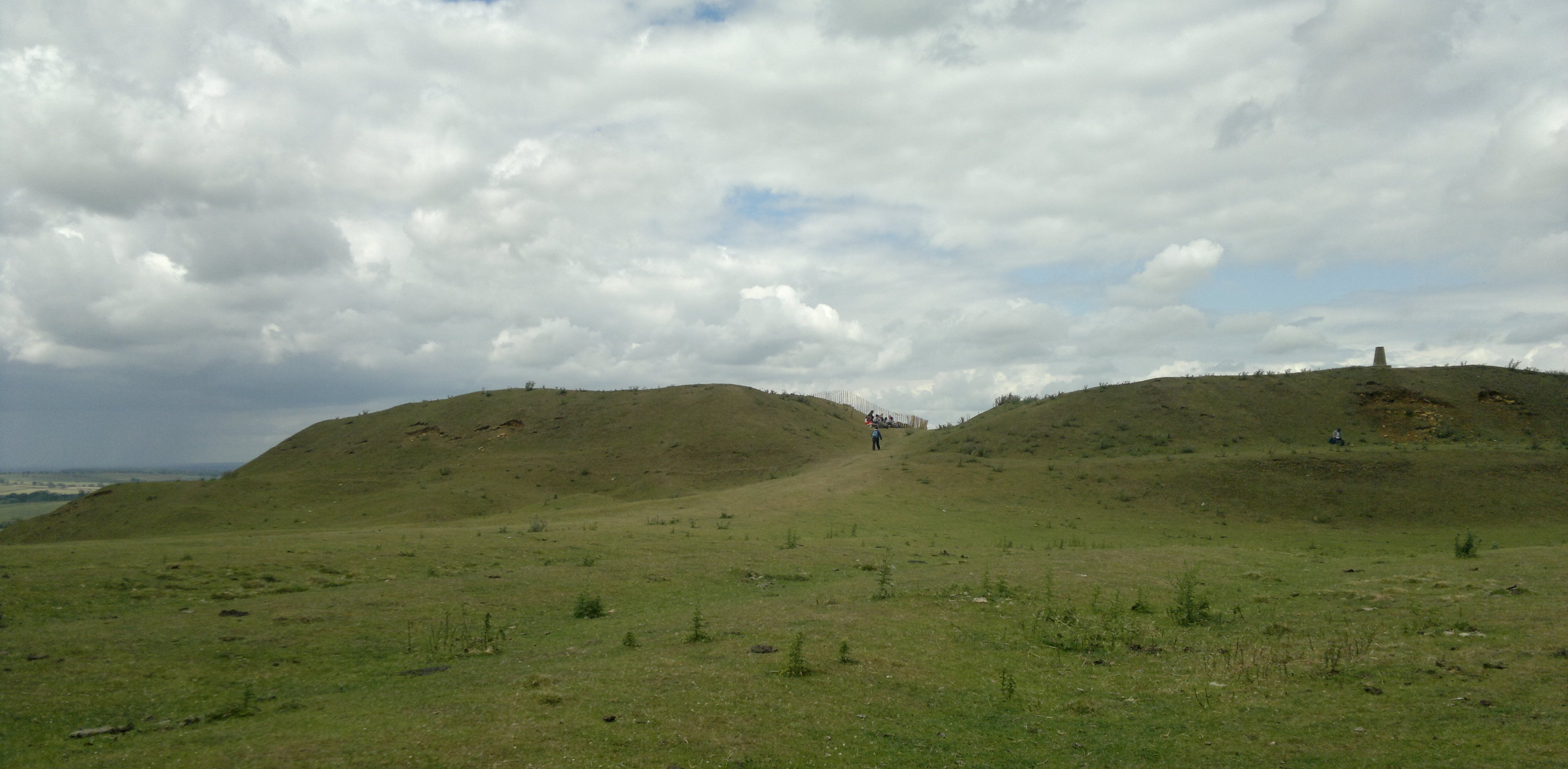
The entrance to Burrough Hill Iron Age hillfort

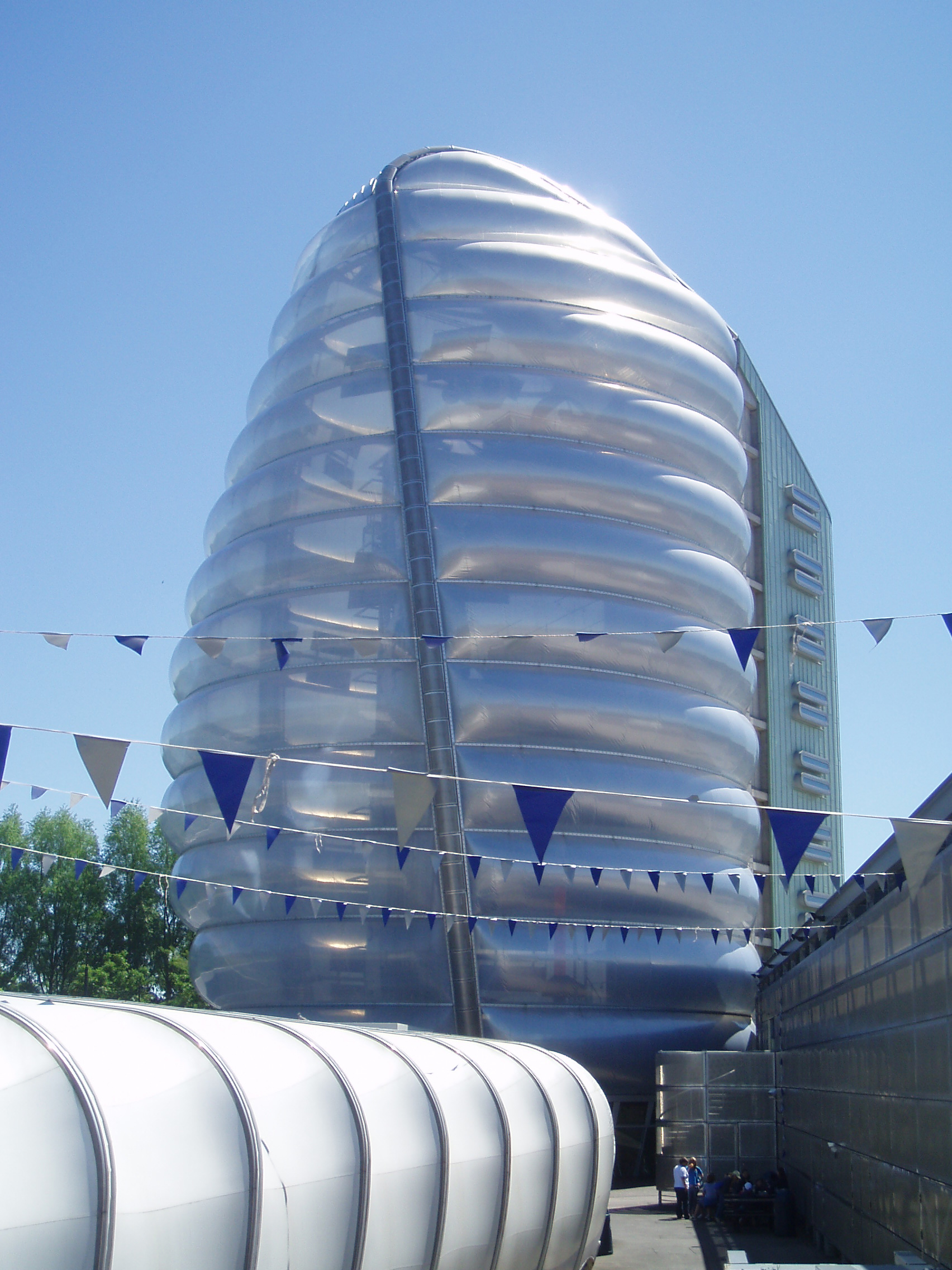
The National Space Centre in Leicester

- Ab Kettleby Manor
- Abbey Pumping Station
- Ashby-de-la-Zouch Canal
- Ashby Castle
- Arnesby May Fayre
- The Battlefield Line
- Beacon Hill
- Beaumanor Hall
- Belgrave Hall & Gardens
- Belvoir Castle
- Bosworth Battlefield
- Bradgate Park
- Brampton Valley Way (former railway path to Northampton)
- Breedon Hill (Iron Age hill fort and Saxon church)
- Bruntingthorpe Aerodrome and proving ground
- Burrough Hill Iron Age Hill Fort
- Charnwood Forest
- Charnwood Museum
- Cold Overton Hall
- Donington le Heath Manor House Museum
- Donington Park and the Donington Grand Prix Collection museum
- East Midlands Airport
- Eyebrook Reservoir
- Fosse Shopping Park
- Foxton Locks
- Great Central Railway (heritage railway)
- Grace Dieu Manor
- Grace Dieu Priory
- Groby Old Hall
- Harborough Museum
- High Cross (Roman settlement)
- Kirby Muxloe Castle
- Launde Abbey
- Leicester Abbey Park
- Leicester Abbey ruins
- Leicester Castle
- Leicester Cathedral
- Leicester Guildhall
- Leicester Jewry Wall Museum
- Leicester New Walk (Regency promenade following the Roman Via Devana)
- Leicester New Walk Museum & Art Gallery
- Lowesby Hall
- Lutterworth (historic market town)
- Lutterworth Church (home of the Lutterworth Wall Paintings)
- Mallory Park
- Market Bosworth (historic market town)
- Market Harborough (historic market town)
- Melton Mowbray (historic market town)
- Melton Carnegie Museum
- Moira Furnace
- Mount St. Bernard Abbey
- National Space Centre
- The National Forest and Conkers
- Nevill Holt Hall
- Newark Houses Museum
- Quenby Hall
- Quorn Hall
- Shenton Hall
- Snibston Discovery Museum
- Stanford Hall
- Stoney Cove the National Diving Centre
- Stoneywell
- Stapleford Miniature Railway
- Stapleford Park
- Swithland Reservoir
- Swithland Wood
- Twinlakes Theme Park
- Twycross Zoo
- Ulverscroft Priory
- University of Leicester Botanic Garden
- Watermead Country Park
- Wigston Framework Knitters Museum
- Wistow Hall

== See also ==
- Centre points of the United Kingdom
- Custos Rotulorum of Leicestershire – List of keepers of the Rolls
- High Sheriff of Leicestershire
- Leicestershire (UK Parliament constituency) – Historical list of MPs for the Leicestershire constituency
- Leicestershire and Rutland Fire and Rescue Service
- Leicestershire Police
- Leicestershire Police and Crime Commissioner
- List of birds of Leicestershire and Rutland
- List of English and Welsh endowed schools (19th century)#Leicestershire
- List of people from Leicester and Leicestershire
- Lord Lieutenant of Leicestershire
- University Hospitals of Leicester NHS Trust
