= List of settlements in Leicestershire by population =

Map showing the 10 largest settlements within Leicestershire.
Map showing the 11th to 15th largest settlements within Leicestershire.
- EN is Enderby & Narborough
- LFEKM is Leicester Forest East & Kirby Muxloe
- BW is Blaby & Whetstone
- EMA is East Midlands Airport
Map showing the 16th to 20th largest settlements within Leicestershire.

Below is a list of settlements in Leicestershire (including the City of Leicester) by population

== 2021 ==
In the 2021 UK census, the ONS places had a single definition, built-up area.

#	Settlement	District	Population
I	Leicester	Leicester	406,580
II	Loughborough	Charnwood	64,860
III	Hinckley	Hinckley and Bosworth	50,725
IV	Wigston	Oadby and Wigston	34,730
V	Melton Mowbray	Melton	27,450
VI	Market Harborough	Harborough	24,165
VII	Oadby	Oadby and Wigston	24,030
IIX	Coalville	North West Leicestershire	21,980
IX	Ashby-de-la-Zouch	North West Leicestershire	15,120
X	Shepshed	Charnwood	14,870
XI	Birstall	Charnwood	14,315
XII	Blaby & Whetstone	Blaby	14,080
XIII	Leicester Forest East & Kirby Muxloe	Blaby	13,850
XIV	Syston	Charnwood	13,620
XV	Enderby & Narborough	Blaby	13,180
XVI	Mountsorrel	Charnwood	12,885
XVII	Earl Shilton	Hinckley and Bosworth	10,885
XVII	Lutterworth	Harborough	10,520
XIIX	Broughton Astley	Harborough	9,650
XIX	Sileby	Charnwood	8,955
XX	Countesthorpe	Blaby	7,670
XXI	Castle Donington	North West Leicestershire	7,345
XXII	Kibworth Beauchamp & Kibworth Harcourt	Harborough	7,330
XXII	Anstey	Charnwood	7,045
XXIII	Barrow upon Soar	Charnwood	6,820
XXIV	Ibstock	North West Leicestershire	6,810
XXV	Groby	Charnwood	6,560
XXV	Quorndon	Charnwood	5,575
XXVI	Measham	North West Leicestershire	5,370

== 2001 and 2011 ==
Based on the results of the 2011 census, where the population exceeded 2,000 (52 settlements). In the 2001 census and 2011 census, the ONS places had wider (urban area in 2001 and built-up area in 2011) and lesser (built-up area subdivision in 2011) definitions.

Rank	Built-up area	Population		UA/borough/district	Local areas included and excluded
Rank	Built-up area	2001	2011	UA/borough/district	Local areas included and excluded
1	Leicester^{*}	330,574 (279,921)	443,760 (329,839)	City of Leicester (UA) Oadby and Wigston; Blaby, Charnwood, Harborough: parts	The makeup of the Leicester area figures is shown at the Leicester Built-Up Area article. Figures in brackets are the population of the city council (Unitary Authority/UA) area.
2	Loughborough^{*}	55,258	59,932	Charnwood	Includes Dishley, Nanpantan, Snell's Nook, Shelthorpe, Thorpe Acre. Excludes Cotes, Hathern, Woodthorpe
3	Hinckley^{*}	43,246	45,249	Hinckley and Bosworth	Includes Burbage, Hollycroft, Middlefield, Sketchley. Excludes Aston Flamville, Wykin
4	Wigston^{*}	33,116	⤴︎	Oadby and Wigston	Included within Leicester's figure in 2011
5	Coalville^{*}	31,884	34,024	North West Leicestershire	Includes Agar Nook, Donington le Heath, Greenhill, Hugglescote, Thringstone, Whitwick. Excludes Abbots Oak, Bardon, Coleorton, Ellistown, Grace-Dieu, Griffydam, Newbold, Osgathorpe, Peggs Green, Ravenstone, Sinope, Snibston, Swannington
6	Melton Mowbray^{*}	25,554	27,158	Melton	Includes New Guadaloupe. Excludes Asfordby, Brentingby, Burton Lazars, Eye Kettleby, Old Guadaloupe, Thorpe Arnold, Welby
7	Market Harborough^{*}	20,127	22,911	Harborough	Includes Great Bowden, Little Bowden. Excludes East Farndon and Lubenham
8	Oadby	22,679	⤴︎	Oadby and Wigston	Included within Leicester's figure in 2011
9	Earl Shilton	18,366	19,069	Hinckley and Bosworth	Includes Barwell. Excludes Elmesthorpe
10	Narborough^{*}/ Enderby	12,996	14,119	Blaby	Excludes Croft, Littlethorpe, Huncote, Thurlaston
11	Shepshed	12,882	13,505	Charnwood	Includes Finney (Fenney) Hill and the Iveshead Road area. Excludes Blackbrook, Oaks in Charnwood
12	Syston	11,508	12,804	Charnwood	Excludes Barkby, East Goscote, Queniborough
13	Whetstone	6,100	12,760(⇮)	Blaby	2011 figure includes Blaby Village. Excludes Cosby
14	Ashby-de-la-Zouch	11,409	12,370	North West Leicestershire	Includes Cliftonthorpe and Rotherwood. Excludes Annswell, Blackfordby, Lount, Moira, Packington, Shellbrook, Smisby, Willesley
15	Birstall	11,480	12,216	Charnwood	Included within Leicester's figure in 2011
16	Mountsorrel	11,306	12,120	Charnwood	Includes Rothley. Excludes Cropston, Swithland
17	Lutterworth	8,752	9,907	Harborough	Includes Bitteswell. Excludes Cotesbach, Misterton
18	Broughton Astley	8,290	8,940	Harborough	Includes Primethorpe. Excludes Sutton in the Elms
19	Sileby	7,103	8,433	Charnwood	Includes Cossington. Excludes Seagrave
20	Groby	6,256	6,782	Charnwood	Excludes Glenfield, Ratby
21	Anstey	5,821	6,528	Charnwood	Excludes Newtown Linford
22	Castle Donington	5,977	6,416	North West Leicestershire	Includes Hill Top. Excludes Hemington, Lockington
23	Countesthorpe	6,393	6,377	Blaby	Excludes Kilby
24	Blaby Village	6,163	⇮	Blaby	See Whetstone for 2011
25	Ibstock	5,760	6,201	North West Leicestershire	Excludes Heather
26	Barrow-upon-Soar	5,083	5,956	Charnwood	
27	Kibworth Harcourt	4,788	5,433	Harborough	Includes Kibworth Beauchamp. Excludes Carlton Curlieu, Fleckney, Smeeton Westerby, Tur Langton
28	Measham	4,849	5,209	North West Leicestershire	Excludes Snarestone
29	Quorn	4,961	5,177	Charnwood	Excludes Woodhouse, Woodthorpe
30	Markfield	4,969	4,993	Hinckley and Bosworth	Includes Field Head, Little Markfield, Upper Grange. Excludes Stanton under Bardon
31	Fleckney^{^{†}}	4,610	4,894	Harborough	Excludes Saddington, Wistow
32	Kirby Muxloe	4,523	4,667	Blaby	
33	Ratby^{^{†}}	3,862	4,468	Hinckley and Bosworth	
34	Desford^{^{†}}	3,676	3,930	Hinckley and Bosworth	Includes Botcheston and Newtown Unthank
35	Stoney Stanton^{^{†}}	3,454	3,793	Blaby	
36	Moira/Norris Hill^{^{†}}	3,496	3,763	North West Leicestershire	Ashby Woulds parish count. Includes Albert Village, Boothorpe, Littleworth, Spring Cottage
37	Great Glen^{^{†}}	3,220	3,662	Harborough	
38	Kegworth^{^{†}}	3,338	3,601	North West Leicestershire	
39	Bottesford^{^{†}}	3,436	3,587	Melton	
40	Cosby^{^{†}}	3,647	3,506	Blaby	
41	Asfordby^{^{†}}	3,107	3,286	Melton	Includes Ashfordby Hill, Ashfordby Valley, Welby
42	Newbold Verdon^{^{†}}	3,193	3,012	Hinckley and Bosworth	Includes Brascote and Newbold Heath
43	East Goscote^{^{†}}	2,809	2,866	Charnwood	
44	Donisthorpe^{^{†}}	2,336	2,637	North West Leicestershire	Includes Oakthorpe
45	Ellistown^{^{†}}	2,106	2,626	North West Leicestershire	Includes Battleflat
46	Bagworth^{^{†}}	1,836	2,605	Hinckley and Bosworth	Includes Thornton
47	Harby^{^{†}}	2,428	2,577	Melton	Includes Hose and Long Clawson
48	Sapcote^{^{†}}	2,257	2,442	Blaby	
49	Queniborough^{^{†}}	2,257	2,326	Charnwood	
50	Woodhouse^{^{†}}	2,013	2,319	Charnwood	Includes Woodhouse Eaves
51	Ravenstone^{^{†}}	2,149	2,212	North West Leicestershire	Includes parts of Sinope, Snibston
52	Market Bosworth^{^{†}}	1,906	2,097	Hinckley and Bosworth	
53	Cropston^{^{†}}	2,076	2,074	Charnwood	Includes Thurcaston

Notes:

- The Office of National Statistics (ONS) subdivide built-up areas into sectors which do not respect administrative or political boundaries. If those areas have a strong city/town/village identity, for population purposes they are classed into a distinct area.
- Leicester in particular will include population counts from suburbs which are not within the city boundaries – but are close enough to be counted together.
- * – District HQ location.
- ^{†} – Civil parish population figure.

== See also ==
- List of places in Leicestershire
- List of civil parishes in Leicestershire
- Leicester Built-Up Area
- List of Northamptonshire settlements by population
- List of settlements in Rutland by population
- NUTS statistical regions of the United Kingdom
