= Kilby (disambiguation) =

Kilby is a village and civil parish in Leicestershire, England.

Kilby may also refer to:

== Places ==
- Kilby Bridge, a hamlet in Leicestershire, England
- Kilby Correctional Facility, a prison in Alabama, United States
- Kilby Island and Kilby Reef, places in Antarctica
- Kilby Provincial Park, a park in British Columbia, Canada

== Other uses ==
- Kilby (name)
- Kilby International Awards, a high-technology educational foundation
