= Fleckney =

Village in Leicestershire, England

Coordinates: 52.535271°N 1.044141°W

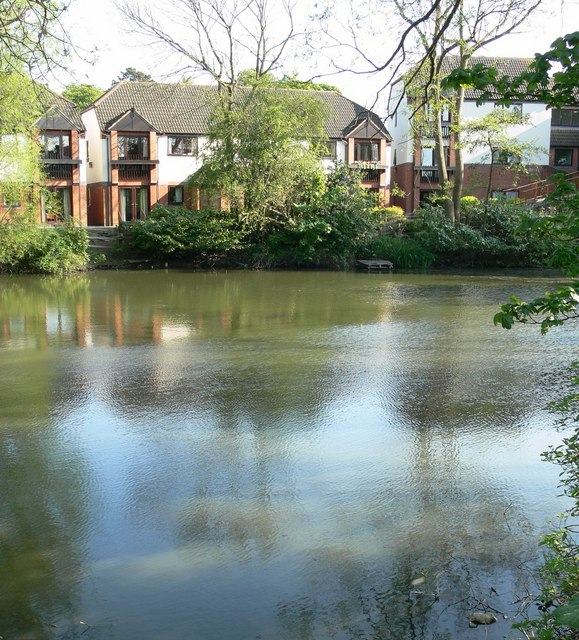
- Fleckney duck pond in April 2007

- Location within Leicestershire
- Area: 1.961 sq mi (5.08 km^{2})
- Population: 4,894 (2011)
  - Density: 2,496/sq mi (964/km^{2})
- OS grid reference: SP651933
  - London: 81 mi (130 km)
- District: Harborough
- Shire county: Leicestershire
- Region: East Midlands
- Country: England
- Sovereign state: United Kingdom
- Post town: LEICESTER
- Postcode district: LE8
- Dialling code: 0116
- Police: Leicestershire
- Fire: Leicestershire
- Ambulance: East Midlands
- UK Parliament: Harborough

Fleckney /ˈflɛkniː/ is a village and civil parish in the Harborough district of Leicestershire, England. It is situated 2.5 miles (4 km) west of the A6 national route between Market Harborough and Leicester.

The village appeared in the Domesday Book and remained a small farming community until the 19th century, which saw development of industry: initially bricks and later hosiery. The historic village centre is a hub of amenities for the mostly rural local area.

== Facilities ==
Much of the surrounding area is composed of small agricultural communities with few amenities, leading Fleckney to be defined by the local council as a rural centre, benefiting from two general practitioner surgeries, a public library, two public houses, primary school, several food shops and a post office. The local newspaper, The Fleckney Communicata, is offered free to local residents.

Much of the adult population commutes, although there is a significant industrial estate in the south of the village. More than 21% of the village population is 0–15 years old, making Fleckney one of the youngest villages in Harborough District. The village has a local primary school, while older pupils attend school at Kibworth High School. Leicester Grammar School, an independent secondary school, moved to the neighbouring village of Great Glen in 2007.

== History and geography ==
The village's name probably means 'island of Flecca', though this is uncertain and 'hurdle island' has also been suggested.

Mentioned as Flechenie in the Domesday Book as the location of just three households, the old factory buildings at the edge of the village are the remains of the 19th century brickworks and later hosiery factories. Decorative bricks in the Barlow shed of St Pancras railway station were produced in Fleckney. After the Second World War, successive developments of new housing were constructed radiating north and south from the historic village centre towards the parish boundaries. Due to severe storms in 2012, the village church suffered roof damage. This was repaired with the donation of a semi-retired local builder, among others.

The village occupies a generally flat area among gently rolling hills in Leicestershire. The Grand Union Canal traverses the eastern edge of the parish from north to south via the Kibworth Locks and the Saddington tunnel.

In the parish, a few hundred metres east of the village is Mill Field Wood also known as Millennium Wood, planted in 2000 as a millennium project. The 18.9 acres (7.6 ha) were bought by the Woodland Trust and villagers of Fleckney and those surrounded planted its trees. The bulk of trees planted were oak, ash, silver birch and field maple; shrubs planted were chiefly hazel and blackthorn, diverse native species.

The pond in the centre of the village has many ducks and was originally a clay or brickearth pit, a relic of 19th century brickmaking. The pond drains in to Fleckney Brook, a tributary of the River Sence which by way of the rivers Soar, Trent and estuarine Humber (noted for Hull) runs relatively directly in to the North Sea. Despite the sea at The Wash being 56 miles (90 km) away, these thus run from here more than 100 miles (160 km) to reach the cusp of the estuary at Cleethorpes.

To the east is the slightly larger village of Kibworth and adjoining Smeeton Westerby; to the south and separated by a narrow tract of agricultural land is the hilltop village of Saddington; while to the north and east are the parishes of Newton Harcourt, Kilby, Wistow and Arnesby.

== Transport ==
=== Roads ===
Fleckney is centred 6 miles east of the M1 motorway and is equidistant between two parallel sections of the north–south A6 and A5199 (former A50) trunk roads.

=== Buses ===
Arriva Midlands operate service 49 into Leicester via Wigston and Centrebus operate service 44 to Foxton via Saddington, Kibworth Beauchamp, The Langtons, Great Bowden & Market Harborough.

=== Rail ===
The nearest railway station is at South Wigston (6 miles), since late 20th century service reductions little used, as at 2017 having far fewer than one train per hour in each direction; no direct service to London; it lacks a car park and many facilities. Railway stations with car parks and many facilities are in Leicester and Market Harborough, centred 10 miles from the village — having direct travel to London St Pancras station and destinations in and near Nottingham, York and beyond to the north. Leicester also sees east–west services linking Fleckney to destinations such as Birmingham and Norwich.

== Sport ==
The Village Cricket side was formed in 1975, and have two Saturday sides that play in the Leicestershire and Rutland Cricket League, they play all home games at the Fleckney Sports Ground

The Village also has a men's vets football team playing alternate Saturdays against other local teams from the city and county.
