= Great Glen, Leicestershire =

Village in Leicestershire, England

Coordinates: 52.57139°N 1.03499°W

Great Glen: Great Glenn or Glenn Magna
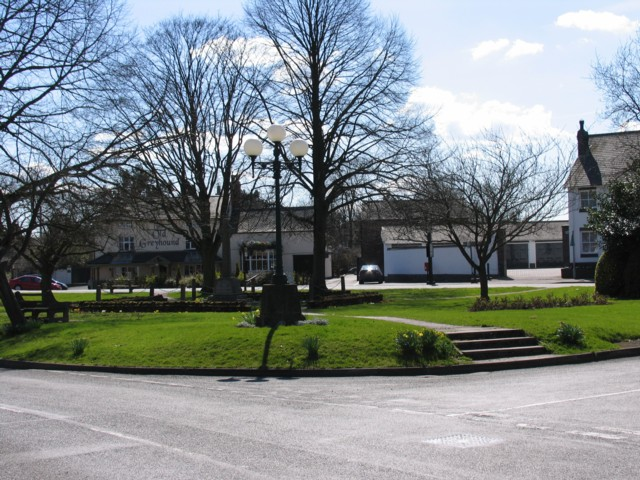
- Great Glen village green and Old Greyhound coaching inn

- Location within Leicestershire
- Population: 4,058 (2021 UK census)
- OS grid reference: SP655975
- Civil parish: Great Glen
- District: Harborough
- Shire county: Leicestershire
- Region: East Midlands
- Country: England
- Sovereign state: United Kingdom
- Post town: LEICESTER
- Postcode district: LE8
- Dialling code: 0116
- Police: Leicestershire
- Fire: Leicestershire
- Ambulance: East Midlands
- UK Parliament: Harborough, Oadby and Wigston

Great Glen (historically known as Great Glenn or Glenn Magna) is a village and civil parish in the Harborough district of Leicestershire, England. It is 2 miles south of Oadby and about seven miles south-east of Leicester. The population of the civil parish at the 2011 census was 3,662. Its name comes from the original Iron Age settlers who used the Celtic word glennos, meaning "valley", and comes from the fact that Great Glen lies in part of the valley of the River Sence. The "Great" part is to distinguish the village from Glen Parva.

== Features and amenities ==
In 1751 a turnpike bridge was built over the River Sence as a part of the stagecoach route from Leicester to London. The pubs The Italian Greyhound and The Crown were originally coaching inns built soon after the new road opened. This road later became the A6 road, and a bypass around the village was opened in 2003. The Midland Main Line runs to the south of the A6, and formerly had a station to serve the village at the closest point.

Leicester Grammar School is constructed on the land of Mount Farm, Great Glen.

There are two other schools in the village, the C of E St Cuthbert's primary school, which feeds to the local state schools in the neighbouring village of Kibworth and the town of Market Harborough. The independent school, The Stoneygate School, also has its site at Great Glen. Its pupils won Best Junior Choir at BBC Songs of Praise 2005 School Choirs Contest

The village park, The Recreation Ground on Bindleys Lane is the home of two of the village's sports clubs:

- Glen Villa Football Club
- Great Glen Cricket Club.

There are two churches in the village. The medieval parish church is dedicated to Cuthbert and sits at the southwestern corner of the village. At the centre of the village on the Stretton Road/Oaks Road T-junction is Great Glen Methodist Church, a Grade II* listed building built in 1827. View the church at Google Maps

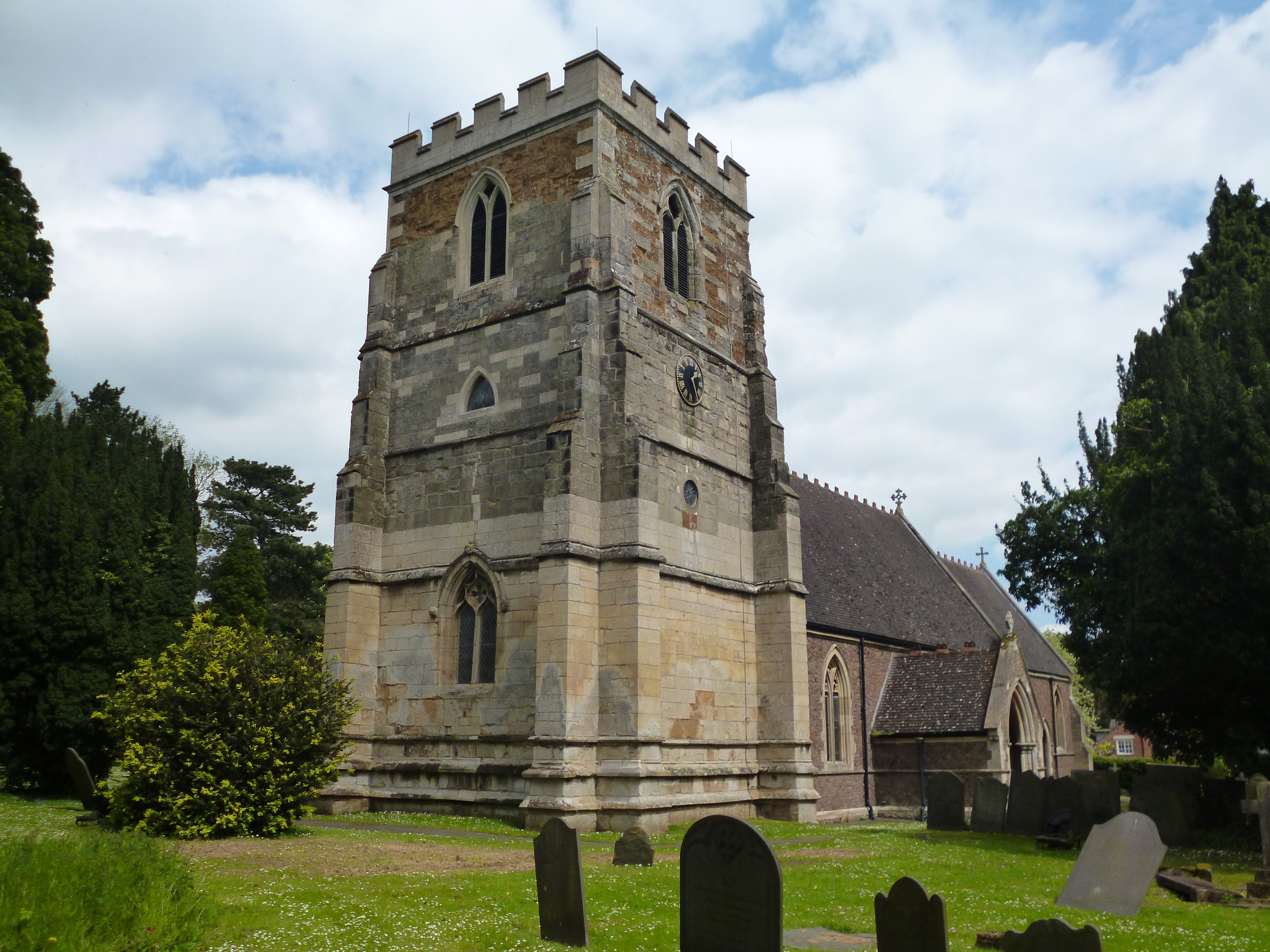
The medieval parish church, dedicated to St Cuthbert

The village is serviced by a Post Office and a Co-op store.

The K6 Red telephone box on the village green is a listed building.

Footballer Trevor Benjamin used to live here, and Engelbert Humperdinck has a home in the village.

=== Stretton Hall ===
Stretton Hall was built in the early 18th century, and though named after Stretton Magna it lies in Great Glen parish. It was built as the manor house of the lordship of Stretton, by, or for, the Hewett family: it was the English residence of Colonel William Hewett (1693–1766), friend of the famous Marquess of Granby, of the novelist Laurence Sterne, and of the eccentric John Hall-Stevenson and his "Club of Demoniacs". Hewett set acorns all over his estate to create a plantation of oaks, some of which were disposed to form a double colonnade like that in front of St Peter's in Rome. These obtained a gold medal from the Society of Arts.

Leicestershire and Rutland Joint Board for the Mentally Defective bought the hall in 1932 for conversion to a hospital. Under the NHS it was a residential hospital for learning disabled children and had 157 beds in 1979. The hospital closed in the 1990s and a housing development has been built on part of the site.

== History ==
Great Glen was the central place of an early Anglo-Saxon multiple estate. The settlements that comprised this estate are: Great and Little Stretton, Wistow, Newton Harcourt, Fleckney and Kilby. These parishes comprise the minimal extent of the estate which broadly follow the River Sence, Glen itself possibly taking its name from an earlier British river-name Glen or from Glennos meaning valley. It is possible that the estate extended further west along the river to Glen Parva where it joins the River Soar. It has not been possible to establish this securely. Glen (as at glenne, not Great Glen) enters the record for the first time in AD 849, when Alhhun, bishop of Worcester tarried there with nine of his clerics to issue a charter granting lands in Worcestershire to King Beorhtwulf of Mercia.

The medieval manorial history of Glen is outlined by John Nichols in his History of Leicestershire. In the 16th century, Henry Grey, 1st Duke of Suffolk, father of Lady Jane Grey, became the lord of the manor. After his execution for treason, his lands were seized by the crown.

Following the Battle of Naseby in 1645, during the English Civil War, Great Glen played host to a band of Cromwellian soldiers who were pursuing some of the (defeated) Royalist Cavalry. They were later joined by the rest of the army who camped overnight before moving onto Leicester. Some of these soldiers made camp in the church where they caused much damage (such as breaking all the windows), of which some evidence can still be seen today. There are five road names in the village that mark these events: Cromwell Road, Naseby Way, Ruperts Way, Edgehill Close and Halford Close.

In 1760 two elderly ladies of the village accused one another of witchcraft and were subjected to the ducking stool, which one passed and the other failed. A number of women were accused as locals grew increasingly concerned and mass hysteria spread. The only court proceedings to arise were fines for rioting as the crime of witchcraft had been removed from the statue books in the 1730s. It is generally considered to be the last of the counties witch hunts.

The old public house, The Fox and Goose, is still visible on Church Lane but has been converted to a private residence.

== Housing developments ==
After the 1950s, Great Glen underwent many post-war housing developments. One of the earliest was c.1970 and was one of the most significant, including development and construction in key roads such as Coverside Road, Ashby Rise, the houses around the library. Between 1931 and 1951, Great Glen saw a population increase of fewer than 100 residents. In the next 50 years, the population increased by nearly 2,300.

In 2013 Miller Homes began construction on a site previously identified as a Roman farmstead where they built 170 homes known as the Stretton Glen development. Upon completion of this development, the village's population was calculated to be 4,058 in the 2021 UK census. Further developments including Miller Homes' Regal View are currently in late stages of construction (as of June 2025) and expect to build a further 170 houses.

Some residents have expressed concerns about the impact of new developments on the village’s historical character, leading to the formation of local campaigns such as "Hands off Great Glen" and "Stop the New Town". Future developments around Stretton Hall and the wider Great Glen area have been in talks but there is still uncertainty around whether or not they will go forward. MP Neil O'Brien has stated that if the plans are approved, there is the potential for 4,000 new homes to be built on surrounding land although most of it would fall out the boundary of Great Glen's parish.
