= Foston, Leicestershire =

Medieval village in Leicestershire, England

Coordinates: 52.5582802°N 1.0529135°W

Foston
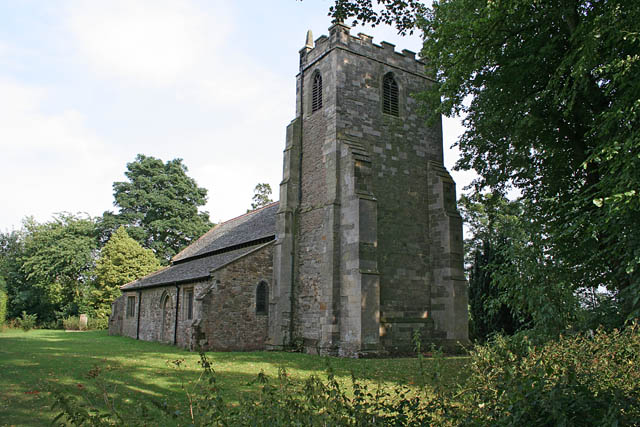
- St Bartholomew's church, Foston

- Location within Leicestershire
- Population: 13 (2011)
- OS grid reference: SP603951
  - London: 92 mi (148 km)
- Civil parish: Kilby
- District: Blaby
- Shire county: Leicestershire
- Region: East Midlands
- Country: England
- Sovereign state: United Kingdom
- Post town: LEICESTER
- Postcode district: LE8
- Dialling code: 0116
- Police: Leicestershire
- Fire: Leicestershire
- Ambulance: East Midlands
- UK Parliament: South Leicestershire
- Website: Kilby Parish Council

Foston is a deserted medieval village in the civil parish of Kilby, in the Blaby district of Leicestershire and lies approximately 6.1 miles (9.8 km) south of the city of Leicester, England.

== Geography ==
Foston is situated on a ridge on the south side of the valley of the River Sence, between the villages of Kilby 1.06 miles (1.71 km) to the east, Countesthorpe to the west 1.1 miles (1.8 km), Peatling Magna 1.61 miles (2.59 km) to the south, and the hamlet of Kilby Bridge 1.29 miles (2.08 km) to the north. The soils are "Slowly permeable seasonally wet slightly acid but base-rich loamy and clayey soils", according to UK Soil Observatory results. The site of the settlement is situated on Till (a superficial deposit formed up to 2 million years ago in the Quaternary Period) that is underpinned by Blue Lias mudstone (55-120 million years old).

== History ==
The settlement name Foston means "Fotr's farm/settlement": "Fotr" is an Old Norse personal name, and "tūn" in Old English means an enclosure, farmstead, village or estate. Mentioned in the Domesday Book Survey of 1086, Foston was a settlement in the Hundred of Guthlaxton, Leicestershire. It had an estimated population of 26 households in 1086. The village Church of St Bartholomew is a Grade II* listed building. The main body of the church dates to the early 14th century, but parts of the structure are 10th century. The village of Foston is clearly visible on the 1576 map of Warwickshire and Leicestershire, produced (in Latin) by Christopher Saxton as part of his Atlas of England and Wales, but no indication of village settlement size is shown. A survey by John Nichols, published in 1790, stated only four houses in the village of Foston. The number of houses rose to five in 1801, with a population of 24 "employed in agriculture" followed by an increase to six houses in the 1870s, with 27 residents. However, all that is visible today is its church, rectory, a few houses and a farm.

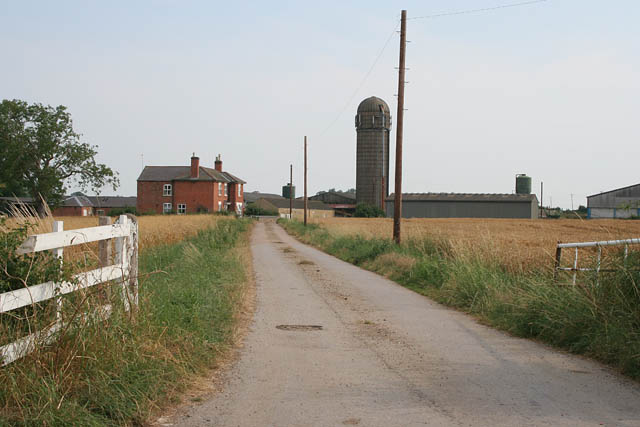
Foston Hall Farm (2006)

In 1931 the parish of Foston had a population of 36. On 1 April 1935 the parish was abolished and merged with Kilby.
