= Kilby =

Village in Leicestershire, England

Coordinates: 52.553139°N 1.0873400°W

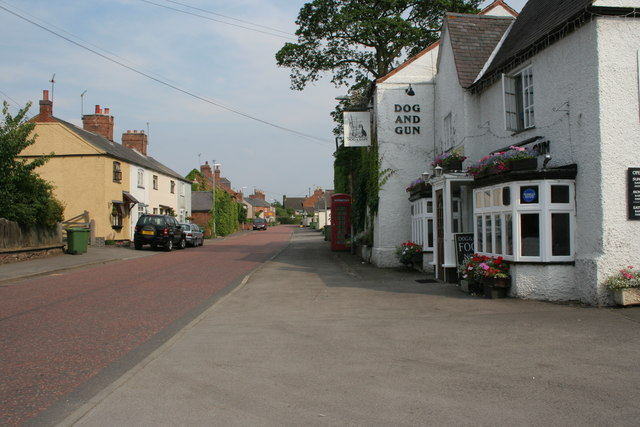
- Main Street, Kilby (2006)

- Location within Leicestershire
- Area: 3.7440326 sq mi (9.697000 km^{2})
- Population: 270 (2011)
  - Density: 72/sq mi (28/km^{2})
- OS grid reference: SP6197895424
  - London: 100.1 mi (161.1 km) SE
- Civil parish: Kilby
- District: Blaby
- Shire county: Leicestershire
- Region: East Midlands
- Country: England
- Sovereign state: United Kingdom
- Post town: WIGSTON
- Postcode district: LE18
- Dialling code: 0116
- Police: Leicestershire
- Fire: Leicestershire
- Ambulance: East Midlands
- UK Parliament: South Leicestershire
- Website: Kilby Parish Council

Kilby is a village and civil parish in the Blaby district of Leicestershire, England. Kilby is the easternmost village in the district, and is 6.1 miles (9.8 km) south east of Leicester. Kilby civil parish includes the former parish of Foston and its deserted medieval village. Nearby places are Countesthorpe 2.21 miles (3.56 km), Fleckney 2.12 miles (3.41 km), Arnesby 1.96 miles (3.15 km), Wistow 1.4 miles (2.3 km) and Kilby Bridge 1.18 miles (1.90 km).

In 1870–72, John Marius Wilson's Imperial Gazetteer of England and Wales described Kilby as follows:

"KILBY, a parish, with a village, in Blaby district, Leicestershire; on a branch of the river Soar, and on the Union canal, 2 miles SSE of Wigston r. station, and 6½ SSE of Leicester. Post town, Wigston, under Leicester. Acres, 1, 060. Real property, £2, 200. Pop., 362. Houses, 95. The property is divided among a few. Framework knitting is carried on. The living is a p. curacy in the diocese of Peterborough. Value, £63. Patron, Sir H. Halford, Bart. The church is plain and good, with a very low tower. There is an Independent chapel."

== History ==
Kilby has had the origins of its name possibly traced back to a Scandinavian form of Old English, being translated to 'children's farm/settlement.' Kilby was mentioned in the Domesday book where it was said to have been originally formed around the parish Church of St. Mary Magdalene. In the Domesday book of 1068 Kilby or Cilebi, as it was spelt, resided in a district called 'Guthlaxton Wapentake' under the ownership of Oger the Breton who was recorded as Tennant-in-chief. Kilby was recorded as having "28 households, containing 9 villagers, 7 smallholders, 2 slaves and 10 freemen." Kilby was also reported as having a meadow consisting of 12 acres and 1 mill. Prior to the Domesday book the Lord of Kilby was recorded as Eur who resided as Lord during 1066.

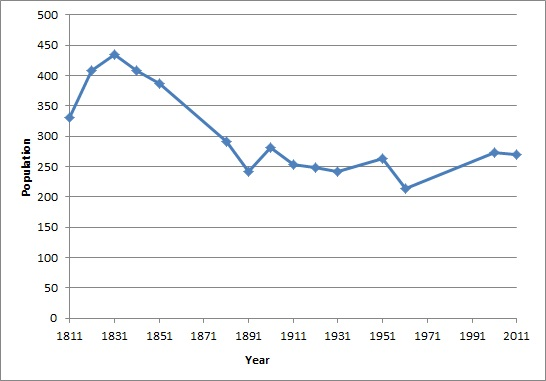
Total Population of Kilby parish in Leicestershire as reported by the census population 1811-2011

The parish Church is now located around a quarter of a mile away from the centre of modern-day Kilby. The original parish Church finished construction in 1220, however this was replaced by the present day parish Church which was consecrated in 1858. Population data for Kilby is available dating back to 1811 which at the time had a total population of 242. This figure is close to the 2011 census report of 270 inhabitants. Kilby reached its peak population, as dictated by census records, in 1831 with 434 inhabitants living in the village. This figure then significantly dropped to 291 in the 1881 census. The population of Kilby has remained fairly consistent from 1881 to 2011. Kilby contains a number of listed buildings such as the Bakehouse, Dog and Gun Public House and Kilby Lodge. Many of the listed buildings date back to at least the 17th century.

== Boundary changes ==
During the 19th century it is recorded that Kilby became an independent parish, having been previously in union with Newton Harcourt and Fleckney. It is thought that they had formed the ancient parish sometime in the 13th century. Another boundary change occurred within Kilby during the First World War. This happened due to Lord Cottesloe of Wigston selling 50 acres of smallholdings to Leicestershire County Council, which were in turn given to ex-servicemen from Kilby who had fought in the War.

The boundaries of the parish of Kilby were enlarged in April 1936 when the parish extended to include Foston after the closing of Foston Civil parish. This caused the parish boundaries of Kilby to increase from 1,068 acres to 2,401 acres, an increase of 1,333 acres. To this day the parish of Kilby still includes Foston.

== Occupational statistics ==
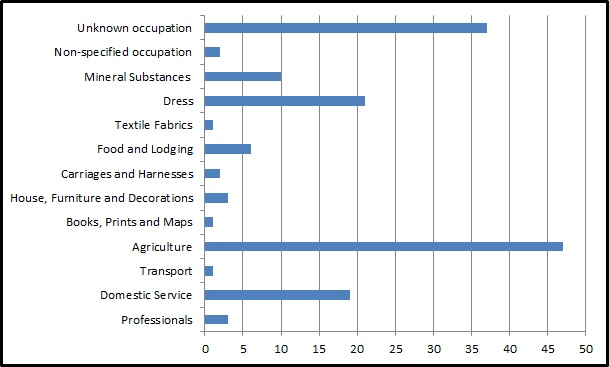
Occupational employment for Kilby as reported by the 1881 census report

Industrial occupational statistics for Kilby are available within the 1881 census. These statistics show that the main employment sector for workers in Kilby in 1881 was agriculture with 30.1% of the population involved. The industrial statistics also show that there was no significant divide in the number of men and women employed in occupational sectors. Male workers made up 50.9% of the total number of workers while women consisted of 49.1%. However, there was a significant divide in the number of men and women employed in the agricultural occupational sector. Within the agricultural workforce 97.87% of the workers were male while 2.13% of the workers were female.

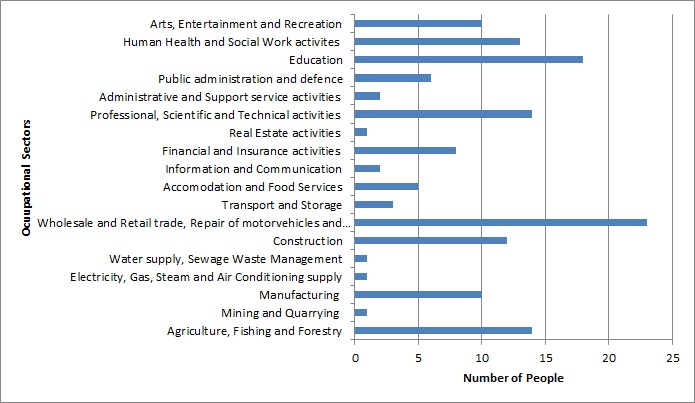
Kilby Occupational Sector Graph, 2011

Modern day Kilby has seen a shift in the distribution of those involved in occupational employment as compared to the 1881 census report. The 2011 census statistics showed that the most popular occupational employment sector in Kilby was the wholesale and retail trade and the repair of motor vehicles and motorcycles with 15.9% of the working population involved. This has changed from the 1881 census statistic of agriculture being the most prominent form of employment in Kilby with 30.1% of the working population being engaged in agriculture. Whereas in modern-day Kilby only 9.7% of the population is employed in agriculture, a difference of 20.4%. The agricultural occupational sector began to nationally decline in the first half of the 20th century due to the industrialisation and mechanisation of agriculture. The agricultural sector was replaced by service industries as the major employment sector across England. This national trend can be seen within the industrial statistics available for Kilby where the prominent employment sector in 2011 was a service industry. The total number of persons employed in occupational sectors has decreased between 1881 and 2011. In 1881 the total number of people in employment was 152. This is greater than the 144 persons in employment sectors in Kilby in 2011. In 2011 the working population was smaller than 1881 even though the overall population of Kilby was greater than 1881. This can be attributed to children leaving school at a younger age in the 19th century to go to work, as opposed to the 21st century.

== Present day ==
Kilby has only one pub called the Dog & Gun, an Anglican Primary School, a Parish Church and a park for the residents of Kilby. The park has a small football field, swings, a roundabout, and a picnic table. The park also has a wooden play castle with a tunnel slide, monkey bars and a climbing wall which was made by hand in 2019 by Tony Kilsby, a village resident for over 40 years. There is also a small elderly community. Kilby is located near the River Sence. The population of the Kilby civil parish (which includes the former parish of Foston) at the 2011 census was 270.

Arriva Midlands operate service 44A/44S through Kilby providing hourly bus services into Wigston Magna and Leicester.

== Education ==
Kilby contains one school called Kilby St Mary's Church of England Primary school, which educates children from age 4 to age 11. The school came into existence in the 1850s and is currently a listed building. As of September 2011 the current headteacher of the primary school is Ms Phillipa Denny. Secondary education pupils in Kilby have to travel beyond the village for schooling. The two closest secondary schools to Kilby are Wigston Birkett House Community Special School and The Beauchamp College. These schools are located 2.3 miles (3.7 km) and 2.4 miles (3.9 km) away from the village respectively.

== Places of interest ==
Kilby Wood is a woodland comprising 12.5 acres located to the south of Kilby. The woodland is continuing its growth with a 30-year lease being given by Leicestershire County Council. Villagers from Kilby have helped expand the woodland by sponsoring trees in memory of loved ones.

== Foston ==
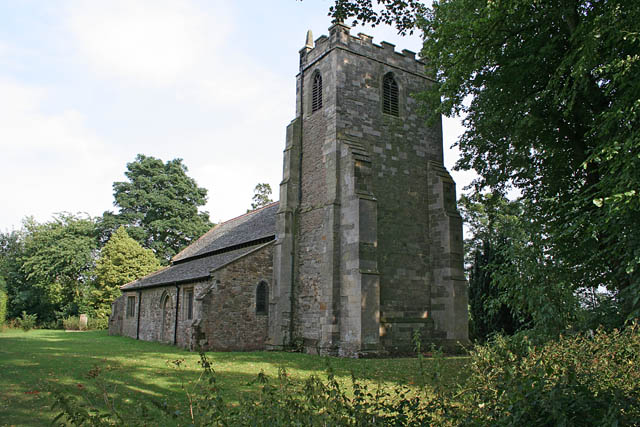
St Bartholomew's church, Foston

The parish includes the deserted village of Foston 1.06 miles (1.71 km) to its west at grid reference SP 606 951 of which only the church, its rectory and a farm remain. In the 1870s Foston was recorded as having six houses and 27 residents. The name 'Foston' means 'farm/settlement of Fotr'.
