= Kilby - Foxton Canal =

Protected area in Leicestershire, England

Coordinates: 52.557°N 1.039°W

- Site of Special Scientific Interest
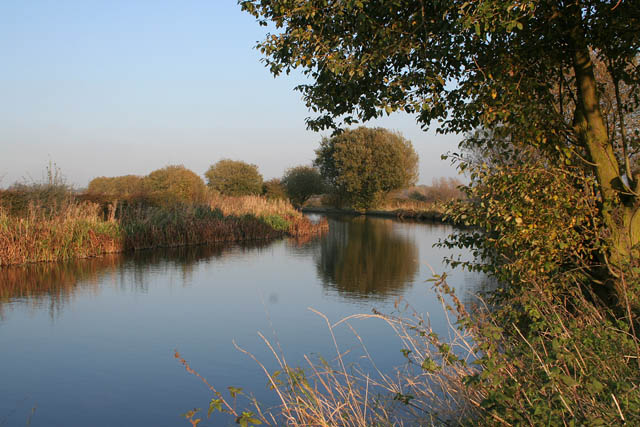
- Location of Kilby - Foxton Canal.
- Area of search: Leicestershire
- Grid reference: SP 648 949
- Interest: Biological
- Area: 32.1 hectares (79 acres)
- Notification date: 1984
- Location map: Magic Map

Kilby - Foxton Canal is a 32.1 hectares (79 acres) biological Site of Special Scientific Interest along the Grand Union Canal and its banks in Leicestershire, between Kilby Bridge, south of Wigston, and Debdale Wharf, north of Foxton.

Nine species of pondweed have been recorded on the canal, two of which are nationally rare, and submerged plants include Nuttall's waterweed and yellow water-lily. Fleckney Tunnel has a long established colony of Daubenton's bats.

The canal towpath runs through the site.
