= Charley, Leicestershire =

Civil parish in Leicestershire, England

Coordinates: 52.728°N 1.300°W

Charley is a civil parish located in the North West Leicestershire district of Leicestershire, England. According to the 2001 census, it had a population of 203, increasing to 236 at the 2011 census. It is set within the Charnwood Forest.

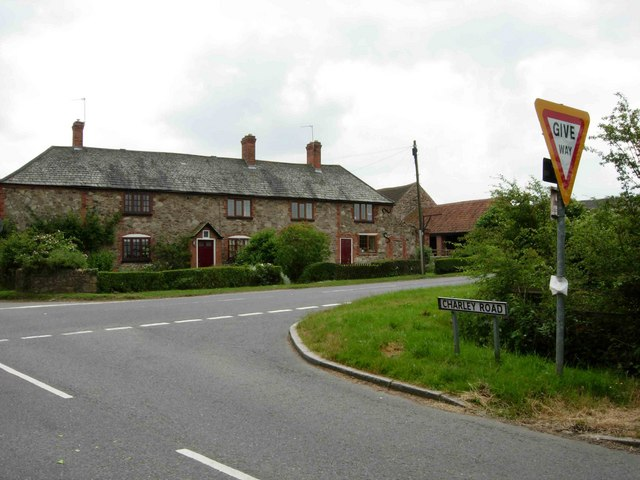
Crossroads in Charley photographed June 2006

The name 'Charley' means 'wood/clearing with a cairn'.

A quarry within the parish was the source of Charley Forest whetstones.

Charley is near to Shepshed, Copt Oak and Whitwick.

The parish of Charley contains Mount Saint Bernard Abbey and the hamlet of Oaks in Charnwood. The parish church of St James the Greater, Oaks in Charnwood was consecrated on 18 June 1815, the same day as the Battle of Waterloo and a selection of French lances captured from the battle can be seen inside the church, mounted on the north wall.
