= Kilbey =

Kilbey is a surname. Notable people with the surname include:

- Cara Kilbey (born 1987), English television personality and sister of Tom Kilbey
- Steve Kilbey (born 1954), English-Australian singer-songwriter and bass guitarist
- Tom Kilbey (born 1990), English footballer and television personality

== See also ==
- Kilby (name)
