= Harvey Barnes =

English footballer (born 1997)

- Barnes playing for Newcastle United in 2026.

Personal information
- Full name: Harvey Lewis Barnes
- Date of birth: 9 December 1997 (age 28)
- Place of birth: Burnley, England
- Height: 5 ft 11 in (1.80 m)
- Position: Winger

Team information
- Current team: Newcastle United
- Number: 11

Youth career
- 2007–2016: Leicester City

Senior career*
| Years | Team | Apps | (Gls) |
| 2016–2023 | Leicester City | 146 | (35) |
| 2017 | → Milton Keynes Dons (loan) | 21 | (6) |
| 2017–2018 | → Barnsley (loan) | 23 | (5) |
| 2018–2019 | → West Bromwich Albion (loan) | 26 | (9) |
| 2023– | Newcastle United | 102 | (24) |

International career^{‡}
| 2017–2018 | England U20 | 10 | (6) |
| 2018–2019 | England U21 | 4 | (0) |
| 2020– | England | 2 | (0) |
- * Club domestic league appearances and goals as of 01:12, 21 November 2026 (UTC) ‡ National team caps and goals as of 23:59, 27 March 2026 (UTC)

Harvey Lewis Barnes (born 9 December 1997) is an English professional footballer who plays as a winger for Premier League club Newcastle United and the England national team.

Barnes joined Leicester City at the age of nine years old before signing his first professional contract as well as making his first appearance for the club in 2016. He had loan spells with Milton Keynes Dons, Barnsley and West Bromwich Albion. He won the FA Cup and FA Community Shield with Leicester in 2021 before departing for Newcastle United in 2023.

At international level, Barnes has represented England at youth level, including winning the 2017 Toulon Tournament. He made his debut for the England senior team in 2020.

== Early life ==
Harvey Lewis Barnes was born on 9 December 1997 in Burnley, Lancashire, and brought up in Countesthorpe, Leicestershire. He is the son of former professional footballer Paul Barnes. Both of his maternal grandparents were born in Scotland. In 2009, Barnes played for Greenfield Primary School in the Leicestershire & Rutland Schools Football Association competition known as The Rice Bowl. After leaving Greenfield, he attended Leysland High School and Countesthorpe College.

== Club career ==
=== Leicester City ===
==== Youth career ====
Barnes is a product of the Leicester Academy, which he joined on 8 June 2007 at the age of nine. He signed his first professional contract with the club on 25 June 2016 and on 7 December made his debut for the first team as a second-half substitute in a 5–0 defeat away to Porto in the UEFA Champions League. During the first half of the 2016–17 Premier League 2 season for Leicester City U23, Barnes scored five goals and provided assists for five others.

==== Loan to Milton Keynes Dons ====
On 20 January 2017, Barnes joined League One club Milton Keynes Dons on loan for the remainder of the 2016–17 season. A day later, Barnes scored on his home debut as a 76th-minute substitute for Chuks Aneke in a 5–3 win over Northampton Town. Barnes followed his debut goal with another goal a week later, on 28 January, scoring in a 4–0 away win over rivals Peterborough United.

On 2 May 2017, after impressing with six goals in 21 appearances for the club, he was awarded Milton Keynes Dons' Young Player of the Year 2016–17 award.

On 21 July 2017, Barnes signed a new four-year contract, keeping him at Leicester until June 2021.

==== Loan to Barnsley and recall ====
On 11 August 2017, Barnes joined Championship club Barnsley on a season-long loan. The following day, he made his debut for the club as an 80th-minute substitute in a 1–2 home defeat to Ipswich Town. He scored his first goal for Barnsley against Sunderland on 26 August 2017.

On 1 January 2018, Barnes was recalled from his loan spell at Barnsley and returned to Leicester City.

He made his Premier League debut on 19 April 2018, as a 91st-minute substitute in a 0–0 draw against Southampton.

==== Loan to West Bromwich Albion ====
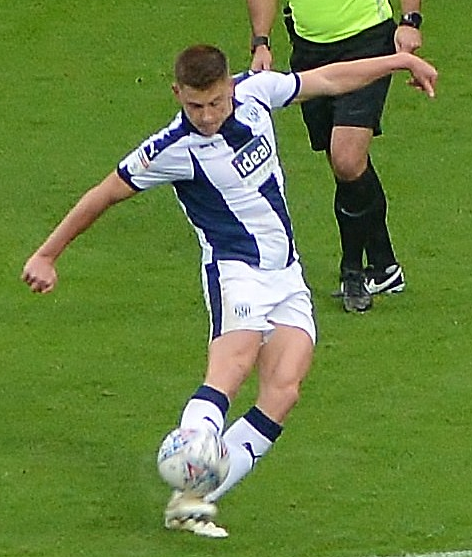
Barnes playing for West Bromwich Albion in 2018.

In July 2018, after originally agreeing a deal to join Leeds United on loan, Barnes changed his mind at the last moment and on 24 July 2018, Barnes signed a new four-year contract with Leicester and joined newly relegated Championship club West Bromwich Albion on a season long loan. He scored a spectacular goal on his league debut during a 2–1 home defeat against Bolton Wanderers on 4 August 2018.

During his spell at Albion, Barnes scored nine goals and made seven assists in 26 Championship matches.

==== Return to Leicester City ====
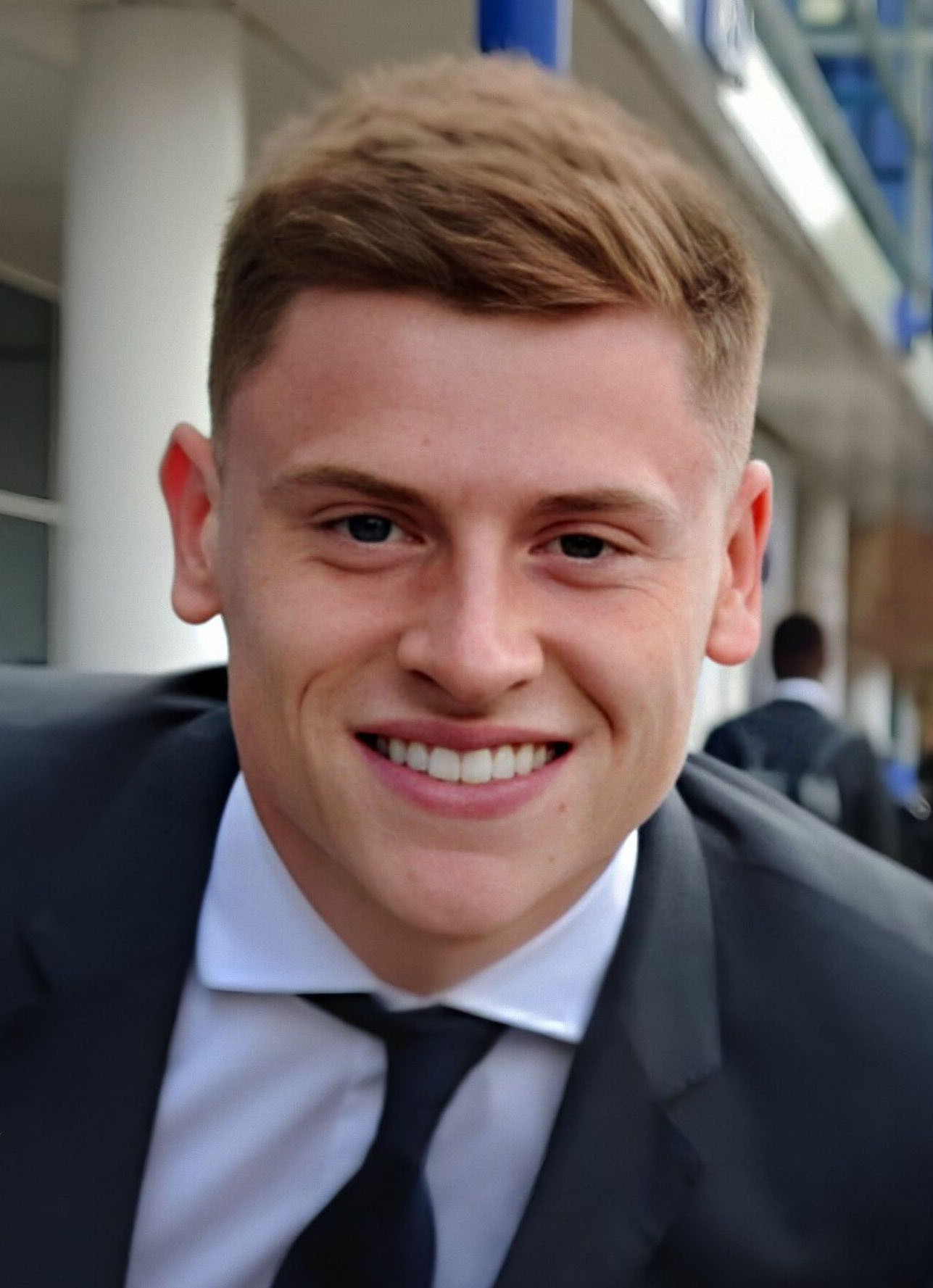
Barnes pictured with a fan during his time at Leicester City in 2022.

On 11 January 2019, Barnes was recalled by Leicester with immediate effect. He scored his first goal for Leicester on 20 April in a 2–2 draw with West Ham United. In June he signed a new five-year contract.

On 24 August 2019, Barnes scored a half-volley against Sheffield United to give Leicester City their first win of the 2019–20 season. The goal was later voted as Premier League Goal of the Month and Leicester City's Goal of the Season. He ended his first full season as a first team player with six goals and eight assists and was named the club's Young Player of the Season.

Barnes' form on the left wing helped Leicester to achieve consecutive fifth-place finishes in both the 2019–20 and 2020–21 Premier League seasons. However, an injury sustained in a 3–1 loss to Arsenal on 28 February 2021 prevented him from appearing in the later rounds of the 2020–21 FA Cup, which Leicester won by beating Chelsea 1–0 at Wembley Stadium in the final on 15 May.

On 19 August 2021, Barnes signed a new four-year contract at Leicester City, keeping him at the club until 2025. He also changed his squad number from 15 to 7.

He started the 2021–22 season by playing 78 minutes in Leicester's 1–0 win over Manchester City in the 2021 FA Community Shield.

During the 2022–23 season, Barnes scored 13 goals in 34 Premier League appearances. Despite his strong personal performance, Leicester were relegated to the Championship.

=== Newcastle United ===
On 23 July 2023, Barnes signed for Premier League club Newcastle United on a five-year contract for an undisclosed fee, believed to be in the region of £38 million. On 12 August, he recorded his first goal and assist on his debut in a 5–1 win over Aston Villa at St James' Park. On 24 September, Barnes was substituted in the 12th minute of an 8–0 win over Sheffield United at Bramall Lane with an injury which kept him out of the Newcastle first team until 3 February 2024, when he appeared as a substitute in a 4–4 draw with Luton Town, scoring the team's equalising goal.

On 16 March 2025, Barnes played for Newcastle in their victory in the 2025 EFL Cup final, making him part of the first Newcastle side to win a domestic trophy in 70 years. On 7 January 2026, Barnes scored the latest winning goal in Premier League history (101 minutes and 48 seconds) to secure a 4–3 victory over Leeds United. Later that year, on 27 July, he signed a new long-term contract with the club.

== International career ==
Barnes was called up for the England national under-20 team for the 2017 Toulon Tournament, in a squad that was made up of players from a number of age groups, with another under-20 team also playing at the 2017 FIFA U-20 World Cup. He made his debut on 29 May 2017, coming on as a substitute in a 1–0 win over Angola in England's opening group match. He made his first start in England's next match on 1 June, in which he scored twice in a 7–1 win over Cuba. On 10 June, Barnes scored his penalty kick in a penalty shoot-out in the final against the Ivory Coast, which England won 5–3 after a 1–1 draw. He finished the tournament as joint top scorer, along with teammate George Hirst and Angola's Chico Banza, with four goals. Barnes played five of England's seven matches in the 2017–18 Under 20 Elite League, which the team finished as runners-up. He finished his under-20 career with 10 appearances, which were earned between 2017 and 2018, and six goals.

Barnes received his first call-up for the England under-21s in May 2018 for the 2018 Toulon Tournament, although he was forced to withdraw from the squad through injury. He made his debut for the under-21s on 16 October when starting England's 2–0 away win over Scotland in 2019 UEFA European Under-21 Championship qualification. He was named in England's squad for the 2019 European Under-21 Championship in May 2019, and made one appearance at the tournament, in which England were eliminated at the group stage. Between 2018 and 2019, Barnes made four appearances for the under-21s.

Barnes was called up to the England senior team for the first time in October 2020, for a friendly against Wales and 2020–21 UEFA Nations League matches against Belgium and Denmark. He made his debut on 8 October in the match against Wales, coming on as a 76th-minute substitute in a 3–0 victory at Wembley Stadium. Another 3 minutes of added time meant he played 17 minutes in that game.

Despite having appeared once in a full international for England, Barnes remained eligible to play for Scotland due to his maternal grandparents being born there. It was suggested that he could switch nationality after Scotland qualified for the 2026 World Cup, but he ruled out this possibility in February 2026.

In March 2026, Barnes was called up by England ahead of friendlies against Uruguay and Japan.

== Career statistics ==
=== Club ===
As of match played 21 November 2026

Appearances and goals by club, season and competition
| Club | Season | League | | | FA Cup | | EFL Cup | | Europe | | Other | | Total | |
| Club | Season | Division | Apps | Goals | Apps | Goals | Apps | Goals | Apps | Goals | Apps | Goals | Apps | Goals |
|---|---|---|---|---|---|---|---|---|---|---|---|---|---|---|
| Leicester City | 2016–17 | Premier League | 0 | 0 | 0 | 0 | 0 | 0 | 1 (Note: Appearance(s) in UEFA Champions League) | 0 | 0 | 0 | 1 | 0 |
| Leicester City | 2017–18 | Premier League | 3 | 0 | 2 | 0 | — | | — | | — | | 5 | 0 |
| Leicester City | 2018–19 | Premier League | 16 | 1 | — | | — | | — | | — | | 16 | 1 |
| Leicester City | 2019–20 | Premier League | 36 | 6 | 3 | 1 | 3 | 0 | — | | — | | 42 | 7 |
| Leicester City | 2020–21 | Premier League | 25 | 9 | 2 | 1 | 0 | 0 | 8 (Note: Appearances in UEFA Europa League) | 3 | — | | 35 | 13 |
| Leicester City | 2021–22 | Premier League | 32 | 6 | 2 | 1 | 1 | 1 | 12 (Note: Four appearances and one goal in UEFA Europa League, eight appearances and two goals in UEFA Europa Conference League) | 3 | 1 (Note: Appearance in FA Community Shield) | 0 | 48 | 11 |
| Leicester City | 2022–23 | Premier League | 34 | 13 | 2 | 0 | 4 | 0 | — | | — | | 40 | 13 |
| Leicester City | Total | | 146 | 35 | 11 | 3 | 8 | 1 | 21 | 6 | 1 | 0 | 187 | 45 |
| Leicester City U23/U21 | 2016–17 | — | | | — | | — | | — | | 4 (Note: Appearance(s) in EFL Trophy) | 0 | 4 | 0 |
| Leicester City U23/U21 | 2017–18 | — | | | — | | — | | — | | 1 | 0 | 1 | 0 |
| Leicester City U23/U21 | Total | | — | | — | | — | | — | | 5 | 0 | 5 | 0 |
| Milton Keynes Dons (loan) | 2016–17 | League One | 21 | 6 | — | | — | | — | | — | | 21 | 6 |
| Barnsley (loan) | 2017–18 | Championship | 23 | 5 | — | | 2 | 0 | — | | — | | 25 | 5 |
| West Bromwich Albion (loan) | 2018–19 | Championship | 26 | 9 | 0 | 0 | 2 | 0 | — | | — | | 28 | 9 |
| Newcastle United | 2023–24 | Premier League | 21 | 5 | 1 | 0 | 0 | 0 | 1 | 0 | — | | 23 | 5 |
| Newcastle United | 2024–25 | Premier League | 33 | 9 | 2 | 0 | 5 | 0 | — | | — | | 40 | 9 |
| Newcastle United | 2025–26 | Premier League | 37 | 7 | 3 | 3 | 5 | 0 | 12 | 6 | — | | 57 | 16 |
| Newcastle United | 2026–27 | Premier League | 11 | 3 | 0 | 0 | 3 | 2 | — | | — | | 14 | 5 |
| Newcastle United | Total | | 102 | 24 | 6 | 3 | 13 | 2 | 13 | 6 | — | | 134 | 35 |
| Career total | | | 318 | 79 | 17 | 6 | 25 | 3 | 34 | 12 | 6 | 0 | 400 | 100 |

=== International ===
As of match played 27 March 2026

Appearances and goals by national team and year
| National team | Year | Apps | Goals |
|---|---|---|---|
| England | 2020 | 1 | 0 |
| England | 2026 | 1 | 0 |
| Total | | 2 | 0 |

== Honours ==
Leicester City

- FA Cup: 2020–21
- FA Community Shield: 2021

Newcastle United

- EFL Cup: 2024–25

England U20

- Toulon Tournament: 2017

Individual

- Toulon Tournament Best XI: 2017
- Leicester City Development Squad Player of the Year: 2016–17
- Milton Keynes Dons Young Player of the Year: 2016–17
- Premier League Goal of the Month: August 2019
