= Maurice Tompkin =

English sportsman

- Tompkin in c.1947

Personal information
- Born: 17 February 1919; Countesthorpe, Leicestershire, England
- Died: 27 September 1956 (aged 37); Leicester, Leicestershire, England
- Batting: Right-handed
- Bowling: Leg-break and googly
- Role: Batter

Domestic team information
- Years: Team
- 1938–1956: Leicestershire

Career statistics
Competition	First-class
Matches	378
Runs scored	19,927
Batting average	31.83
100s/50s	31/111
Top score	186
Balls bowled	112
Wickets	1
Bowling average	106.00
5 wickets in innings	0
10 wickets in match	0
Best bowling	1/1
Catches/stumpings	113/–
- Source: CricketArchive, 2 December 2024
Association football career
- Position: Striker
Senior career*
Years	Team	Apps	(Gls)
- Bury
- Leicester City
1946–1947	Huddersfield Town	10	(1)
- Kettering Town
- * Club domestic league appearances and goals

Maurice Tompkin (17 February 1919 – 27 September 1956) was an English sportsman who played first-class cricket with Leicestershire and professional football for Bury, Leicester City, Huddersfield Town and Kettering Town. He was born in Countesthorpe, Leicestershire.

He played as a middle-order batsman for Leicestershire from 1938 to 1956, scoring over 1000 runs a season from 1946 to 1955. After his most productive season, 1955, when he scored 2190 runs, he was selected to tour Pakistan with the Marylebone Cricket Club (MCC) in 1955–56. However, he suffered ill-health when he returned, and died in hospital from pancreatic cancer after an operation. His highest score was 186 for Leicestershire against the touring Pakistan team in 1954.
