= Leysland High School =

Location
- Winchester Road; Countesthorpe; Leicester, Leicestershire, LE8 5PR; England; 52°33′22″N 1°09′31″W

Information
- Type: Middle school, academy
- Department for Education URN: 138529 Tables
- Ofsted: Reports
- Head teacher: Catherine Aicherson
- Gender: Coeducational
- Age: 11 to 14
- Website: http://www.leysland.leics.sch.uk/

Leysland High School was a coeducational middle school with academy status, located in Countesthorpe, Leicestershire, England. It was open for students aged 11–14 (students in KS3). It received the rating of 'Outstanding' from Ofsted in April 2013. It merged with Countesthorpe Community College to form Countesthorpe Leysland Community College in July 2016.

== Notable alumni ==
- Harvey Barnes, professional footballer
