= Countesthorpe Academy =

Location
- Winchester Road; Countesthorpe, Leicestershire, LE8 5PR; England; 52°33′14″N 1°09′32″W

Information
- Type: Academy
- Motto: Be the best you can be
- Established: 1974, 2016
- Trust: LIFE Multi-Academy Trust
- Department for Education URN: 147902 Tables
- Ofsted: Reports
- Executive Headteacher: Gareth Williams
- Gender: Coeducational
- Age: 11 to 18
- Predecessors: Countesthorpe Community College; Leysland High School
- Website: www.clcc.college

Countesthorpe Academy (formerly Countesthorpe Leysland Community College) is a coeducational secondary school situated on the western edge of Countesthorpe in Leicestershire, England near the A426.

== History ==
Countesthorpe Academy was formed in 2016 by the merger of Countesthorpe Community College and neighbouring Leysland High School. Countesthorpe Community College was established in 1970 with Tim McMullen as its first head, or warden, followed in 1972 by John Watts as head teacher. They both developed it as a progressive "open school".

The school previously formed part of The South Leicestershire Learning Partnership, a multi-academy umbrella trust. In March 2020 the school joined the LIFE Multi-Academy Trust and was renamed Countesthorpe Academy, and is now led by Executive Head Gareth Williams.

== Facilities ==
The school occupies the buildings previously used by its predecessor institutions. The former Countesthorpe Community College buildings are notable for their circular plan. The architect was John Barton of Farmer and Dark. The sculpture that was previously in the middle of the courtyard is one of three versions of Dunstable Reel by Phillip King.

The seniors department of Birkett House School is located on the site of Countesthorpe Academy and its students attend lessons at the school and use its sports and catering facilities.

== Concerns and criticisms ==
In July 2019 Countesthorpe Leysland Community College was judged to be "inadequate" by Ofsted. During the inspection, inspectors found serious failings in safeguarding and pupil well being, they discovered that many students feel unsafe at school, found poor behaviour exhibited by a significant group of pupils and they identified shortcomings in the quality of leadership offered by the senior leadership team.

Concerns were also raised about the poor quality of toilet facilities available at the college, which have since been refurbished which was reported in both local and national media.

== Notable former pupils ==
- Harvey Barnes, professional footballer
- Pete Morton, singer songwriter
- Wayne Dobson, magician/entertainer
- Kasabian, band
