= Brascote =

Hamlet in Leicestershire, England

Coordinates: 52.61°N 01.35°W

- Location within Leicestershire
- Population: <10
- OS grid reference: SK4402
- District: Hinckley and Bosworth
- Shire county: Leicestershire
- Region: East Midlands
- Country: England
- Sovereign state: United Kingdom
- Post town: Leicester
- Postcode district: LE9
- Police: Leicestershire
- Fire: Leicestershire
- Ambulance: East Midlands
- UK Parliament: Hinckley and Bosworth

Brascote is a hamlet forming part of the Newbold Verdon civil parish in the Hinckley and Bosworth district of Leicestershire, England.

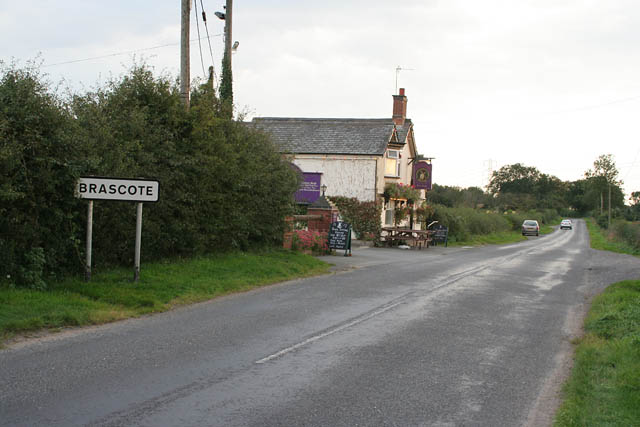
The Windmill September 2006

The population is included in the parish of Newbold Verdon.

Among a handful of residences is a pub, named The Windmill. Previous medieval and post medieval settlements on the same site were deserted.

Brascote House, one of the two farms in Brascote was demolished in 2009 to allow for the land beneath to be quarried.
