= Abbots Oak =

Hamlet in Leicestershire, England

Coordinates: 52.724°N 1.312°W

Abbots Oak is a hamlet near Coalville, Leicestershire, comprising a cluster of dwellings near Warren Hills, either side of the road between Whitwick and Copt Oak.

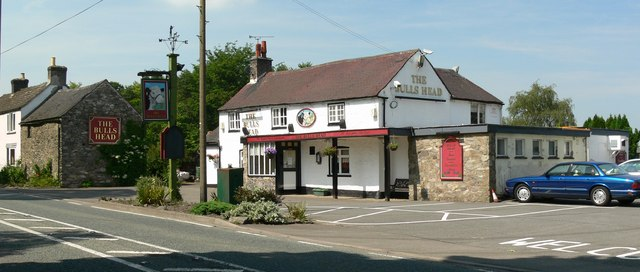
The Bulls Head public house

The Bull's Head public house, claims the distinction of being the highest public house in Leicestershire, at 787 feet (240 m) above sea level.

The hamlet also contains the Abbots Oak Country House, which is a Grade II listed building. The house is built of Charnwood granite and has an imposing tower with a fine wooden staircase; its listing description ascribes a mid-nineteenth century origin.
