= Woodthorpe, Leicestershire =

Hamlet in Leicestershire, England

Coordinates: 52°45′4.00″N 1°11′47.50″W

Woodthorpe
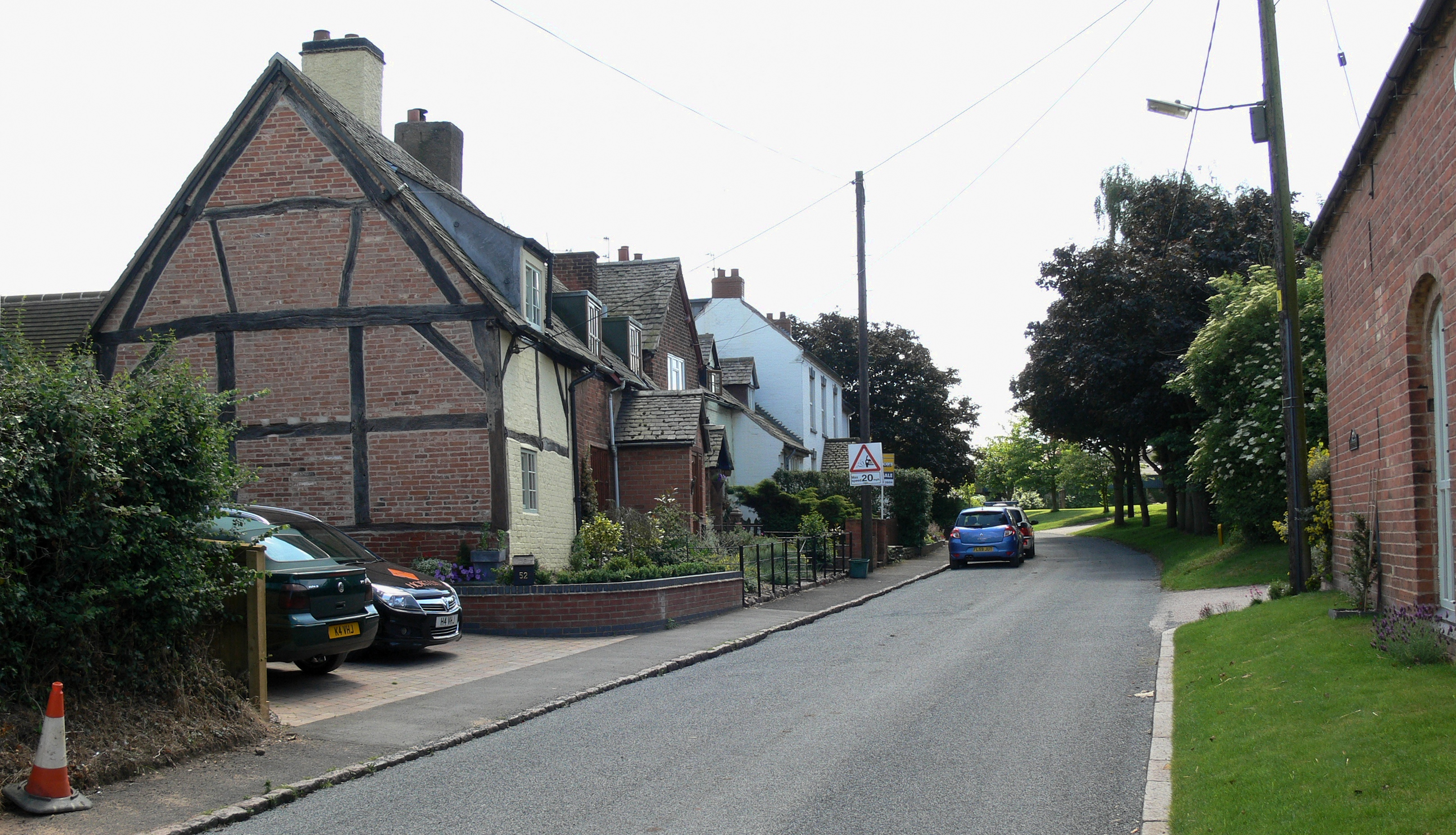
- Main Street

- Location within Leicestershire
- District: Charnwood
- Shire county: Leicestershire
- Region: East Midlands
- Country: England
- Sovereign state: United Kingdom

Woodthorpe is a hamlet just south of Loughborough and a former civil parish in the Charnwood district of Leicestershire, England. In 1931, the parish had a population of 53.

In the Imperial Gazetteer of England and Wales (1870–72) John Marius Wilson described Woodthorpe:

WOODTHORPE, a hamlet in Loughborough parish, Leicester; 1½ mile S of Loughborough. Real property, £1,236. Pop., 67. Houses, 16.

Woodthorpe became a parish in 1866, on 1 April 1935 the parish was abolished and merged with Loughborough, part also went to Quorndon and Woodhouse.
