= Kilby Bridge =

Hamlet in Leicestershire, England

Coordinates: 52.567551°N 1.101521°W

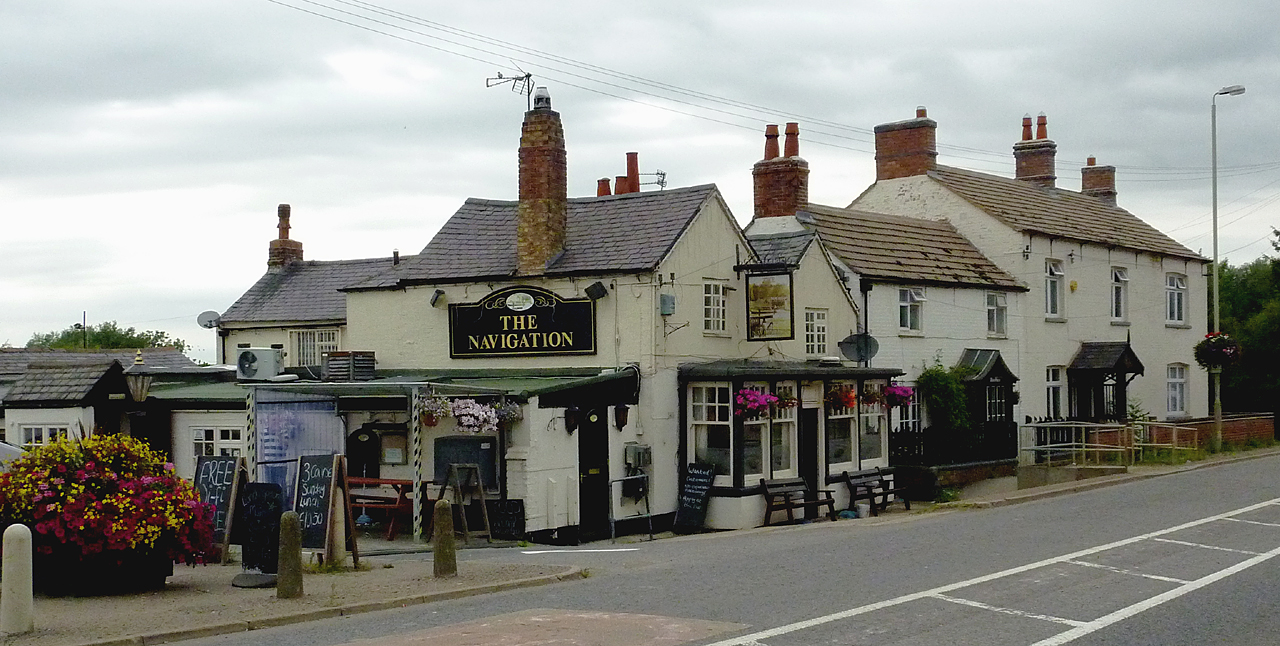
- Kilby Bridge in 2013

- Location within Leicestershire
- Population: 36 (2011)
- OS grid reference: SP609970
  - London: 84.64 mi (136.21 km)
- Civil parish: Oadby and Wigston, unparished area
- District: Oadby and Wigston
- Shire county: Leicestershire
- Region: East Midlands
- Country: England
- Sovereign state: United Kingdom
- Post town: WIGSTON
- Postcode district: LE18
- Dialling code: 0116
- Police: Leicestershire
- Fire: Leicestershire
- Ambulance: East Midlands
- UK Parliament: Harborough
- Website: Oadby & Wigston Borough Council

Kilby Bridge is a hamlet on the A5199 Welford Road in the borough of Oadby and Wigston, Leicestershire, England, a few miles south of the city of Leicester. The population of the hamlet at the 2011 census was 36.

== Geography ==
Kilby Bridge forms part of the borough of Oadby and Wigston, the southernmost boundary of which is along the River Sence, situated in the Sence valley 1.32 miles (2.12 km) south of Wigston Magna between the village of Newton Harcourt 1.71 miles (2.75 km) to the east and the deserted medieval village of Foston 0.63 miles (1.01 km) to the south. The hamlet has two bridges that take the Welford Road over the River Sence and the Grand Union Canal. The third bridge takes the Midland Main Line railway over the Welford Road to the north of the hamlet.

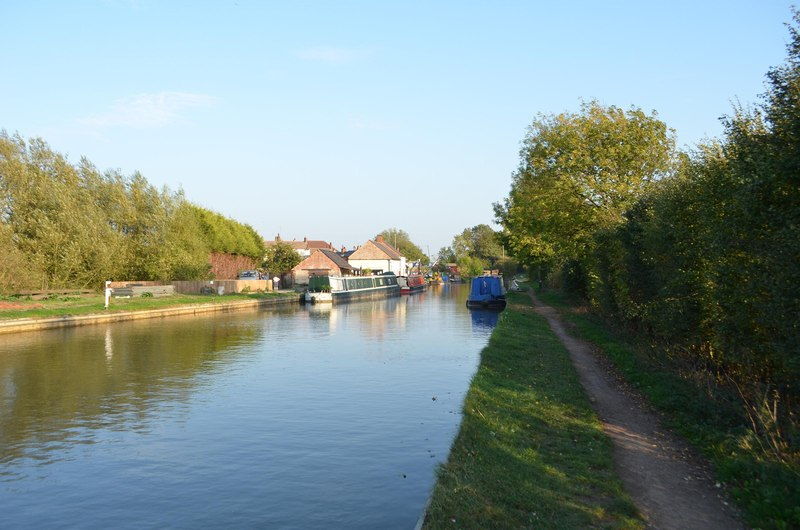
Grand Union Canal - Kilby Bridge (2011)

== History ==
Mention of a stone bridge over the River Sence at Kilby Bridge can be found in records dating back to the late 13th century (c. 1282–92). Originally written as Stanbrig or Stanbric (Stone Bridge) on the river, the bridge is listed in what was then known as Kilby gate (the road to Kilby) in the Broad Meadow up to at least 1731. The Grand Union Canal arrived in the early 1790s and the railway line arrived in the mid-1850s.

== Today ==
The commercial activities of the area include a canal side public house, the Navigation Inn; a depot owned by British Waterways; and a car dealership.
