= Copt Oak =

Hamlet in Leicestershire, England

Coordinates: 52.711°N 1.289°W

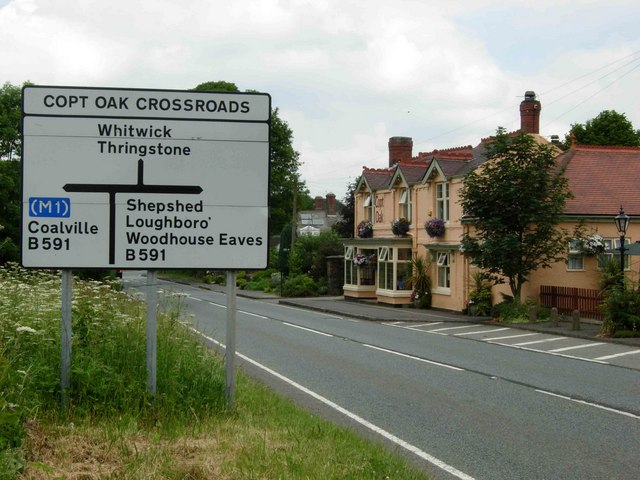
The Copt Oak pub and crossroads

Copt Oak is a hamlet in Leicestershire, England. It is located in the North West Leicestershire district near the large village of Markfield and the rural hamlets of Abbots Oak, Charley, Ulverscroft, and Nanpantan.

In its name, cop is an old English word for head, i.e. "pollarded oak" (literally "[be]headed oak").

== Features ==
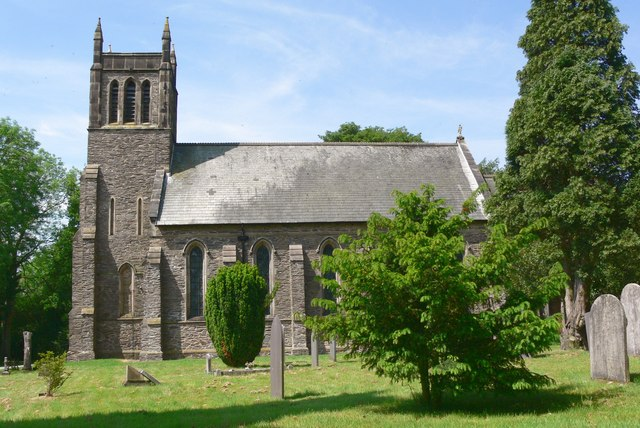
St Peter's Church, Copt Oak

The area is centred on a section of the B591 and Whitwick Road, consisting of the large Copt Oak pub-restaurant, a church, and a cluster of residential dwellings and farms.

The Anglican Church of Saint Peter was consecrated in 1837 and was designed by William Railton, who later designed Nelson's Column in London.

For many years the hostel, north of the junction of the A50 and the M1, was known for its small youth hostel in the old schoolhouse, which was closed and converted into a residential home.

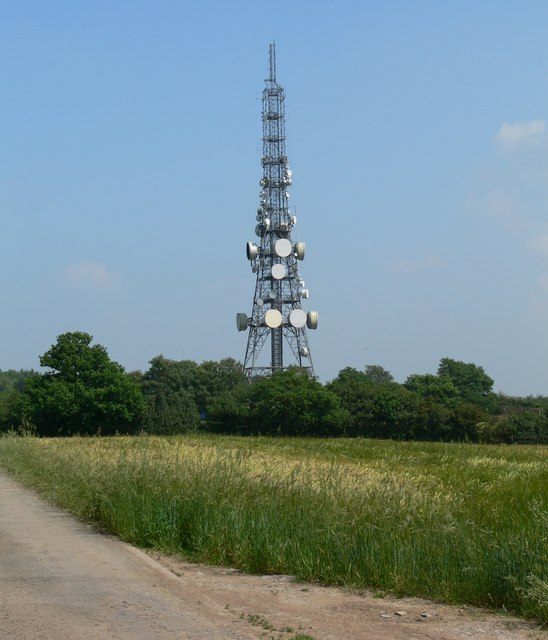
Copt Oak transmitter next to the M1 motorway.

Copt Oak is the highest point of the M1, and the site of BBC Radio Leicester's only transmitter on 104.9 MHz FM (V.H.F.), and also the main transmitter of Greatest Hits Radio East Midlands (formerly Gem before October 2023) on 106.0FM.

Copt Oak was the meeting place in the centre of the forest, marked by a great tree (The Copest Oak) from the Anglo-Saxon word 'cop' meaning cap or top. This tree was situated at the back of the present churchyard. It was blown down in 1855 when tradition says it was 2,000 years old. in 1855 it was 20 feet high and 24 feet in circumference.
