= Saddington =

Village in Leicestershire, England

Coordinates: 52°31′N 1°02′W

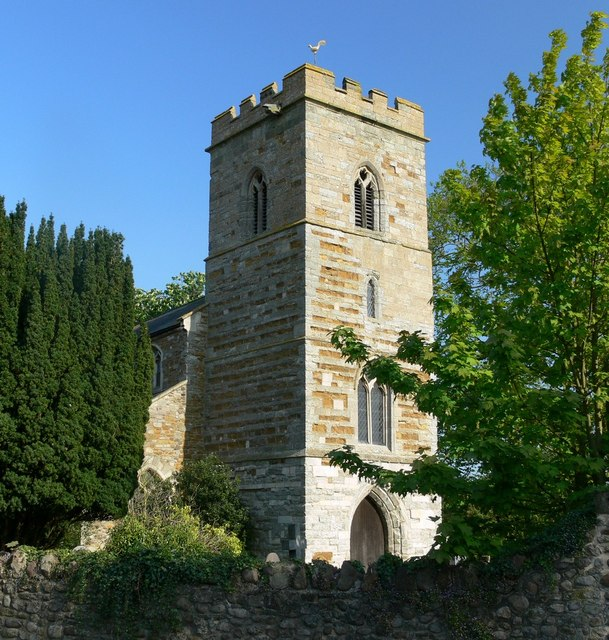
- St Helen's Church, Saddington

- Location within Leicestershire
- Population: 309 (2011 Census)
- District: Harborough
- Shire county: Leicestershire
- Region: East Midlands
- Country: England
- Sovereign state: United Kingdom
- Post town: LEICESTER
- Postcode district: LE8
- Dialling code: 0116
- Police: Leicestershire
- Fire: Leicestershire
- Ambulance: East Midlands
- UK Parliament: Harborough, Oadby and Wigston

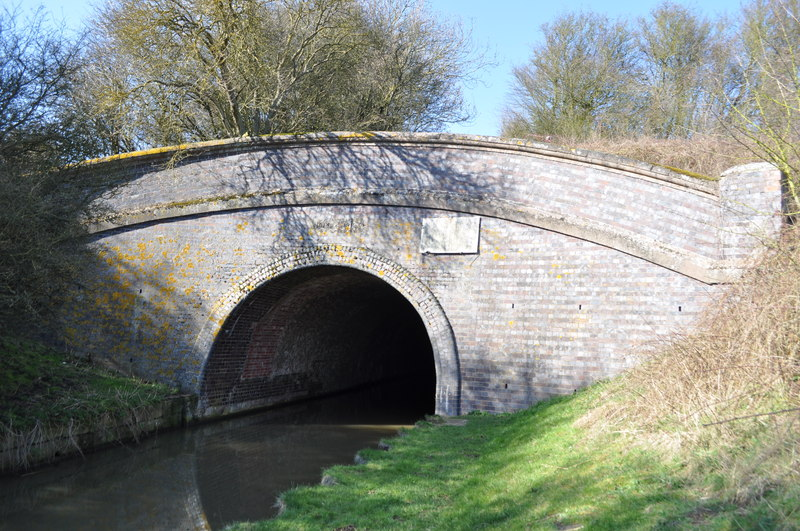
Tunnel entrance to the Grand Union Canal

Saddington is a village in the Harborough district of Leicestershire, England. It is close to Smeeton Westerby, Gumley, Kibworth and Fleckney. The population of the civil parish at the 2011 census was 309.

It is a small hilltop village close to and south of Fleckney. It overlooks the Saddington Reservoir, constructed in 1802 to feed the Grand Union Canal. The canal flows through the parish including in a tunnel of 0.5 miles (0.80 km). The church of St Helen in medieval style largely dates from 1872–73 and retains an original 13th-century north doorway and other masonry of around 1300 and around 1400.

The Saddington Treacle Mine is a notable fictional local attraction, often referred to by locals of the surrounding villages.

Saddington is also home to the Manor Farm Riding School along the main street next to the church of St Helen.

== Schools ==
The school in Saddington opened in 1828 and by 1833 it had 70 pupils, 40 boys and 30 girls, with an average Sunday school attendance of 60 children. By 1855 a new national school was built and was constructed as a single-storey red-brick building. The school attendance declined over time and had only 29 pupils by 1910. The school was designated as a junior school in 1931, with the senior pupils being transferred to Church Langton.

== Church ==
St Helen's Church was almost entirely rebuilt and restored in 1872-73 by contractor/designer Frederick Peck, save the east window, installed by Goddards of Leicester in 1864. Its second and third stages are of banded ironstone and limestone. In the centuries leading up to this rebuilding project, the fabric of the church and most of its internal features and objects were visibly intermittently repaired, restored or replaced. Oldest preserved features include the three bays of the south arcade, the north doorway, the tower and the nave arcades, dating to the 13th century. The parts of the church which were restored, dating from the 14th century include, the unbuttressed church tower, the font set and base and the arched piscina in the chancel. It is listed in the middle of the three possible categories of listed building (grade II*). The oldest monument is an incised floor slab in the chancel to Richard Holland, rector (d. 1628). There are four bells of 1760-62 and a fifth ordered by the Archdeacon, of 1777. The sixth bell (treble, lightest bell) was added in 1983, cast by Eijsbouts in the Netherlands.

== Former combined ecclesiastical and civil parish records ==
Saddington became part of the Market Harborough Union in 1836 who maintained its workhouses elsewhere; the parish records indicate that in 1802-03, 27 children and 19 adults received outdoor payments to relieve their pauperism. Surviving parish records include 'town books' which give details of overseers, constables, surveyors and accounts for the periods 1781-1816 and 1820-38. Overseers accounts exist for 1792-1824 as do papers detailing poor relief, which includes a vestry minute-book covering 1871-1931.

== Surname ==
The parish registers date to 1538. A toponymic surname locally endemic in 1881 is Saddington; those who have inherited it are biological or adoptive descendants of Henry of Saddington, who was born in 1603, and who it is inferred had no brothers, and either he or a male ancestor adopted the surname late in the history of such names.
