= Great Glen Methodist Church =

Coordinates: 52.5750°N 1.0325°W

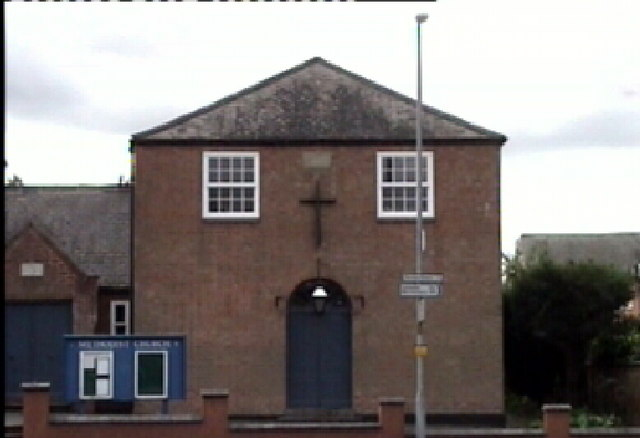
- Great Glen Methodist Church
- Great Glen Methodist Church
- OS grid reference: SP 65662 97901
- Location: Oaks Road, Great Glen, Leicestershire
- Country: England
- Denomination: Methodist

History
- Founded: 1827

Architecture
- Style: Chapel

Great Glen Methodist Church, Leicestershire, was built in 1827 and a church hall was later added to the east of the church in 1879.

== The church today ==
An aerial view of the church and its location can be found at Google Maps

The minister is the Reverend Helen White.

== Church activities ==
The church has the following activities in addition to its normal morning Sunday service starting at 10:30 am (Check the web page for service details.)

The church is are focal point for the village on Saturday morning with people dropping in for coffee and a chat. (10am to 11:30)0 On the first Saturday of each month the refreshments include Bacon Butties Many people pop into the church for some quiet prayer whilst the coffee morning is on.

The Youth Club meets fortnightly on a Friday evening

"Sparklers", a Monday morning mother and toddlers group for youngsters under 4 starting at 9:30 am (joint initiative with Anglican church meeting at St Cuthberts)

- Bible Fellowship - most Wednesdays at 7:30 pm in local homes with fellowship, bible study and prayer

== History of the Methodist Church in Great Glen ==
Dissenters from the Anglican Church emerged in the 18th century. In 1712 there were around 12 Presbyterians, 3 Anabaptists, and 3 Quakers reportedly living in Great Glen and nearby. Between 1714 and 1726 six different houses in Great Glen were licensed as meeting-houses for these dissenters.British History Online

Most of the leading artisan families in Great Glen were Methodist "dissenters", and prominent people in the Wesleyan church congregation included William Edgley - Miller, Thomas Batchelor - Bricklayer, Daniel Allen - Blacksmith, Solomon Banks - Watchmaker, Joseph Smeeton - Framework Knitter, Thomas Smeeton - Carpenter, John Hawley - Grocer, John Haycock - Builder, Robert Holyoak - Tailor, Robert Scampton - Carpenter and William Scott - Tailor.

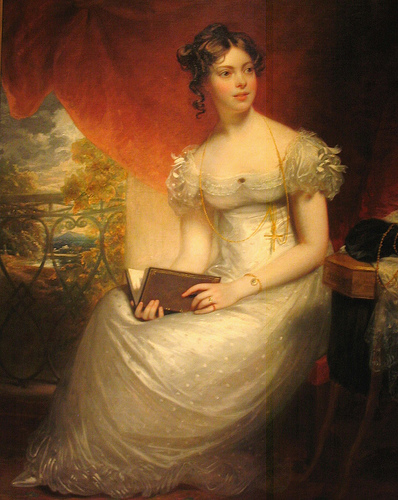
Kitty Packe

Kitty Packe, who was wife of the lord of the manor, was much concerned in the middle of the nineteenth century as to the strength of those dissenting from the established Anglican church, saying "Now I can sympathise with anybody in Dislike to Dissent but I have no dislike of the poor dissenters. I would not willingly let a cottage or a farm to a dissenter, and even for an allotment I would give a preference to a Church (i.e. Anglican) person". Compared to another local village who have a number of agnostics and Independents, she says "I have much reason to be thankful in Great Glen that we only have Wesleyans as dissenters among the poor".

More than concerned and rather more worried about the development of Methodism in Great Glen was an outgoing note to the next incumbent minister at the Anglican Church in 1866 by the vicar Revd HL Dodds, who said "The (Anglican) church is very weak in the parish. The Church people have little zeal especially for missions" . He contrasts his own congregation with the Wesleyans led by the prominent and influential people in the village, noting "The quiet and influential opposition is led by the Haycocks & Mrs Cooper".

In being privileged to count many artisans amongst its congregation, the Methodist Church in Great Glen saw its repairs and refurbishments being often completed voluntarily – and free of charge – by the very craftsmen that would enjoy its surroundings each Sunday.

The church hall was started in 1868 as a drive to house the many children that then needed a Sunday School and completed – no doubt at a very cost-effective price by the many in the congregation who had all the skills to expand their own church. 1876 saw the architect's plans drawn up, and the building was completed and the Sunday School opened only three years later, in 1879.

It would be another 110 years before the next major building work took place to connect the church and the Sunday school and add toilets, a separate entrance and another function room, to be named after a prominent 20th-century member of the church congregation, Ruth Warner, in 1989
