= Newbold Verdon =

Village in Leicestershire, England

Coordinates: 52.629646°N 1.342076°W

- St James's Church, Newbold Verdon

- Location within Leicestershire
- Population: 3,012 (2011 Census)
- District: Hinckley and Bosworth
- Shire county: Leicestershire
- Region: East Midlands
- Country: England
- Sovereign state: United Kingdom
- Post town: LEICESTER
- Postcode district: LE9
- Police: Leicestershire
- Fire: Leicestershire
- Ambulance: East Midlands
- UK Parliament: Hinckley and Bosworth

Newbold Verdon is a village and civil parish in the county of Leicestershire, England. The parish includes Newbold Heath to the north and Brascote to the south. Originally an agricultural centre Newbold Verdon grew in size during the 1850s with the expansion of coal mining in the area. That industry has now ceased leaving Newbold Verdon as a commuter village primarily serving Leicester (9 .5 miles east) and Hinckley (8.5 miles south). The 2001 census recorded a population of 3,193, which had reduced to 3,012 at the 2011 census.

Newbold Verdon is situated on the B582 route between the similar-sized villages of Barlestone and Desford, and is 4 miles (6.4 km) east of the small market town of Market Bosworth.

== Etymology ==
The Domesday Book (1086) records the settlement as Niwebold meaning 'New Build'. It acquired the suffix Verdon from Nicholas de Verdon who owned the manor in 1226. While the civil parish is Newbold Verdon the ecclesiastical parish retains the form Newbold de Verdun. Nicholas's descendant William de Ferrers was born in Newbold in 1332 or 1333.

== History ==
In the itinerary of 1280, Newbold, Brascote, Naneby and Barlestone answered collectively as one village, which contained 80 acres of woodland and a vineyard.

The manor was held in 1401 by Walter Devereux and was later divided through marriage into four parts, with one of these parts going to Henry de Ferrars.

In the year of 1428 the village was quarantined due to an outbreak of cholera, however this was short-lived as the quarantine was lifted soon after the outbreak was found to be non-serious.

In 1625, Sir Thomas Crewe purchased land in Newbold which was eventually passed down to Nathaniel, who was then Lord Crewe, Bishop of Durham.

A part of Newbold was enclosed in 1509, although the main enclosure took place in 1810 when the church was awarded 1,316 acres of glebe land.

Six cottages were built in 1794 for the poor of the parish, with benefaction money and they were also allocated the use of 10 acres of land at the time of the enclosure.

Cob Cottage is probably the oldest remaining home which dates back to 1650.

On Sunday 22 March 2015, the funeral cortège of King Richard III passed through Market Bosworth, Newbold Verdon and Desford en route to his interment in Leicester Cathedral.

== Industry ==
Framework knitters were operating in the village in 1812, and by 1845 over 60 frames were in existence.

By then, coal was being mined in the neighbouring villages and many abandoned their frames and drifted into the mines.

Like many other villages Newbold was almost self supporting having its own tailors, blacksmith and wheelwright, butchers and shoemakers.

It was no problem for the bakers to obtain flour as three windmills operated in the village.

Besides the mill in Mill Lane, a windmill was obtained from Syston in 1812 and was erected on a site near to what is now the Windmill Inn, there was a third mill in Desford Road.

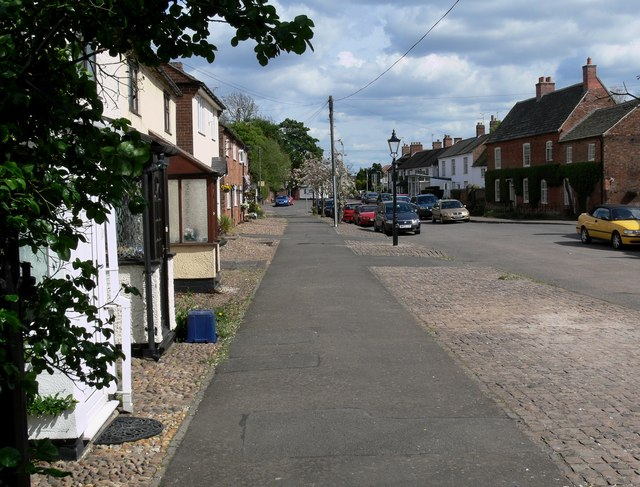
Main Street

== Education ==
The local primary school is in Dragon Lane. The school has one class per cohort and an Autism specific Unit. It has a sensory garden, pond and forest school.

== Churches ==
- St. James's Church (1209)
- A Methodist chapel (1894)
- A Baptist church (1833)

The Bright Hour at the Baptist Church has been running for many years along with the more recently started Grandtots Group.

== Public houses ==
There are two public houses: the Jubilee and the Windmill (which is in Brascote) plus a Social Club which has recently re-opened.

== Sport ==
A short-lived greyhound racing track existed in the village, which started racing on 15 April 1930. The racing was independent (not affiliated to the sports governing body the National Greyhound Racing Club) and was known as a flapping track, which was the nickname given to independent tracks. The exact location of the track is presently unknown.

Newbold hosts a thriving village cricket team playing at various leagues.
