= Oaks in Charnwood =

Hamlet in Leicestershire, England

Coordinates: 52.736°N 1.297°W

Oaks in Charnwood is a hamlet of scattered houses in the English county of Leicestershire within the Charnwood Forest. Oaks in Charnwood is located in and is part of the Civil Parish of Charley in North West Leicestershire. The ecclesiastical Parish of Oaks in Charnwood extends to the north of the Charley civil parish boundary, into the Shepshed civil parish.

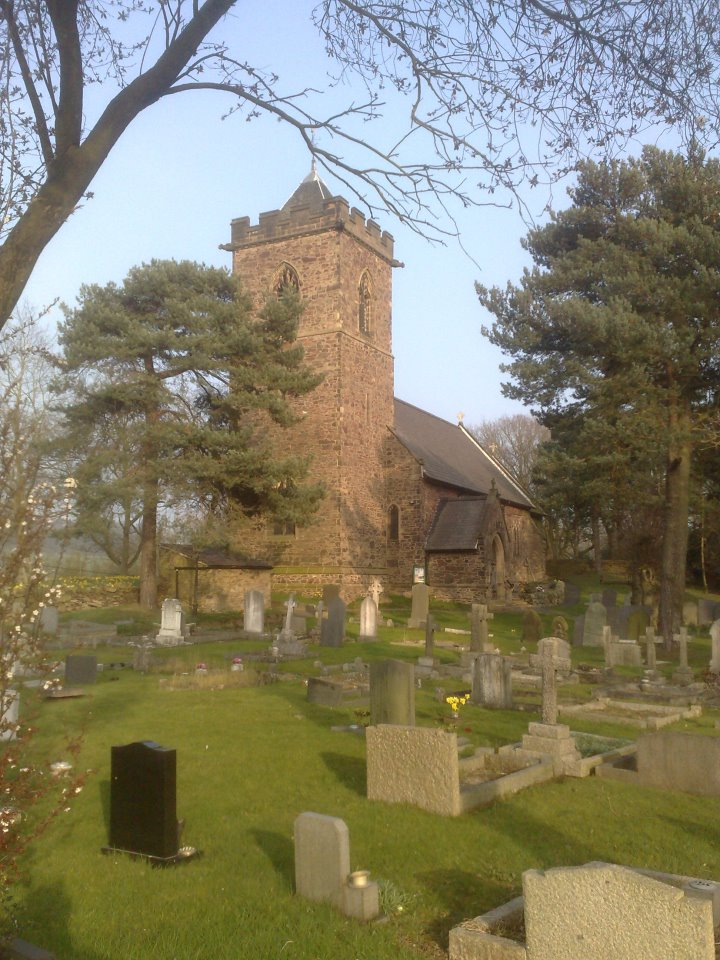
The Oaks Church

The centre of this small hamlet is the Church of St. James the Greater, which lies in a valley.

The church, erected in 1815 and consecrated on the day of Waterloo, was rebuilt and enlarged in 1883, it is of forest stone in the Early English style and has an embattled western tower with a small pyramid roof. A feature of the church is a collection of French lances mounted on the north wall of the church, said to have been retrieved from the field at Waterloo.

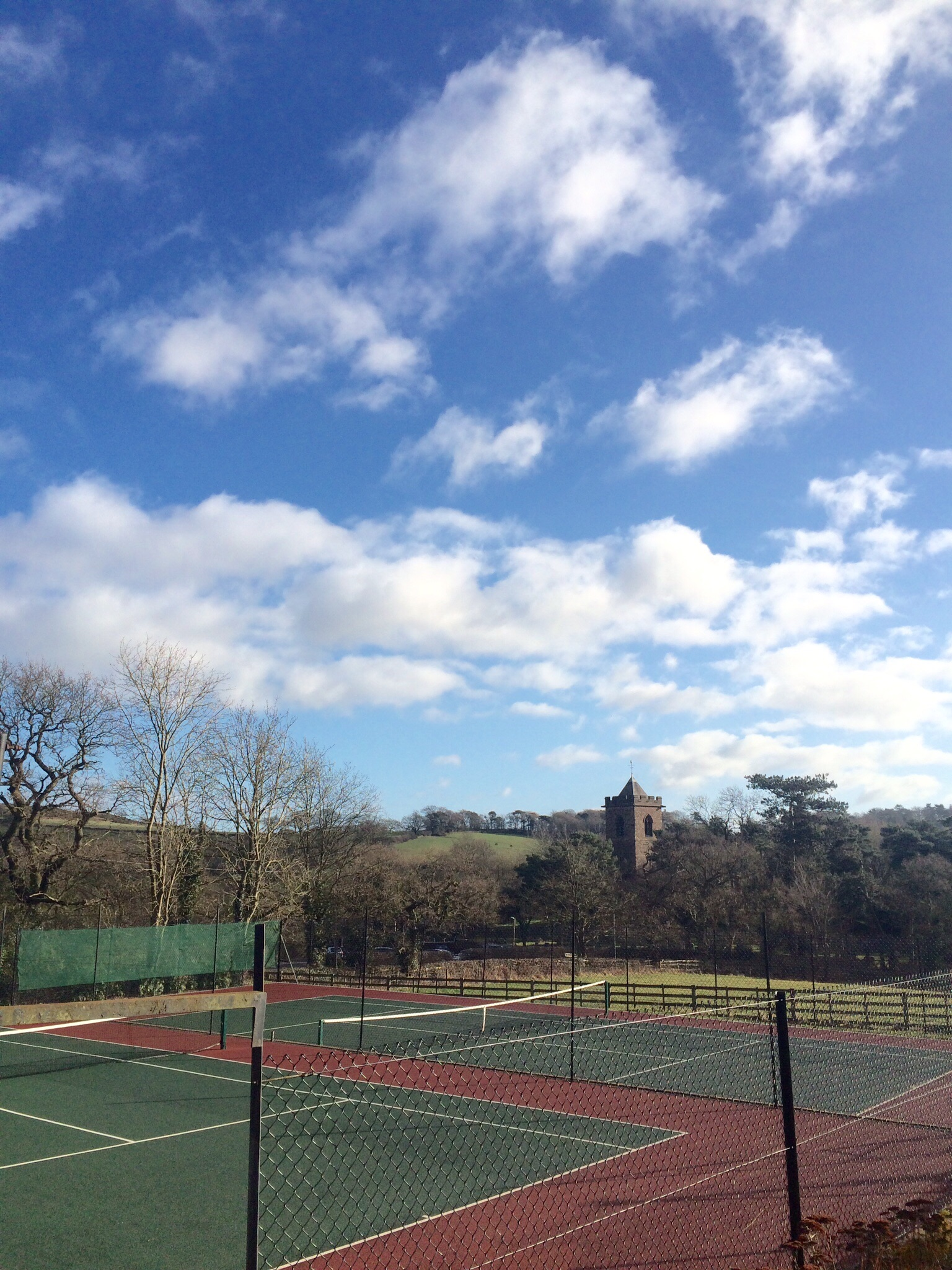
Oaks and District Tennis Club

The church was part of a united benefice with Saint Peter's, Copt Oak. It is linked with the church of Saint Botolph, Shepshed.

Opposite the Church of St. James the Greater is Oaks and District Tennis Club, a not-for-profit club, with three tennis courts.

The Oaks is also the site of a campsite for Scouts.
