= Kilby (name) =

Kilby is both a surname and a given name. Notable people with the name include:

Surname:

- Arthur Forbes Gordon Kilby (1885–1915), English recipient of the Victoria Cross
- Barry Kilby, chairman of Burnley football club, England
- Brian Kilby (born 1938), British marathon runner
- Jack Kilby (1923–2005), American electrical engineer, inventor of the integrated circuit, and Nobel Laureate
- Richard Kilby (1560–1620), English scholar and priest
- Thomas Erby Kilby (1865–1943), Governor of Alabama, US
- Tommy Kilby (born 1964), American politician

Given name:

- Kilby MacDonald (1913–1986), hockey player
- Kilby Snow (1905–1980), American musician
