= Smeeton Westerby =

Village in Leicestershire, England

Coordinates: 52.5531°N 1.0873°W

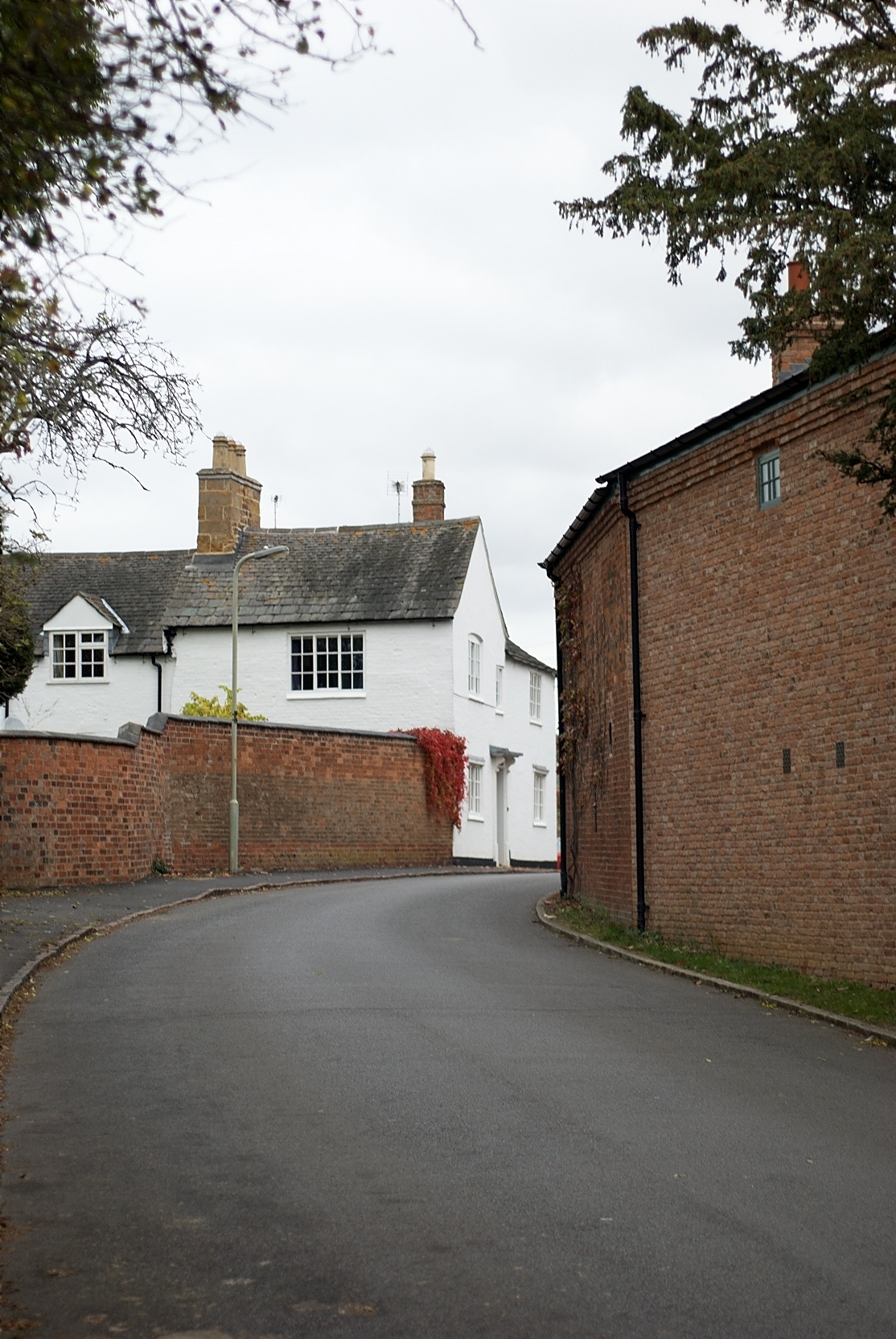
- Main Street (2009)

- Location within Leicestershire
- Area: 2.1697 sq mi (5.619 km^{2})
- Population: 357 (2011)
  - Density: 165/sq mi (64/km^{2})
- OS grid reference: SP677955
  - London: 79.42 mi (127.81 km) SE
- Civil parish: Smeeton Westerby
- District: Harborough
- Shire county: Leicestershire
- Region: East Midlands
- Country: England
- Sovereign state: United Kingdom
- Post town: LEICESTER
- Postcode district: LE8
- Dialling code: 0116
- Police: Leicestershire
- Fire: Leicestershire
- Ambulance: East Midlands
- UK Parliament: Harborough, Oadby and Wigston
- Website: Smeeton Westerby Parish Council

Smeeton Westerby is a village and civil parish in the Harborough district of Leicestershire, England, located 9.38 miles (15 km) south-east of Leicester, 1.31 miles (2 km) northeast of Saddington, 1.15 miles (2 km) south of Kibworth Harcourt, 2.49 miles (4 km) west of West Langton, and 500m north of the Grand Union canal. Smeeton Westerby is approximately 5.11 miles (8 km) from the nearest railway station which is located in Market Harborough. The closest area for shops is Kibworth Beauchamp, which is 0.7 miles (1 km) due north of Smeeton Westerby. Smeeton Westerby has no shops of its own but it does have a traditional village pub, a village hall, a parish church and several stables and farms.

== History ==
In 1870-72, John Marius Wilson's Imperial Gazetteer of England and Wales described Smeeton Westerby as:

"…a township-chapelry in Kibworth-Beauchamp parish, Leicester; ½ a mile S of Kibworth r. station, 1 NE of the Grand Union canal, and 5¼ NW of Market -Harborough. Post town, Kibworth-Harcourt, under Leicester. Real property, £3,293. Pop., 533. Houses, 114. The property is much subdivided. The canal here burst its banks in Sept. 1865, and was emptied for a distance of 10 miles. The living is a rectory in the diocese of Peterborough. Value, £200. Patron, the Rector of Kibworth. The church was built in 1849."

Originally Smeeton and Westerby were two separate hamlets of Smeeton and Westerby but they merged some time ago to become the village that it is today. The occupation in Smeeton Westerby has changed considerably over the last 130 years. The Vision of Britain website shows the main occupations in 1881 was domestic services for women and agriculture for men. As it is a conservation village there has been little change to the size of the village throughout its history apart from the small developments on the former factory site and Mill Lane. In 1975 an ancient burial site of the Beaker people was discovered just outside the village.

== Places of interest ==
=== Church ===
The local parish church in Smeeton Westerby is an important part in the local community. The church not only acts as a place of worship but a place that encourages the local community which makes the village cohesive. For instance, every first Thursday the Church runs a pram club, this is for pre-school children and their carers and includes activities such as crafts, songs and refreshments. The church was consecrated on 31 August 1849 and was designed by Henry Woodyer an architect of the Oxford movement and a graduate of Merton College.

== Demographics ==
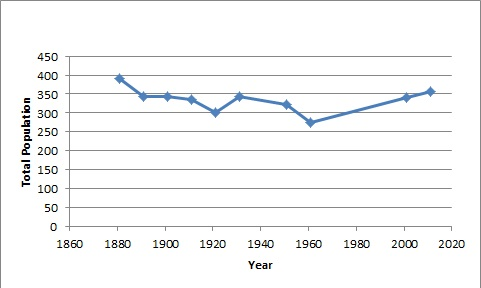
Total population of Smeeton Westerby Civil Parish, as reported by the Census of Population from 1881 to 2011.

=== Population ===
The initial census data for Smeeton Westerby given on the Vision of Britain website was 390 for the population in 1881. For the next 40 years the pattern of total population decreased, in 1921 the population of Smeeton Westerby was 302. There was a boom in population the following 10 years and in 1931 the population had increased to 343. The population dropped in 1961 the total population stood at 275, the lowest it had ever been. In 2001 the total population was 340 and in 2011 it had again increased to 357 according to the 2011 census.

=== Religion ===
According to the 2001 census, 281 out of 357 people in the Parish (78.7%) were Christian, this is above the national average of 59.3% (33.2 million people). The second highest religion was no religion, which showed 44 people (12.3%) of the population.

=== Occupation ===
According to the Vision of Britain website in 1881, the primary occupation was unknown for females, this may have been because at this time the majority of women were unemployed. For females, apart from unknown occupation the highest occupation was Domestic Service or Offices. (Prior to that, the general occupation was as Frame Work Knitters). In 1881 the majority of males in Smeeton Westerby either worked in Workers in Dress or Agriculture as they both scored the same of 30 people. In the 2001 census out of a possible 178 people in employment, 41 people were working in manufacturing of this roughly 73% were male. Manufacturing also scored individually the highest employment sector for males in 2001. The most common occupation for females in Smeeton Westerby in 2001 was working in real estate, renting and business activities, this employed 16 out of 77 females. In the 2011 census the total number of the population in employment decreased to 172 people. The largest employment sector was repair of motor vehicles and motor cycles of which 26 people were currently working. However, only just over the majority of people who worked in this employment sector were male (58%). In 2011 the highest employment sector for males was manufacturing which 17 out of 95 males worked in. The highest employment sector for females was employment in education which 16 out of 77 females worked in.

=== Housing ===
The first census to report how people were housed was in 1891. However the question and information given was very limited and the only statistics gathered were the number of rooms and the number of people in each household. This changed from 1951 onwards, as the census reports became more detailed and more questions were asked about amenities. In 1951 these "amenities" were measured by piped water, a cooking stove, a kitchen sink, a water closet (meaning a flush toilet) and a fixed bath. The total number of houses has changed over the years in Smeeton Westerby, but not dramatically, in 1881 the total number of houses was 99, this fell to 85 in 1901. The houses then very gradually increased, in 1951 the total number was 100, in 1961 it was 98 houses and in 2001 it was 144. Finally in the 2011 census the number of houses was 154 showing that the number of houses in Smeeton Westerby is increasing more rapidly.

== Transport ==
While no train station serves Smeeton Westerby itself, four train stations are located within ten miles of the village. The nearest railway station is Market Harborough, which is 5.11 miles (8 km) south-east of Smeeton Westerby. South Wigston is 6.71 miles (11 km) north-west of Smeeton Westerby, Leicester is 8.86 miles (14 km) north-west and Narborough is 9.01 miles (15 km) west of Smeeton Westerby.
