= Countesthorpe =

Village in Leicestershire, England

Coordinates: 52.555°N 1.14°W

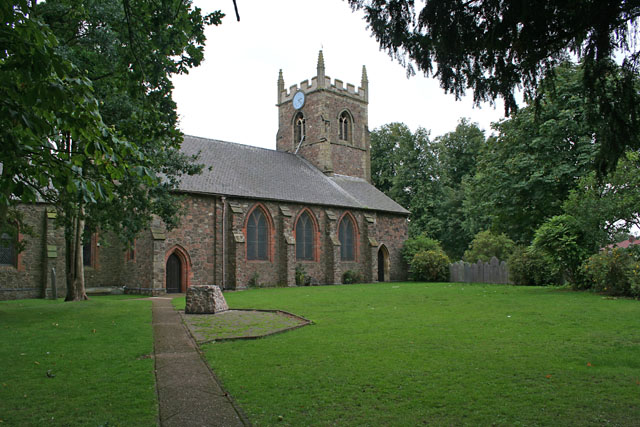
- St Andrew's Church, Countesthorpe

- Location within Leicestershire
- Population: 6,377 (2011)
- OS grid reference: SP585954
- District: Blaby
- Shire county: Leicestershire
- Region: East Midlands
- Country: England
- Sovereign state: United Kingdom
- Post town: Leicester
- Postcode district: LE8
- Dialling code: 0116
- Police: Leicestershire
- Fire: Leicestershire
- Ambulance: East Midlands
- UK Parliament: Blaby

Countesthorpe is a large village and civil parish in the Leicestershire district of Blaby, with a population of 6,393 (2001 census, falling slightly to 6,377 at the 2011 census. It lies to the south of Leicester, and is about 6 miles (9.7 km) from the city centre, but only two miles south of the suburb of South Wigston. Nearby places are Blaby and South Wigston to the north, Kilby to the east, Peatling Magna and Willoughby Waterleys to the south, and Broughton Astley, Cosby and Whetstone to the west.

The name Countesthorpe originates from the 11th century when the area was part of the marriage dowry of the Countess Judith, niece of William the Conqueror. The 'thorpe' part of the name is a variant of the Middle English word thorp, meaning hamlet or small village.

The parish church of St. Andrew was started in 1220 by the family of Lord William of Ludbrook. It was restored in 1840 and again in 1907. The 14th-century tower still remains.

The village has three public houses: The Axe and Square, The Bull's Head and The Railway. Another public house, the King William IV was turned into a Tesco Express in 2013. Magna 73 of the Leicestershire Senior League are an association football team who play just north of the village.

The village is twinned with the town of Mennecy in France.

== Education ==
Countesthorpe is served by one local primary school called Greenfield Primary School. The school achieved a rating of "good" in its 2010, 2014 and 2018 Ofsted reports.

Until September 2016 Countesthorpe had a separate high school named Leysland High School, with Ofsted reviewing it as "outstanding" in 2013, as well as a college called Countesthorpe Community College. Both schools were attended by members of the music group Kasabian. The two schools merged to become Countesthorpe Leysland Community College, which was subsequently renamed Countesthorpe Academy in 2020. The combined school was scored as "inadequate" in 2019.

== Notable residents ==
- Harvey Barnes - Professional footballer
- William Buckingham, First World War recipient of the Victoria Cross.
- Rosemary Conley – author and broadcaster on exercise and health.
- Robert Gee, recipient of the Victoria Cross and a Conservative MP.
- Ahmed Musa – Professional footballer.
- Maurice Tompkin – first class cricketer and professional footballer.
