= Wistow, Leicestershire =

Civil parish in Leicestershire, England

Coordinates: 52.5582802°N 1.0529135°W

Wistow
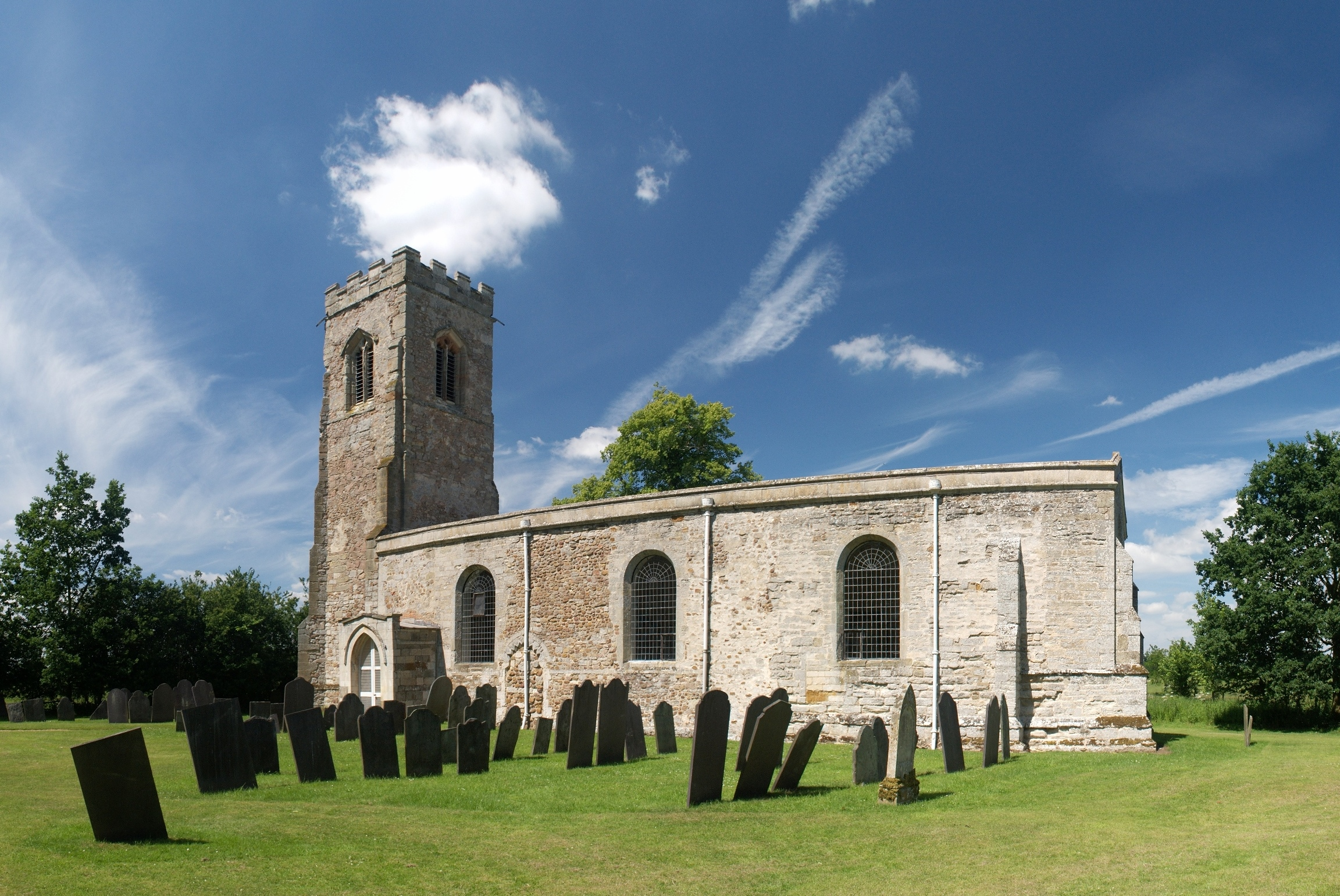
- St Wistan's church, Wistow

- Location within Leicestershire
- Area: 1.421875 sq mi (3.68264 km^{2})
- Population: 62 (2011)
  - Density: 44/sq mi (17/km^{2})
- OS grid reference: SP643960
  - London: 82 mi (132 km)
- Civil parish: Wistow
- District: Harborough
- Shire county: Leicestershire
- Region: East Midlands
- Country: England
- Sovereign state: United Kingdom
- Post town: LEICESTER
- Postcode district: LE8
- Dialling code: 0116
- Police: Leicestershire
- Fire: Leicestershire
- Ambulance: East Midlands
- UK Parliament: Harborough
- Website: Wistow cum Newton Harcourt Parish Council

Wistow is a deserted medieval village and civil parish in the Harborough district, in the English county of Leicestershire, and lies seven miles south-east of the city of Leicester in the valley of the River Sence. Since 1 April 1936 it has included most of the former civil parish of Newton Harcourt which was a chapelry of Wistow. The population of the civil parish at the 2011 census was 256.

The village was named as Wistanestou in the Domesday Book and is thought to derive from Wigstan (OE male personal name) + OE stow 'a holy place'; 'The holy place of Wigstan'. It is thought to be the site of the martyrdom of Saint Wigstan, a Mercian prince. Wistow was part of the royal multiple estate of aet Glenne (Great Glen). Wistow is listed in the Domesday book of 1086 as a settlement of many households owned by Robert the bursar.

== St Wistan's Church ==
The present structure, which dates from the 12th century, was enlarged c. 1300, again altered in the 14th and 15th centuries, and remodelled in the 18th century. The church of St Wistan consists of nave and chancel under one roof, south porch, west tower, vestry, and north chapel. It is built of rubble, chiefly ironstone, with some limestone dressings, and lead roofs. It is a Grade II* listed building.

== Wistow Hall ==
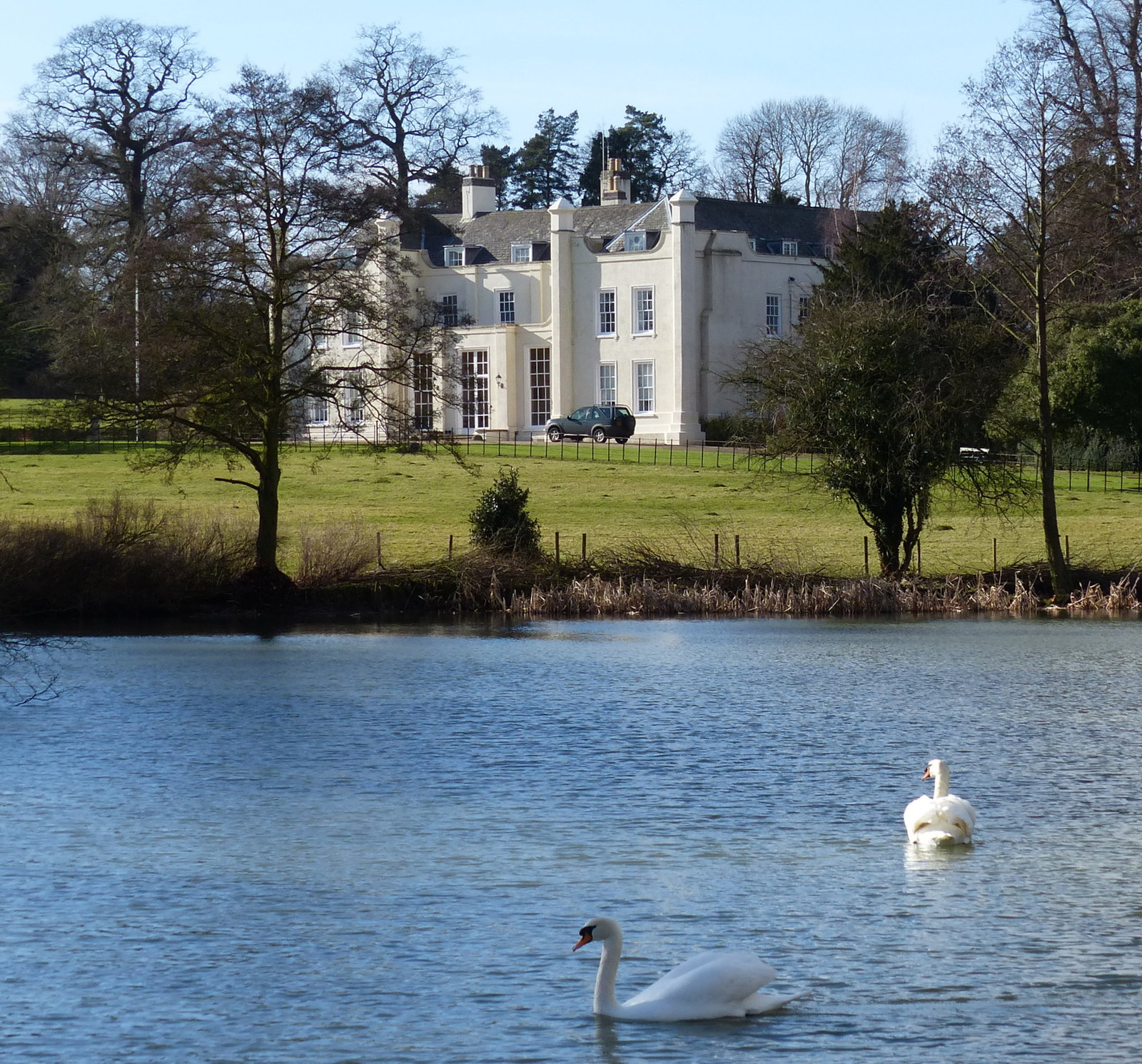
Lake next to Wistow Hall in 2014

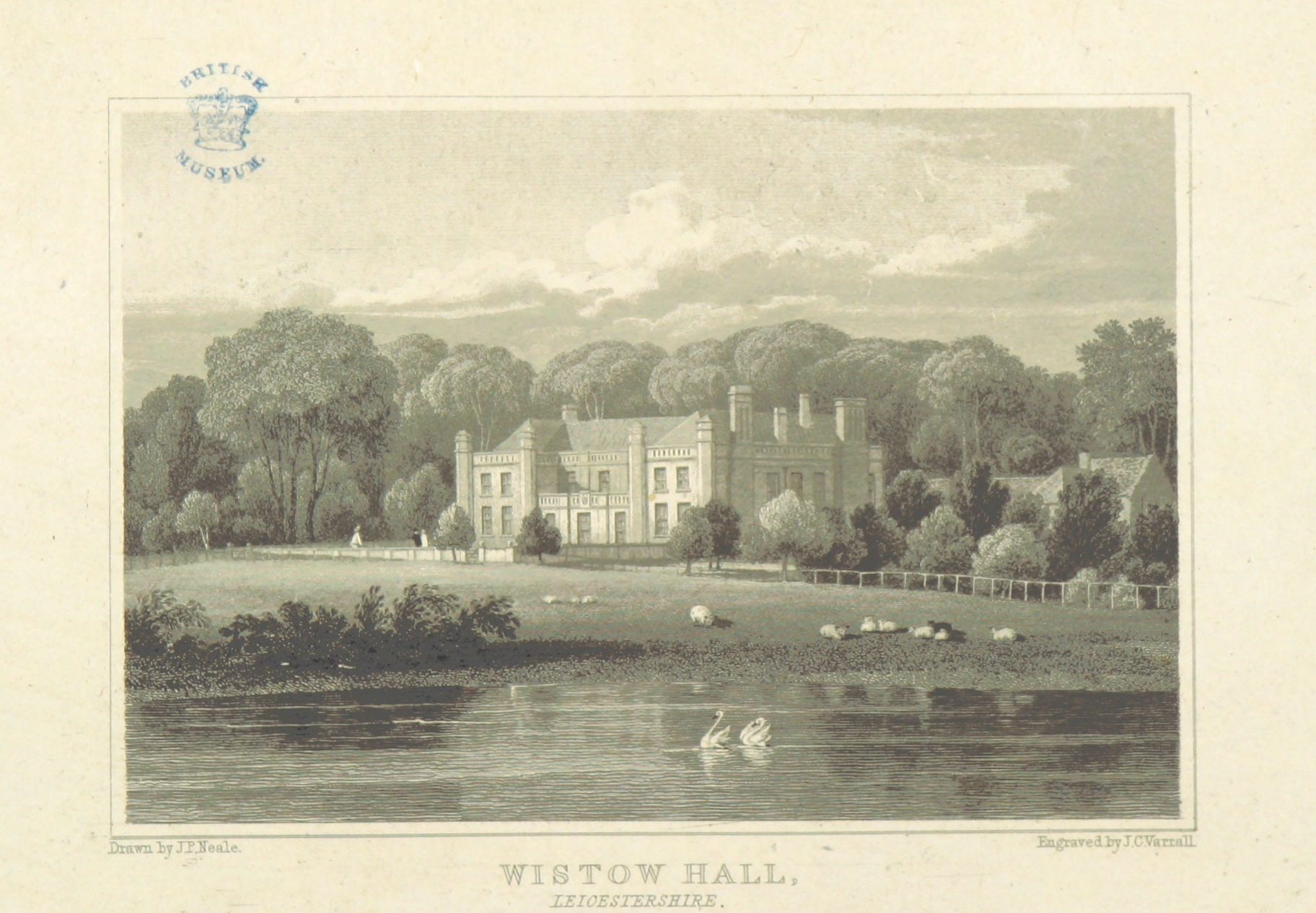
Wistow Hall in 1818

Wistow Hall, which may be built on or near the site of the earlier medieval house, retains the form of a large house of early-17th-century date. It consists of two stories with attics, built of red brick with stone dressings and now completely stuccoed on all sides. The original plan appears to have been H-shaped consisting of a central hall between two cross-wings which extended westwards to enclose a rear court. Then, as now, the principal front faced east with a central entrance, while the south wing contained the parlour rooms and the north wing the kitchen and service rooms. The map of 1632 shows the house with its H-plan having two three-storied tower-like features with pyramidal roofs standing at the front of each wing on their outer sides. Formal gardens are also shown to the south and east of the house.

During work on the house in 1960 certain early features were exposed; these included stone dressings in the rear wall of the hall marking the position of a large lateral chimney stack, and a blocked north window and quoins in the existing west wall of the house apparently surviving from a former south extension of the kitchen wing. The first-floor rooms in the north wing have reset panelling of the 17th century and more of a similar date is preserved piecemeal in the attic rooms. One stone doorway with a Tudor head remains in the side wall of the south wing. The multi-gabled appearance of the house with finials, kneelers, and large lateral stacks remained more or less unaltered until after the end of the 18th century.

Little work appears to have been done to the house between 1783 and 1814. In 1814, the building was in poor condition and subsequently underwent a drastic remodelling: this involved removing the gables on the north, south, and east sides and substituting hipped slate roofs with dormer windows set behind a tall parapet. A large glass hot-house was added at the south-west corner of the house in 1819 which has since been demolished. Later in the 19th century the same side of the house received two semi-circular bay windows, the work of the second Sir Henry Halford, who was also responsible for laying out a small formal garden. The rococo decoration in the south wing is probably of this period. In 1912 and the following years the balustrade and parapet were removed and additional dormer windows were provided, and in 1960 parts of the house were converted into five self-contained flats. The interior has few features of distinction, but the fine wrought-iron staircase balustrade built in the inner hall by Sir Charles Halford is similar in design to the wrought-iron gates of the Halford chapel in the church. Wistow Hall was Grade II* listed in 1951.

== Present day ==
Today, Wistow is notable as the location of a rural crafts and garden centre and of a maze.
