= Newton Harcourt =

Village in Leicestershire, England

Coordinates: 52.566179°N 1.058571°W

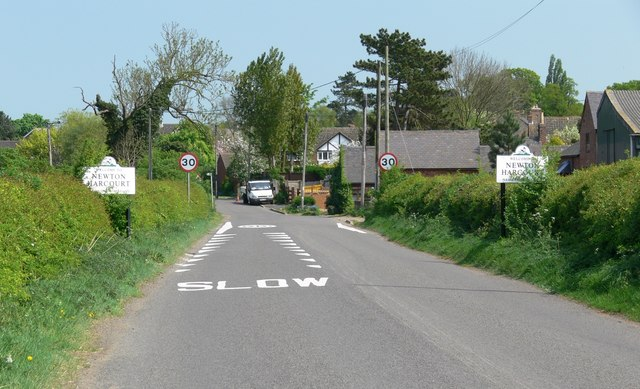
- Newton Harcourt

- Location within Leicestershire
- Area: 1.785937 sq mi (4.62556 km^{2})
- Population: 194 (2011)
  - Density: 109/sq mi (42/km^{2})
- OS grid reference: SP639969
  - London: 82 mi (132 km)
- Civil parish: Wistow
- District: Harborough
- Shire county: Leicestershire
- Region: East Midlands
- Country: England
- Sovereign state: United Kingdom
- Post town: LEICESTER
- Postcode district: LE8
- Dialling code: 0116
- Police: Leicestershire
- Fire: Leicestershire
- Ambulance: East Midlands
- UK Parliament: Harborough, Oadby and Wigston
- Website: Wistow cum Newton Harcourt Parish Council

Newton Harcourt is a village in the civil parish of Wistow, in the Harborough district, in the English county of Leicestershire, and lies 7 miles south-east of the city of Leicester on the northern ridge of the River Sence valley.

== Geography ==
The village is situated on the northern ridge of the River Sence valley. The whole village is situated on Oadby Member Till that is underpinned by two Lower Jurassic bedrock geology Formations; Blue Lias mudstone (55-120 million years old) to the western half of the village, and Charmouth Mudstone (105-180 million years old) to the eastern half. The superficial deposits of the Oadby Member Till give way to Thrussington Member Till as you head south down into the Sence valley beyond St Luke's Church. Newton Harcourt is divided from its church by the Grand Union Canal's Leicester Arm and the Midland Main Line railway, both of which pass to the south of the main settlement.

== History ==
The oldest feature of the village will be St Luke's Church, originally a chapel, is a Grade II* listed building, with parts of its structure dating back to the 13th century. Other listed structures include: Hurst's Farmhouse, the Manor House, and the entrance gateway with Lodge, attached outbuilding and garden walls to the Manor House are all Grade II listed.

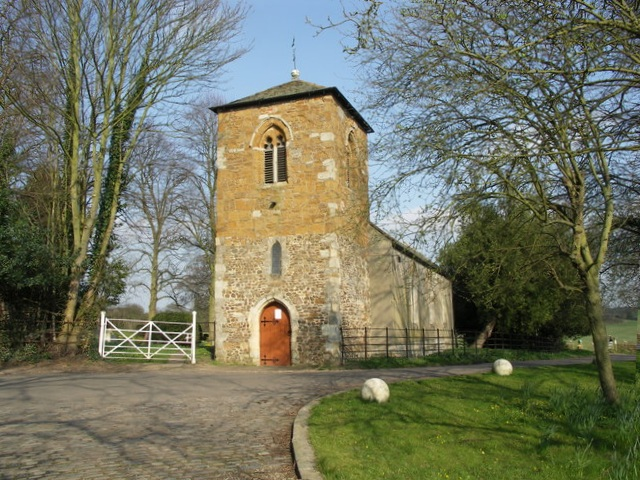
St Luke's Church

Newton Harcourt was formerly a township and chapelry in Wistow parish, from 1866 Newton Harcourt was a civil parish in its own right until it was abolished on 1 April 1936 and merged with Wistow, part also went to Oadby. In 1931 the parish had a population of 142.
