= River Sence, Wigston =

River in east Leicestershire, England

Coordinates: 52.5818°N 1.1871°W

River Sence
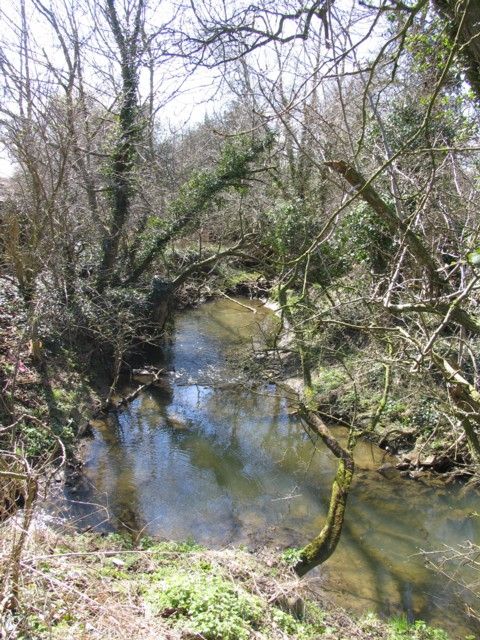
- The river, just north of Great Glen.

Location
- Country: England

Physical characteristics
- Mouth
  - location: River Soar

The River Sence is a Leicestershire (England) tributary of the larger River Soar. The River Sence can be traced eastwards up to the village of Billesdon, and then flows south west through Great Glen, and then west (south of Wigston and South Wigston) until the confluence with the River Soar just to the west of Blaby and south of Glen Parva. Tracing the River Sence upstream, the Environment Agency does monitor the river between Blaby and Great Glen, but there has been no significant flooding in recent years, until 6 January 2025 when it reached a record height. The land along the River Sence is largely agricultural. In 1881 Sebastian Evans wrote that the usual names for this river were Billesdon Brook and Burton Brook which are in fact two of its major tributaries.

The river flows past South Wigston at a point known locally as Crow Mills. After heavy rain the river level here rises quickly. It floods neighbouring fields and then flows across the road causing the road to become impassable to traffic. After prolonged rain the river floods large areas of farm land along its course. At village of Blaby it floods across the cricket pitch and also it can flood across the Leicester Road under the Leicester to Birmingham railway bridge. This can cause significant disruption to local traffic. Over recent years the maintenance on the river appears to have been reduced. It can often be seen choked with weeds and other vegetation.

== The flooding of the Soar Valley ==
As a tributary of the River Soar, The River Sence in the Blaby and Wigston area suffers from persistent flooding.

In the mid 1800s, the railway viaduct at Crow Mill was swept away in a storm and subsequent floods. The destroyed wooden structure was replaced by a steel and brick construction to restore the main railway line. However, in the 1960s it was dismantled when the line was closed as part of the branch line cuts proposed by Dr Beeching.

The road at Crow Mill still suffers closures through flooding, as does the road between Blaby (Northfield Park) and Glen Parva, due to the River Sence bursting its banks.
