= List of places in Leicestershire =

Some of the larger settlements of Leicestershire.

This is a list of towns, villages, and other locations within the ceremonial county of Leicestershire, England.

== A ==
- Ab Kettleby
- Abbots Oak
- Acresford
- Albert Village
- Allexton
- Anstey
- Appleby Magna
- Appleby Parva
- Arnesby
- Asfordby
- Asfordby Hill
- Asfordby Valley
- Ashby-de-la-Zouch
- Ashby-de-la-Zouch Canal
- Ashby de la Zouch Castle
- Ashby Folville
- Ashby Magna
- Ashby Parva
- Ashby Woulds
- Aston Flamville
- Atterton
- Aylestone

== B ==
- Bagworth
- Bardon
- Barkby
- Barkby Thorpe
- Barkestone-le-Vale
- Barlestone
- Barrow upon Soar
- Barsby
- Barton in the Beans
- Barwell
- Battleflat
- Battram
- Beaumont Leys
- Bede Island
- Beeby
- Belcher's Bar
- Belgrave
- Belton
- Belvoir
- Belvoir Castle
- Belvoir Gardens
- Bescaby
- Billesdon
- Bilstone
- Birstall
- Bittesby
- Bitteswell
- Blaby
- Blackfordby
- Blaston
- Boothorpe
- Botcheston
- Bottesford
- Boundary
- Bradgate Park
- Branston
- Brascote
- Braunstone
- Breedon on the Hill
- Brentingby
- Bringhurst
- Brooksby
- Broughton Astley
- Bruntingthorpe
- Buckminster
- Bull in Oak
- Burbage
- Burrough on the Hill
- Burton Lazars
- Burton on the Wolds
- Burton Overy
- Bushby

== C ==
- Cadeby
- Carlton
- Carlton Curlieu
- Castle Donington
- Catthorpe
- Cavendish Bridge
- Chadwell
- Charley
- Chilcote
- Church Langton
- Clarendon Park
- Claybrooke Magna
- Claybrooke Parva
- Coalville
- Cold Newton
- Cold Overton
- Coleorton
- Coleorton Moor
- Congerstone
- Copt Oak
- Cosby
- Cossington
- Coston
- Cotes
- Cotesbach
- Cotes-de-Val
- Coton
- Countesthorpe
- Cranoe
- Croft
- Cropston
- Cross in Hand
- Croxton Kerrial

== D ==
- Dadlington
- Dane Hills
- Desford
- Diseworth
- Dishley
- Donington le Heath
- Donisthorpe
- Drayton
- Drayton-in-the-Clay
- Dunton Bassett

== E ==
- Earl Shilton
- East Goscote
- East Langton
- East Norton
- Easthorpe
- Eastwell
- Eaton
- Edmondthorpe
- Ellistown
- Elmesthorpe
- Enderby
- Evington
- Evington Valley
- Eye Kettleby
- Eyres Monsell

== F ==
- Far Coton
- Farm Town
- Fenny Drayton
- Field Head
- Fleckney
- Fosse Shopping Park
- Foston
- Foxton
- Foxton Locks
- Freeby
- Frisby
- Frisby on the Wreake
- Frog Island
- Frolesworth

== G ==
- Gaddesby
- Garthorpe
- Gaulby
- Gelsmoor
- Gilmorton
- Glen Hills
- Glen Magna
- Glen Parva
- Glenfield
- Glooston
- Goadby
- Goadby Marwood
- Goodwood
- Gopsall
- Grace-Dieu
- Great Bowden
- Great Dalby
- Great Easton
- Great Glen
- Great Stretton
- Greenhill
- Griffydam
- Grimston
- Groby
- Grove Park
- Gumley

== H ==
- Hallaton
- Halstead
- Hamilton
- Harby
- Harston
- Hathern
- Heather
- Heathley Park
- Hemington
- Higham on the Hill
- Highfields
- Hinckley
- Hoby
- Holwell
- Horninghold
- Hose
- Hoton
- Houghton on the Hill
- Hugglescote
- Humberstone
- Huncote
- Hungarton
- Husbands Bosworth

== I ==
- Ibstock
- Illston
- Illston on the Hill
- Ingarsby
- Isley Walton
- Isley Woodhouse

== J ==
- John O'Gaunt

== K ==
- Kegworth
- Keyham
- Keythorpe
- Kibworth Beauchamp
- Kibworth Harcourt
- Kilby
- Kilby Bridge
- Kimcote
- King's Mills
- Kings Norton
- Kirby Bellars
- Kirby Fields
- Kirby Muxloe
- Kirkby Mallory
- Knaptoft
- Knighton
- Knipton
- Knossington

== L ==
- Langley Priory
- Laughton
- Launde
- Leesthorpe
- Leicester
- Leicester Castle
- Leicester Forest East
- Leicester Forest West
- Leire
- Lindley
- Little Bowden
- Little Dalby
- Little Orton
- Little Stretton
- Little Twycross
- Littlethorpe
- Lockington
- Loddington
- Long Clawson
- Long Whatton
- Loughborough
- Lount
- Lowesby
- Lubenham
- Lutterworth

== M ==
- Magna Park
- Marefield
- Market Bosworth
- Market Harborough
- Markfield
- Measham
- Medbourne,
- Melton Mowbray
- Misterton
- Moira
- Mountsorrel
- Mount St Bernard
- Mowmacre Hill
- Mowsley
- Muston

== N ==
- Nailstone
- Nanpantan
- Narborough
- Nether Broughton
- Nevill Holt
- Newbold, Harborough
- Newbold, North West Leicestershire
- Newbold Verdon
- Newton Burgoland
- Newton Harcourt
- Newtown Linford
- Newtown Unthank
- Normanton
- Normanton le Heath
- Norris Hill
- North Evington
- North Kilworth
- Norton juxta Twycross
- Noseley

== O ==
- Oadby
- Oakthorpe
- Odstone
- Old Dalby
- Orton on the Hill
- Osbaston
- Osbaston Hollow
- Osgathorpe
- Owston

== P ==
- Packington
- Peatling Magna
- Peatling Parva
- Peckleton
- Pickwell
- Pinwall
- Plungar
- Potters Marston
- Prestwold
- Primethorpe
- Packingshire

== Q ==
- Queniborough
- Quorn

== R ==
- Ragdale
- Ratby
- Ratcliffe Culey
- Ratcliffe on the Wreake
- Ravenstone
- Rearsby
- Redmile
- River Soar
- Rolleston
- Rotherby
- Rothley

== S ==
- Saddington
- Saltby
- Sapcote
- Saxby
- Saxelby
- Scalford
- Scraptoft
- Seagrave
- Sewstern
- Shackerstone
- Shangton
- Sharnford
- Shawell
- Shearsby
- Sheepy Magna
- Sheepy Parva
- Shenton
- Shepshed
- Shoby
- Sibson
- Sileby
- Six Hills
- Skeffington
- Sketchley
- Slawston
- Smeeton Westerby
- Smockington
- Snarestone
- Snibston
- Soar Valley
- Somerby
- South Croxton
- South Kilworth
- South Knighton
- South Wigston
- Sproxton
- Stanford Hall
- Stanton under Bardon
- Stapleford
- Stapleton
- Staunton Harold
- Stathern
- Stockerston
- Stoke Golding
- Stonesby
- Stoney Stanton
- Stoneygate
- Stonton Wyville
- Stoughton
- Stretton en le Field
- Stretton Magna
- Stretton Parva
- Sutton Cheney
- Sutton in the Elms
- Swannington
- Swepstone
- Swinford
- Swithland
- Sysonby
- Syston

== T ==
- Theddingworth
- Thornton
- Thorpe Acre
- Thorpe Arnold
- Thorpe Astley
- Thorpe Langton
- Thorpe Satchville
- Thringstone
- Thrussington
- Thurcaston
- Thurlaston
- Thurmaston
- Thurnby
- Tilton on the Hill
- Tonge
- Tugby
- Tur Langton
- Twycross
- Twyford

== U ==
- Ullesthorpe
- Ulverscroft
- Upper Bruntingthorpe
- Upton

== V ==
- Vale of Belvoir

== W ==
- Walcote
- Waltham on the Wolds
- Walton
- Walton on the Wolds
- Wanlip
- Wartnaby
- Welham
- Wellsborough
- Whatborough
- Whetstone
- Whitwick
- Wigston Fields
- Wigston Magna
- Wigston Parva
- Willoughby Waterleys
- Wilson
- Wistow
- Withcote
- Witherley
- Woodhouse
- Woodhouse Eaves
- Woodthorpe
- Worthington
- Wycomb
- Wyfordby
- Wykin
- Wymeswold
- Wymondham

== See also ==
- List of settlements in Leicestershire by population
- List of places in England
