= Snarestone =

Village in Leicestershire, England

Coordinates: 52.6821°N 1.4888°W

- Location within Leicestershire
- Population: 318 (2021 Census)
- OS grid reference: SK345095
- District: North West Leicestershire
- Shire county: Leicestershire
- Region: East Midlands
- Country: England
- Sovereign state: United Kingdom
- Post town: SWADLINCOTE
- Postcode district: DE12
- Dialling code: 01530
- Police: Leicestershire
- Fire: Leicestershire
- Ambulance: East Midlands
- UK Parliament: Hinckley and Bosworth

Snarestone is a small rural village in North West Leicestershire, England.

It lies on the edge of the National Forest and is 5 miles (8 km) from the market town of Ashby-de-la-Zouch. It has a population of approximately 300 people and 120 households, increasing to a population of 312 in 128 households at the 2011 census.

The village is surrounded by farmland and open countryside. It is positioned at the foot of a slight hill that gently rises to a height of 115 metres. Other topographical features include the River Mease and the terminus for the Ashby Canal. Both of these waterways are sites of special scientific interest (SSSI). Based on the 2011 census data, it is the centre of population density for the island of Great Britain.

== Village Features ==
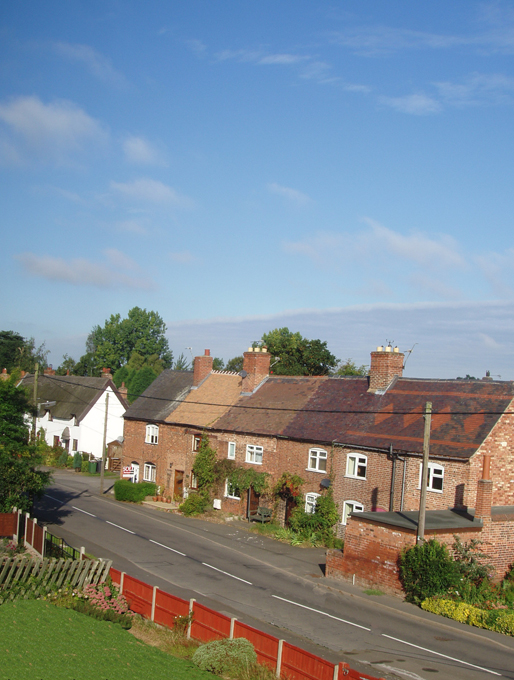
View down Main Street in Snarestone village (looking toward Appleby Magna)

Although Snarestone is a Leicestershire village it has a Derby postcode and is 3 miles (5 km) from the county boundary of North Warwickshire. The village has an active Parish Council that meets throughout the year and publishes a regular newsletter.

Snarestone's amenities include two public houses, a primary school, a church, a blacksmiths, an antique reclamation yard, an allotment, a post box and a traditional red telephone kiosk.

The village has various types of housing from thatched roof cottages, semi-detached houses, self-contained flats to large detached properties, complete with private tennis courts. Most settlements in the village extend along Main Road and Quarry Lane. There is another minor road (Derby Lane) that connects to neighbouring Shackerstone.

The village is served by an ADSL enabled telephone exchange that is capable of providing broadband access to the internet at speeds of up to 80 Mbit/s.

Refuse and recycling collections take place on a bi-weekly rota and a mobile public library makes regular stops in the village on alternate Fridays.

The area to the south of Snarestone is Crown Estate land and belongs to (but is not the private property of) the British Monarch. Much of this land is agricultural and is the site of a former Georgian country house (Gopsall Hall). It is reputed that George Frideric Handel composed his Messiah oratorio here in 1741.

== Transport ==
Snarestone is 2 miles (3 km) from junction 11 of the M42 motorway and is less than 30 miles (48 km) from the five surrounding cities of Birmingham, Leicester, Nottingham, Coventry, and Derby.

Other nearby roads include the A444 that runs to Coventry and the B4116 Ashby Road to Atherstone.

East Midlands Airport is situated 13 miles (21 km) to the north and Birmingham Airport lies 23 miles (37 km) to the south.

There is also a bus from Measham to Fenny Drayton which runs through Snarestone and provides connections to Shackerstone, Atherstone and Twycross. The bus though is not frequent with only 6 services both ways each day except Sunday.

There was also a railway station on the Ashby and Nuneaton Joint Railway but it was closed in 1931 and to freight in 1970. The nearest railway stations are Atherstone, Hinckley and Leicester. There is also a section of the former line still open from Shackerstone to Shenton via Market Bosworth known as the Battlefield Line. There was at one time interest expressed to reopen a new station at Snarestone on the Battlefield Line to serve Measham and the newly restored Ashby Canal. This has since been abandoned due to costs and the land being privately owned. Only the goods shed and station masters house remain as private residence.

== Ashby Canal ==
Snarestone is linked via the Ashby Canal to the national network of canals. The canal passes under the village in a tunnel and currently terminates at Snarestone wharf just to the north, pending further restoration of the canal to Measham and Moira. The 22-mile (35 km) canal meanders through a gentle rural landscape and is free of locks.

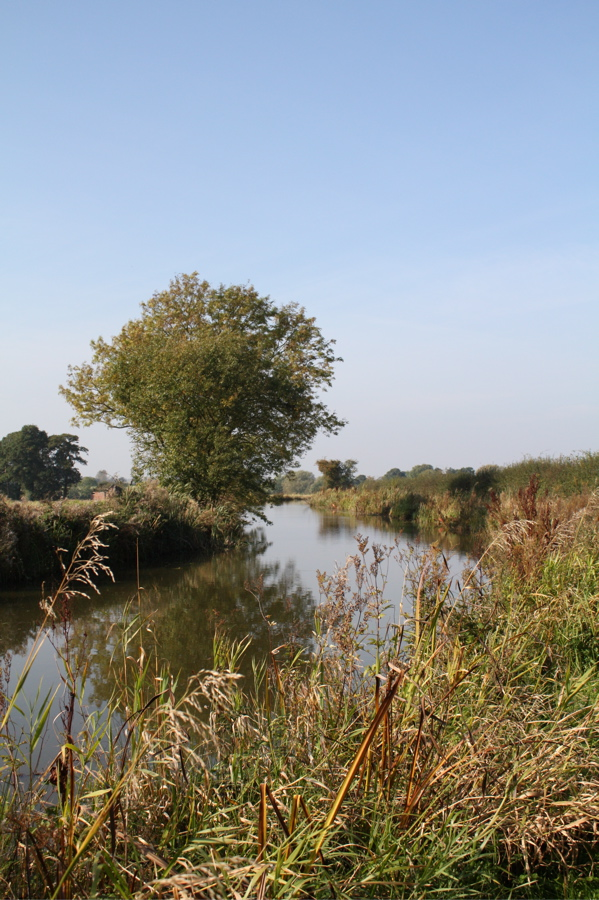
Section of Ashby Canal near Snarestone

The canal is popular with leisure boaters, anglers and wildlife enthusiasts. Hedgerows and reeds offer an ideal habitat for many species of plant and animal including herons, kingfishers, moorhens as well as numerous coarse fish including bream, roach, chub and pike. A stretch of the canal between Snarestone and Carlton has been designated a Site of Special Scientific Interest (SSSI), mainly because of the aquatic plant life and varieties of dragonfly attracted to the area.

In 2005, the Government approved plans to restore a 2.5-mile (4.0 km) stretch of the canal to provide Snarestone with a green route into the heart of the National Forest. The proposals also included a canalside wharf for the new terminus at Measham.

== Events and Attractions ==
In the Spring and Autumn the residents of Snarestone often race rubber ducks on a nearby stream to raise funds for village improvements. Most years the villagers also organise a summer fete with street parades and various entertainments (the last one took place in 2007).

Other nearby attractions include Twycross Zoo, Ashby de la Zouch Castle, Conkers Visitor Centre, Snibston Discovery Park, Bosworth Battlefield, Ashby Woulds Heritage Trail, the National Forest and a railway preservation society (The Battlefield Line) that has its own rolling stock, museum and track.

Every February during half-term locals of the village perform an amateur pantomime at the primary school. The money raised goes towards charity. For 2010 the money was donated to the Haiti Appeal.

== Brief history ==
The village appears in the Domesday Book as Snarchetone and was the farmstead of a man called Snar(o)c.

At the time of Domesday Snarestone amounted to a single carucate of waste land. This small area of land was held in 1086 by Robert the Dispensator (or Robert the Bursar). Robert was steward to William the Conqueror and the land was granted by Robert's successor (Henry de Hastynges) to an Adam Stake.

At some time during the thirteenth century the land passed to the Charnell family who held it for the following five centuries. The estate was partitioned in 1796, and half came to Charles Powell Leslie II via his wife Anne (née Ryder). The other half came to Colonel Samuel Madden via his marriage to Katherine (née Ryder). Snarestone was sold some time after Madden's death in 1814 (probably in the 1830s after the death of his father-in-law, the Rev. Charles Dudley Ryder). Snarestone passed in 1846 to Lady Anna Maria Leslie.

Snarestone's chief crops were wheat and barley. Bricks were made in the village during the nineteenth century and a coal mine was sunk in 1875 but found only water. The Ashby Canal opened in 1804 and still runs underneath a section of Main Street (formerly Long Street) via a 400-yard (366 m) tunnel.

By 1846 Snarestone had a population of 404 people. The Census of 1891 recorded 302 people and by 1901 this figured had dropped to only 265 people.

The village church is dedicated to St. Bartholomew and has a register dating back to 1559. The church was rebuilt in 1752 and enlarged in 1834 to a capacity of 150 sittings.

In 1766 there were four alehouses in Snarestone. Records from 1772 reveal that George Gadsby was the landlord of a Crown Inn but the names of the other alehouses is not known. By 1785 the village had two pubs and by 1795 the Crown Inn was the only survivor of these early establishments. The Gadsby family had a long association with the Crown Inn that lasted until 1820. The pub still exists today as the Odd House.George Gadsby (pub landlord) was the only son of George Gadsby (died 1748) who inherited the family farm and later diversified into becoming a pub landlord. Originally the Gadsby family were yeomen who had lived in Snarestone for generations. George (pub landlord) had six sisters, one of whom was Hannah Foster who married local farmer Frances Foster of Appleby Magna, both of whom are buried in the graveyard with an existing headstone.

Richard Roberts is also recorded as the landlord of the Square and Compass between 1855 and 1861 but its history is obscure. The Globe Inn first appears in the trade directories from 1870 onwards and still operates under the same name.

=== Railway Past ===
Between 1873 and 1967 Snarestone was a stop on the Ashby to Nuneaton railway line. The station building no longer exists although evidence of platforms can still be found. The goods shed and station master's house remain but have been converted into private households.

Information on the regions railway heritage can be found in The Battlefield Line Museum in neighbouring Shackerstone. The museum contains photographs of Snarestone station prior to its closure in the 1960s. Although the Heritage Battlefield Line hopes to one day (though eventually) extend their services towards Snarestone within the near future, (Even though a new site maybe required as part of this plan).

The neighbouring village of Newton Burgoland also claims to have the oldest public house in Leicestershire (The Belper Arms) which was built circa 1290.

== Nearby towns ==
- Ashby de la Zouch
- Burton Upon Trent
- Atherstone
- Coalville
- Hinckley
- Market Bosworth
- Nuneaton
- Tamworth

== Surrounding villages ==
- Appleby Magna
- Barton in the Beans
- Bilstone
- Carlton
- Congerstone
- Ibstock
- Measham
- Odstone
- Norton-Juxta-Twycross
- Newton Burgoland
- Shackerstone
- Sheepy Magna
- Swepstone
- Twycross

== See also ==
- Battle of Bosworth Field

== Notes ==
1. This population estimate is based on figures from the 2001 Census provided by the Office for National Statistics Neighbourhood Statistics website and uses the Snarestone CP (Parish) area which excludes surrounding villages.
2. BBC News Story
3. A Dictionary of British Place-Names. A. D. Mills. Oxford University Press, 2003. Oxford Reference Online. Oxford University Press.
4. Domesday Book
5. The History and Antiquities of Leicester, John Nichols Vol. lV Pt. ll
6. Leicestershire Trade Directories
7. White’s History, Gazetteer and Directory of Leicestershire, William White
8. Leicestershire Census Data, Leicestershire County Records Office
9. Trade Directories, Kelly, Leicestershire Libraries and Information Service
10. Trade Directories, Alehouse Recognizance Books
11. Belper Arms Website
