= Normanton le Heath =

Village in Leicestershire, England

Coordinates: 52.712°N 1.442°W

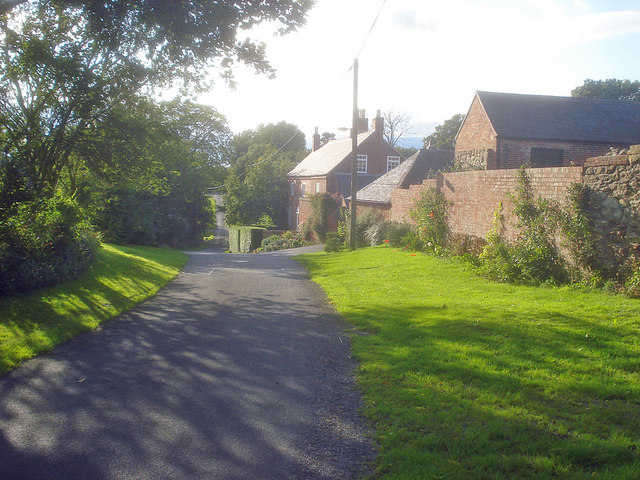
- The Hollow, Nomanton le Heath

- Location within Leicestershire
- Population: 165 (2011 Census)
- OS grid reference: SK377128
- District: North West Leicestershire
- Shire county: Leicestershire
- Region: East Midlands
- Country: England
- Sovereign state: United Kingdom
- Post town: COALVILLE
- Postcode district: LE67
- Dialling code: 01530
- Police: Leicestershire
- Fire: Leicestershire
- Ambulance: East Midlands
- UK Parliament: North West Leicestershire

Normanton le Heath is a village and civil parish situated between the parishes of Packington, Ravenstone and Heather in North West Leicestershire, England. The population of the civil parish was 131 at the 2001 census, rising to 165 at the 2011 census. It should not be confused with another Normanton in the county which is near Bottesford.

The name, which in Old English means the settlement of Northmen on the heath, suggests that the current village was probably an English village taken over by a group of Norse or Danish settlers at the time of the original Viking settlement, and this fits well into the overall pattern of land occupation in the area. It lies on the edge of the great heath that once stretched Westwards from the edge of Charnwood Forest, something which is reflected in the names of a number of other settlements in the area, such as Heather and Donington le Heath.

There are, however, signs of significant earlier land usage in the parish. Near to the boundary with Heather and Ravenstone an Iron Age settlement has been discovered. Equally, the newly discovered Roman road from Leicester to Chester has been discovered running through the centre of Normanton. Just over the parish boundary in the southern Ravenstone area there was a small Roman town.

A track called the Swepstone Way can be traced running from the Iron Age settlement all the way to Tamworth. The Salt Way which ran through Measham can also be traced to Normanton. It is not totally implausible to suggest that a road/track ran through the centre from Ancaster to Wall. If this is correct it would suggest that this track was of Roman origin. However, this is very much a speculative road at the moment.

The settlement is not mentioned in the Domesday Book and the first mention we have is in 1209. Much of the land in the early Middle Ages to the north was known to be woodland or heathland. Coal mining formed part of the economy of the area from a very early period and mines have been found at the abandoned village of Alton to the north of Normanton.

To the east of the village was the Long Moor open cast coal mine managed by UK Coal. Over a three-year period from 2007 to 2010 this extracted 725,000 tons of coal. Following restoration, the 188 acres (76 ha) mine site has been acquired by the Woodland Trust. With adjoining agricultural land this will become the Flagship Diamond Wood, a 186 hectares (460 acres) new woodland to celebrate the 2012 Diamond Jubilee of Queen Elizabeth II.
