= Caroline Sophia Lunn =

British novelist and hymnwriter

Caroline Sophia Grundy Lunn (1823 – 1893) was an English novelist and hymnwriter. She sometimes published under the pseudonym Linus.

== Biography ==
Caroline Sophia Grundy was born on 1823 in Fenny Drayton, Leicestershire, England, the daughter of farmer John Grundy.

Grundy married John Calbraith Lunn, an Irish-born Unitarian minister and amateur astronomer who was elected a fellow of the Royal Astronomical Society, on 10 December 1851. The couple had no children.

In 1860, she published a collection of poems under the pseudonym Linus. She went on to publish four novels in the 1870s and 1880s. She contributed ten hymns to her husband's book Hymns for Religious Services (1880), including "Day and night the blessings fall".

Lunn's husband died in 1891. She died in 1893 and was buried in Leamington Spa, Warwickshire, England.

== Bibliography ==
- Poems. 1860.
- Only Eve. 3 vol. London: Sampson Low, 1873.
- The Masters of Claythorpe. 3 vol. London: Sampson Low, 1874.
- Clare Stellar: A Novel. 2 vol. London: Remington, 1883.
- Shamrock and Rose: A Novel. 3 vol. London: T. Fisher Unwin, 1888.
