= Ravenstone, Leicestershire =

Village in Leicestershire, England

Coordinates: 52.720°N 1.406°W

Ravenstone
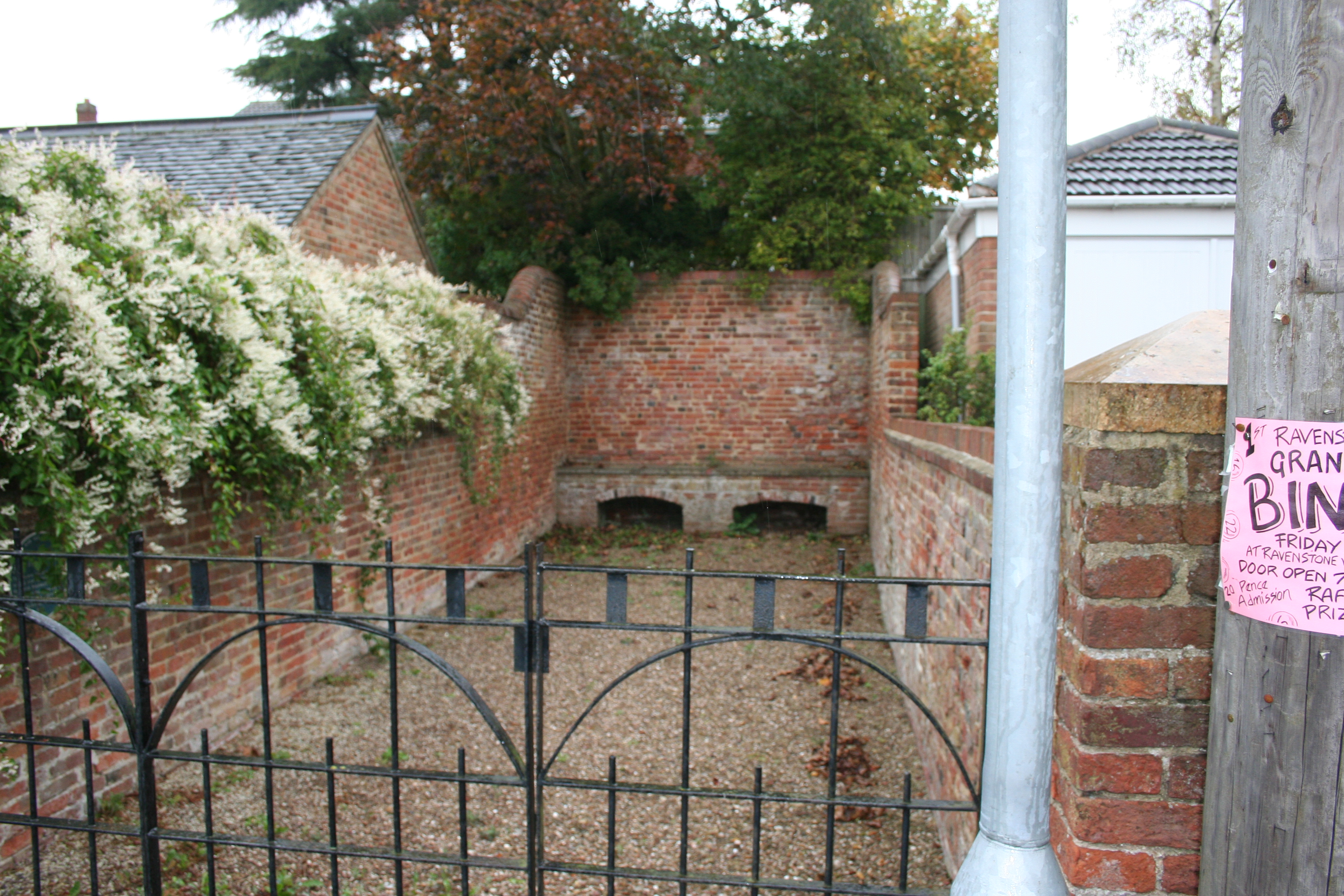
- Pinfold in Ravenstone

- Location within Leicestershire
- Population: 2,149 (2001)
- OS grid reference: SK402137
- Civil parish: Ravenstone with Snibstone
- District: North West Leicestershire
- Shire county: Leicestershire
- Region: East Midlands
- Country: England
- Sovereign state: United Kingdom
- Post town: COALVILLE
- Postcode district: LE67
- Dialling code: 01530
- Police: Leicestershire
- Fire: Leicestershire
- Ambulance: East Midlands
- UK Parliament: North West Leicestershire

Ravenstone is a village and former civil parish, now in the parish of Ravenstone with Snibstone, in the North West Leicestershire district, in the county of Leicestershire, England. It is within the National Forest, just off the A511 road between Coalville and Ashby-de-la-Zouch, in 2001 it had a population of 2,149.

== Historic settlement ==
Archeological excavations carried out in 1981 to the south of the present village revealed the site of a Romano-British settlement. Evidence for iron smelting was found, along with kilns and coins dating from the late 3rd century. There is also evidence of a Roman road crossing the southern part of the parish and through the settlement. The settlement site was destroyed when around eight million tonnes of coal were extracted by opencast mining between 1982 and 1996. The area has since been returned to open fields and is now known as the Sence Valley Forest Park.

The first documentary evidence of the existence of the village is in the Domesday Book when Donisthorpe, a manor in Derbyshire, was owned by Nigel of Stafford and it was valued at twelve pence. Its name, which is derived from the Old Norse Hrœfnes, the name of a Saxon invader, and the suffix tūn, meaning "Hrafn's farm or village", suggests that the settlement was probably initiated by the Anglo Saxons.

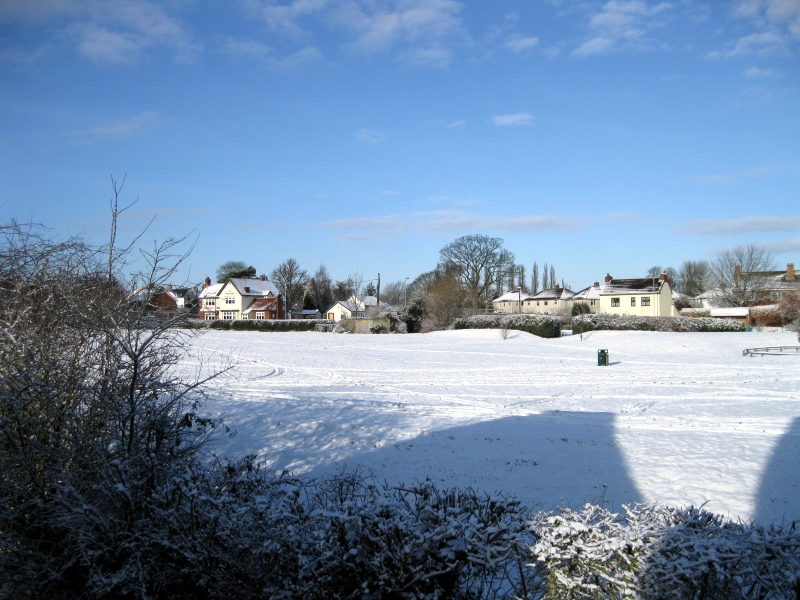
Ravenstone, December 2009.

A castle, most probably consisting of an earth mound and ditch surrounded by a wooden palisade, is documented in a treaty concluded between 1147 and 1153 by the Earls of Chester and Leicester, in which it was agreed for it to be destroyed since it threatened their respective estates. The exact site of the castle has so far never been established, but it may have stood on the north side of the village on or near the site of Ravenstone Hall.

The parish church of St Michael and All Angels is situated on the northern fringe of the village and dates from 1323. The church is of sandstone believed to have been quarried at nearby Alton, one of the two abandoned villages in the parish. Alton means "old farm", suggesting that it had been established before Ravenstone.

In 1881 the parish had a population of 451. On 24 March 1884 the parish was abolished and to form "Ravenstone with Snibstone".

The centre of the village was designated a Conservation Area in 1973.

The neighbouring parish of Snibston is home to St. Mary's church, one of the smallest churches in Britain, which holds only about 30 people.

== New woodland ==
To the west of the village was the Long Moor open cast coal mine managed by UK Coal. Over a three-year period from 2007 to 2010 they extracted 725,000 tons of coal. Following restoration, the 188 acres (76 ha) mine site has been acquired by the Woodland Trust. With adjoining agricultural land this will become the Flagship Diamond Wood, a 186 hectares (460 acres) new woodland to celebrate the 2012 Diamond Jubilee of Queen Elizabeth II.

== Notable people ==
- Francis Inge (1840–1923), cricketer and clergyman
- Ann Ayre Hely (1819-1902), Crimean War nurse 1855-1856. Awarded the Order of the Royal Red Cross 1897. Resided at Ravenstone Hospital 1889-1902

== See also ==
- River Sence, a tributary of which arises in Ravenstone.
