= Little Orton =

Little Orton may refer to:

- Little Orton, Cumbria
- Little Orton, Leicestershire
