= South Knighton =

South Knighton may refer to the following places in England:

- South Knighton, Ilsington, Devon
- South Knighton, a place in Leicestershire
