= Gopsall =

Former civil parish in Leicestershire, England

Coordinates: 52.658997°N 1.494484°W

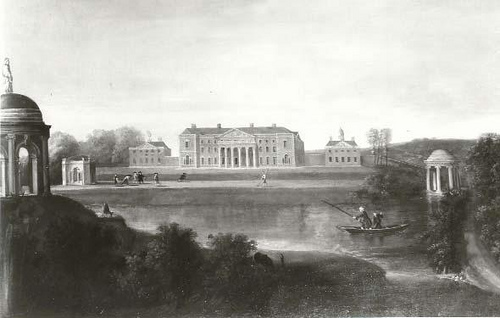
- Engraving of Gopsall Hall

- Location within Leicestershire
- OS grid reference: SK 34594 06819
  - London: 170 km
- Civil parish: Twycross
- District: Hinckley and Bosworth
- Shire county: Leicestershire
- Region: East Midlands
- Country: England
- Sovereign state: United Kingdom
- Post town: ATHERSTONE
- Postcode district: CV9
- Dialling code: 01530
- Police: Leicestershire
- Fire: Leicestershire
- Ambulance: East Midlands

Gopsall is a former civil parish, now in the parish of Twycross, in the Hinckley and Bosworth district, in the county of Leicestershire, England. It is located between the villages of Appleby Magna, Shackerstone, Twycross and Snarestone. In 1931 the parish had a population of 13. Gopsall was formerly an extra-parochial tract, from 1858 Gopsall was a civil parish in its own right, on 1 April 1935 the parish was abolished and merged with Twycross.

The name 'Gopsall' means 'hill of the servants'.

Gopsall is the site of a former Georgian country house that was known as Gopsall Hall. The northern edge of the estate is dissected by the Ashby-de-la-Zouch Canal and a long distance trail known as the Ivanhoe Way.

The area is mostly agricultural and is dotted with privately owned farms. A combination of public and permissive footpaths allows limited access to the public between Little Twycross and Shackerstone. A permissive footpath also allows access to Gopsall Temple ruins within Racecourse wood. The A444 Ashby to Nuneaton road also leads to a canal wharf on the western edge of the estate.

== Gopsall Hall ==
Gopsall Hall was erected for Charles Jennens around 1750 at a cost of £100,000 (£8,516,000 today). It was long believed to have been designed by John Westley and built by the Hiorns of Warwick, who later added service wings and Rococo interiors. However, later research by John Harris, curator of the RIBA drawings collection suggests that it was designed as well as built by William or David Hiorns.

The Hall was set in several hundred acres of land and included two lakes, a walled garden, a Chinese boathouse, a Gothic seat and various garden buildings. In 1818 a grand entrance (modelled on the Arch of Constantine) was added.

Queen Adelaide was a frequent visitor to the Hall during her long widowhood. She was popular with the locals, being remembered in many of the surrounding villages. (E.g. The former Queen Adelaide Pub in Appleby Magna, Queen Street, Measham and the Queen Adelaide Oak Tree in Bradgate Park)

In 1848 Gopsall Hall was described as follows:

Gopsall Hall, an extra-parochial liberty, in the union of Market Bosworth, hundred of Sparkenhoe, S. division of the county of Leicester, 4¼ miles (a little under 7km N. W. by W.) from Market Bosworth. This place comprises 724 acres (2.93 km^{2}), nearly all park; and is the property of Earl Howe, whose large and elegant mansion, on a gentle eminence nearly in the centre of the Park, was built by Charles Jennens, Esq., about the year 1750, at a cost of more than £100,000. The principal front looks towards the south, and on each side is a wing projecting 27 feet (8.2 m), the whole length being 180 feet (55 m); the grounds are adorned with temples, are finely wooded, and well stocked with deer. The Ashby-de-la-Zouch canal passes close to the north-east side of the Park, and on its western side is the Ashby and Atherstone road. Here was a cell to the abbey of Merevale, in the county of Warwick.

Said to be the finest country house in Leicestershire, its last use was as an army headquarters during World War II, and was in such bad repair that it was demolished in 1951. Gopsall Park Farm was built over most of the original site and is not accessible without invitation.

The remains include parts of the walled garden, the electricity generating building, an underground reservoir, the tree-lined avenue, the gatehouse and the temple ruins associated with Handel.

During the 1920s and 1930s Gopsall hosted motor racing speed trials and there were plans for an international racing circuit and airfield to be built.

Notable guests who stayed at the estate included Queen Adelaide, King Edward VII, Queen Alexandra, and Winston Churchill.

Land around Gopsall was considered as a possible site for East Midlands Airport.

Between 1873 and the 1930s Gopsall was served via the Ashby to Nuneaton railway line. The station at Shackerstone is part of a preserved railway and visitor attraction (Battlefield Line Railway). During December 1902 King Edward VII, Queen Alexandra along with other dignitaries arrived at the station in the new LNWR Royal Train on their way to Gopsall Hall. The arrival did not go to plan, with the King's exit door failing to open and the party having to alight from elsewhere on the carriages.

There was a Great Western Railway steam locomotive by the name of "Gopsal Hall". Note the misspelling of the name.

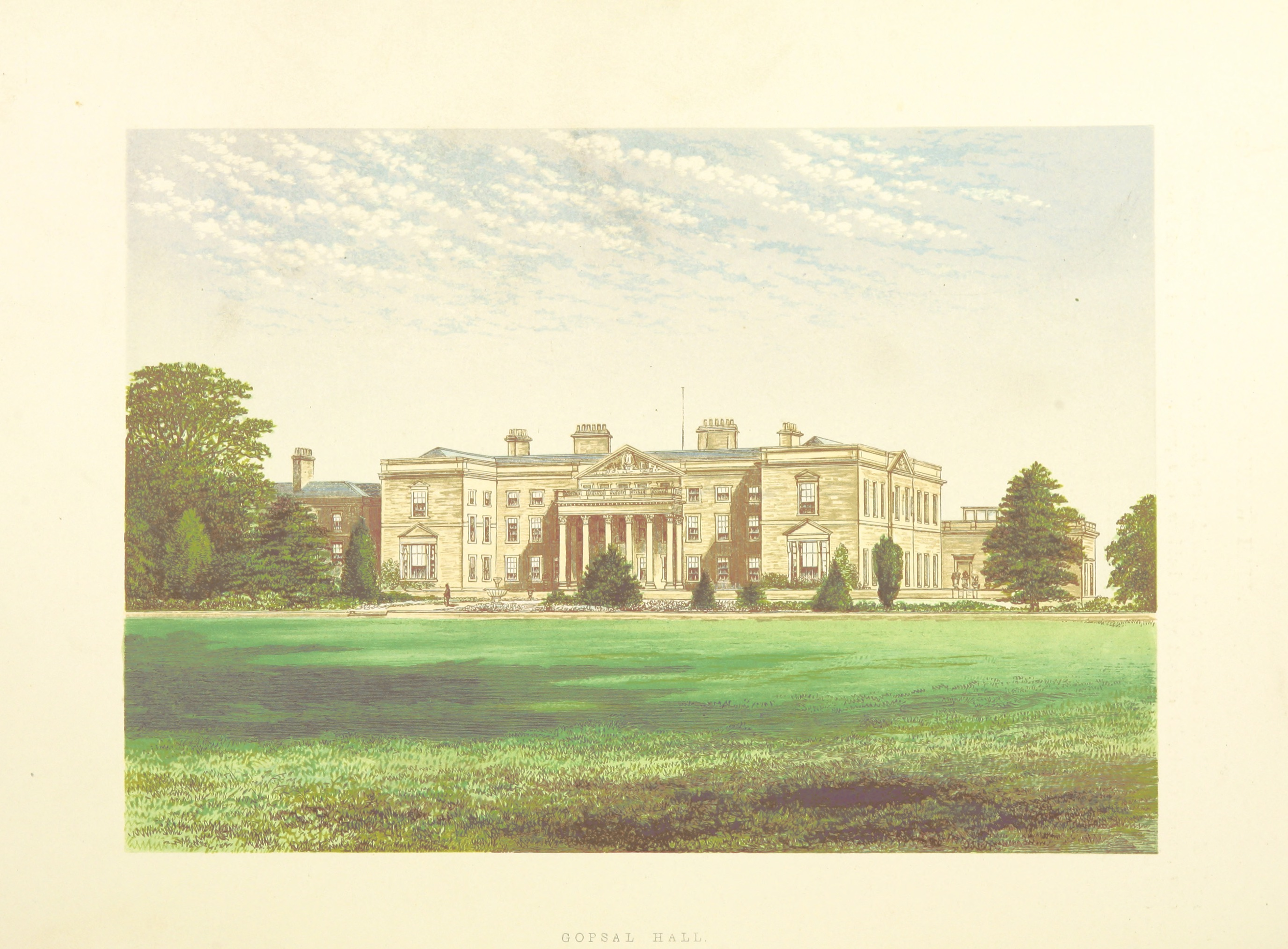
1868 view

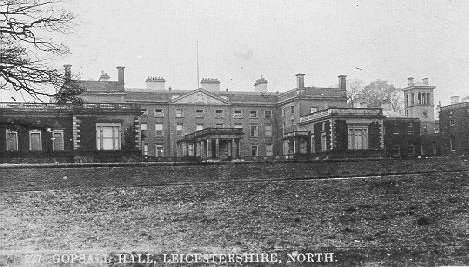
North Front of Gopsall Hall

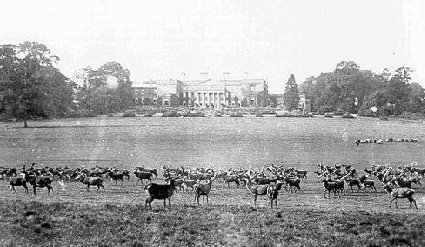
Deer in Gopsall Park

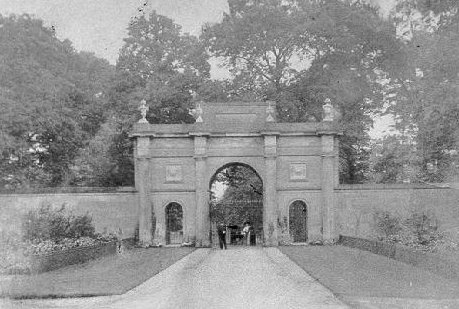
The Gate House at Gopsall Park

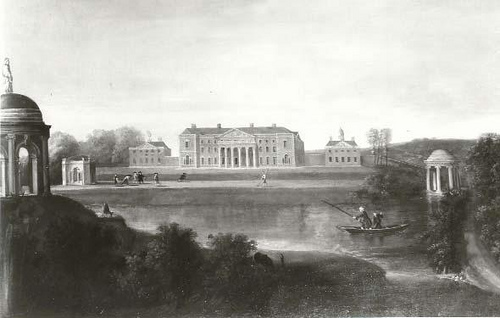

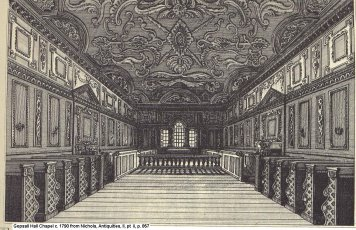
Chapel at Gopsall Hall

Remains of Gopsall Temple

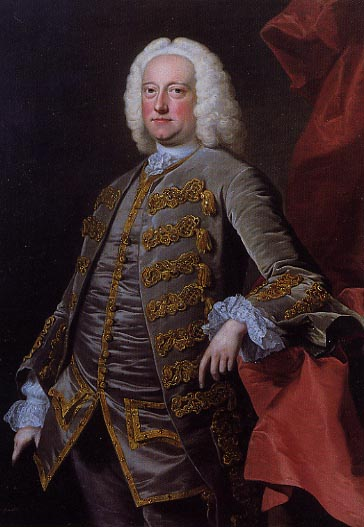
Charles Jennens

=== Chronology of owner ===
- circa 1068: Hugh d'Avaranches
- 1071 - 1148: Henry de Ferrers (Ferrieres) and heirs
- 1148 - c.1350: Roger de Grendon and heirs
- c.1350 - 1564: The Langham family
- 1564 - 1604: Sir George Hastings
- 1604 - 1618: Henry Hastings
- 1618 - 1677: Sir Thomas Merry (Merrye)
- 1677 - 1685: Sir John Lowther of Lowther Hall
- 1685 - 1690: Humphrey Jennens
- 1690 - 1747: Charles Jennens senior
- 1747 - 1773: Charles Jennens, grandson of Humphrey Jennens
- 1773 - 1797: Penn Assheton Curzon, grandnephew of Charles Jennens and son of Assheton Curzon, 1st Viscount Curzon.
- 1797 - 1870: Richard Curzon-Howe (Earl Howe), son of Penn Assheton Curzon and Sophia Howe (Baroness Howe)
- 1870 - 1919: the Curzon-Howe family
- 1919 – 1932: Sir Samuel James Waring (Lord Waring) (Gopsall Estate, Park & Hall)
- 1932 – 1951: Crown Estate (Most of the Gopsall Estate excluding Gopsall Park & Hall) (NOTE: the Hall, demolished in 1952 was never owned by the Crown Estate. After Lord & Lady Waring died (1940 & 1941), Panton Investments owned the Park and Hall until they went bankrupt in 1951)
- 1951-2017: Crown Estate. (All the Estate including Gopsall Park and the land originally occupied by the Hall)
- 2017: Estate sold to some sitting tenant farmers and the rest, called "Shackerstone Estate" was sold to Chris Stamper (of Rare Computing, Twycross)

== Gopsall Temple ==
Gopsall temple, based upon an original design by James Paine, was built by William and David Hiorn. The temple structure was probably completed c.1759.

In 2002 the temple was part of a restoration project and it is also a Grade II listed building.

It is possible to visit the monument via the public footpath near the old Gopsall Hall Gatehouse entrance in the village of Shackerstone. It is a good 15 minute walk to the site.

A statue of Religion by Louis Francois Roubiliac (c.1760) stood on the roof of the temple. A cenotaph (Richard Haywood, 1764) was placed in the temple as a memorial to the classical scholar (and Jennens's friend) Edward Holdsworth. In 1857, the statue of Religion was donated by Lord Howe to the City of Leicester and is housed in the gardens of Belgrave Hall Museum. Holdsworth's cenotaph was purchased by Leicester Museums in 1951 and is also in the gardens of Belgrave Hall.

== Handel’s Messiah ==
During the second half of the eighteenth century the estate was owned by Charles Jennens (a librettist and friend of George Frideric Handel). It is often, incorrectly stated that in 1741 Handel composed part of Messiah, his famous oratorio, inside a garden temple at Gopsall. Although it is known that Handel visited Gopsall, he could not have written Messiah (1741) while sitting in the temple. Gopsall Hall was still not completed in 1750 and the building of the temple had not been started. Indeed, Charles Jennens didn't inherit the estate until 1747, on the death of his father Charles Jennens senior (1662–1747).

The organ that Handel specified for Charles Jennens in 1749 is now to be found in St James' Church, Great Packington.
