= River Anker =

River in England

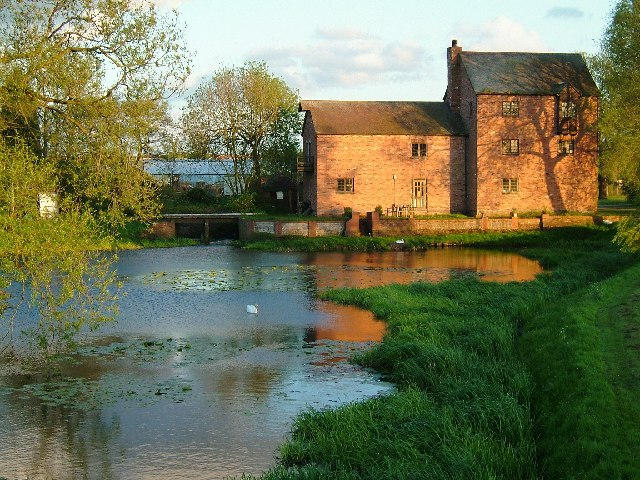
- Alders Mill on the River Anker near Pinwall

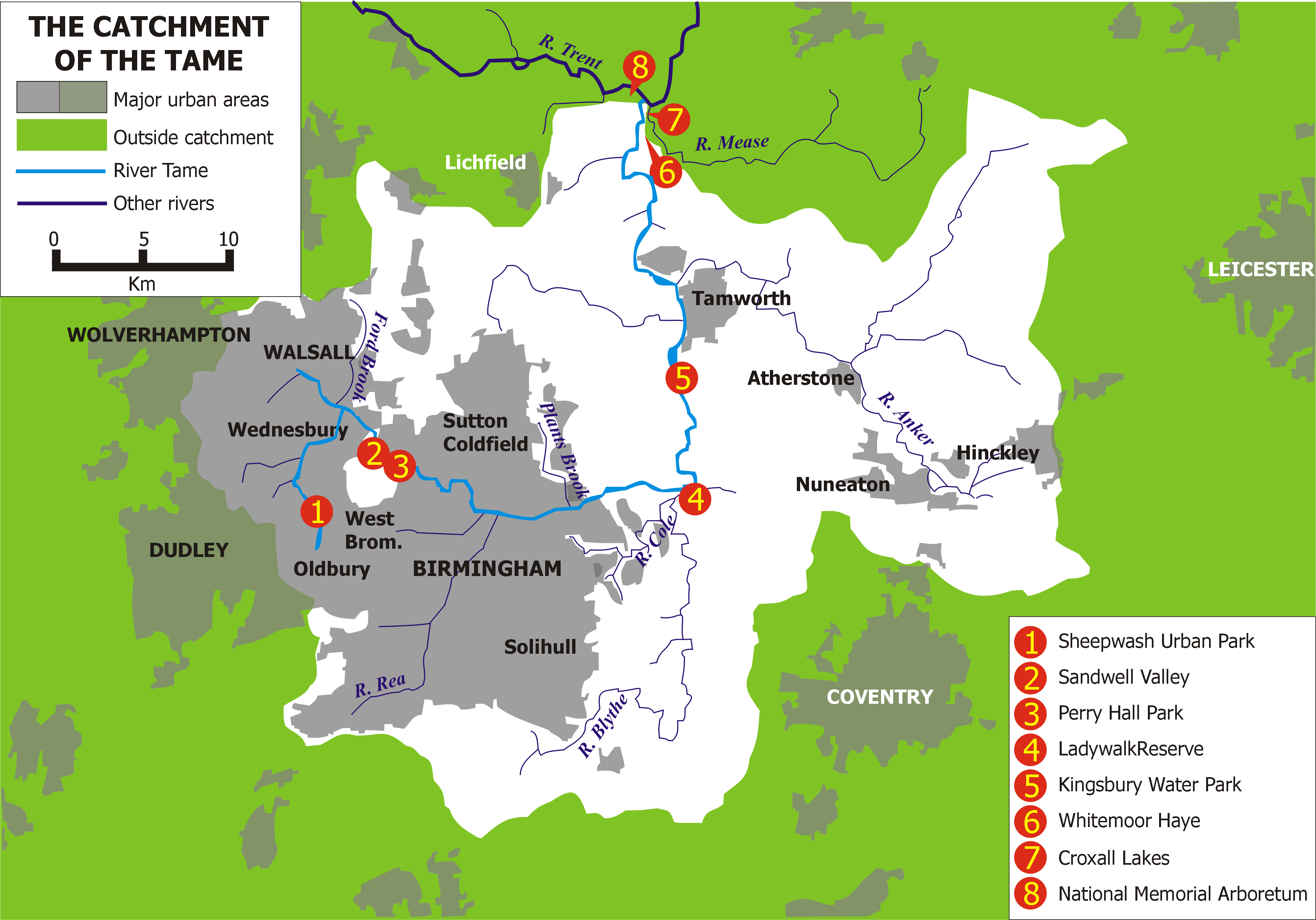
- Course and catchment of the River Anker, shown on the eastern side of the Tame catchment

Location
- Country: England
- Counties: Leicestershire, Warwickshire, Staffordshire
- Towns: Nuneaton, Tamworth

Physical characteristics
- Source
  - location: Wolvey, Warwickshire
  - coordinates: 52.47590°N 1.34728°W
- Mouth: River Tame
  - location: Tamworth, Staffordshire
  - coordinates: 52.6315°N 1.6977°W
- Length: 50 km (31 mi)
- Discharge
  - location: Polesworth
  - average: 3.2 m^{3}/s (110 cu ft/s)

Basin features
- Tributaries
  - left: Penmire Brook, Innage Brook, River Sence, Griff Brook
  - right: Wem Brook, Sketchley Brook

The River Anker flows through Nuneaton, England. It is a major tributary of the River Tame, which it joins in Tamworth. The name derives from the old British for winding river. From source to river mouth at Tamworth is 50 kilometres (31 mi).

== Course ==
The river rises near Wolvey and flows in a north-westerly direction to pass between Bramcote and Burton Hastings, it is designated a main river at Stretton Baskerville where it also forms the boundary between the boroughs of Rugby, Nuneaton and Bedworth. On the outskirts of Nuneaton it collects the Wem Brook, and then passes alongside the Liberty Way sports stadium. At this point the river splits, with a flood relief channel to the north, and the main channel passing through the Nuneaton town centre. The relief channel re-joins beyond the town at Weddington, where the river then continues in the same north-westerly direction to pass the village of Caldecote, then Mancetter (where it is crossed by Watling Street) and Witherley, before reaching Atherstone where it is joined by the River Sence.

Downstream of the confluence, it reaches Grendon and then flows through Polesworth before passing beneath the M42 motorway. Beyond the motorway it passes through Alvecote Pools and meadows, a 128 ha (320 acres) Site of Special Scientific Interest (SSSI) and nature reserve. It continues past Amington Hall before turning south-westerly to flow through Tamworth and join the River Tame near Tamworth Castle.

The Anker is popular with anglers and is known to contain some large pike and chub. Also there are barbel present with fish over 15 lb being reported.

== Hydrology ==
The flow of the Anker has been measured at a gauging station in its lower reaches at Polesworth since 1966. The catchment to the station of 386 square kilometres (149 sq mi) yields an average flow of 3.2 cubic metres per second (110 cu ft/s). The highest river level recorded at the station occurred on the 25 November 2012, with a height of 2.57 metres (8 ft 5 in) and a flow of 128 cubic metres per second (4,500 cu ft/s).

The catchment upstream of the station has an average annual rainfall of 653 millimetres (25.7 in) and a maximum altitude of 275 metres (902 ft) near Bardon Hill in Charnwood Forest at the north-eastern edge of the basin.

== Flooding ==
The River Anker has flooded Nuneaton town centre several times in the past, including 1968, prompting the construction of a 600-metre-long (2,000 ft) flood relief channel in Weddington in 1976.

In July 2007 the river flooded the Liberty Way pitch, forcing Nuneaton Town and Nuneaton RFC to cancel matches while the river water drained away.

== See also ==
- List of rivers of England
