= Congerstone =

Village in Leicestershire, England

Coordinates: 52.64°N 01.46°W

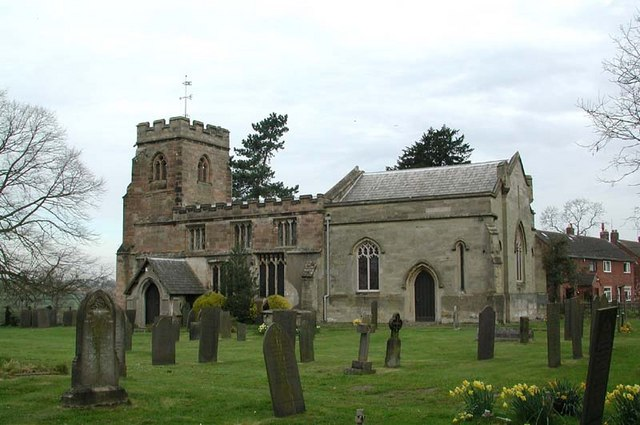
- St Mary's Parish Church

- Location within Leicestershire
- OS grid reference: SK3605
- Civil parish: Shackerstone
- District: Hinckley and Bosworth
- Shire county: Leicestershire
- Region: East Midlands
- Country: England
- Sovereign state: United Kingdom
- Post town: Nuneaton
- Postcode district: CV13
- Police: Leicestershire
- Fire: Leicestershire
- Ambulance: East Midlands
- UK Parliament: Hinckley and Bosworth

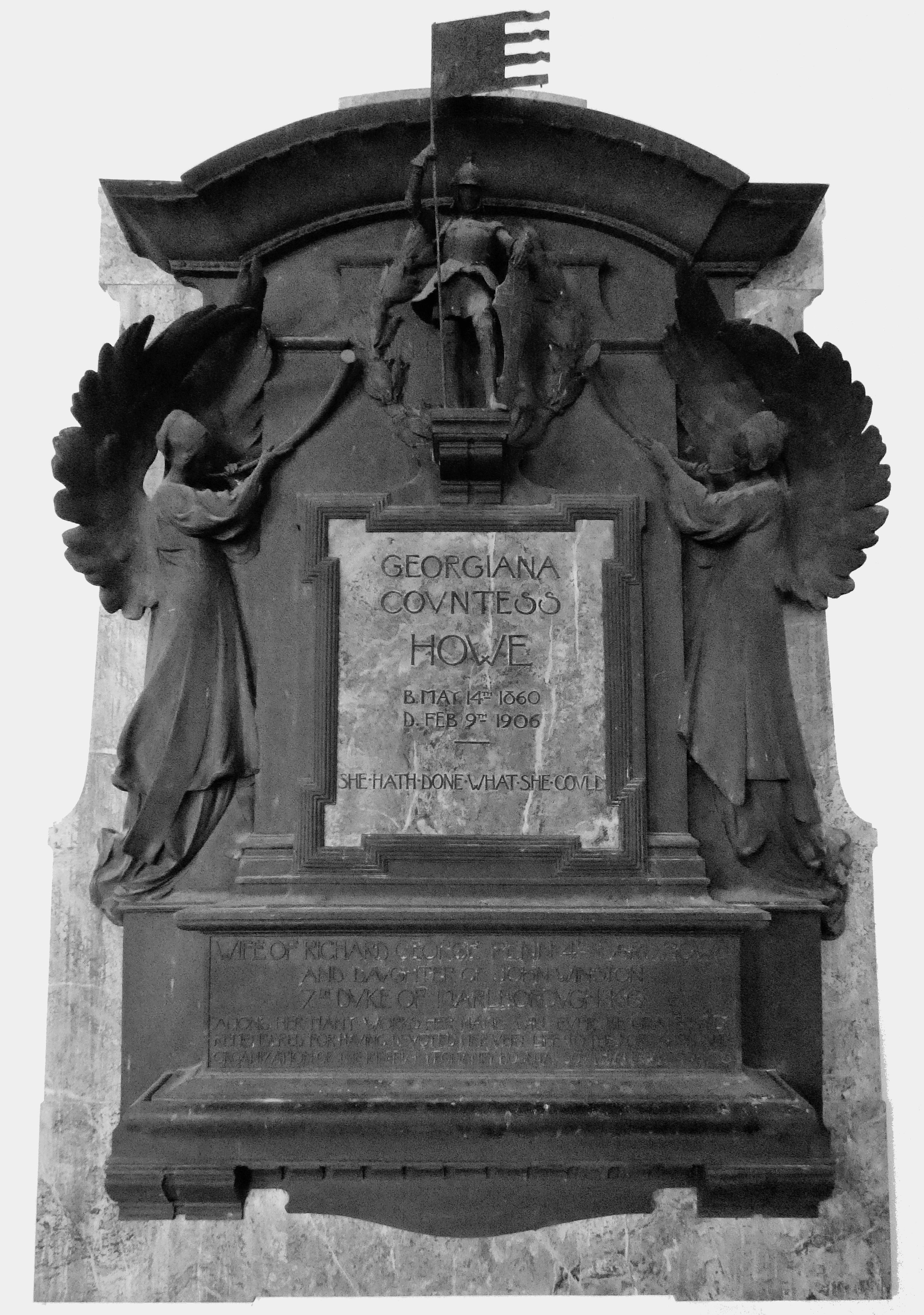
Monument in memory of Georgiana Countess Howe by Sir George Frampton

Congerstone (/ˈkʌndʒəstən/) is a village and former civil parish, now in the parish of Shackerstone, in the Hinckley and Bosworth district, in Leicestershire, England. It is three miles north west of Market Bosworth, of which it was historically a daughter parish. It is near the Ashby-de-la-Zouch Canal and the A444 road. In 1931 the parish had a population of 209.

The Grade II* listed parish church of St Mary the Virgin dates back to 1179, although the current building is largely from the 16th century and was remodelled in the 19th century. The patron of the church was formerly the Curzon family of Earl Howe who also helped fund the village school. The church includes a monument by Sir George Frampton, dedicated to Georgiana, Countess Howe, first wife of Richard Curzon, 4th Earl Howe.

The village has one school, Congerstone Primary School, on Shackerstone Road.

== History ==
The village's name derives from the Old English cyning-tūn meaning 'farm/settlement of a king'.

On 1 April 1935 the parish was abolished and merged with Shackerstone.
