= Atterton =

Hamlet in Leicestershire, England

Coordinates: 52.581°N 01.482°W

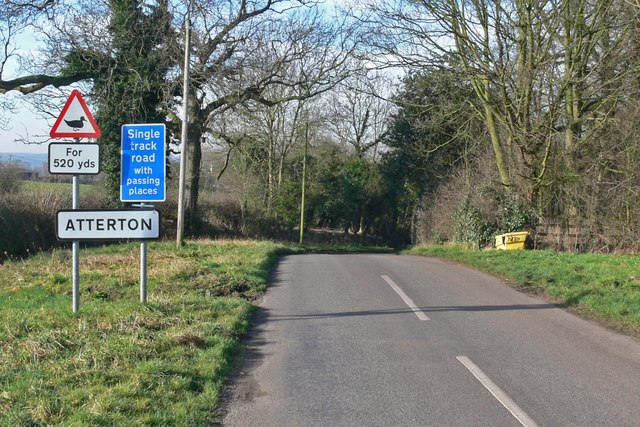
- Sign on entering the hamlet suggests local ducks know their limits precisely - February 2008: Look west Atterton Road

- Location within Leicestershire
- Population: c.40
- OS grid reference: SP3598
- Civil parish: Witherley
- District: Hinckley and Bosworth
- Shire county: Leicestershire
- Region: East Midlands
- Country: England
- Sovereign state: United Kingdom
- Post town: ATHERSTONE
- Postcode district: CV9
- Police: Leicestershire
- Fire: Leicestershire
- Ambulance: East Midlands

Atterton is a hamlet in the civil parish of Witherley, in the Hinckley and Bosworth district, in the county of Leicestershire, England. It has a population of approximately 40 people.

== History ==
The hamlet's name means 'farm/settlement of Athelred or Eadred'.

Atterton became a parish in 1866, on 1 April 1935 the parish was abolished and merged with Witherley. In 1931 the parish had a population of 43.
