= Ratcliffe Culey =

Village in Leicestershire, England

Coordinates: 52.593°N 1.520°W

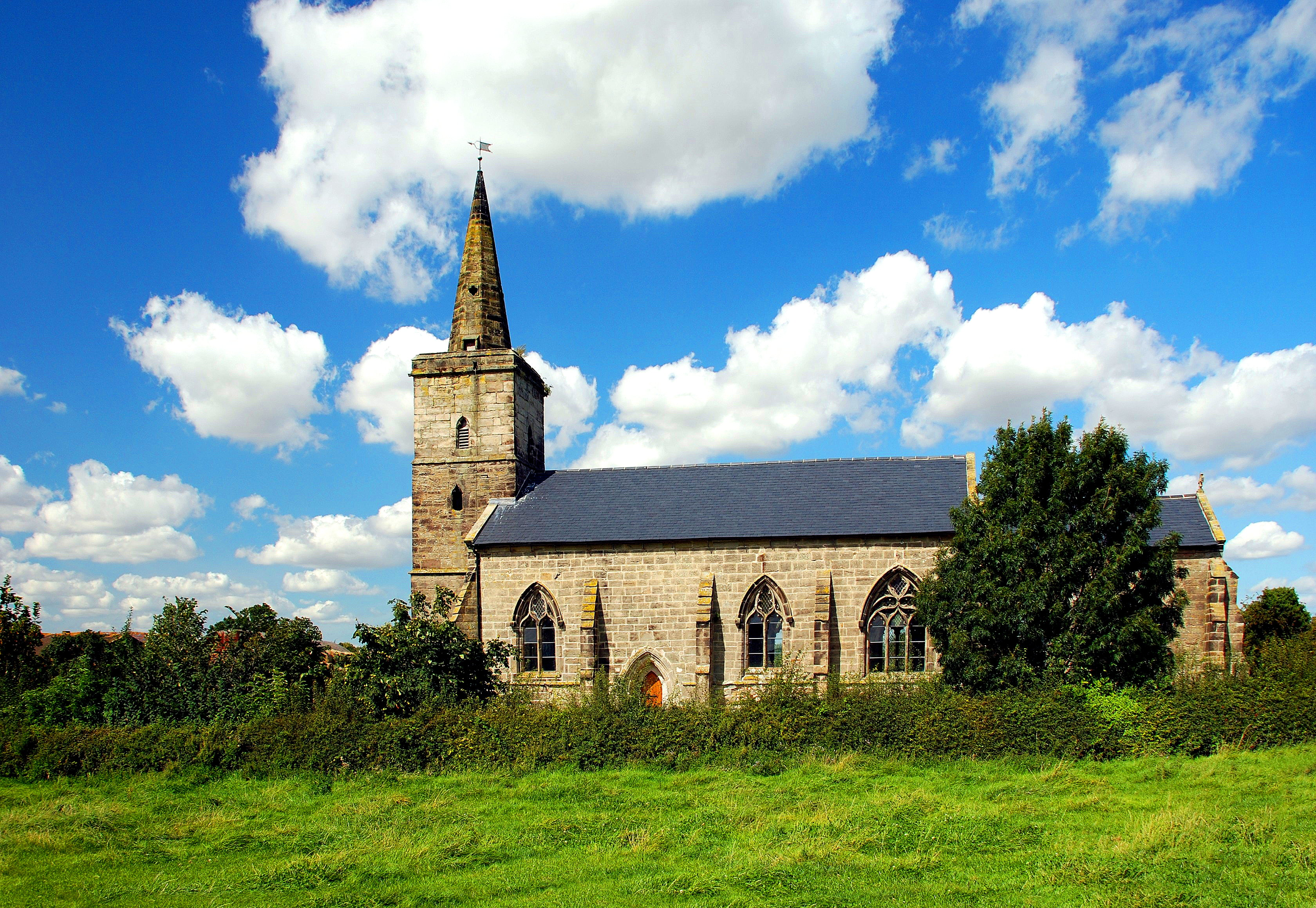
- All Saints' parish church

- Location within Leicestershire
- Civil parish: Witherley
- District: Hinckley and Bosworth
- Shire county: Leicestershire
- Region: East Midlands
- Country: England
- Sovereign state: United Kingdom
- Post town: Atherstone
- Postcode district: CV9
- Dialling code: 01827
- Police: Leicestershire
- Fire: Leicestershire
- Ambulance: East Midlands
- UK Parliament: Hinckley and Bosworth
- Website: Witherley Parish Council

Ratcliffe Culey is a village and former civil parish, now in the parish of Witherley, in the Hinckley and Bosworth district, in Leicestershire, England, near the county boundary with Warwickshire. In 1931 the parish had a population of 184.

The village has the Church of England parish church of All Saints, a pub called "The Gate", a post office and a greyhound kennels.

== History ==
The toponym "Ratcliffe" is derived from Old English, referring to the local red clay and the fact that it is on high land. Culey is the name of a former lord of the manor.

In June 1646 the town of Ratcliffe Culey submitted claims to the Warwickshire county committee for losses and free quarter from the parliamentary garrisons in Warwickshire. Colonel Purefoy, Captain Potter and Major Pout of the Coventry garrison were charged for "free quarter" worth an estimated £12 6s 8d Captain Turton is said to have taken six horses worth £6. On another occasion the parish claimed for 6 saddles worth £1 10s taken by Lieutenant Hunt of the Astley garrison and a mare worth £3 taken from Thomas Richardson.

Ratcliffe Culey was formerly a chapelry in Sheepy-Magna parish, from 1866 Ratcliffe Culey was a civil parish in its own right until it was abolished on 1 April 1935 and merged with Witherley.
