= Witherley =

Village in Leicestershire, England

Coordinates: 52.573°N 1.520°W

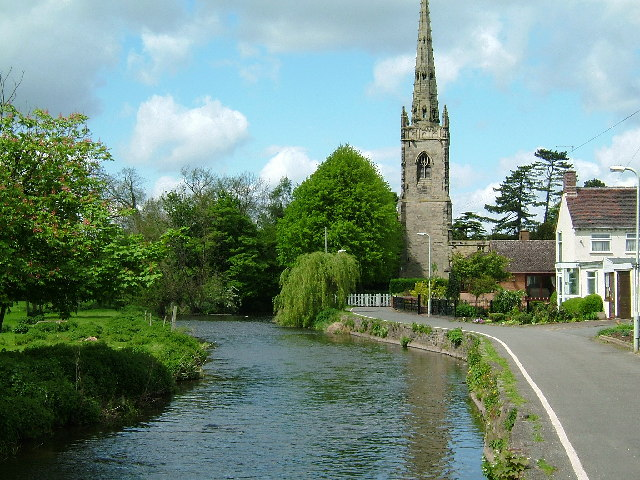
- Parish church of Saint Peter

- Location within Leicestershire
- Population: 1,373 (2011)
- Civil parish: Witherley
- District: Hinckley and Bosworth
- Shire county: Leicestershire
- Region: East Midlands
- Country: England
- Sovereign state: United Kingdom
- Post town: ATHERSTONE
- Postcode district: CV9
- Dialling code: 01827
- Police: Leicestershire
- Fire: Leicestershire
- Ambulance: East Midlands
- UK Parliament: Hinckley and Bosworth

Witherley is a village and civil parish in the Hinckley and Bosworth district of Leicestershire, England. The civil parish of Witherley includes Atterton, Fenny Drayton, and Ratcliffe Culey as well as the village of Witherley itself. The population of the civil parish at the 2011 census was 1,373.

== Location ==
Witherley is situated in the far west of Leicestershire. The Warwickshire-Leicestershire border runs parallel to the parish boundary, along the River Anker to the west and the A5 to the south. The village centre is less than 2 miles from the town of Atherstone and 1 mile from the village of Mancetter.

== Village features ==
One of its significant features is the church of St Peter, noted for its tall steeple, 52 yards (48 m)/157.4 ft high. The village school, Witherley Church of England Primary School, is located next to the church. Usually, children attending the school will transfer to Market Bosworth School at the appropriate age. Other notable attributes are the River Anker that runs alongside the border of Witherley, The Old House B&B and the Blue Lion public house located in the center of the village.

== History ==
Proximity to the county border meant that parliamentary troops from the Warwickshire garrisons made several visits to Witherley and Atterton during the Civil War. A list of claims for losses and "free quarter" to the Warwickshire county committee in June, 1646 includes a claim for free quarter for a hundred men and horse under the command of Captain Levell and Captain Astewe from Colonel Purefoy's regiment of the Coventry garrison, estimated to be worth £9. Mr Lloyd, the rector, charged Captain Ottway's lieutenant for four horses and mares worth £13.6.8, and for three heifers worth £7.10. In 1650 this same Robert Lloyd was "sequestered" and forced to pay a fine in 1650 as a ‘malignant’ or for neglecting his duties (it is not certain exactly which as few details of his offences are provided).

William King claimed that Captain Flower's men had taken a horse worth 5s and John King claimed for a saddle worth 8s taken by Captain Flower's lieutenant and asked for £2 for quartering about forty soldiers from Coventry. The Astley garrison also plundered the villages, leading to a claim for forced requisitioning including the "carriage of a load of hay from Hartshill Leaz to Astley House" worth £1, and the carriage of 14 loads of hay worth £2.6.8. Francis Orton claimed he was taken prisoner by Lieutenant Hunt of Astley about Michaelmas, 1643 and forced to pay £1.13.4 for his release. The constable of the parish claimed 12s 9d for provender. John Mason senior wanted compensation for his gelding, worth £2.10 taken by Lieutenant Hunt to Astley and William King for a mare worth £2.13.4. (Exchequer accounts, SP 28/161)

== Notable people ==
- Kay Alexander, former BBC Midlands Today broadcaster
