= Carlton, Leicestershire =

Civil parish in Leicestershire, England

Coordinates: 52.6427°N 1.4180°W

Carlton
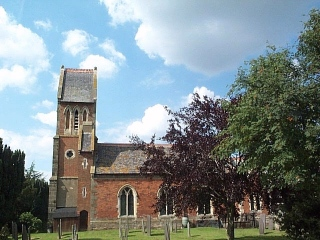
- St Andrew's Church, Carlton

- Location within Leicestershire
- Population: 305 (2011 Census)
- OS grid reference: SK394051
- Civil parish: Carlton
- District: Hinckley and Bosworth
- Shire county: Leicestershire
- Region: East Midlands
- Country: England
- Sovereign state: United Kingdom
- Post town: NUNEATON
- Postcode district: CV13
- Dialling code: 01455
- Police: Leicestershire
- Fire: Leicestershire
- Ambulance: East Midlands
- UK Parliament: Hinckley and Bosworth

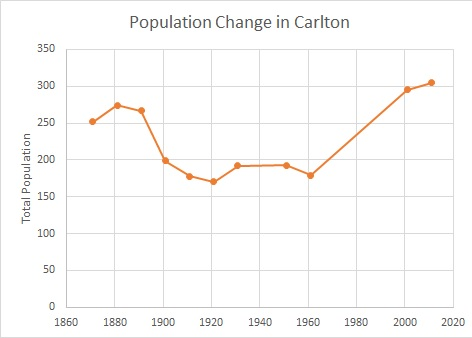
Total Population Change in Carlton between 1881 and 2011 according to collected Census data.

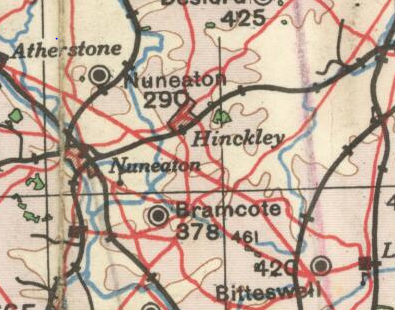
A map of Carlton, 1940, British War Office

Carlton is a small rural parish located east of the River Sence in Leicestershire, England, around 2.2 miles north of Market Bosworth. According to the 2011 census, Carlton has a population of 305 However, from 2014 it is estimated that there are around 330 people living there with a total of 283 registered electors.

== St Andrews Church ==
St Andrews in the centre of Carlton was restored after it was burnt down in 1764 with a mixture of both stone and brick and was dedicated to St Michael Then in 1867 another restoration was done by Goddard and Son, altering the windows and adding a saddleback top to the tower.. The building was Gothicised and its dedication was then changed to St Andrew. In the Northern Wall of the nave there is a stained glass window picturing the angels Michael and Gabriel created in the 1920s by Theadora Salusbury. In 1937 the clock tower was bought.

== History of Carlton ==
The village's name means 'farm/settlement of the free peasants'.

There is no mention of the parish in the doomsday book so it is likely a Norman settlement However the first Civil registration occurred in 1837, with the parish being registered in the Market Bosworth Sub-District. and from then Carlton was described as a chapelry in Market-Bosworth parish, Leicester; on the Ashby-de-la-Zouch canal.

In 1847, saw the Carltons first Public elementary school to be built, intending to educate 49 children other facilities were also built or revived including the St Andrews church, a Manor house in 1881 and the diamond jubilee orchard.

The population itself according to recent Census data has stayed relatively the same apart from dropping below 200 between 1901s data and 1961, and hitting a lowest of 170 in 1921, with the number of Males dropping to 84. Memorials of those who died in the war can be seen in St Andrew's church.

== Transport ==
Arriva Midlands operate service 153 at hourly intervals through the village with journeys terminating in nearby Market Bosworth and continuing into Leicester. The nearest train station is Leicester railway station which is nearly 20 miles away
