= Little Orton, Leicestershire =

Hamlet in Leicestershire, England

Coordinates: 52°38′58″N 01°32′16″W

Little Orton is a hamlet in the English county of Leicestershire.

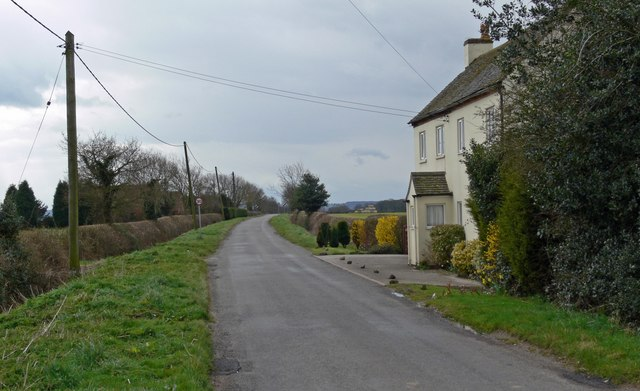
Orton Hill, Little Orton photographed March 2008

Little Orton is part of the civil parish of Twycross (where the population is included); it is located southwest of the main village being divided from it by the A444 road and Twycross Zoo.
