= Sence Valley Forest Park =

English park

Coordinates: 52°41′47.7″N 1°24′18.99″W

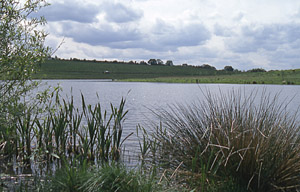
Sence Valley Forest Park

Sence Valley Forest Park is located between Ibstock and Heather in North West Leicestershire, and within the National Forest, England.

It is situated on the site of a former open cast mine where, between 1982 and 1996, eight million tonnes of coal were extracted by opencast mining. The 60-hectare site has since been transformed by tree planting and the creation of lakes and is now managed by Forestry England. The River Sence flows through the park. A series of paths provide access to a picnic area and the various fishing opportunities. There are also toilets and parking facilities for both the able bodied and the disabled.

The park is also home to Sence Valley Forest Park parkrun, a free timed 5km running and walking event held every Saturday at 9 am.
