= Shackerstone =

Village in Leicestershire, England

Coordinates: 52°39′N 1°26′W

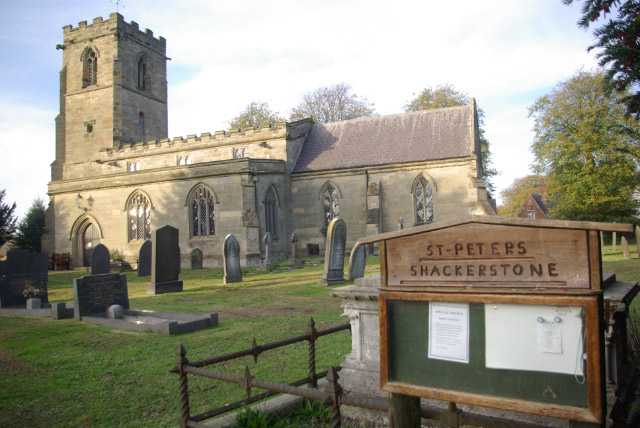
- St Peter's Church, Shackerstone

- Location within Leicestershire
- Population: 921 (2011 Census)
- District: Hinckley and Bosworth
- Shire county: Leicestershire
- Region: East Midlands
- Country: England
- Sovereign state: United Kingdom
- Post town: NUNEATON
- Postcode district: CV13
- Police: Leicestershire
- Fire: Leicestershire
- Ambulance: East Midlands
- UK Parliament: Hinckley and Bosworth

Shackerstone is a village and civil parish in the Hinckley and Bosworth district of Leicestershire, England. It is situated on the Ashby-de-la-Zouch Canal and the River Sence. According to the 2001 census the parish, which also includes the village of Barton in the Beans, had a population of 811, including Odstone which had risen to 921 at the 2011 census.

== History ==
In the Elizabethan era the Hall family were prominent in the village. They occupied the hall next to the church, known as Shakerstone Mannor. They sold this property in 1843, 13 years after Henry Edward and Sarah Theodosia Hall (William Shakespeare Hall's parents) had moved the family to the Swan River Colony.

During the Civil War, Shackerstone was near enough to Ashby de la Zouch to attract the attention of both parties. Parliamentary soldiers from Tamworth and Coventry stole horses, including a mare worth ten pounds from Mr. Hall. The local vicar, the Rev. John Hodges, was ejected from the living in 1646 and brought before the parliamentary sequestration committee for deserting his parish to join the royalist garrison at Ashby for four months. The commissioners charged him with frequenting the village alehouse on Sundays, and of being "a companion with fidlers and singers".

In the early eighteenth century, John Nichols records a fine church, a water mill and an absentee parson, Dr Adamthwaite, a prolific and energetic letter-writer, who was vicar from 1779 to 1811. This was a poor parish. By 1789 time the parson complained that he could not afford to live there, residing instead in Hampton in Arden, in Warwickshire some 24 miles away, where he had a curacy. He claimed that the parsonage had been "miserably beggared" by the previous incumbent who died insolvent in a gaol. The vicarage was "so entirely let down as that no sign remains of there ever having been one".

By 1 April 1805, the population seems to have slightly increased, a local census counting 51 families in Shackerstone, 53 families in Odstone and six in Barton, providing a total population of around 375.

== Transport ==
In 1804 the Ashby Canal was opened and Shackerstone is passed by it on the east. There are public moorings prior to bridge 52, and between bridges 52 and 53 are private moorings. The sharp turn by the station has been known to cause a certain amount of entertainment for the unwary boater.

Shackerstone railway station is on the Battlefield Line Railway, a preserved steam and diesel museum, that runs trains to Bosworth Battlefield. The railway came to Shackerstone in 1873 as part of the Ashby and Nuneaton Joint Railway and continued providing passenger services until 1931, after which only freight ran on the rails and the occasional special excursion trains. The stations claim to fame is that it was the first destination of the new London and North Western Railway Royal Train for King Edward VII in December 1902. The line was finally closed by British Rail in 1970 at which point the railway society arrived and has restored the station and reopened the line to Shenton Station, the terminus for Bosworth Battlefield.

== Landmarks ==
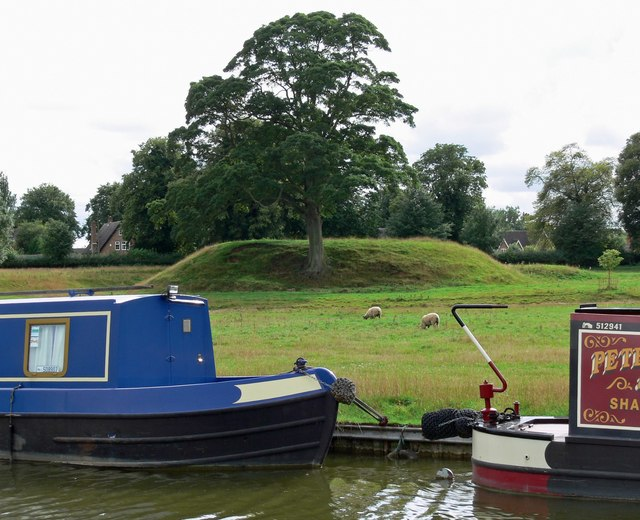
The motte and bailey

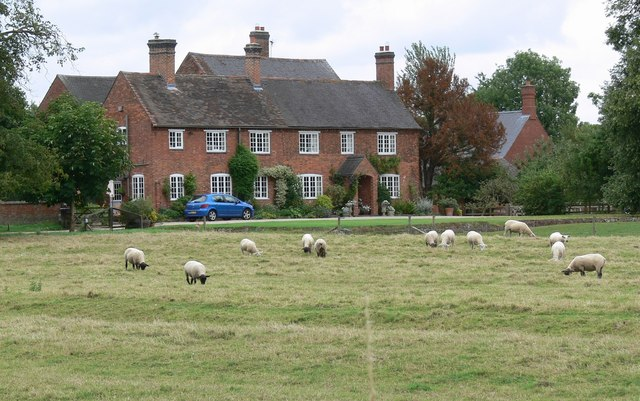
The Old House

During World War II, the remains of the motte-and-bailey castle in the village had an air raid shelter dug into it. It is believed that this still has a rocking chair within it.

Located close to Shackerstone was the stately home of Gopsall Hall home of Charles Jennens, a librettist and friend of George Frideric Handel.

== Culture and community ==
From 1994 to 2019 Shackerstone also hosted a large family festival, usually in the first week of September that covered everything from vintage cars to aerobatic stunt planes. The charity event is based around the a number of organising parties: the village, the canal, 4x4 group, an unaffiliated group and the railway. The festival was usually well attended by the public.
