= Wykin =

Hamlet in Leicestershire, England

Coordinates: 52°33′17″N 01°24′00″W

Wykin is a hamlet in the English county of Leicestershire.

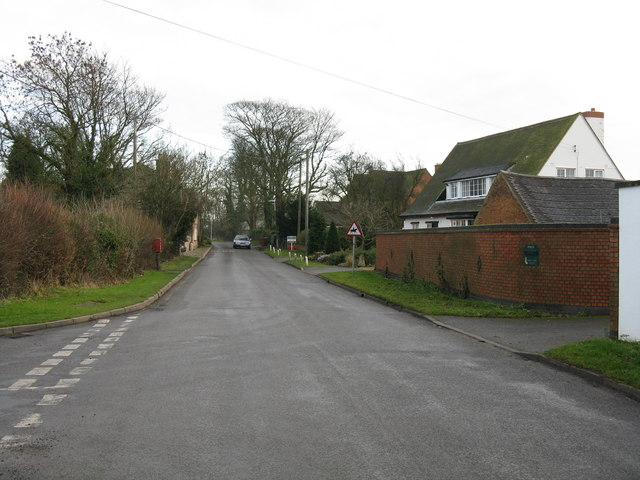
Wykin in December 2008

Wykin is located to the north-west of the town of Hinckley and is separated from it by the A47 Northern Perimeter Road.

For the purposes of local government Wykin is part of the Hinckley and Bosworth borough with the population being included in the Hinckley- Trinity ward of the borough.

== History ==
Wykin means a dairy farm and the area was historically an agricultural and farming area.

Wykin Hall farmhouse is one of the oldest buildings. The farmhouse is Grade II listed.

== Community ==
There is a children's play park.
