= Newton Burgoland =

Village in Leicestershire, England

Coordinates: 52.681904°N 1.446742°W

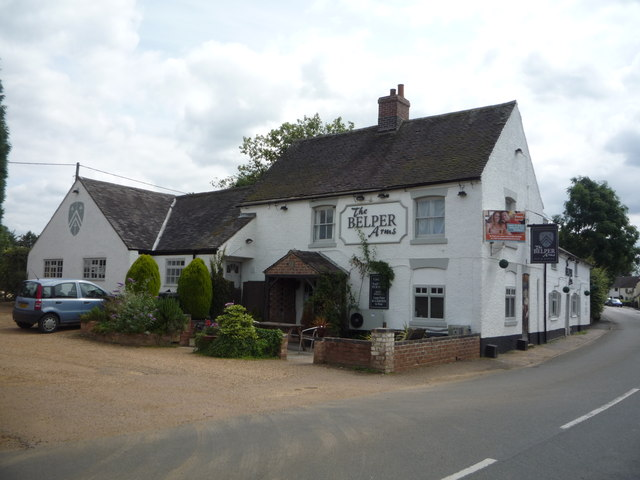
- The Belper Arms

- Location within Leicestershire
- OS grid reference: SK3709
- Civil parish: Swepstone and Newton Burgoland
- District: North West Leicestershire
- Shire county: Leicestershire
- Region: East Midlands
- Country: England
- Sovereign state: United Kingdom
- Post town: Coalville
- Postcode district: LE67
- Police: Leicestershire
- Fire: Leicestershire
- Ambulance: East Midlands

Newton Burgoland is a village in the civil parish of Swepstone and Newton Burgoland, in the North West Leicestershire district of Leicestershire, England. The Swepstone parish used to include a small settlement named Newton-Nethercote, which formed part of the village, but that is now part of the rest of Newton Burgoland. The population is included in the civil parish of Swepstone.

The place-name is first attested in the Domesday Book of 1086, where it appears as Neutone. It is referred to as Neuton Burgilon in 1390. The name "Newton" means "new homestead or village". The "Burgoland" element refers to the Burgilon family, the name meaning "Burgundian".

The village contains a public house, "The Belper Arms", which is identified as the oldest pub in Leicestershire. The pub dates back to 1290 when which it was named "The Shepherd and the Shepherdess Inn". During the Second World War, the village was highly affected by German bombing which took place in surrounding villages such as Odstone, Measham and Heather. In 1940, evacuees were escorted to the village notably from Coventry, Birmingham and London to escape the bombing in such cities. Nearby Gopsall Hall was later requisitioned as a barracks for British soldiers during the war, who visited public houses in Newton Burgoland such as "The Belper Arms" and "The Spade Tree".

The village contains a primary school situated on School Lane. Children attending the school typically transfer when aged 11 to Ibstock Community College, The Market Bosworth School or elsewhere.

The famous cinema and church organ builder, John Compton, was born in Newton Burgoland.
