= Twycross =

Village in England

Coordinates: 52.641°N 1.503°W

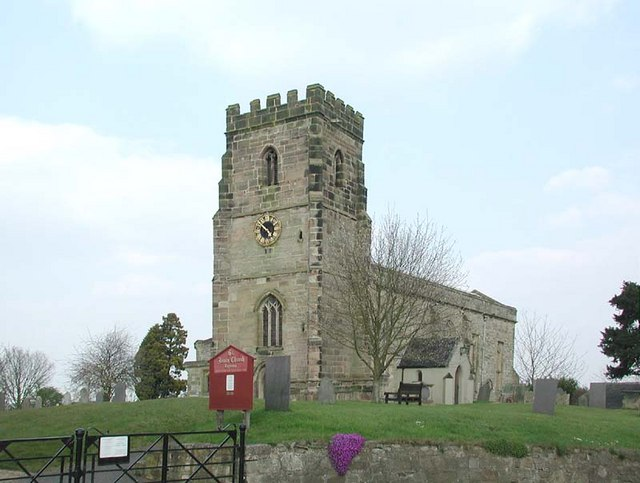
- Saint James' Parish Church, Twycross

- Location within Leicestershire
- Population: 850 (2011)
- OS grid reference: SK336050
- Civil parish: Twycross
- District: Hinckley and Bosworth
- Shire county: Leicestershire
- Region: East Midlands
- Country: England
- Sovereign state: United Kingdom
- Post town: Atherstone
- Postcode district: CV9
- Dialling code: 01827
- Police: Leicestershire
- Fire: Leicestershire
- Ambulance: East Midlands
- UK Parliament: Hinckley and Bosworth

Twycross is a small village and civil parish in the Hinckley and Bosworth district, in Leicestershire, England, on the A444 road. Situated in the far west of the county and close to the North Warwickshire border, the population of the civil parish at the 2011 census was 850. The civil parish includes the villages of Norton Juxta Twycross and Orton on the Hill and the hamlets of Little Orton and Little Twycross, as well as Twycross Zoo, and the selective, private Twycross House School.

The Twycross Cricket Club is a village club with a 1st and 2nd XI who play in the Leicestershire Senior League. It also has a Sunday XI which plays many friendly games throughout the season.

The 1st team XI play regularly in the Premier division, whilst the 2nd team XI play in division 3, which hosts a 1st team and 2nd teams while also holding a Sunday friendly team. It has a youth set-up with under-15, under-13, and under-11 teams.

The church of St. James contains the oldest stained glass in England, originally from Sainte-Chapelle, Saint-Denis, and Le Mans Cathedral. The earliest glass is c. 1145 from Saint-Denis, the panels having been presented to William IV who gave them to Earl Howe, who got the glazier Thomas Willement to arrange and install them in the church during its restoration in the 1840s.

Twycross is the home of Rare, a video game developer owned by Xbox Game Studios.

== History ==
"A Dictionary of British Place Names", by A. D. Mills, says it was recorded as Tvicros in the Domesday Book, from Old English twī cros, a place with 'two crosses'. The owners of the estate, listed in the Domesday book, 1086AD, were: Tenant-in-chief in 1086: Henry of Ferrers. Lord in 1086: Nigel (of Stafford). The A444 connects it to Burton-on-Trent and Coventry and the B4116/B4114 to Birmingham. These two routes cross each other, but share a common route through part of the village, in effect a staggered crossroads.

On 1 April 1935 the parishes of Gopsall, Norton juxta Twycross and Orton on the Hill were merged with Twycross.
