= Fenny Drayton =

Village in Leicestershire, England

- Village
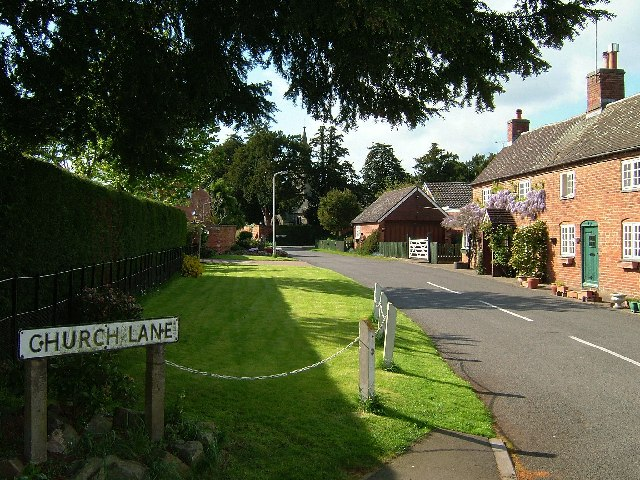
- Church Lane, Fenny Drayton

- Location within Leicestershire
- Civil parish: Witherley
- District: Hinckley and Bosworth
- Shire county: Leicestershire
- Region: East Midlands
- Country: England
- Sovereign state: United Kingdom
- Post town: NUNEATON
- Postcode district: CV13
- Police: Leicestershire
- Fire: Leicestershire
- Ambulance: East Midlands
- UK Parliament: Hinckley and Bosworth

Fenny Drayton (once Drayton-in-the-Clay) is a village and former civil parish, now in the parish of Witherley, in the Hinckley and Bosworth district of Leicestershire, England. It lies near the Warwickshire boundary, three miles south-east of Atherstone in the Coventry postcode area, just off the A444, the Roman Watling Street. Another Roman road crosses at the end of the scenic Fenn Lanes. The village is four miles from Stoke Golding, where Henry VII of England was crowned after the Battle of Bosworth in 1485. The reinterment of Richard III of England on 21 March 2015 started along Fenn Lanes, near the village. In 1931 the parish had a population of 125. On 1 April 1935 the parish was abolished and merged with Witherley, parts also went to Hartshill, Mancetter and Caldecote. The name means "farm/settlement for portage" or "farm/settlement used as a dragging place". "Fenny" reflects the fen-like ground along the Roman road.

== Education ==
School children mostly attend St Margaret's Church of England Primary School in Stoke Golding or Higham on the hill Church of England Primary School and St Martin's Catholic Academy in Stoke Golding or the independent Dixie Grammar School in Market Bosworth.

== Church ==
The Grade II listed Anglican Church of St Michael and All Angels in the Diocese of Leicester is in Gothic style with 12th-century Norman features and a 13th-century bell tower. It is surrounded by one of the oldest circles of giant yew trees in the United Kingdom. There are two monuments of the Purefoy family dating back to 1543 in the church grounds. One has an incised slab, which is rare. The church is open free of charge by appointment.

=== George Fox ===
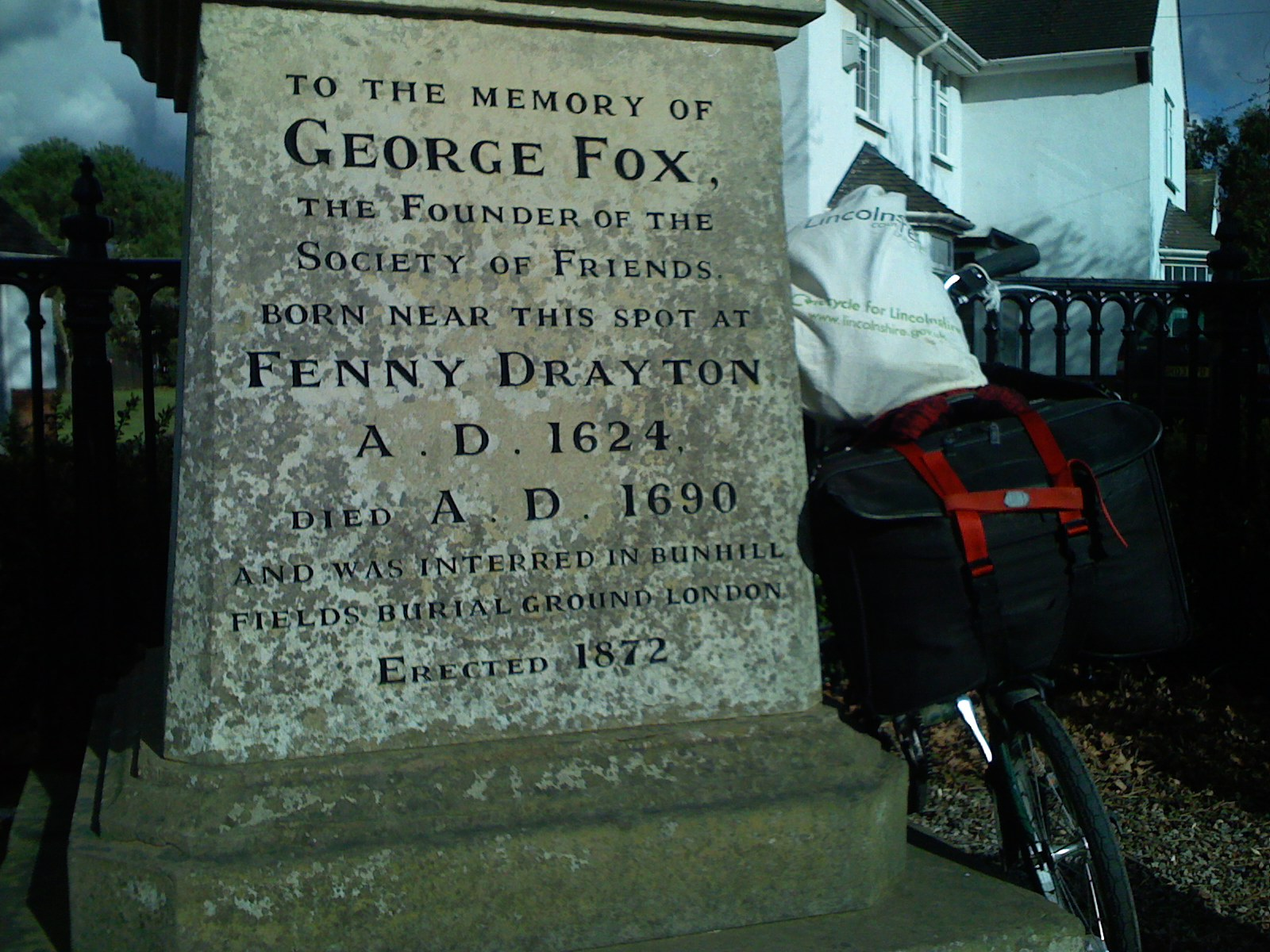
George Fox memorial

George Fox, founder of the Religious Society of Friends, or children of light, was born in Drayton-on-the-Clay in July 1624. His father, Christopher Fox, was a weaver and churchwarden. Fox is reputed to have been baptised in the older of the two fonts in the church. There is a large monument to him where two roads, George Fox Lane and Old Forge Road, meet. Quakers from all over the world sign the church visitors' book. Fox referred to his town as "Drayton-of-the-Clay".

== Centre of England ==
The Ordnance Survey in 2002 defined Lindley Hall Farm on the village outskirts as the geographical centre of England. (SP362964) Coordinates are 52°33′42.942″N 1°27′53.474″W Grid Reference SP36373.66 96143.05. It was previously thought to be Meriden near Solihull.

== See also ==
- Meriden, Warwickshire, 18 km (11 mi) south, previously thought to be the geographical centre of England
- Coton in the Elms, Derbyshire, 24 kilometres (15 mi) north, "furthest point from the sea" in Britain
