= Alton, Leicestershire =

Deserted medieval village in Leicestershire, England

Coordinates: 52.731°N 1.423°W

Alton is a deserted medieval village between Coalville and Ashby-de-la-Zouch, in North West Leicestershire, England.

The earliest documentation of the village is found in the Domesday Book where it appears as Heletone. The land was rented out to someone by Hugh de Grandmesnil, and had a total value of 60 shillings. There were 25 villagers, 1 being a man at arms and 4 smallholders. There were 8 ploughs, 1 mill, 4 acres of meadow, woodland 1 league long. The name is probably derived from ald, and the suffix tūn, meaning "old settlement".

It is one of only four villages in Leicestershire that seems to have been deserted as a result of grange formation, the others being Dishley, Ringlethorp and Weston. The most important possessor of granges in Leicestershire was the Cistercian Garendon Abbey whose economy was largely based on sheep farming.

Nothing remains of the village other than a few vague topographical features.
