= A444 road =

Road in the West Midlands, England

Coordinates: 52.5994°N 1.47749°W

A444

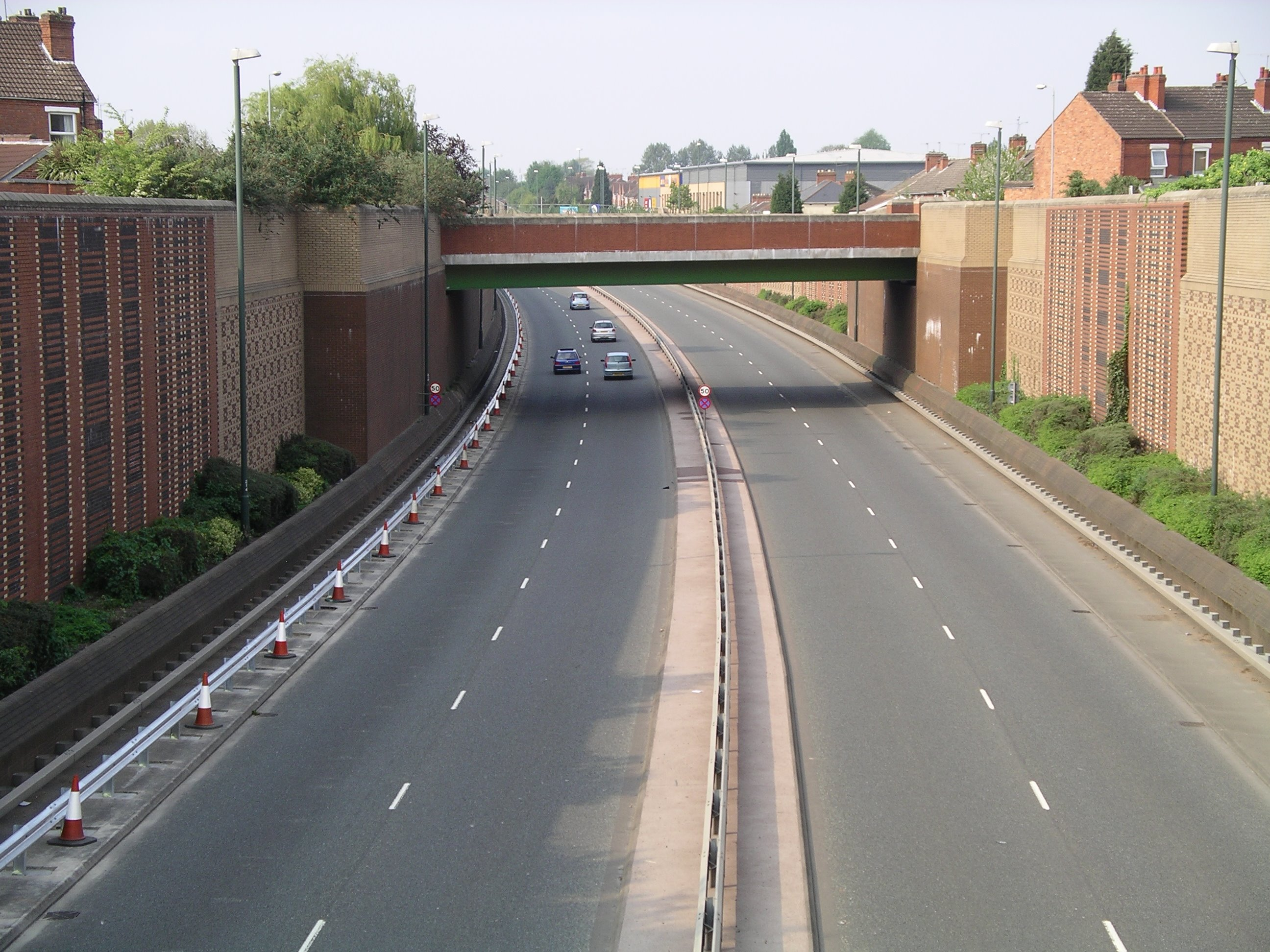
- The A444 in Coventry showing the Heath Road bridge

Route information
- Length: 32 mi (51 km)

Major junctions
- South end: Coventry
- A4600 A428; M6; A47; A5 M42; A42 A514 A5189 A511
- North end: Burton upon Trent

Location
- Country: United Kingdom
- Primary destinations: Coventry; Bedworth; Nuneaton; Twycross; Appleby Magna; Measham; Swadlincote; Burton-upon-Trent

Road network
- Roads in the United Kingdom; Motorways; A and B road zones
← A443	→ A445

The A444 is a primary road running between Coventry and Burton upon Trent in England, usually referred to as the "A treble four" or "A triple four".

== Route ==
=== Coventry to A5 ===
Starting at the junction of the A45 and A46 at Festival Island west of Baginton just south of Coventry, the road runs as a dual-carriageway one mile north to the Whitley junction. Here there is a break in the road and it starts again at the roundabout where the A428 Sky Blue Way/Binley Road and the B4110 Humber Road meet in Gosford Green just east of Coventry. From there it heads north as a dual-carriageway road, crossing the M6 at junction 3. It bypasses Bedworth to the west and heads into Nuneaton passing the George Eliot Hospital. The road continues into Nuneaton town centre and is notoriously bad for traffic during busy periods. The road then heads away from Nuneaton, through Weddington and crossing the A5 Watling Street.

=== A5 to Burton upon Trent ===
Becoming a rural single-carriageway road passing through Leicestershire countryside, it passes near to the outskirts of the village of Fenny Drayton and crosses farmland of nearby Lindley Hall Farm, the geographical centre of England (according to the Ordnance Survey). The road also passes near the site of the Battle of Bosworth. It meets the end of the M42 (and therefore the start of the A42) in Appleby Magna where it enters South Derbyshire, through Castle Gresley where it meets the A514, eventually descending into Burton upon Trent to connect with the A5189 to finally terminate on the A511.

== Improvements ==
Between the late 1980s and mid-1990s, a dual-carriageway road was constructed in phases connecting Coventry, Sky Blue Way and Nuneaton to provide a more direct link between Coventry city centre and the M6 motorway. The town of Bedworth had already been by-passed during the 1970s and this followed a continuation of this route, the first phase opening in 1990 and the second in 1995.

This section of road is now known as Jimmy Hill Way (formerly Phoenix Way) and was constructed along the course of a disused railway line. The former route of the A444 was then reclassified as part of the B4113. Initially, there were plans to create a north−south link road through Coventry, extending Phoenix Way south past its current terminus roundabout, as there is a section of dual carriageway that continues as the A46, numbered as the A444 to the south of the city, but such plans were dropped during the construction of the Coventry to Nuneaton section.

In Castle Gresley on 16 June 1995, a 0.8 mile bypass was built to allow traffic to go around the village, without having to go down Mount Pleasant Road, which was previously part of the A444. The bypass is national speed limit, the closest part to Burton upon Trent which has a crawler lane on the uphill side.

In 2020/2021, work has been completed on the M42/A42 J11 exit (where the A444 meets), adding traffic lights to the roundabout, as well as work completed on the A444 towards Burton upon Trent, where the speed limit for part of the road has been reduced to 50 mph. This is to make way for a new development known as Mercia Park, which is utilised by Jaguar Land Rover and logistics firms.

== Former routes ==
- Between Coventry and Nuneaton, the A444 used to follow what is now the B4113 road.
- The A444 used to run between Coventry and Leamington Spa following the B4113. There is still a road sign on the B4113 indicating this.

== Gallery ==
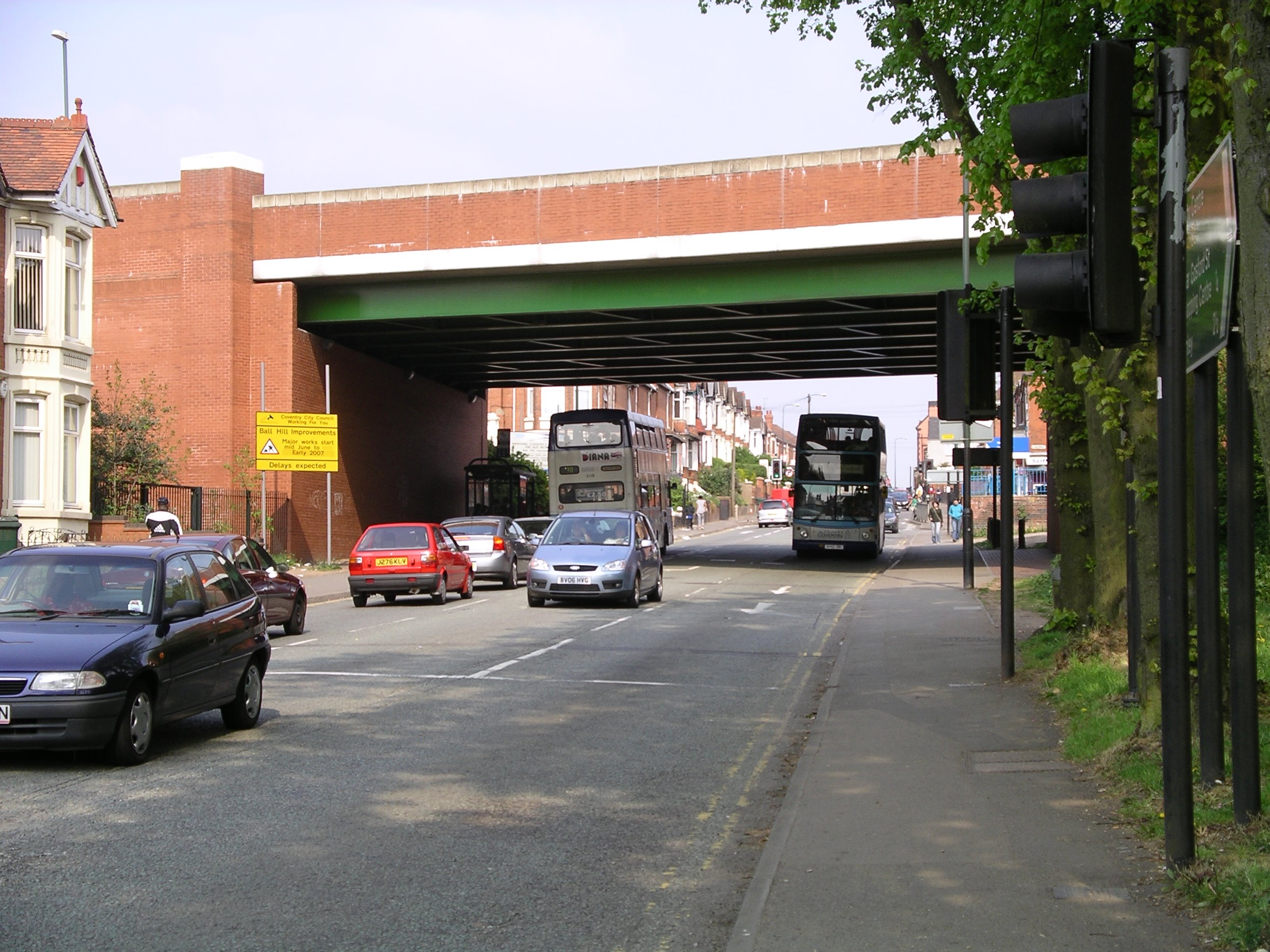
The bridge for (the A444) Phoenix Way over Walsgrave Road, Gosford Green

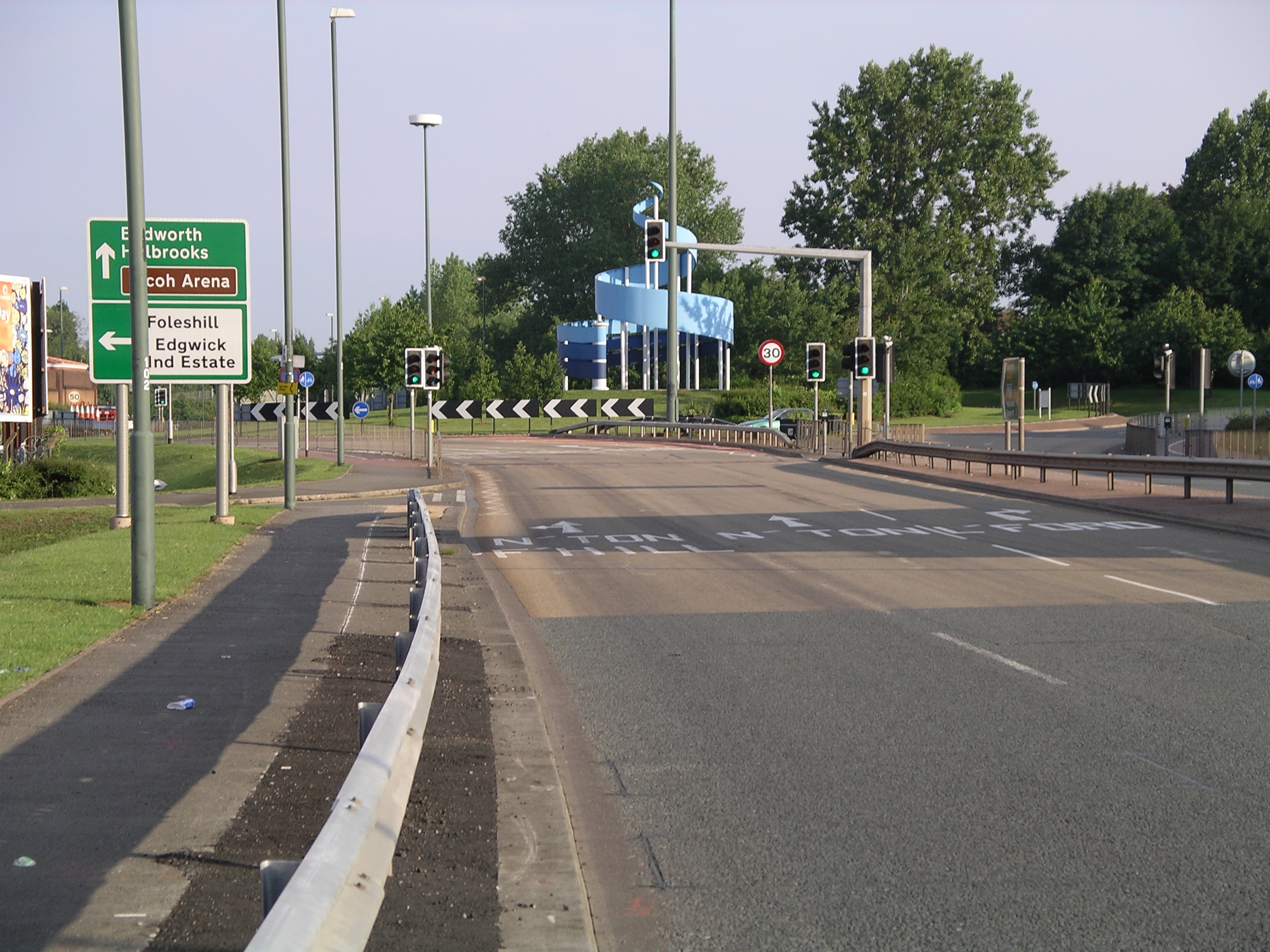
Phoenix Way/Foleshill Road traffic island

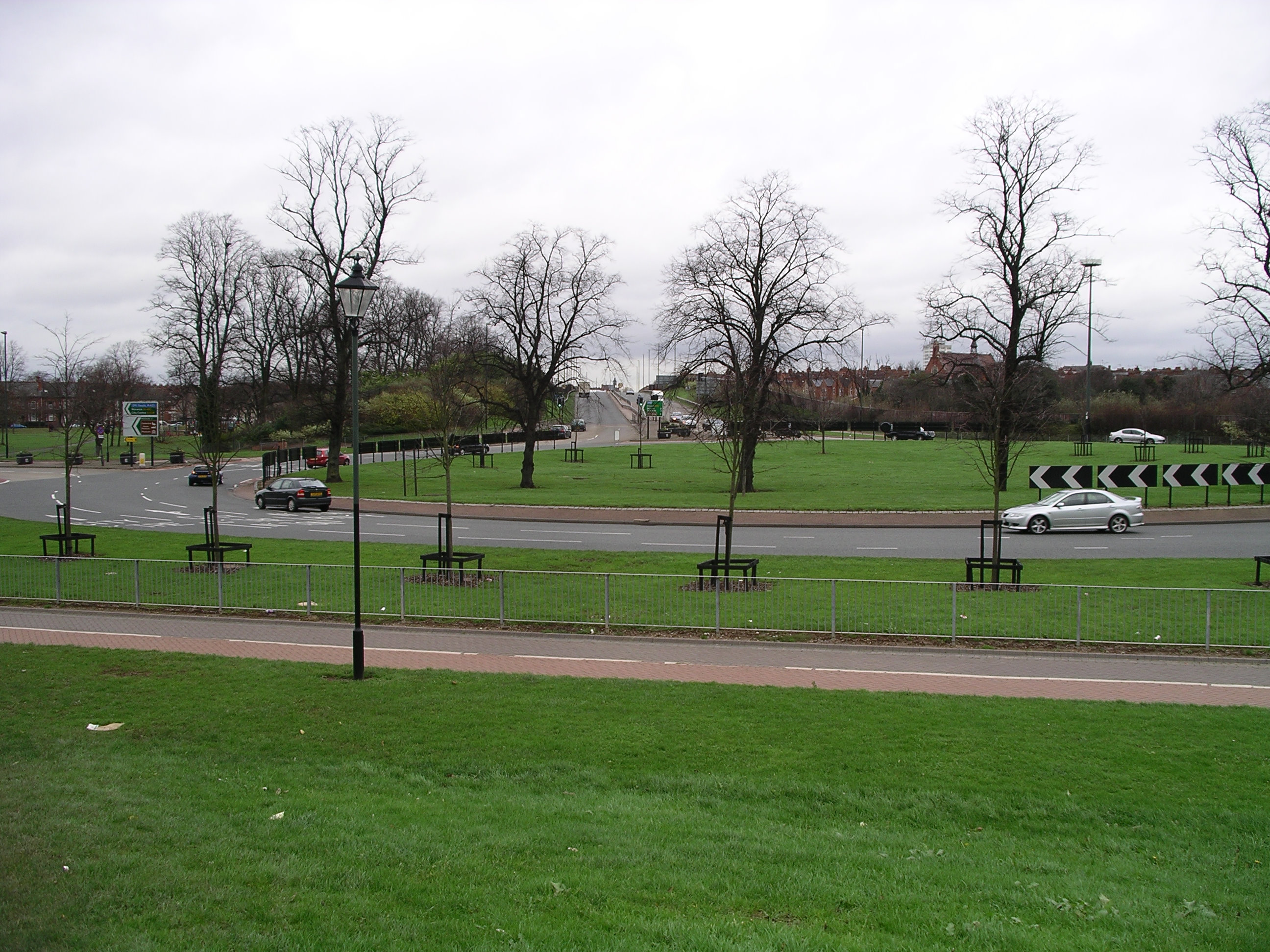
The southern termination of Phoenix Way
