= Leicestershire Fire and Rescue Service =

Fire and rescue service in England

Operational area
- Country: England

Agency overview
- Chief Fire Officer: Callum Faint
- Motto: FOR' ARD - FOR' ARD

Facilities and equipment
- Stations: 20

Website
- leics-fire.gov.uk

Leicestershire Fire and Rescue Service (LFRS) is the fire and rescue service which serves the ceremonial counties of Leicestershire and Rutland in England. The service's headquarters are in Birstall, on the outskirts of Leicester.

== History ==
The Leicestershire and Rutland Fire Brigade and the separate City of Leicester Fire Brigade were created in 1948 by the Fire Services Act 1947. In 1974 the City of Leicester brigade was merged with the Leicestershire and Rutland brigade to form the present fire service.

Since Rutland and the City of Leicester became unitary authorities in the 1990s, the fire authority which administers the service is a joint-board made up of representatives from Leicester City Council, Leicestershire County Council and Rutland County Council.

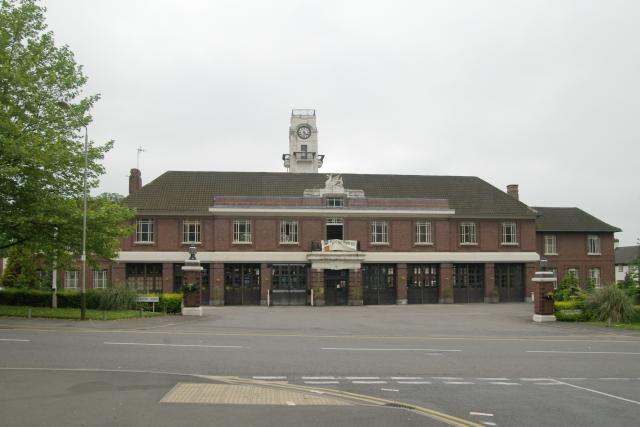
The Grade-II listed Leicester Central Fire Station (1925–27)

== Performance ==
Every fire and rescue service in England and Wales is periodically subjected to a statutory inspection by His Majesty's Inspectorate of Constabulary and Fire & Rescue Services (HMICFRS). The inspections investigate how well the service performs in each of three areas. On a scale of outstanding, good, requires improvement and inadequate, Leicestershire Fire and Rescue Service was rated as follows:

HMICFRS Inspection Leicestershire
Area	Rating 2018/19	Rating 2021/22	Description
Effectiveness	Requires Improvement	Good	How effective is the fire and rescue service at keeping people safe and secure from fire and other risks?
Efficiency	Requires Improvement	Requires Improvement	How efficient is the fire and rescue service at keeping people safe and secure from fire and other risks?
People	Requires Improvement	Good	How well does the fire and rescue service look after its people?

== Fire stations ==
LFRS operates 20 fire stations that are crewed on a combination of duty systems:

- Wholetime – firefighters crew the station 24/7
- Day-crewed – firefighters crew the station during daytime
- Day-crewing Plus – firefighter self roster their own working routine and can be on duty on station for up to five days and nights in a row
- On-call – retained firefighters remain on-call in the local area and respond when needed, whether at home or work

== See also ==
- List of British firefighters killed in the line of duty
