= Three Horseshoes =

Three Horseshoes may refer to:

- Three Horseshoes, Southall, a pub in London, England
- Three Horseshoes, Whitwick, a pub in Leicestershire, England
- The Three Horseshoes, Monmouth, a pub in Monmouth, Wales
- Three Horse Shoes railway signal box, near Turves, Cambridgeshire, England
- Tap on the Tutt, a pub in North Yorkshire, England, formerly known as the Three Horseshoes
