= Donington =

Donington is the name of a number of places in England:

- Donington, Lincolnshire, a small town in South Holland, Lincolnshire
- Donington, Shropshire, a civil parish in Shropshire, England
- Donington on Bain, a village in Lindsey, Lincolnshire
- Donington le Heath, Leicestershire, England
  - location of Donington le Heath Manor House Museum
- Castle Donington, a town in the north of Leicestershire
  - Donington Hall, a mansion house set in parkland near Castle Donington
  - Donington Park, a motor racing track and music festival venue near Castle Donington
  - Donington Park motorway services, a motorway services station near Castle Donington

== See also ==
- Mary Donington, British sculptor
- Robert Donington, British musicologist and early-music instrumentalist
- Donnington (disambiguation)
