= Ravenstone =

A ravenstone is a place of execution, akin to gallows.

Ravenstone may also refer to:

- Ravenstone (brand), a destination gift shop and online retailer
- Ravenstone, Buckinghamshire, City of Milton Keynes, England
- Ravenstone, Leicestershire, England
- Ravenstone with Snibston, a civil parish in Leicestershire
- Ravenstone (band)
