= Hugglescote =

Village in Leicestershire, England

Coordinates: 52.711°N 1.371°W

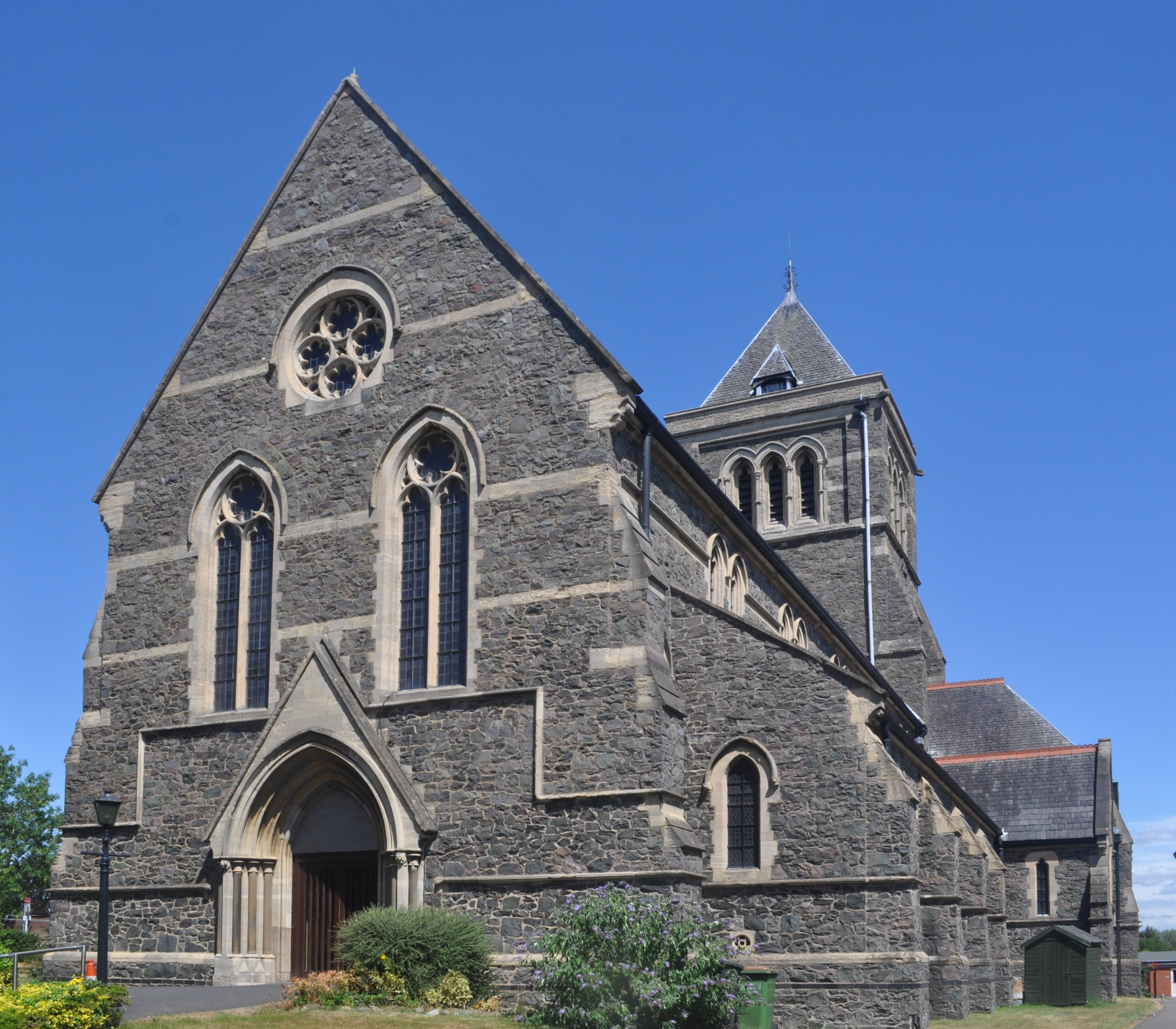
- St John the Baptist parish church in 2025

- Location within Leicestershire
- Population: 4,189 (ward, 2001 census)
- OS grid reference: SK4212
- Civil parish: Hugglescote and Donington le Heath
- District: North West Leicestershire
- Shire county: Leicestershire
- Region: East Midlands
- Country: England
- Sovereign state: United Kingdom
- Post town: Coalville
- Postcode district: LE67
- Dialling code: 01530
- Police: Leicestershire
- Fire: Leicestershire
- Ambulance: East Midlands
- UK Parliament: North West Leicestershire
- Website: Hugglescote and Donington le Heath Parish Council

Hugglescote is a village on the River Sence in North West Leicestershire, England. The village is about 1 mile (1.6 km) south of the centre of Coalville, and its built-up area is now contiguous with the town.

Hugglescote and Donington le Heath were part of the parish of Ibstock until 1878, when they were formed into a separate civil parish. Against local belief, Hugglescote is not classed as Coalville. The civil parish of Hugglescote and Donington le Heath was reinstated by an order made in May 2010, and the new parish council held its first meeting in May 2011.

== Manor ==
The manor was held by Hugh le Despencer in 1217 and was in various hands until 1464 when the king granted it to William Hastings.

In 1463 William Beaumont, 2nd Viscount Beaumont held the manors of Donington and Hugglescote. However, in the Wars of the Roses Beaumont had fought for the House of Lancaster so he was attaindered and Edward IV granted Donington and Hugglescote to the Yorkist courtier William Hastings, 1st Baron Hastings.

As of 1831 the Marquis of hastings was lord of the manor.

The Hastings family's manor house has been lost. It had a formal garden in which a red brick building was erected in about 1700 and altered in about 1820. The building survives but part of its stone slate roof has collapsed.

== Church and chapels ==
=== Church of England ===
There was an old Church of England chapel of ease in Dennis Street which was replaced by a Georgian chapel of Saint James in 1776. Hugglescote's population outgrew the chapel and so the present Church of England parish church of Saint John the Baptist was built on a new site in Grange Road and consecrated in 1879. St. John's is a Gothic Revival building designed by the architect J. B. Everard in an Early English style. The first vicar, Canon H. E. Broughton, was installed in 1878 and died in office in 1924. He is commemorated by a reredos installed in St. John's in 1937 and a nearby road-name, Broughton Street.

St. John's is built largely of local materials: Charnwood granite rubble, Swithland slate, Ibstock brick and Coalville ceramic floor tiles. The nave has five-bay arcades with Shap granite columns and a clerestory with paired lancet windows. St. John's has a transeptal south chapel and a central belltower over the crossing. The building was extended in 1887. The tower has a ring of eight bells, all cast by John Taylor & Co of Loughborough in 1900. St. John's is a Grade II* listed building.

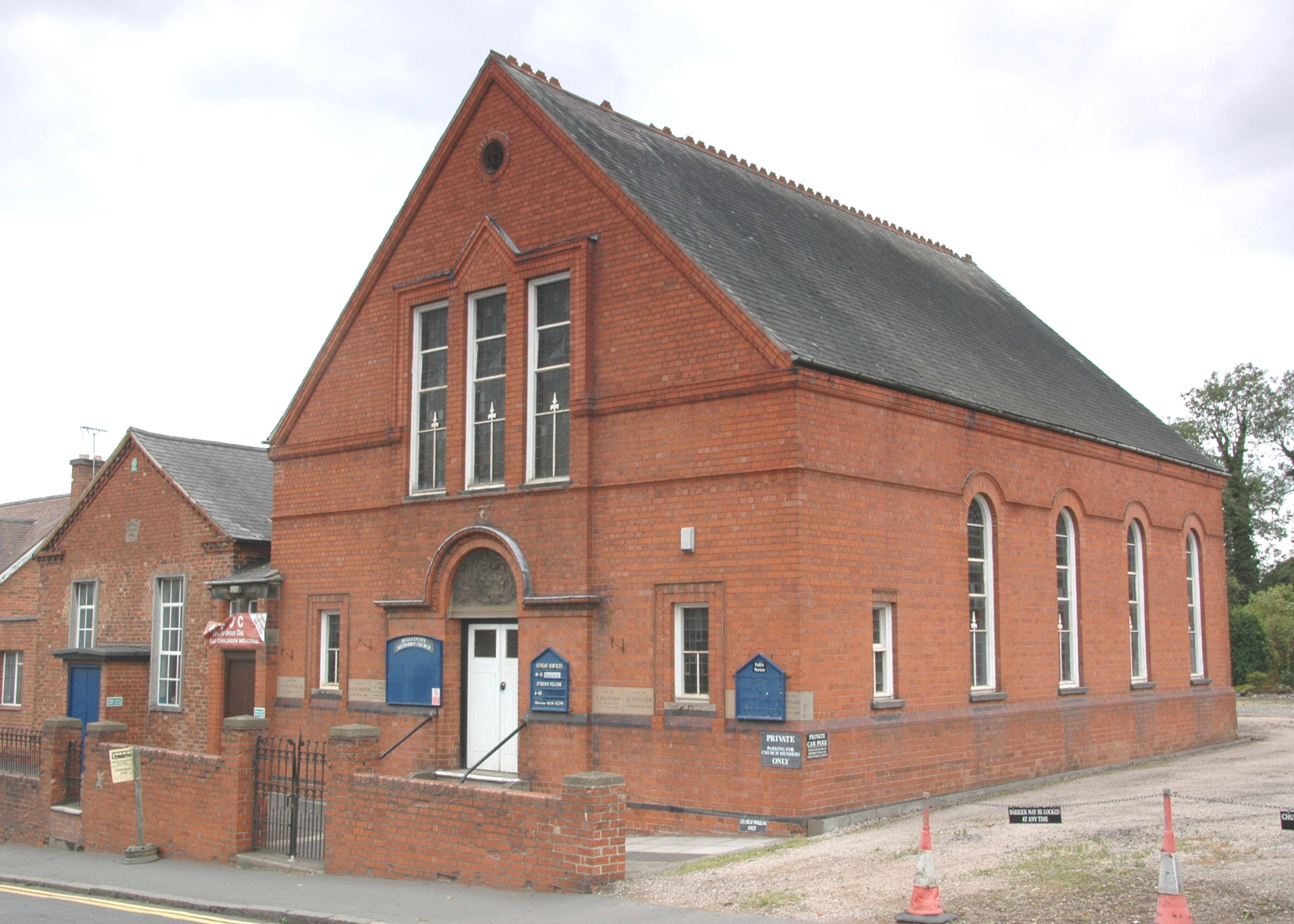
Wesleyan Chapel, now Hugglescote Methodist Church. The original 1831 chapel is on the left. The larger building on the right was added in 1891.

St. John's has an Elizabethan chalice dating from 1575 and a parish chest from the former chapel. The parish registers date from 1564.

St. John's is the largest place of worship in the area, seating some 600 people. It is now part of a combined benefice with the parishes of Ellistown and Snibston.

=== Methodist ===
A Wesleyan chapel in Station Road was completed in 1831 and extended in 1891. It is now Hugglescote Methodist Church.

=== Baptist ===
Hugglescote had a Baptist chapel in Dennis Street. The building is now closed but the Baptist congregation continues to worship in Hugglescote Community Primary School.

== Economic and social history ==
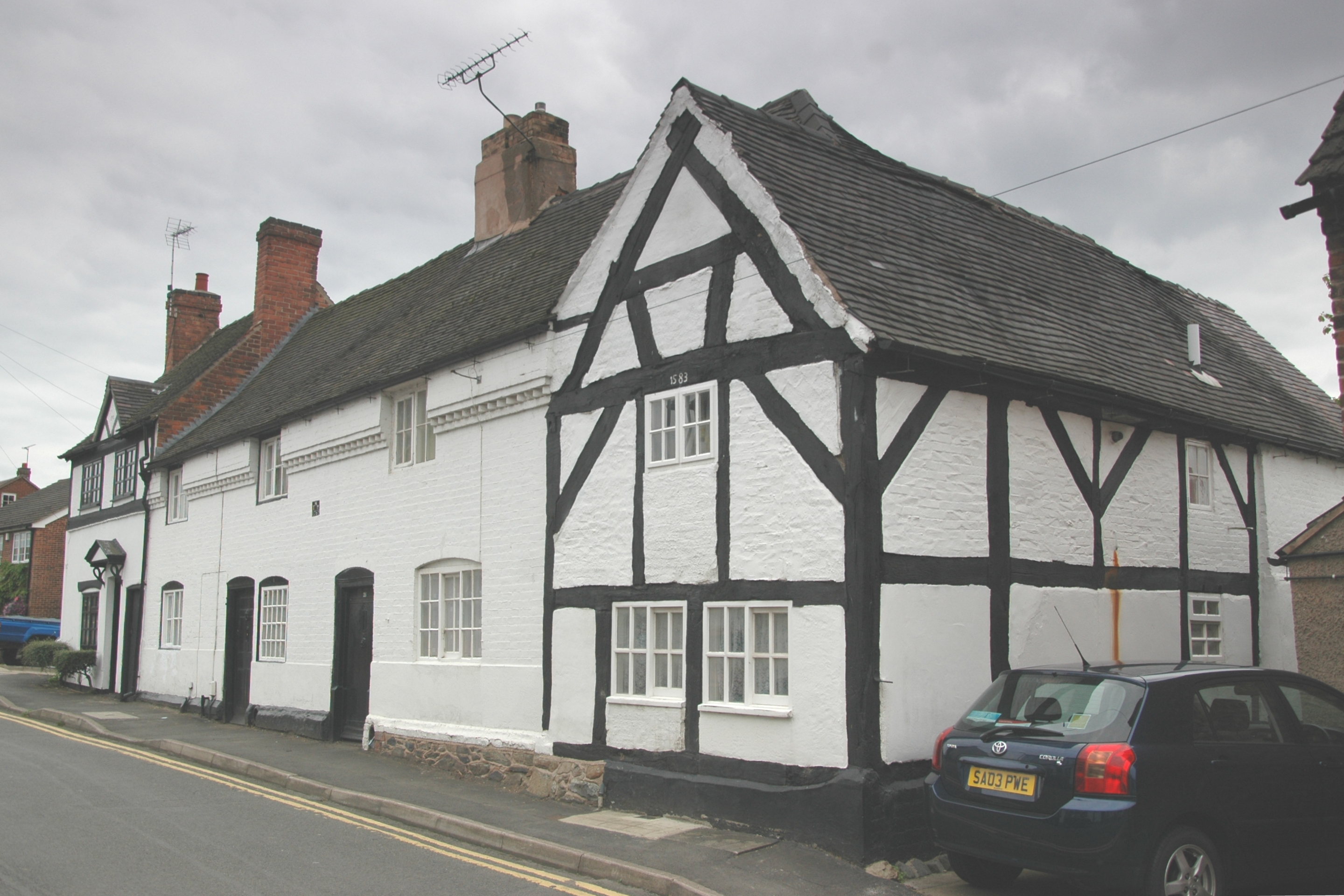
26 and 28 Dennis Street, built 1583 (timber-framed part on right) and extended 1761 (all-brick part on left)

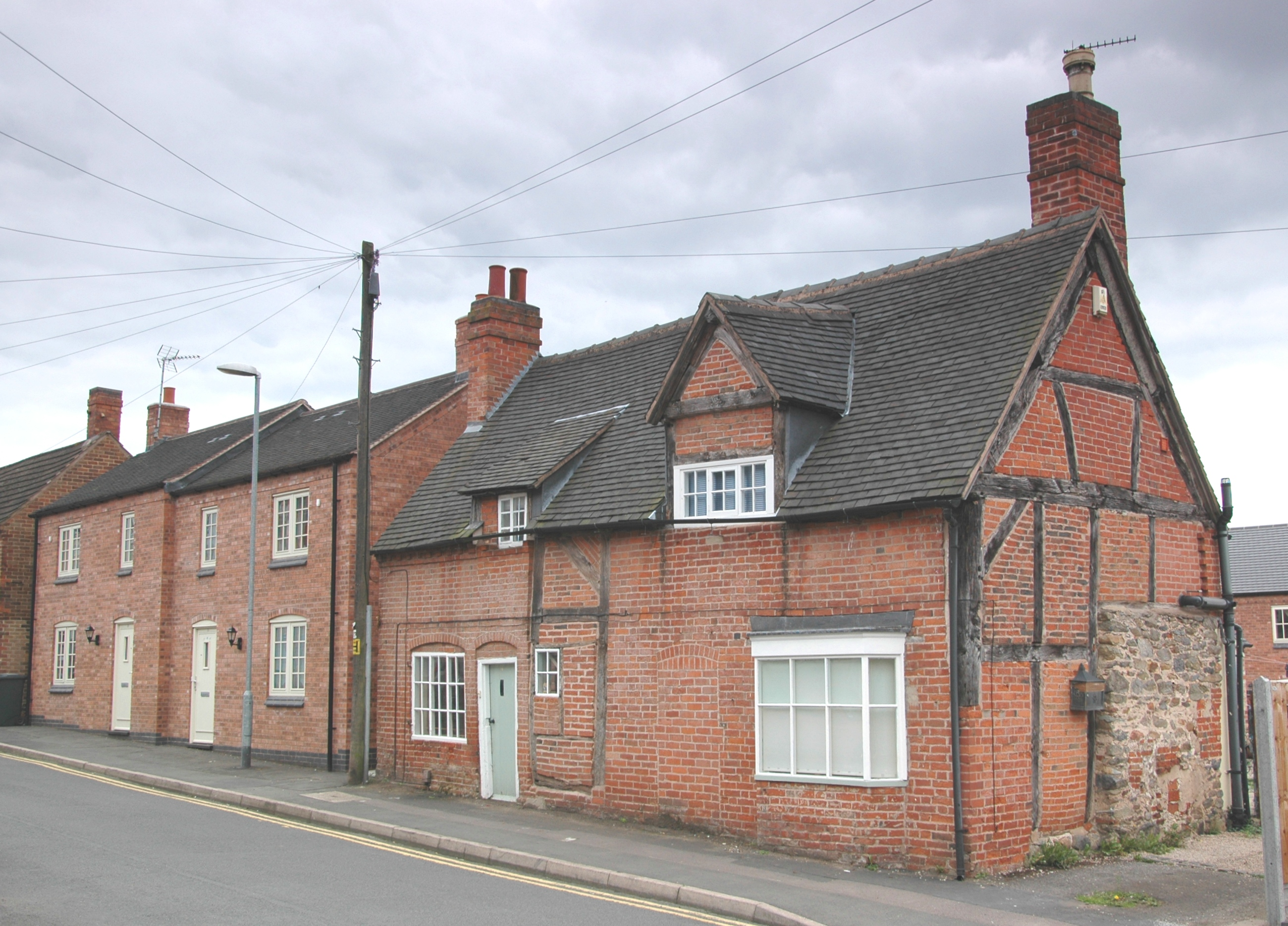
16 Dennis Street, built in the 17th century

A few historic cottages survive in Dennis Street. 26 and 28 Dennis Street are two timber-framed cottages, one of which has the date 1583 on a collar beam and thus dates from the period that W. G. Hoskins identified as the Great Rebuilding of England. The gable end has collar and tie beams and queen struts. The building was extended eastwards in 1761. In 1960 Hoskins considered the original part of the building to be the oldest dated cottage in a Leicestershire village.

16 Dennis Street is a timber-framed cottage with brick nogging that was mainly built in the 17th century, although the original part of the cottage was built in 1590, and has some alterations from the 19th or late 18th centuries. The staircase is in a semicircular extension at the rear of the cottage. 15 Dennis Street is a cottage built of brick with a Swithland slate roof and the date 1757 on a brick over the front door.

The soil is in some parts of clay but in others a light sandy loam. In 1831 the number of houses was 127 and the population 683. Farmland in the township was enclosed in 1774. In 1945 this estate was sold by Brigadier C. L. O. Tayleur.

By 1848 Donington and Hugglescote had a National School. It moved into a new building completed in 1862, and an infants' school was added in 1883. The 1862 and 1883 buildings are now Hugglescote Community Centre.

Construction of the Ashby and Nuneaton Joint Railway began in 1869 and it opened in 1873. The ANJR had a branch from Shackerstone through Hugglescote to Coalville Town. Hugglescote railway station had a junction to the north of it added in 1883, when the Charnwood Forest Railway opened from here to Loughborough Derby Road. The London, Midland and Scottish Railway absorbed both lines in the 1923 grouping and withdrew passenger services from both lines in 1931. Nationalisation in 1948 made the lines part of British Railways, which withdrew freight services from the Charnwood Forest line in 1963 and from the Ashby and Nuneaton line in 1971.

=== Notable residents ===
The Victorian hymnist, Henry Dennis (1818–87) lived in Hugglescote for forty years and is buried in the old Baptist Cemetery off Grange Road: Dennis Street is named after him. In the same cemetery is the tomb of William Stenson (1770–1861), the mining engineer and founder of Whitwick Colliery, who has sometimes been described as "the father of Coalville".

== Amenities ==
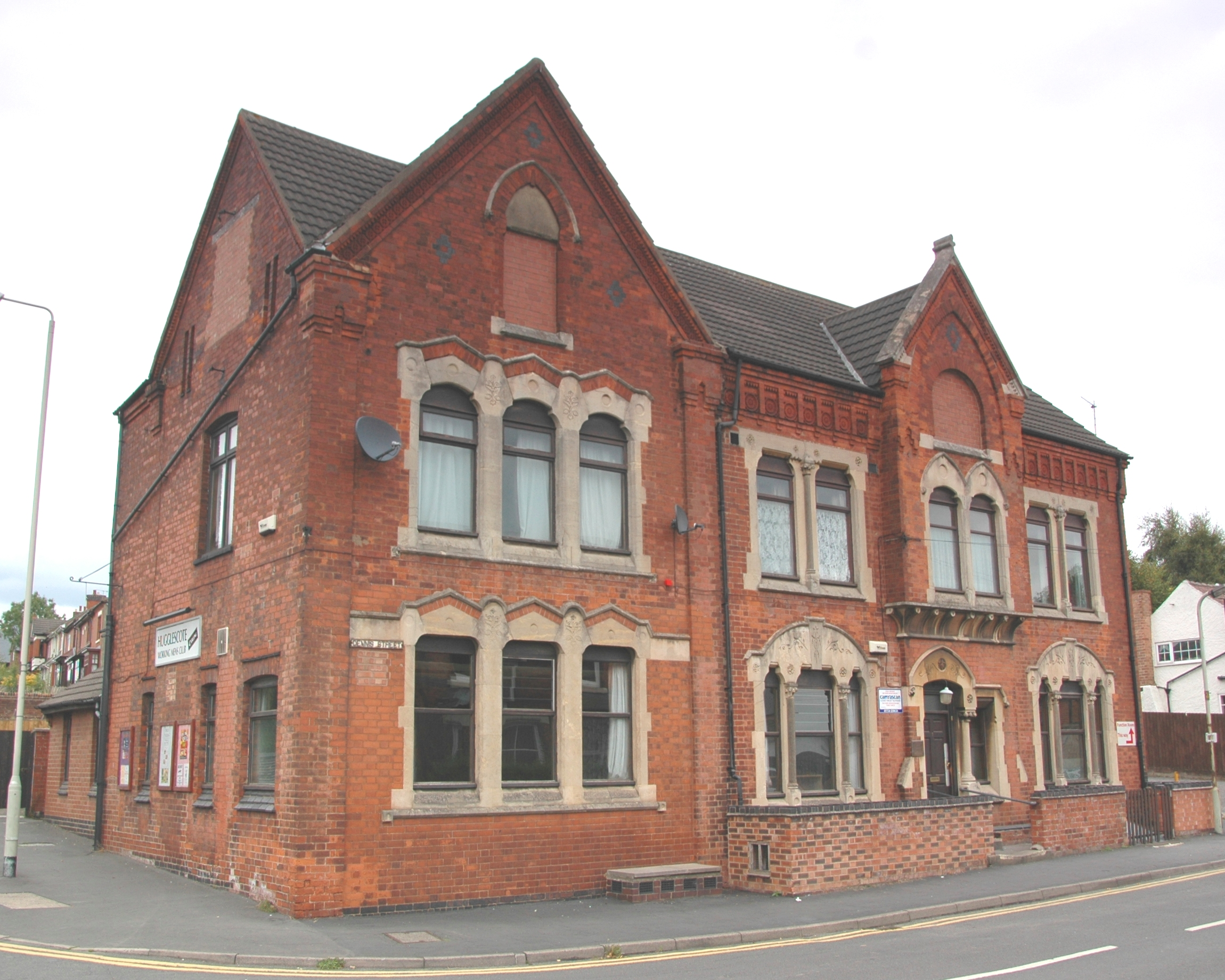
Hugglescote Social Club

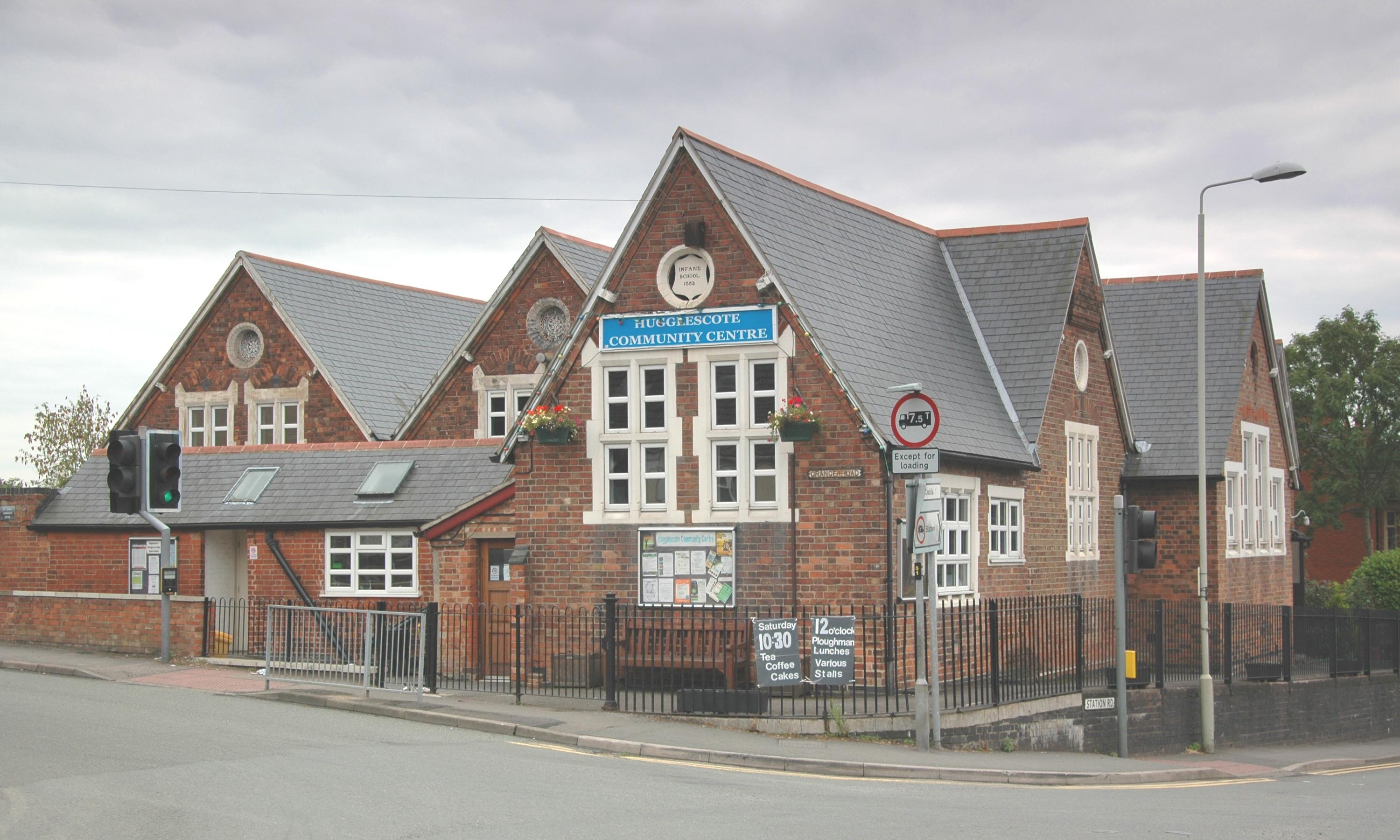
Former National School, now Hugglescote Community Centre

Hugglescote now has a Community Primary School. The buildings of its former National School (see above) are now a community centre.

The village has one public house:, The Gate Inn. It has also a working men's club.

Roberts Travel Group are based on Midland Road within the village and provide the local bus service connecting the village with Coalville and Hinckley.

== Sources ==
- Lewis, Samuel, ed. (1931) [1848]. A Topographical Dictionary of England (Seventh ed.). London: Samuel Lewis. pp. 69–78.
- Pevsner, Nikolaus (1960). Leicestershire and Rutland. The Buildings of England. Harmondsworth: Penguin Books. pp. 123–124.

== Gallery ==
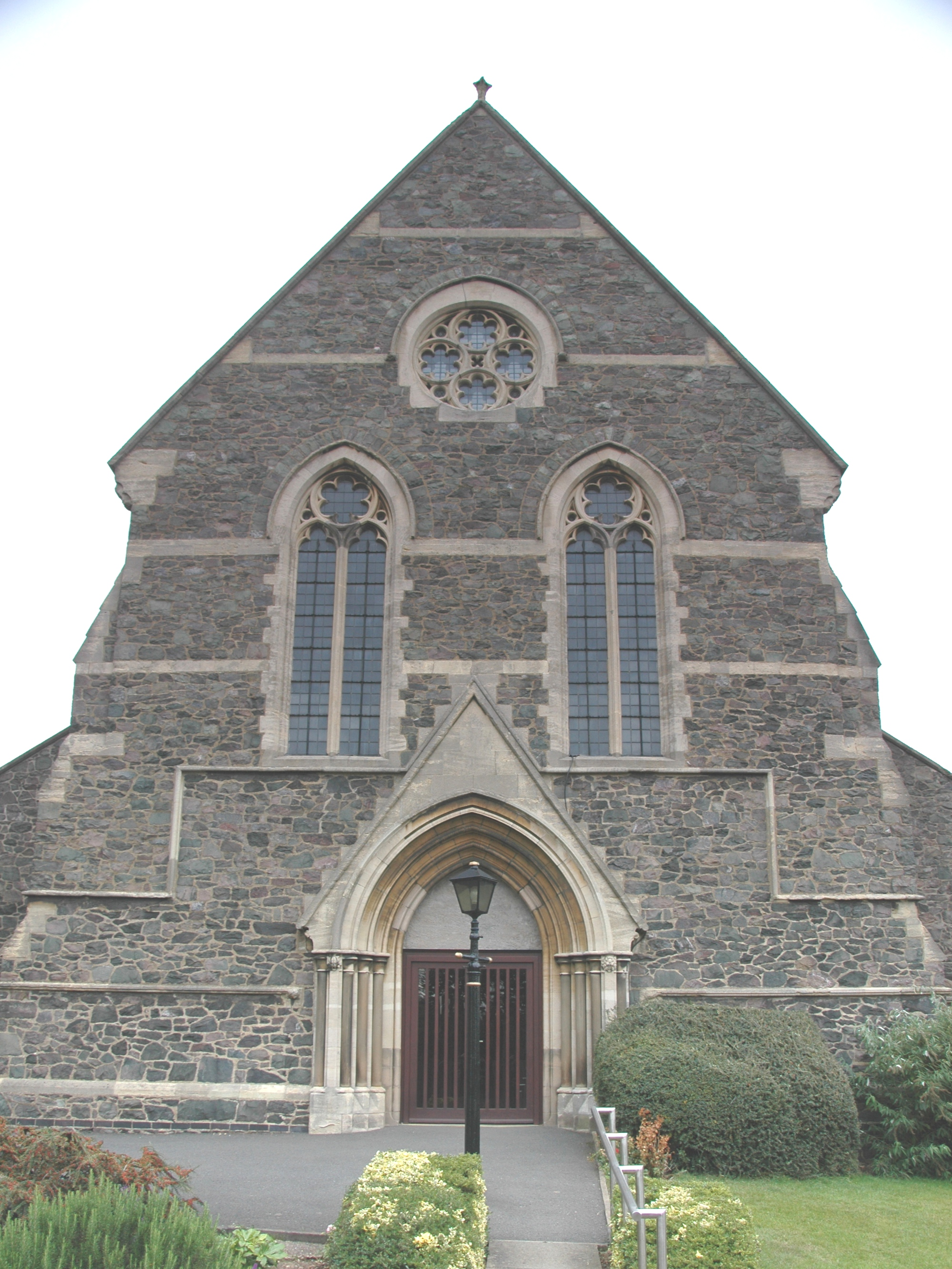
West front of St. John the Baptist parish church

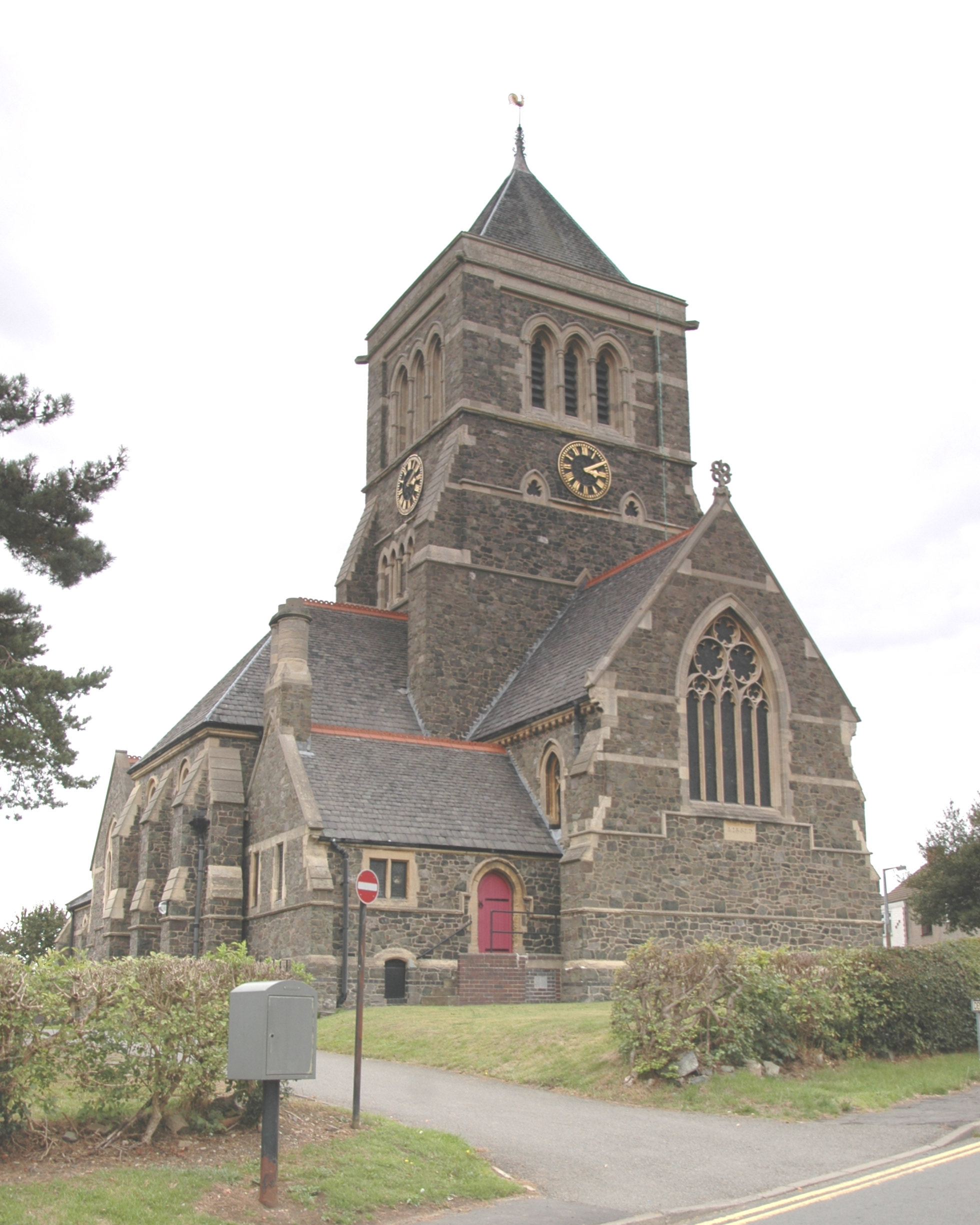
St. John the Baptist parish church from the southeast

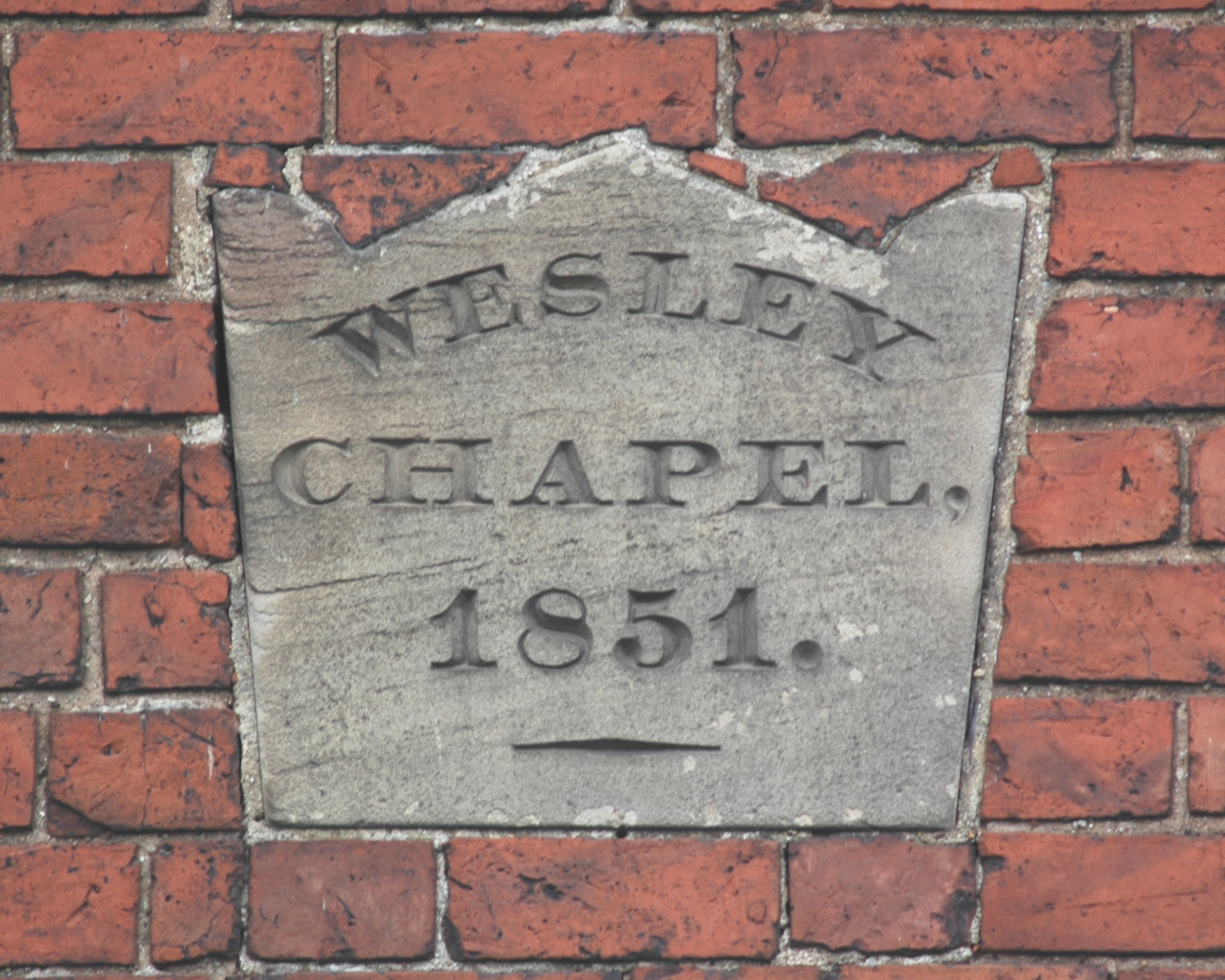
1851 completion stone on Hugglescote Methodist church

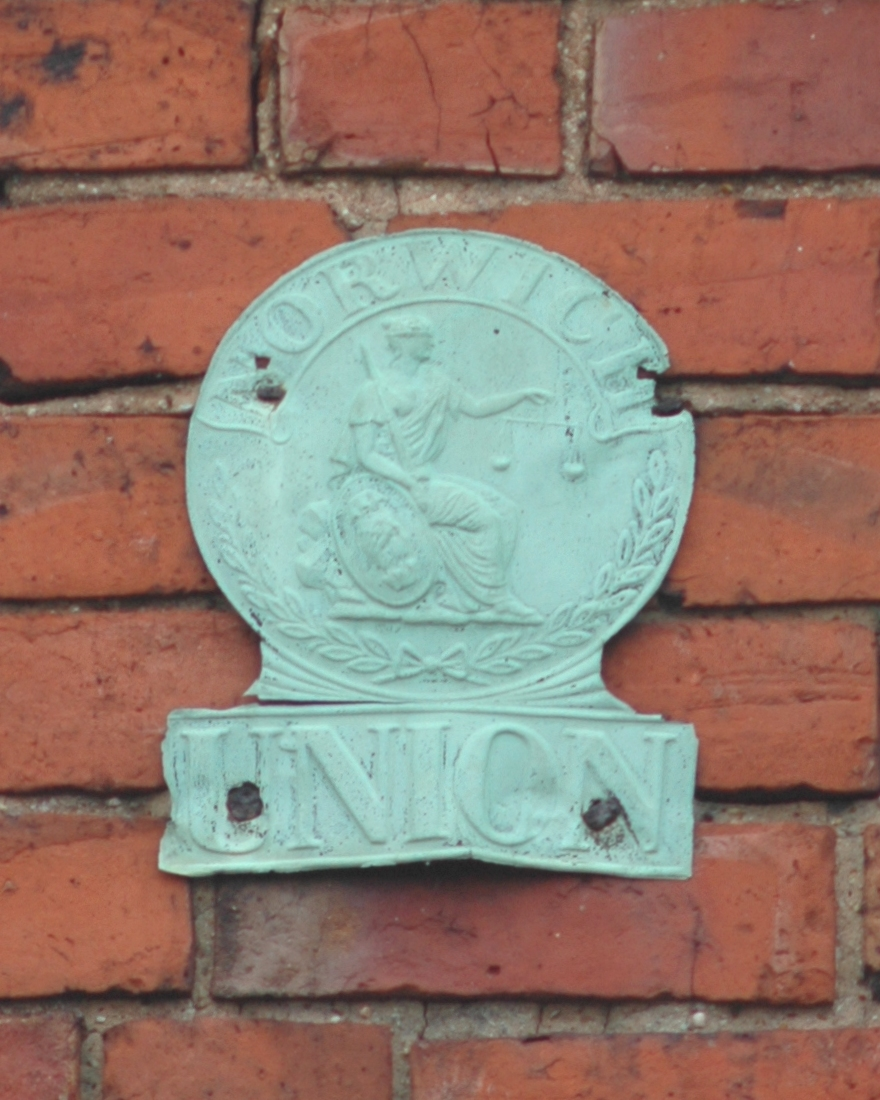
Norwich Union fire insurance mark on Hugglescote Methodist church
