= Whitwick =

Village in Leicestershire, England

Coordinates: 52°44′25″N 1°21′20″W

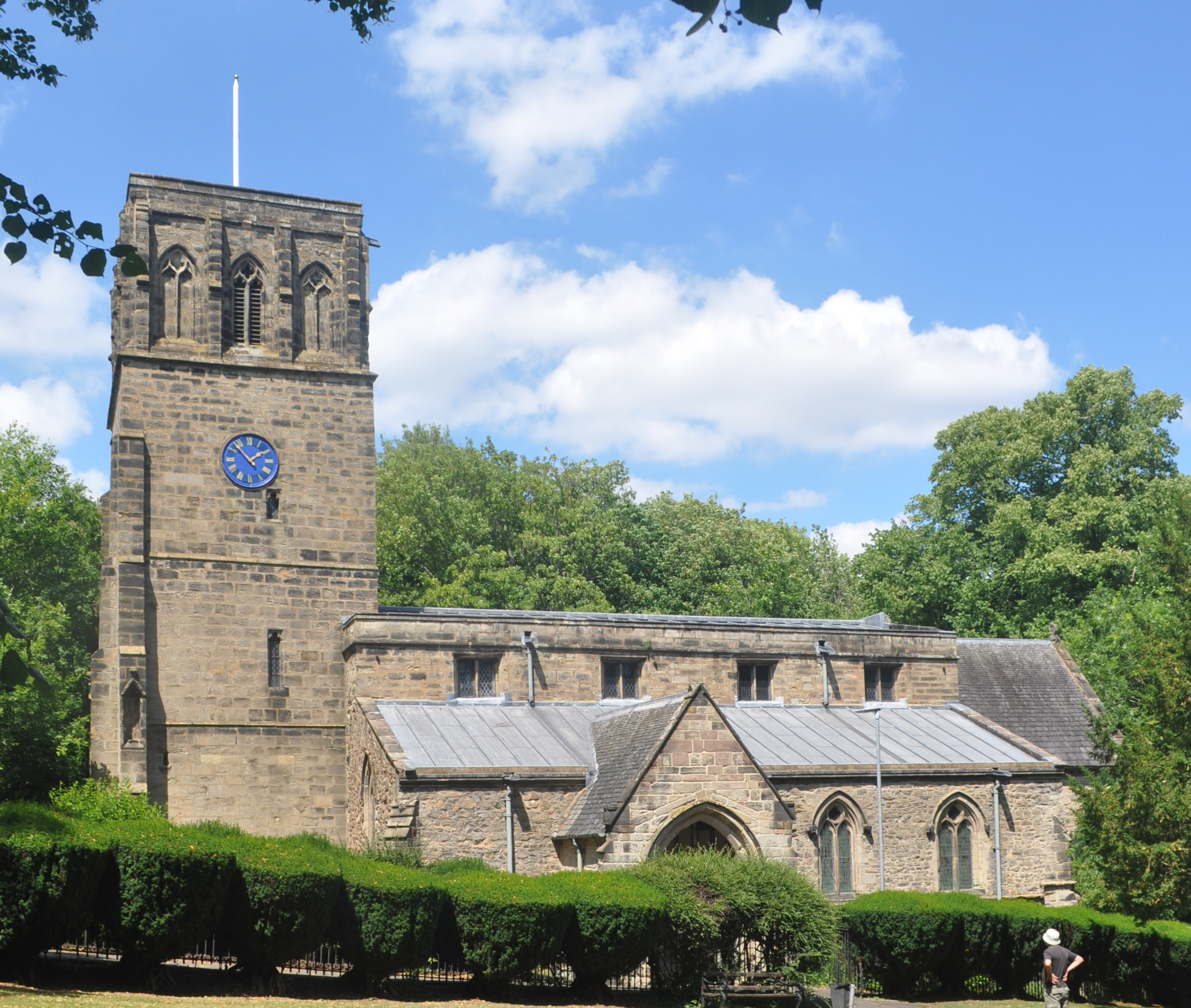
- Whitwick Parish Church

- Location within Leicestershire
- Population: 8,612 (2011 Census)
- Civil parish: Whitwick
- District: North West Leicestershire
- Shire county: Leicestershire
- Region: East Midlands
- Country: England
- Sovereign state: United Kingdom
- Post town: COALVILLE
- Postcode district: LE67
- Police: Leicestershire
- Fire: Leicestershire
- Ambulance: East Midlands
- UK Parliament: North West Leicestershire

Whitwick /ˈwɪtɪk/ is a large village and civil parish in the North West Leicestershire district of Leicestershire, England, some two miles north of Coalville in the northwest of the county. It lies in an ancient parish which formerly included the equally historic villages of Thringstone and Swannington. Whitwick is situated 4 miles southwest of Shepshed, 6 miles east of Ashby-de-la-Zouch and 8 miles west-southwest of Loughborough.

It was an important manor in the Middle Ages, which once included Bardon and Markfield, parts of Hugglescote, Donington le Heath, Ratby, Bocheston, Newtown Unthank and Whittington. As early as 1293, Whitwick had a weekly market and a four-day fair. The population of Whitwick, according to the 2001 census was 10,815 persons. 8,092 of these fell into the 16–74 working age range, although only 4,689 were employed. The population of the village at the 2011 census had fallen to 8,612.

== History ==
One of the earliest mentions of the place, as Witewic, is in the Domesday Book of 1086, the name of the settlement possibly meaning either guardhouse"The White Farm" or "Hwita's Farm" The last two appear to rely on later meanings for both particles Wite and Wik and may have been a reference to the outcrop of white sandstone found here. It was listed amongst the lands given to Hugh de Grandmesnil by King William I. There was said to be land for half a plough and woodland which was a furlong by half a furlong. Its value was two shillings.

=== Castle ===
Whitwick had a motte and bailey castle, although no remains are left. It was probably built originally during the spate of rapid castle building by William the Conqueror following the spate of rebellions leading up to the harrowing of the north. There appears to be evidence of a timber castle and later stone castle. The timber castle was more likely in place in the 11th century and to have been later held by 'Henricus de Bello Monte, Consanguineus Regis' (Henry Beaumont, blood-relative of the king). In 1320 he was granted a licence to crenellate the structure. The building work resulting from this licence may have provoked an attack by Sir John Talbot. Beaumont's claim to the land was from his wife's inheritance and, it seems, Talbot felt he had a claim to Whitwick. Twenty years later the capital message was worth nothing. This stone castle was later held by the Earls of Leicester, though it was recorded as being ruinous by 1427. The foundations are said to have been visible at the end of the 18th century and a wall was still to be seen on the north side in 1893.

The word 'gatehouse' is likely a corruption of 'guardhouse'. A gatehouse is usually an entrance to a walled city or a castle entrance. In the case of Whitwic Castle, the castle is in the centre of the town and thus there is no 'gatehouse'.

The mound retains the title of Castle Hill and is surmounted by a 19th-century folly, with a castellated roofline. This was built in 1846 by a local landowner, Joseph Almond Cropper, as almshouses for the poor.

=== Lead up to the Harrying of the North ===
Between the defeat of Harold in 1066 and the creation of the Domesday Book in 1086, William the Conqueror faced a number of rebellions which culminated in a "scorched earth" policy attack on the north of England destroying homes, food stores and farms. This attack resulted in the deaths of thousands by starvation and the elements. One such rebellion happened at Nottingham. Witewic Castle would appear to have been created in response to the threat from the north. There have been no signs of a pre-Norman occupation and it is known that the rapid creation of motte and bailey castles by William was in response to the rebellions. It is, therefore, possible that the town grew around the castle and not the other way around. The middle-English proves difficult however when considering the 1000AD meaning of Wite as Guard (c1000 Sax. Leechd. III. 154 Þæt bið god swefen, wite þu þæt georne on þinre heortan.) and Wic from roughly the same period meaning 'dwelling' (c1175 Ormulum (Burchfield transcript) l. 8512 Iosæp..bærenn ure laferrd crist..Fra land to land. fra tun to tun. Fra wic to wic i tune.) It would appear that the castle was a "guard-house" and the town that sprouted up around it took its name.

=== Market and fair ===
From 1838 until the early 20th century, there was a thriving weekly market held in Whitwick Market Place. As well as the regular local stallholders a number of Leicester tradesmen attended and it is remembered that old ladies used to bring their butter and other farm produce and line up alongside the gutter. In the years following the First World War, competition from the larger and newer market at Coalville eventually resulted in its discontinuance.

The annual fair, or wakes, was once a hugely popular event and coincided with the patronal festival of the parish church. At the height of its popularity in the early 20th century, it is remembered that the larger amusements stood in the opening in front of the White Horse public house and there were wild beast shows including seals swimming around in tanks. The local photographer would take snapshots (on glass) and deliver them while the customers waited. There was also once a 'Cabbage Street Wakes', of rather obscure origin, when cabbages were used to decorate the lampposts in Cademan Street.

=== Curious place names in Whitwick ===
A popular affirmation is that the village of Whitwick contains three 'cities'. The City of Three Waters and the City of Dan are official postal addresses, situated respectively at the foot of Dumps Hill and Leicester Road. Over the years, there have been many contenders for the location of the 'third city', the most popular being The City of Hockley – an area located midway between the cities of Three Waters and Dan, close to the parish church, and alongside the watercourse passing through the village. However, older residents have always maintained that this area was known simply as The Hockley, the prefix 'city', they suggest, being a retrospective appendage. Even the place-name 'Hockley' would appear to be a mystery. (The nearby South Derbyshire village of Woodville has an old lane signposted as, simply, 'The City').

Equally obscure is the origin of the name 'Dumps Hill', a steep incline forming part of a staggered cross-roads at the northern end of the village. Many theories have been expounded to account for its origin, one being that the houses built on the righthand side after the old railway bridge were constructed on the site of the old 'Dumblies' pig farm. Sheila Smith, in her 1984 history of Whitwick suggests that the name may be linked to framework knitting as in 1845 one Joseph Sheffield, giving evidence before the Commission into the plight of the framework knitters, makes reference to a type of stocking called 'dumps'. There are several surviving examples of framework knitters' cottages in the village, which can be recognised by elongated first storey windows, designed to allow greater inlet of light. A good example of such a cottage can be found at the foot of the Dumps.

== Past industry and commerce ==
=== Framework knitting ===
During the 18th century, framework knitting became an important cottage industry in the village, taking over from agriculture. As early as 1723/24, William Clark, son of William, was apprenticed to Joseph Howe. This apprenticeship was to run from Michaelmas 1723/24 for seven years. By the beginning of the 19th century, Leicestershire, Nottinghamshire and Derbyshire had become the centre of the British hosiery trade, taking over from London. In 1832, it is recorded that there were some 33,000 knitting frames in use in the Midlands, of which the majority – 11,200, were in Leicestershire.

In 1844, there were 423 knitting frames in Whitwick and by this time, the cottage industry had been in decline for some years. This appears to have been as a result of a change in fashions and also to the new type of hose being produced, which required fewer skills in the manufacture. From the middle of the 19th century, framework knitting began to be transferred from homes to the factories in larger towns. By 1851, it is recorded that the number of frames in Whitwick had dwindled to 240.

Large hosiery factories appeared on Church Lane and at the top of The Dumps, shortly before the First World War.

=== Mineral water factories ===
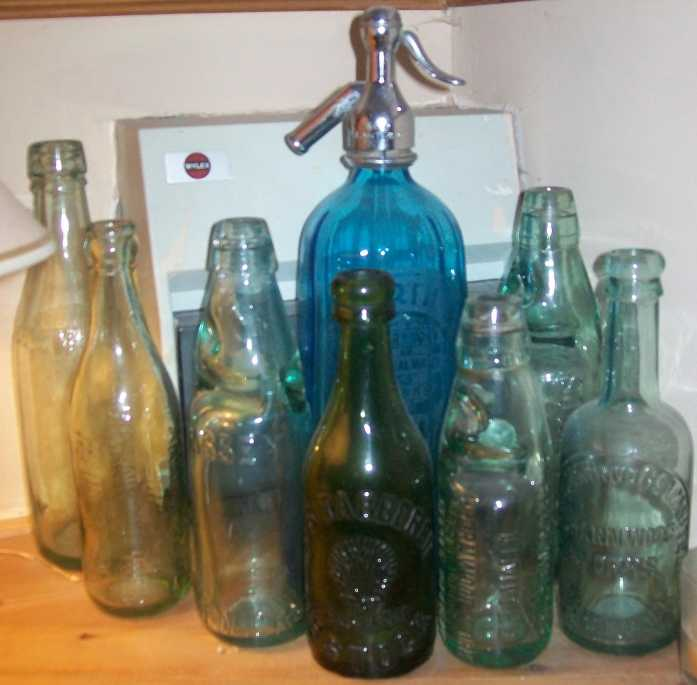
Collection of late 19th- and early 20th-century Whitwick bottles

In addition to the usual village trades, Whitwick also once had three mineral water factories.

The largest of these was the firm of Bernard Beckworth on Cademan Street, which was established in 1875 and ran until the 1970s; it is listed in Kelly's Directories of Leicestershire from 1904 through to 1941 as 'Beckworth and Co. Ltd, Charnwood Mineral Water Works'.

By 1904, the firm of Stinson Brothers, based on Loughborough Road, had appeared. By 1912, this firm is listed as simply Horace Stinson and it had disappeared from the Whitwick Directories by 1928.

The firm of Richard Massey appears from 1916, listed at 36, Castle Street, Whitwick. Massey's has disappeared by 1941.

A Stinson Bros codd bottle appeared among lots listed for auction in Barnsley (BBR Auctions) on Saturday 8 January 2006. It was described as a 9 inch tall emerald green glass codd bottle, embossed, 'STINSON BROS/WHITWICK.' The guide price was £80 – £100, the relatively high estimate presumably reflecting the rarity of the glass, but the bottle was in fact sold for £515. The bottle was turned up by a plough in a field opposite A.W.Waldrum's Coal Merchant's premises on Grace Dieu Road, Whitwick and is the only known example.

There is also known to have existed a 'Botanical Brewery', though it is believed that this may have been a part of the Stinson or Massey enterprises, both of which later moved to Hermitage Road. Both firms are listed on Hermitage Road (under Coalville) in a trade directory of 1941. There are also known to have been examples of 19th-century bottles bearing the name of McCarthy and Beckworth, Coalville.

=== Coal mining ===
Whitwick Colliery is remembered for an underground fire in 1898 that killed 35 miners in Leicestershire's worst mining tragedy.

=== Railway ===
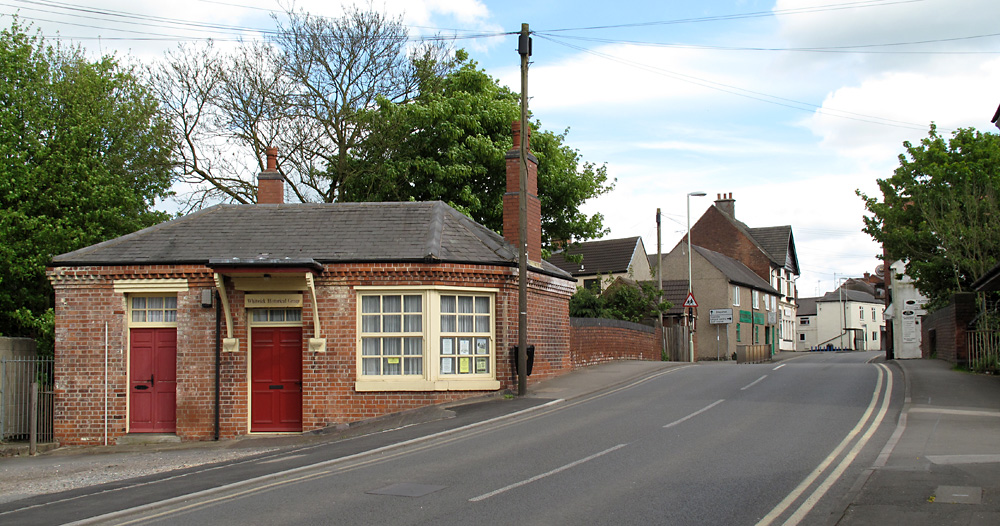
Whitwick station at road level.

Whitwick railway station was on the Charnwood Forest Railway which was constructed by the Charnwood Forest Company between 1881 and 1883. This branch line ran from Coalville East (joined to the Ashby & Nuneaton Joint Railway (ANJR)) to the town of Loughborough, at the Derby Road Station. Passenger services ceased to operate on 13 April 1931, with freight services ceasing to operate on 12 December 1963. Whitwick railway station still has some surviving structures, the platform and the old station building, now the home of the Whitwick Historical Group, while the railway trackbed towards Coalville has been turned into a footpath.

== Religion ==
=== St. John the Baptist Parish Church ===
The parish church of St. John the Baptist is an ancient structure, nestling in a natural amphitheatre, close to the confluence of two streams. A spring, emanating from under the chancel, is also discharged into the watercourse, through a piped outlet protruding from a stone wall at the east end of the churchyard. This spring is said to have been used during the 19th century as means of powering the bellows of the church organ. It is possible that this site was regarded as sacred in pre-Christian times, thereby influencing the choice of location for the church. It was also conjectured by the local historian, George Green of Loughborough, that a fragment of pre-Norman cross shaft would appear to be incorporated into the chancel wall, supporting the idea that a church may well have existed on this site in Anglo-Saxon times. However, there is no mention of a priest or church connected with Whitwick in the Domesday Book of 1086, and in the absence of conclusive structural evidence beyond the thirteenth century, it is perhaps more likely that the church was built as a later adjunct to the nearby castle. The church we see today is mainly of 14th-century construction, with only the south doorway seeming to go back to the 13th century. The massive decorated western tower contains a peal of eight bells, four of which were cast in 1628, and in the north aisle can be found the mutilated alabaster effigy of a knight, which tradition has to be that of Sir John Talbot, who died in 1365. Talbot is said to have been a giant, and this accounts for the exceptional length of the monument.

The church was a victim of aggressive restoration during the 19th century, when the chancel was rebuilt by James Piers St Aubyn, 1848–1849. A vaulted substructure or crypt is situated beneath the chancel, but is not thought to have ever been used as a charnel house. The building of this understructure would have been necessary to maintain a level between the chancel and the nave due to the steepness of sloping ground at the east end.

In the south exterior wall of the nave, close by the porch, there is a canopied recess, which according to tradition once contained a doorway leading to vaults beneath the south aisle. It is likely that this recess would once have contained a founder's tomb.

From 1319 until its dissolution in 1536, Whitwick Church was an endowment of the Benedictine chapter of Up Holland Priory, near Wigan, Lancashire. Following royal sequestration, the patronage of the living passed to the King and Whitwick Church remains one of forty-two churches nationally which are in the patronage of the Monarch (in the rights of the Duchy of Lancaster).

Today, the church forms part of a united benefice with Thringstone and Swannington. The registers date from 1601.

The churchyard was closed for burials many years ago. In more recent years, many of the 18th- and 19th-century slate headstones were uprooted and moved in a line around the periphery of the southern portion of the graveyard; a 20th-century concrete war memorial now occupies the centre. Other stones were taken up and used for paving around the church.

Whitwick Cemetery, off Church Lane, was consecrated on 24 June 1874 and consists of about four acres. It was divided into three sections: Church of England, Catholic and Nonconformist and placed under the control of a joint burial committee. It contains four Commonwealth war graves of service personnel, one from World War I and three from World War II.

=== Vicars of Whitwick 1551—2020 ===
Vicar	From	Until	Notes
Peter Fynche, MA	---	1551	Also Rector of Ravenstone, 1549 – 59.
George Halsted	1551	1553	
Robert Grace	1553	1576	
Henry Lynney	1576	1578	Vicar of St Martin's, Leicester 1578 – 1585.
Thomas Hunt	1578	1595	
--- Barlowe	---	---	Recorded as Vicar in 1601
Michael Crosley	1612	1642	
John Bennet	–	1662	Ejected 1662. Licensed as a Nonconformist 1672 at Littleover
John Brentnall, BA	1675	1691	Vicar of Elvaston cum Thurlston and Ambaston, 1691 – 1695; Vicar of Lockington 1695 – 1703.
William Hunt, MA	1691	1700	Rector of Coleorton, 1700 – 1727.
William Ramser, BA	1700	1705	
John Hagger, BA	1705	1711	Vicar of Cropwell Bishop, 1711 – 1735.
William Banks, BA	1711	1715	
Charles Clarke, BA	1715	1736	
Charles Franke, MA	1736	1767	
Francis Harris, BA	1767	1819	Longest serving Vicar of Whitwick – 51 years, 6 months
Francis Merewether, MA	1819	1864	Also Rector of Coleorton, 1815 – 1864. Founded churches at Coalville, Swannington and Thringstone
Samuel Smith, DD	1864	1875	Changed surname to Pyemont in 1869.
Augustus Francis Tollemache, MA	1875	1894	
James Wilson Alexander Mackenzie, MA	1894	1913	
Thomas W. Walters, MA, RD	1913	1937	
Fredrick G. Hogarth, MA, RD	1937	1970	
Ralph E. Wheaton, Dip. Theology	1971	1981	Rural Dean 1979–1981
Peter S. Lawrie	1981	1996	
Deryck I. Charnock, Dip.HE Theology, ONC Business	1998	2006	
John Seaman, BA	2008	2012	
Alan Burgess	2012	2015	
Liz Angell, BA (Hons)	2016	2020	First Woman Vicar of Whitwick

=== Daughter churches and national school ===
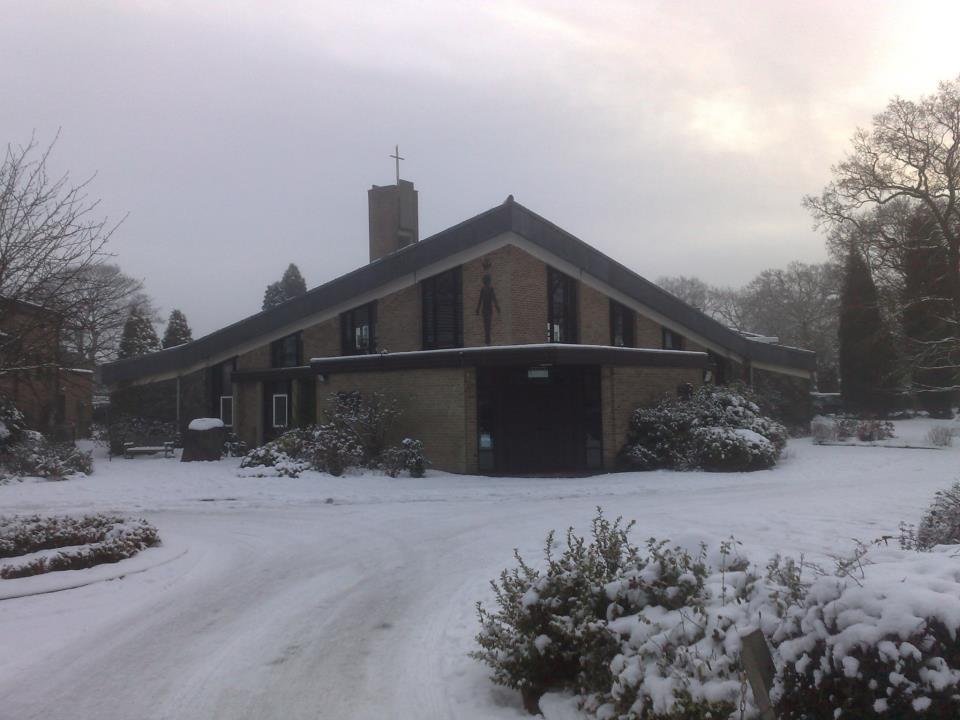
Saint David's Church, Broom Leys – a daughter church of Whitwick

In the 19th and 20th centuries, new churches were built within the vast, ancient ecclesiastical parish of Whitwick as a result of population growth, all of which later came to serve independent parishes in their own right. Possibly more by coincidence than design, these daughter churches are dedicated respectively to the patron saints of Great Britain: St George's, Swannington was built in 1825; St Andrew's, Thringstone was built in 1862 and St David's, Broom Leys was founded in 1933. Christ Church, Coalville, was also formed partially out of Whitwick Parish in 1836, though the church here stands on land which was originally in the ancient parish of Ibstock, within the chapelry of Hugglescote.

The churches at Swannington, Coalville and Thringstone all owe their existence to the zealous missionary drive of the Reverend Francis Merewether MA (1784–1864), Vicar of Whitwick for more than fifty years, and also Rector of Coleorton. Merewether, a low church theologian who preached and wrote prolifically against Roman Catholicism, was also successful in getting national schools established in these outlying parts of the parish as well as in Whitwick itself. He left behind him a small empire of Anglican expansion, wrought in part by a desire to counteract the 'papist' revival that he perceived to be sweeping the district, at the instigation of Ambrose de Lisle of Grace Dieu Manor. Whitwick National School, a stone building in the Early English style still stands in the market place, now a Grade Two listed building. An extension to the school was provided in 1903, with access on silver street. The school was replaced later in the 20th century by a new Church of England school located at the foot of Parsonwood Hill. The old school is now used as a day nursery.

St David's, Broom Leys was for more than thirty years served by a small wooden church which had originally served as a chapel at the Mowsley Sanitorium near Market Harborough, Leicestershire and was brought over to its present site in sections and duly re-erected. This small structure still stands near the present day 'futuristic' church, work on which was commenced in 1964. The foundation stone (a piece of Welsh slate from St David's in West Wales and presented by the dean of that cathedral) was laid on 26 September 1964 in the presence of about five hundred people. Above the front entrance of the church is the figure of St David, cast in 'ciment fondu' and coated with a bronze resin. The bricks are a 'Blaby Grey' and the stonework was provided by the local Whitwick Quarry.

=== Other places of worship ===
==== Methodist and Baptist ====
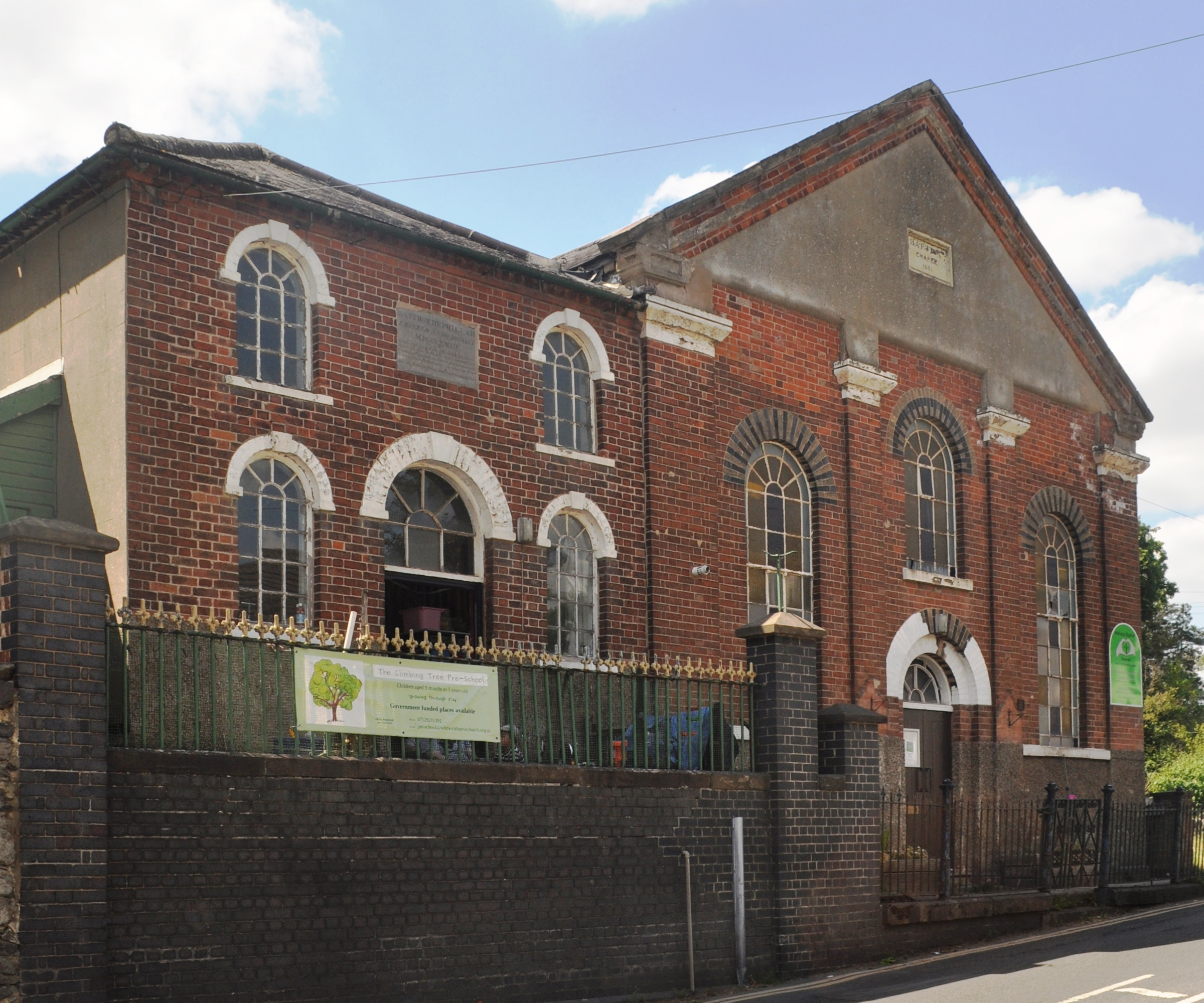
Whitwick Baptist Church

Until the early 19th century, the parish church remained the only place of worship in the village. Then, in the 1820s, the Baptists erected a small chapel on Pares Hill and a society of Wesleyan Methodists opened a chapel on North Street (extended 1879). From its foundation in 1823 until 1855, Whitwick Baptist Church remained a branch of the Hugglescote Church. In 1855, both the Whitwick and Coalville Baptist churches separated from Hugglescote and both churches were held under the pastorate of the Revd John Cholerton. A new Baptist church was built at Whitwick in 1861 at a cost of £318.10.0 by William Beckworth, a local builder, alongside the original chapel. By 1890, the minister was the Revd J. J. Berry. It is recorded that for his payment, he accepted the seat rents and weekly collections.

A Primitive Methodist chapel appeared at the foot of Leicester Road (the present day Vicarage Street) in 1864 and a Wesleyan Methodist chapel was built on North Street in 1822 and which was extended in 1879. Wesleyan Reform Methodists also opened a chapel on North Street toward the end of the 19th century, and also in New Swannington in 1906. The Reform Chapel on North Street was used as a warehouse by 'Gracedieu Windows' until its demolition early in the twenty-first century, when the site was used for building development. The Wesleyan and Primitive Methodists united nationally in 1932 and the two societies in Whitwick finally merged in 1965, after which time the Vicarage Street chapel was used by the amalgamated congregations, the North Street chapel eventually being sold to the Church of England for use as a parish hall in about 1966. In 1972, a new Methodist church was built at the foot of Hall Lane and the Vicarage Street chapel (an example of 19th-century non-conformist architecture in the village) was demolished circa 1980, having fallen into a state of disrepair. The site is now occupied by a car park. Due to extensive housing development during the 1960s, a Methodist church was also built at the other end of Hall Lane in 1966, close to the Broom Leys cross-roads. It is noticeable that in more recent years, structural alterations have been carried out to this building to replace the original flat roof with a pitched one.

==== Roman Catholic ====
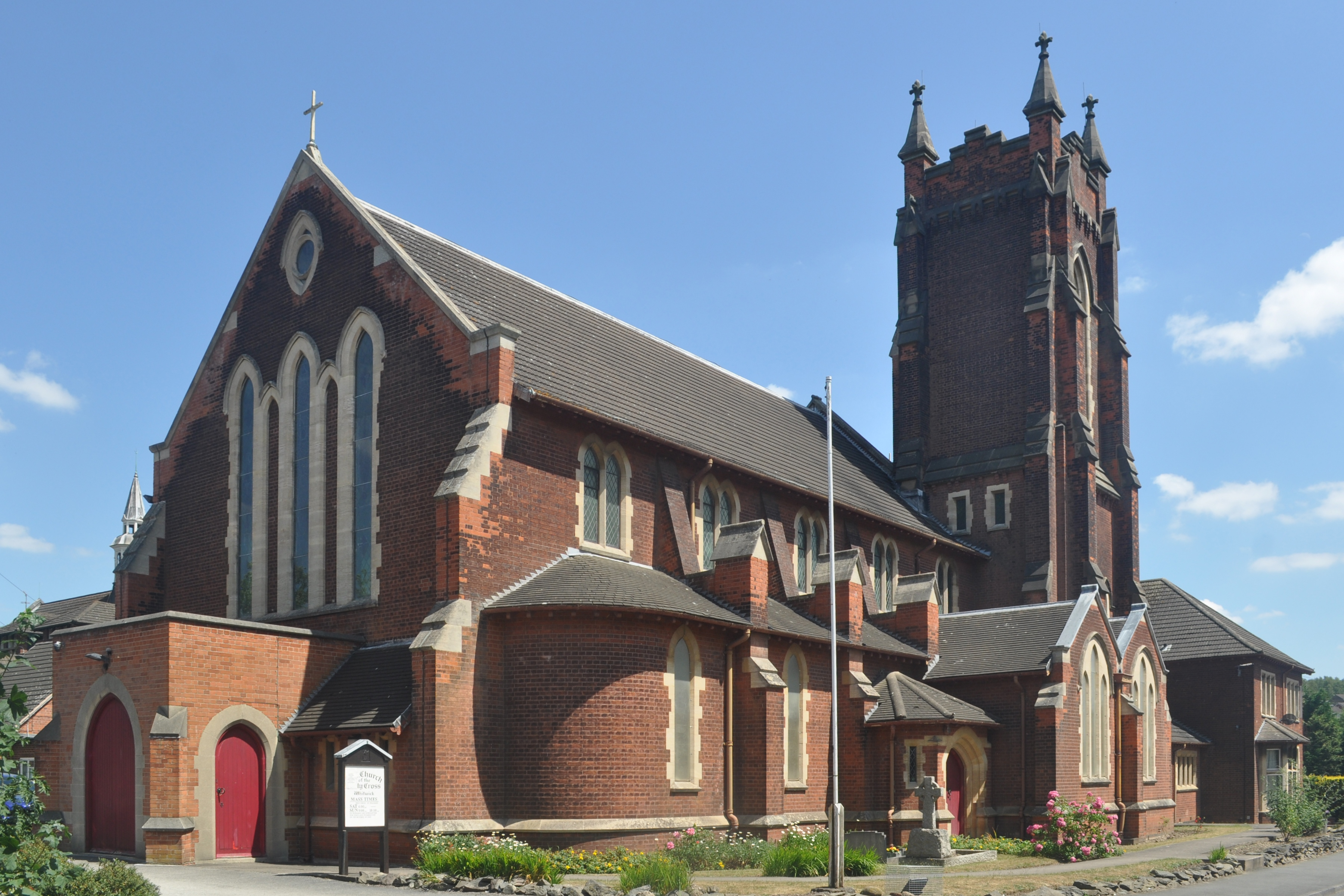
Holy Cross Church

Due to the residency at Grace Dieu Manor of a zealous and wealthy convert to Roman Catholicism, Ambrose de Lisle, Whitwick became an important centre of the Roman Catholic revival.

It was due to De Lisle that a Cistercian monastery, Mount St. Bernard Abbey, was established within the parish in 1835, and a church (designed by Pugin) was built on Parsonwood Hill in 1837. In 1875, a small convent of Rosminian nuns was established in the presbytery, which had been built adjacent to the original church in August 1848, and which transferred to Loughborough in the twentieth century. The presbytery, still referred to as 'The Old Convent' is now a private residence and was designated a Grade II listed building in 1983.

In establishing his mission, De Lisle recruited a charismatic priest, Aloysius Gentili, from Rome, who arrived at Gracedieu in June 1840 and by May of the following year, De Lisle claimed that some five hundred and twenty persons had become converted to the catholic faith as a result of Gentilli's outreach.

The present Roman Catholic Church was built in 1904 from the designs of Thomas Ignatius McCarthy. This was built on the opposite side of Parsonwood Hill, at which time Pugin's church was demolished, though the cemetery of the old church remains. A school was also built to the rear of the new church to replace the original school at Turylog (Thurlough), which had been opened in 1843. A tower was added to the new church in about 1910, from funds bequeathed by Samuel Wilson Hallam, landlord of the Queen's Head, Thringstone. The tower contains a chime of fifteen bells operated by a baton keyboard, located in the first storey chamber of the tower and which was installed by Taylors of Loughborough in 1960.

==== Roman Catholic Priests of Whitwick ====
Dates of Office	Name of Incumbent
1837–40	Father Odilo Woolfrey (Mount St Barnard Abbey)
1840–44	Father S Whitaker
1844–45	Served from Mount St Bernard Abbey
1845–48	Oblates of Mary Immaculate
1848–49	Father F Signini (Institute of Charity)
1849–50	Served from Mount St Bernard Abbey
1850–52	Father N Lorraine (Institute of Charity)
1852–59	Served from Mount St Bernard Abbey
1859–65	Father G Bent
1865–95	Father A Van Paemal
1895–98	Father J Jackson
1899–1934	Canon M J O'Reilly
1934–56	Mgr Canon H A Hunt
1956–79	Mgr Canon A Bird
1979–84	Father P J Neary
1984–90	Father T J Godley
1990–2001	Father M J Bell
2001–22	Father J Cahill
2022 – Present	Father Gabriel Offor

== Local public houses ==
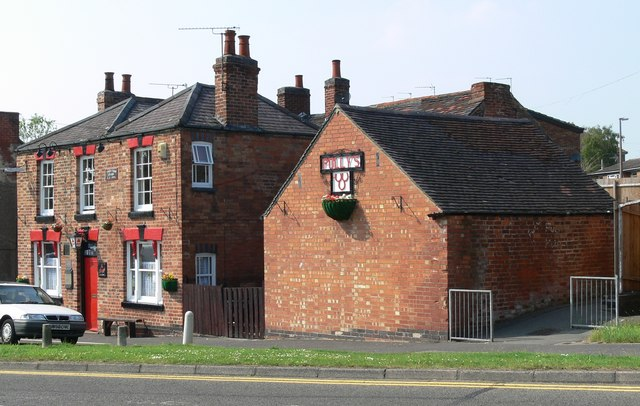
The Three Horseshoes

In Whitwick there has been, at one time or another, thirty-nine licensed establishments, either an Inn, Public House, Hostelry or Social Club. Most have now closed and even been demolished. Below is an itemised list of the establishments:

Premises	Status	Location	Opened	Closed	Notes
The Abbey Inn	Demolished	Cademen Street		1911	Now the site of grass and a bench.
The Beaumont Arms "Uncle Toms Cabin" Whitwick Working Mens Club & Institute (1920); Whitwick Snooker & Social Club	Closed	Market Place	1830	2009	Demolished & replaced by a Coop Village shop
The Black Horse	Trading	Church Lane		No	
The Blacksmiths Arms	Demolished	Hall Lane, Barn End Corner		1908	Now grass and path.
The Boot Inn	Converted	Silver Street	1836	1913	Converted to a take-away; The Whitty Fish then Whitwick Spice now Doner Master Kebab Takeaway.
The Bulls Head	Trading	Warren Hills Road, Abbots Oak		No	
The Castle Inn "Patsy Griffin's"	Converted	Castle Street		1970	Converted to private residence
The Cricketers Arms	Demolished	Leicester Road		1908	Now No.18
The Crown and Cushion "Thripneys'"	Converted	Silver Street		2002	Converted to private residence
The Crown and Cushion	Demolished	South Street	1836	1923	demolished c. 1970, now private drives. One of the last landlords of the establishment was Aston Villa F.C. footballer, Michael Noon, who played for the team 1899–1906.
The Duke of Newcastle	Demolished	North Street		c1985	Now Pare's Close.
The Duke of York	Demolished	Leicester Road		1929	Now a retirement home next to the fish shop.
The Forest Rock Hotel	Converted	Leicester Road			One of the oldest hostelries in the area and had its own cricket team Whitwick Forest Rock. Converted into the Forest Rock Offices
The Foresters Arms	Closed	Leicester Road		2009	Converted to private residence
The Hare and Hounds "Mary's House"	Trading	City of Three Waters		No	
The Hastings Arms	Demolished	Market Place		1961	Now the site of a Carpet Shop
The Hermitage Inn	Converted	Hermitage Road		1905	Converted to private residence
The Hermitage Hotel	Demolished	Hermitage Road	1905	1967	Demolished due to subsidence, now No.107.
The Jolly Colliers	Closed	Thornborough Road, Thornborough		Yes	Currently a hand car wash site
The Kings Arms "Mother Goose's"	Trading	Silver Street		No	Closed during 2023 and re-opened Summer 2024
The Lady Jane	Trading	Hall Lane		No	The newest built pub in the area.
The Liberal Club North Street Working Mens Club	Closed	North Street	1888	2023	Converted into flats
The Man Within Compass "Rag and Mop"	Trading	Loughborough Road		No	
The Marquis of Granby	Demolished	Cademan Street			Now the entrance of King Richards Hill. A popular name in the area at the time as a tribute to General John Manners, whom favoured some soldiers and rewarded them with funds to invest into inns upon their retirement.
The New Inn "Tommy Potter's"	Demolished	Brooks Lane		1934	Demolished in 1934 for road clearance at the junction.
The Oak of Whitwick (1998) The Beavers Lodge "The Pink Pig" (1983 )	Closed	Talbot Street		Now planned to be demolished & replaced by housing	The replacement of the original Prince of Wales.
The Prince of Wales	Demolished	Talbot Street			The building was demolished and rebuilt further away from the roadside.
The Queens Head	Demolished	Thornborough Road			
The Joiners Arms The Railway Hotel (1882)	Converted	South Street		1965	The Railway Hotel was built on top of the Joiners arms, literally. The original building forms the basement level for the structure, which was increased when the road level was raised for the construction of the Charnwood Forest Railway. Now an estate agents.
The Royal George	Demolished	North Street		1913	Now a grassy area.
The Talbot Arms	Converted	Talbot Street		1931	Converted to private residence
The Three Crowns Inn The Three Crowns Hotel (1881)	Closed	Market Place		No	Converted to flats and a retail unit/bar but as Nov 25 retail/bar unit not let.
The Three Horseshoes "Polly Burtons"	Trading	Leicester Road		No	Grade II listed building, CAMRA listed.
The Victoria Hotel "Vic Bikers Pub"	Trading	Whitwick Road		No	
The Wagon and Horses	Demolished	Church Lane		1985	Demolished in 1985 for road clearance, this pub was actually adjoined to The Black Horse.
The White Hart	Converted	Dumps Lane			Converted to private residence
The White Horse	Trading	Market Place		No	Originally a farm house. Footballer Frank Middleton, Landlord from 1916 to 1928, had played for Derby County F.C (1901–1906) and Leicester Fosse (1906–1909).
Whitwick & Thringstone Conservative Club Whitwick Constitutional Club (1925)	Trading	Silver Street	1897	No	Originally a private residence.

== Local government ==
In the 2007 North West Leicestershire District Council elections, the British National Party won both Hugglescote and Whitwick – the first seats to be won by the BNP in Leicestershire and Whitwick gained its first Conservative councillor. As of October 2024 the Councillors for Whitwick are currently Peter Moult (Labour); Tony Gillard (Conservative) and Anthony Barker(Labour).

It is represented at the county level by Councillor Joseph Boam, who was elected to Leicestershire County Council for the Whitwick division in 2025 as a member of Reform UK.

Following a campaign by local people, the District Council carried out a community governance review and made an Order on 12 May 2010 to set up the new Parish Council. Whitwick Parish Council held its Inaugural Meeting on 18 May 2011.

== Mount St Bernard and Gracedieu ==
Mount St. Bernard Abbey, a Cistercian monastery was established in 1835 in the parish of Whitwick on the Charnwood Forest. The current monastery was designed by the famous architect Augustus Welby Northmore Pugin, best known for his work on the Houses of Parliament.

In 1840, a hoard of two thousand Roman coins was discovered during ploughing operations at the monastery.

Gracedieu Vineyard is south facing and was established in 1995 in Charnwood Forest. Its 'Green Man' wine is based on the Madeleine Angevine grape.

== Notable residents ==
- Thomas Elsdon Ashford – Recipient of the Victoria Cross.
- Anne Macnaghten (1908-2000), classical violinist and teacher, born in Whitwick

== Freedom of the Parish ==
The following people and military units have received the Freedom of the Parish of Whitwick.

=== Individuals ===
- Sandy Flamson: 14 February 2023.
