= Donnington =

Donnington may refer to:

- Donnington, Berkshire
  - Donnington Castle
- Donnington, Gloucestershire
- Donnington, Herefordshire
- Donnington, Oxfordshire, a suburb of Oxford
  - Donnington Bridge, a bridge over the River Thames
- Donnington, Wroxeter and Uppington, Shropshire
- Donnington, Telford, Shropshire
- Donnington, West Sussex
  - Donnington (Chichester) (UK electoral ward)

== See also ==
- Donington (disambiguation)
