= Snibston =

Coordinates: 52°43′33.22″N 1°22′59.79″W

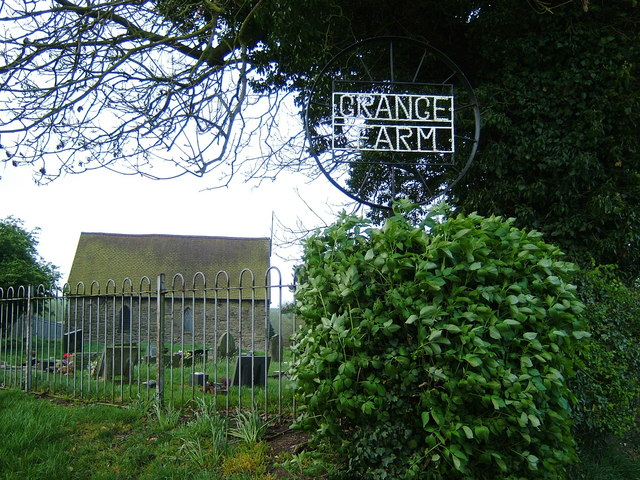
- St Mary's Church, Snibston, in Hugglescote and Donington le Heath civil parish

- Location within Leicestershire
- Civil parish: Ravenstone with Snibstone
- District: North West Leicestershire
- Shire county: Leicestershire
- Region: East Midlands
- Country: England
- Sovereign state: United Kingdom
- Post town: COALVILLE
- Postcode district: LE67
- Dialling code: 01530
- UK Parliament: North West Leicestershire

Snibston is an area and former civil parish east of Ravenstone, now in the parish of Ravenstone with Snibstone, in the North West Leicestershire district, in the county of Leicestershire, England. Originally rural, part of Snibston was transformed into a coal mining village by the opening of coal mines by the Snibston Colliery Company in the early 1830s. This industrial part of Snibston was subsequently subsumed into the developing town of Coalville, though small rural areas of Snibston survive within the civil parishes of Ravenstone with Snibston and Hugglescote and Donington le Heath. In the part of Snibston within the latter civil parish stands the 13th-century church of St Mary, noted as the smallest church still in use for regular worship in England. The main Snibston Colliery was sunk in 1831, and after its closure the Snibston Country Park with the Snibston Discovery Museum (now closed) was built on part of the colliery site. Part of the park is Snibston Grange Local Nature Reserve.

== History of Snibston and Snibston Colliery ==
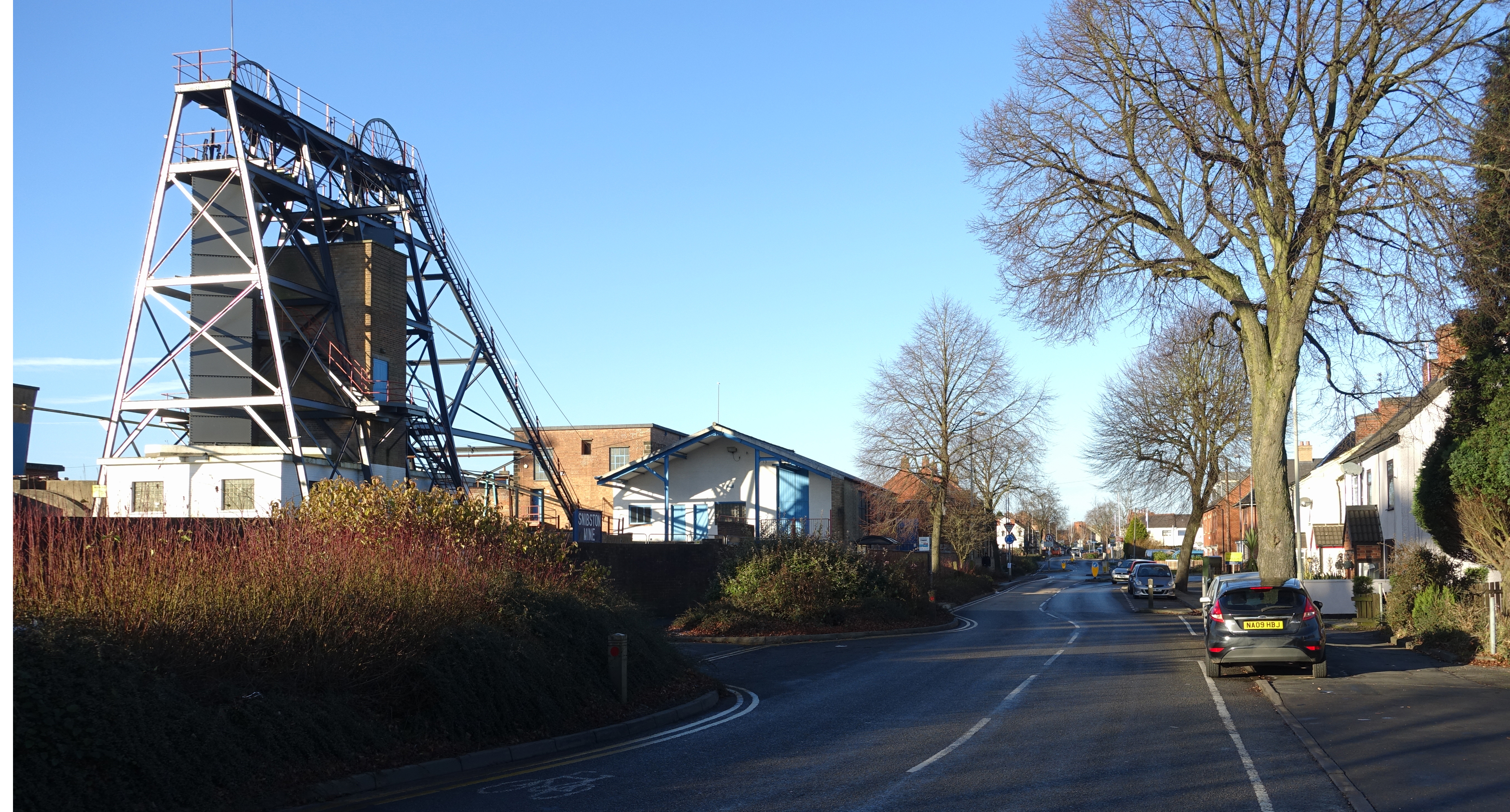
Ashby Road, Snibston, with the No. 1 pit top and headstocks of Snibston Colliery No. 2 on the left, and ex-miners dwellings on the right.

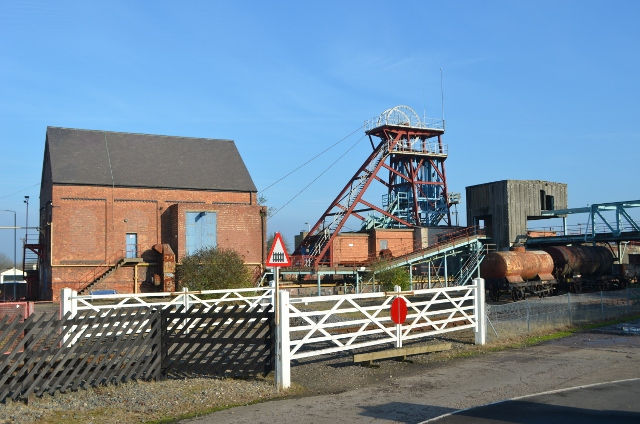
Snibston Colliery in 2011

The famous pioneering railway engineers George Stephenson and his son Robert Stephenson came to the Snibston area in the late 1820s in their involvement with the Leicester and Swannington Railway, which was being built to carry coal from this area to Leicester. Quick to appreciate the potential, in 1831 they sank shafts to the coal on the north side of the railway near the centre of what is now Coalville. The choice of position for the mine was a little unfortunate since there were problems with water and hard rock, and the Stephensons were probably not entirely happy with what was to be named Snibston Colliery No. 1.

Leonard Fosbrooke of Ravenstone Hall and Snibston Grange owned the Snibston estate. After his death in 1830 the estate, including an uncompleted colliery with a new Boulton and Watt type steam engine and colliery equipment, was put up for sale. The estate was purchased by the Stephensons, and Snibston Colliery No. 2 was completed there, together with miners' cottages, with the help of finance from Liverpool merchants. This is the present colliery, though much altered since, known simply as Snibston Colliery.

John Marius Wilson's Imperial Gazetteer of England and Wales (1872) described Snibston as a 'hamlet in Packington parish, Leicester; near the Swannington railway, 4½ miles SE of Ashby-de-la-Zouch. Pop., 595. Houses, 110. The manor belongs to Lady Edith Hastings. Coal is extensively worked. There is a very old chapel of ease.'

The Snibston collieries were two of the three coal mines sunk in the 1820s and 1830s, along with Whitwick Colliery, that helped create the town of Coalville. The majority of Snibston is now just a district of Coalville but is distinguished by the buildings and headstocks of Snibston Colliery No. 2, and Snibston Country Park, within The National Forest.

The Snibston Colliery Company opened Snibston Colliery No. 3 about half a mile to the north of Colliery No. 2 in 1850. It had a short life, closing in 1895.

On 24 March 1884 the parish was abolished and re-classified as "Ravenstone with Snibstone".

In 1894, with the growth of the population centred on the area that had been given the name Coalville, Coalville Urban District was created and a new Coalville civil parish was formed from the whole of the urban parts of Ravenstone with Snibston and Swannington, part of Hugglescote and Donington and part of Whitwick.

Snibston Colliery No. 2 produced coal continuously from 1833 to 1983. Many of the historic mining buildings are now very rare survivals of this once-widespread industry and have been designated as scheduled ancient monuments by the Government. When it finally closed in 1985, the site was bought by Leicestershire County Council with the aim of preserving the most important buildings, turning the rest of the derelict site into a recreational area and building a major new museum of science and working life. The resulting Discovery Park opened in 1992.

Snibston Colliery's railway is one of the earliest built in Britain. It was constructed by Robert Stephenson between 1833 and 1836 to connect the colliery with the Leicester and Swannington Railway on the east side of Coalville. This railway was created to carry coal, not passengers. After Snibston Colliery closed in 1983 the railway line was partially dismantled and abandoned. However the section of line from the mine to the centre of Coalville was restored between 1998 and 2001.

== Snibston Discovery Museum ==
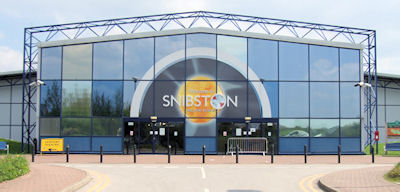
Snibston Discovery Museum

Snibston Discovery Museum (now closed) was part of Snibston Discovery Park and was built on part of the site of the former Snibston Colliery No. 2. It consisted of an award-winning interactive museum, alongside the scheduled ancient monument colliery buildings, the Century Theatre, and a 100-acre (0.40 km^{2}) country park and nature reserve, located within the National Forest.

Snibston Discovery Museum was managed by Leicestershire County Council and supported by Next and The National Forest.

The museum featured interactive exhibits, colliery tour, a train, a fashion gallery and more. The museum focused on technology and design and how it affects everyday life.

After the Museums, Libraries and Archives Council (MLA) was abolished in 2012, the museum was accredited by Arts Council England and was Heritage Lottery Funded.

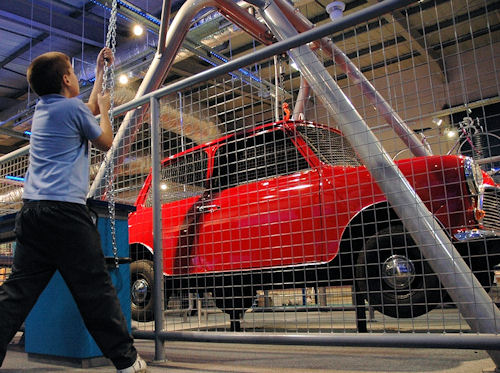
An interactive car-lifting exhibition at Snibston

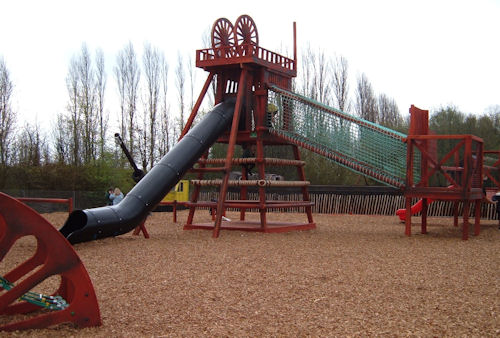
The mining-themed children's playground at Snibston

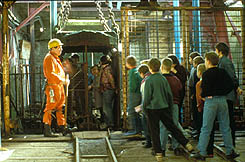
A mining tour at Snibston

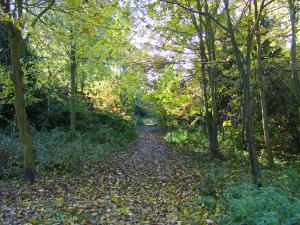
Woodland in Snibston's Country Park

=== Closure ===
In January 2015, the Conservative-controlled Leicestershire County Council announced that it could not afford the £900,000 per annum running costs of the museum and with declining visitor numbers it would be closed. Some of the land would be sold for housing, whilst the country park would be expanded and the Century Theatre would continue to function. A judicial review about whether the consultation over the closure followed the correct procedure was dismissed and the Discovery Museum closed on 31 July 2015. Demolition of the main hall commenced in March 2016, and had been completed by the end of April 2016.

The scheduled ancient monument buildings and headstocks of Snibston Colliery are not affected by the closure and demolition of the Discovery Museum except that the regular guided tours have now ceased. Snibston Country Park is also unaffected.

== Century Theatre ==
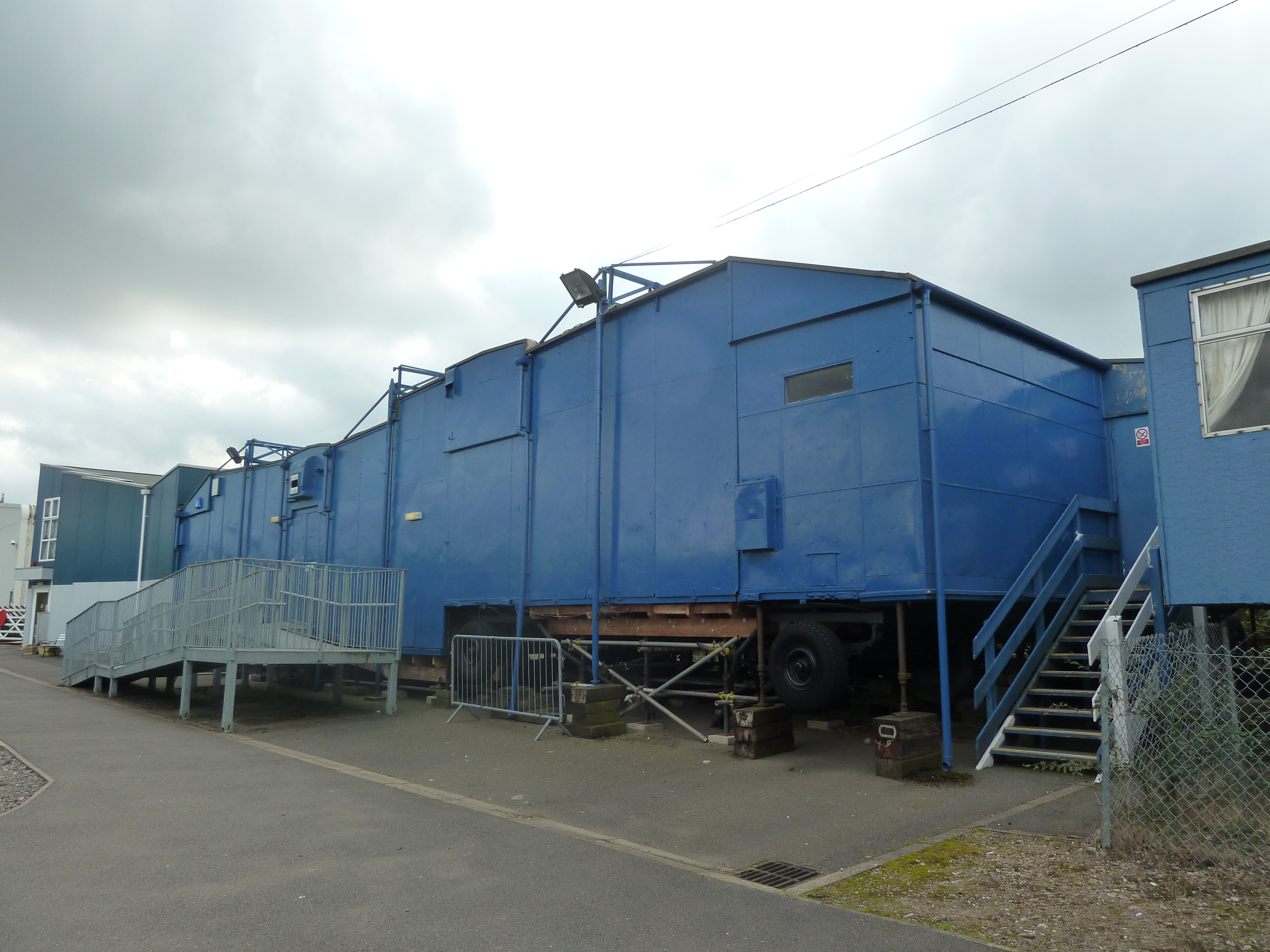
The 'Blue Box' of the original trailer-mounted Century Theatre

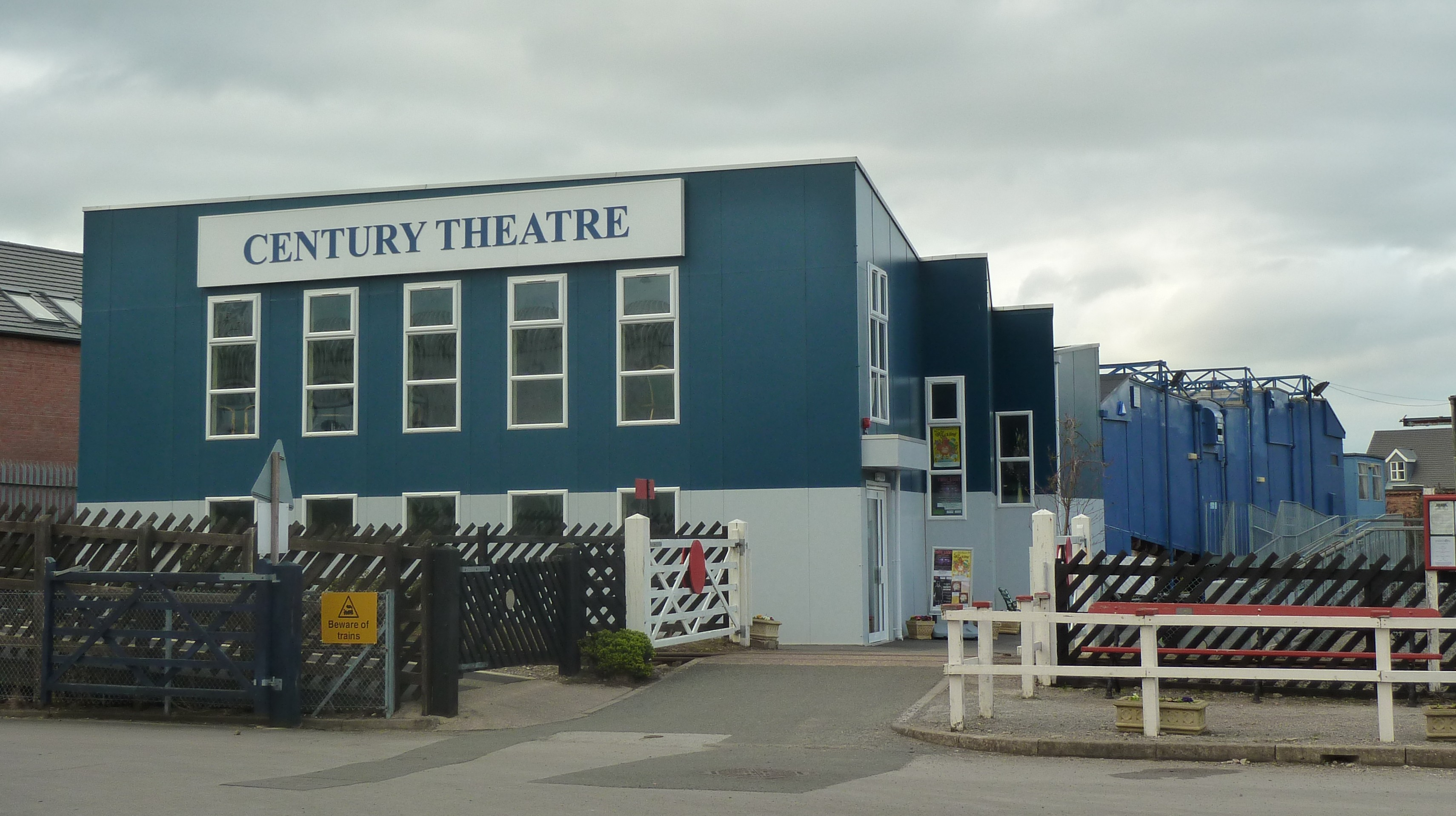
The new facade of the Century Theatre

The Century Theatre or 'the Blue Box' is a portable theatre, built on a series of ex-RAF trailers in 1952. The theatre was designed by John Ridley who used an ingenious design; an aluminium superstructure and hydraulic rams, to create a professional quality theatre building that could be folded up and moved by road.

Following its opening night in Hinckley in September 1952, the theatre toured Britain until 1974, remaining only a few weeks in each venue. From 1974 until 1997 the Century was used as the town theatre of Keswick in Cumbria, and then, thanks to support from the Heritage Lottery Fund, it was saved from the scrapyard, refurbished and brought home to Leicestershire, where it is located next to the buildings and headstocks of Snibston Colliery.

The theatre was run by its own company expressly created to take quality drama to communities throughout Britain and helped greatly with post-war cultural reconstruction. Many of the company's actors and technicians went on from touring with the Century to make important contributions to theatre in Britain and abroad.

In 1995 the Century Theatre became redundant following a Lottery grant to build a new theatre by Derwent Water in Keswick. In the following year it was acquired by Leicestershire Museums to be based permanently at Snibston Discovery Museum, Coalville just a few miles north of its original construction site in Hinckley.

The theatre was carefully dismantled in November with the help, knowledge and support of people who had been involved with the theatre over the years. It was brought home to Leicestershire on the back of four low-loaders and was renovated and reassembled on a purpose-built site between the museum gallery and the historic mine buildings of the former Snibston Colliery.

It re-opened in October 1997 and since then has been part of the cultural life of North West Leicestershire as a venue for a range of arts activities including classic drama, music and dance. A new 2-storey front of house was added in 2011 giving the venue an extra dimension and mezzanine lounge bar, toilet facilities and full disabled access.

== Snibston Colliery Park ==
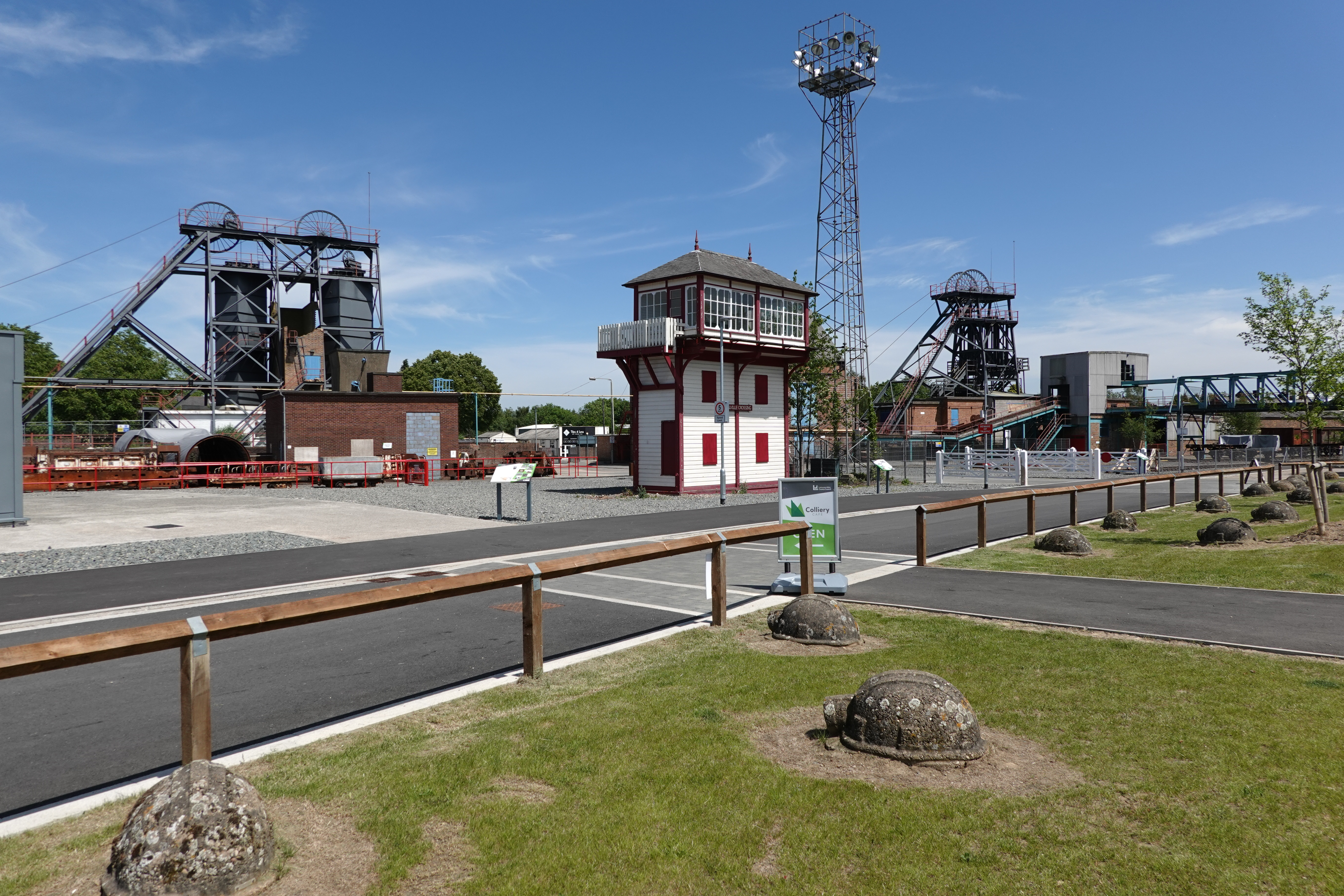
Snibston Colliery in 2021, after a footpath through the site, a new car park, and a new café was opened

Snibston Colliery Park was opened in late 2020. Limited access to the Snibston Colliery site was restored, together with the opening of a footpath along the route of the former railway branch into the colliery, a new Colliery Café, a new car park, and a heritage trail. The park also includes the adjacent nature reserve. In April 2022 the first guided tours of the colliery buildings for many years were inaugurated, hosted by Snibston Heritage Trust in collaboration with Leicestershire County Council.
