= Hugglescote and Donington le Heath =

Civil parish in North West Leicestershire, England

Coordinates: 52.71°N 1.375°W

Hugglescote and Donington le Heath Parish Council

Type
- Type: Parish council

Leadership
- chairman: Councillor Russell Johnson
- Vice-chairman: Councillor Clark Robinson

Structure
- Seats: 9
- Political groups: Labour (1); Independents (6)

Elections
- Last election: 7 May 2015
- Next election: 2 May 2019

Meeting place
- Hugglescote Community Centre, Grange Road, Hugglescote

Hugglescote and Donington le Heath is a civil parish in North West Leicestershire, England. It includes the villages of Hugglescote and Donington le Heath, each of which is about 1 mile (1.6 km) south of the centre of Coalville. The population of the civil parish at the 2011 census was 4,446.

The council consists of nine elected councillors who serve the whole parish.

At its annual meeting, held in May each year, the council appoints a chairman and vice-chairman. The current chairman is Councillor Russell Johnson (Labour) and the current vice-chairman is Councillor Clark Robinson.

Clockwise, from the north, it borders the unparished area of Coalville and the parishes of Ellistown and Battleflat, Ravenstone with Snibston and Ibstock.

== History ==
Both villages were part of the parish of Ibstock until 1878, when they were formed into a separate civil parish. In 1936 the parish was absorbed by the then urban district of Coalville. The civil parish of Hugglescote and Donington le Heath was reinstated by an order made in May 2010, and the new parish council held its inaugural meeting in May 2011.

== Current composition ==
Group affiliation	Members
Labour	1
Independent	7
Conservative	0
Total	8

== Election history ==
Elections to the council take place every four years at the same time as other local government elections in England. The council's inaugural election was held on 5 May 2011 and resulted in nine councillors being elected from a field of twelve candidates.

=== 2011 election ===
Hugglescote & Donington le Heath Parish Council (9 seats)
Party	Candidate	Votes	%	±%
Labour	Steve Peace	564	10.3	N/A
Labour	Lauren Otter	551	10.1	N/A
Labour	Josh Mills	545	10.0	N/A
Independent	Steve Palmer	538	9.8	N/A
Conservative	John Cotterill	506	9.2	N/A
Labour	Terri Eynon	502	9.2	N/A
Independent	Janet Hammonds	467	8.5	N/A
Independent	Stephen Watson	412	7.5	N/A
Independent	Ian Abbott	403	7.4	N/A
Independent	Stephen Lofthouse	391	7.1	N/A
Independent	Peter Shelton	375	6.9	N/A
Independent	Matthew Pollard	218	4.0	N/A

=== 2015 Election ===
In 2015 the Parish was warded, Hugglescote St Mary's and Hugglescote St John's respectively. At the close of nominations only 6 councillors had come forward, thankfully at the first meeting of the new cycle 2 new members were co-opted meaning the council was almost back to full strength.

Hugglescote & Donington le Heath Parish Council (9 seats)
Party	Candidate	Votes	%	±%
Labour	Russell Johnson	"Uncontested"	N/A	N/A
Conservative	Will Jennings	"Uncontested"	N/A	N/A
Independent	Steve Palmer	"Co-opted"	N/A	N/A
Independent	Louise Ross-Foden	"Uncontested"	N/A	N/A
Independent	John Ross-Foden	"Uncontested"	N/A	N/A
Independent	Mark Tudor	"Uncontested"	N/A	N/A
Independent	Ian Abbott	"Co-opted"	N/A	N/A
Independent	Pam Springthorpe	"Co-opted"	N/A	N/A
Independent	John Jordan	"Co-opted"	N/A	N/A
