= Henry Dennis =

English hymnist (1818–1887)

- Born: 1818; Ticknall
- Died: December 4th 1887 Hugglescote
- Occupation: Hymnist/Farmer

Henry Dennis (1818–1887) was a nineteenth-century hymnist, who earned worldwide fame for his hymn tune, 'Euphony'.

A Leicestershire farmer, Dennis composed fifty-four anthems and six hymn tunes. Born at Ticknall in Derbyshire, Dennis is said to have entered the choir of the local Baptist Chapel at such an early age that he had to stand on the seat of his pew during the singing so as to allow the sound of his voice to be heard. The young Dennis also became a skilled violinist.

The melody of his most celebrated work, Euphony, is said to have come to him during a cricket match in 1843 and was first published in 1850, in a magazine called, The Soul's Welfare as a tune to 'Sweet is the work, my God, my King'. It was originally called 'Euphonia', the name later being shortened to 'Euphony' by the composer himself. The tune quickly became popular around the country and later reached such distant places as India, South Africa and the Antipodes. Dr William Morley Punshon - a celebrated Wesleyan evangelist of the time - once said that if there was any tune he would like to sing in heaven, it would be Euphony

Dennis spent the last forty years of his life living in Hugglescote, Leicestershire, on an ancestral farm which had been in his maternal family's possession for over two hundred years. He became a prominent member of the Baptist community there and wrote a number of tunes and other pieces which were published by Novello & Co, and which had a large sale.

His marble tombstone can be found in the old Baptist cemetery off Grange Road, Hugglescote, which is carved with a violin and an open scroll, on which are engraved the first two lines of Euphony.

Dennis Street in Hugglescote is so-named in his honour.

A grandson of Henry Dennis was Frederick Herbert Wood Mus.Doc, who was organist of Blackpool Parish Church from 1918 until 1963.
