= Ravenstone (band) =

American rock band

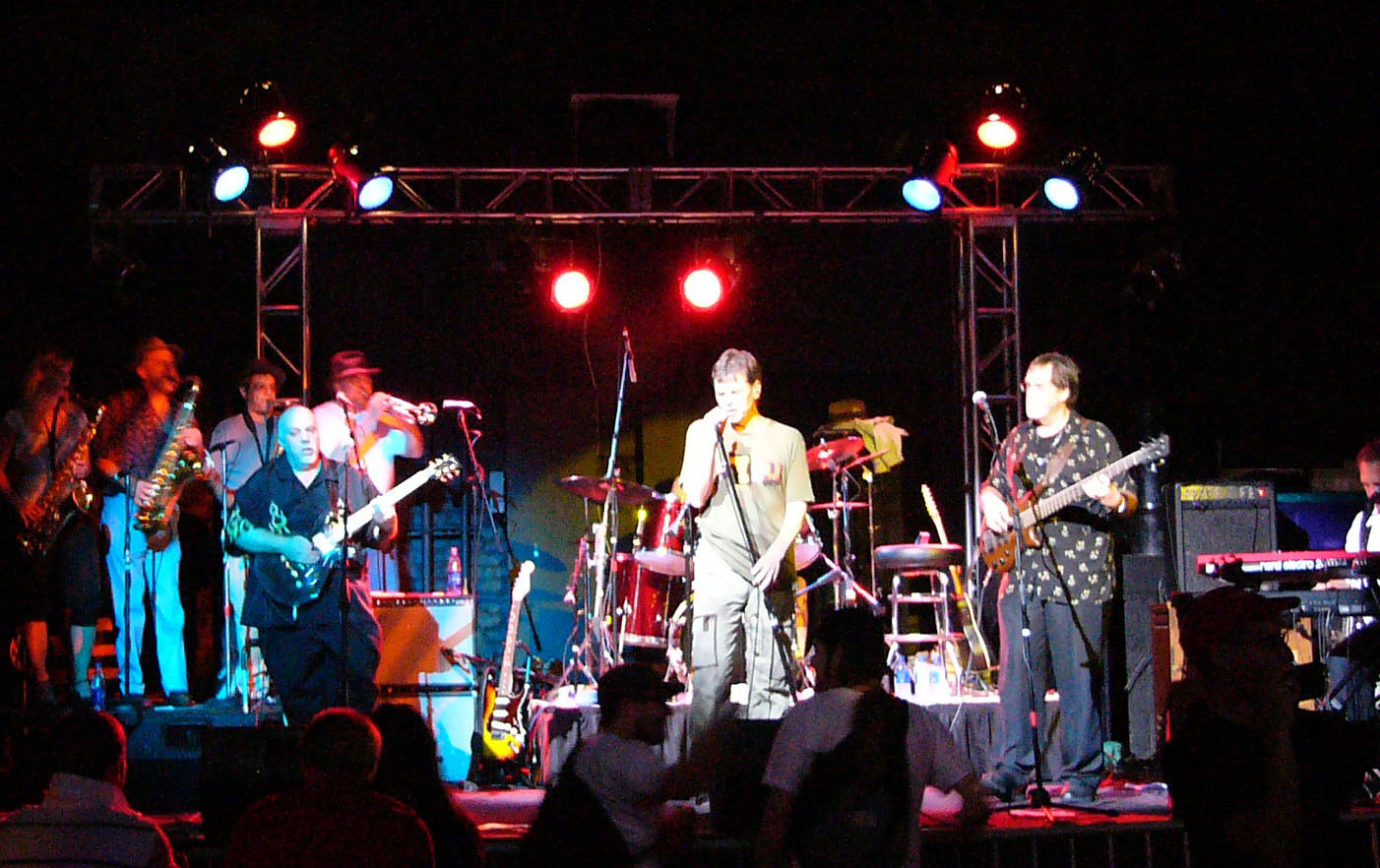
- Ravenstone in concert, the Ritz, Athens, Georgia, August 27, 2005

Background information
- Origin: Athens, Georgia, USA
- Genres: Rock, Dance Rock, Protopunk
- Years active: 1971–1974, 2003 to present
- Label: Prince Avenue Records
- Members: Butch Blasingame; Dwight Brown; Michael A. Simpson; Ralph Towler; Bill Wilson
- Past members: Randy Delay; Greg Veale; Bob Wharton; Gary Davis; David Pinkston
- Website: www.ravenstoneband.com

Ravenstone is an American rock band formed in Athens, Georgia in 1971 by Butch Blasingame (lead guitar, vocals), Dwight Brown, (bass, acoustic guitar, vocals), Michael A. Simpson, (vocals, harmonica, percussion, air raid siren), Ralph Towler (guitar, mandolin, keyboards, vocals) and Bill Wilson (drums, saxophone, clarinet, vocals). A popular group in the southeastern United States during the early 1970s, the band is considered one of the godfathers of the internationally acclaimed Athens rock scene.

Blasingame, Simpson, and Wilson (the only Athens native) created the group after meeting in a University of Georgia (UGA) drama class. The band's name is a literary reference to a field where witches are executed in Johann Wolfgang von Goethe's Faust, a play the three were studying at the time. Blasingame recruited Brown and Towler, two university students from his hometown of Monroe, Georgia, with whom he had previously performed with in the group Edifice Wrecks.

From the beginning, the band's original music was credited to all five members, listing them in alphabetic order. Although Simpson is the group's lyricist, all members provide input in songwriting. The band's early music was muscular and lyrically intense, combining prototype punk elements with roots rock, British invasion and soul influences. Their sound was characterized by Blasingame's blistering guitar style, the tight rhythm section of Brown and Towler anchored on the jazz inflections of Wilson's drumming, and Simpson's distinctive baritone, falsetto flourishes and topical lyrics. Simpson used a World War II-era air raid siren as an instrument during concerts.

During the band's early period, Ravenstone's concerts and club performances were notable for the band's wit, stage antics and political activism as much as their music. Known to their fans as the Ravesters, the group's mix of humor and politics was illustrated in an early band photograph that featured Brown in a bow tie and a gas mask, Wilson dressed in a military uniform hanging on a granite cross, and Simpson wearing a tee shirt printed with the logo of a well-known comic book superhero.

The group is noted for its support of social issues, which predated and foreshadowed the activism of later Athens music groups such as R.E.M. In March 1972 Ravenstone played at a gay rights dance, reportedly the first ever openly held in the southeast United States, in the Memorial Ballroom on the UGA campus. A court injunction was required for the campus concert to occur after the university refused to allow it on grounds that it would be "aiding and abetting" sodomy – a felony under Georgia law at the time that carried a penalty of up to 20 years imprisonment. The Ku Klux Klan reportedly harassed the band after their performance.

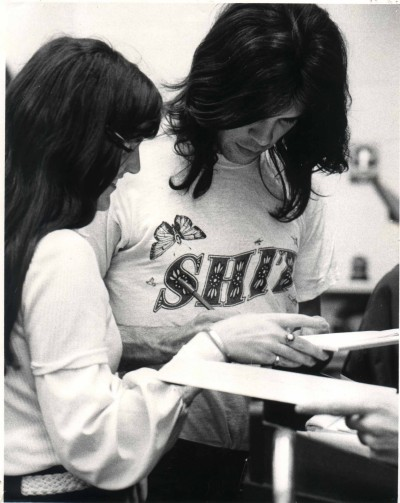

Simpson was questioned by administration officials after he made controversial political statements during on-campus shows. He also made provocative stage wardrobe choices, including shirts with the number 666 displayed over an upside-down cross and one with a four-letter scatological American slang term that he stated was the initials for the Sam Houston Institute of Technology. Despite objections from administration officials, a full-page photograph of Simpson wearing the tee, angled as to not fully reveal the last initial, was subsequently printed in the university's 1973 student yearbook. An article written about the group in an Atlanta counterculture underground newspaper noted the band's blend of politics and original music.

At an outdoor voter registration rally near the UGA administration building in May 1972, they were threatened with arrest after the band performed "Off A Pig", which advocated veganism, not violence against the police. (Police were widely known as "pigs" in American slang at the time.) The band responded to the police threat by playing louder. Plainclothes policemen were stationed outside of the university president's office, reportedly out of concern that the band's confrontational attitude and politically charged music would incite the several hundred students attending the show to riot.

In the spring of 1972, Ravenstone began recording More Love, their first album, at Atlanta's Web IV Studios. After several tracks were completed the band broke up. A version of the album's title track was subsequently included as a bonus feature for the DVD release of the cult horror film Sleepaway Camp II: Unhappy Campers, which Simpson directed in 1987. The track was also on the band's EP release in 2003. Other songs from the Web IV recording sessions have not been released to date.

After the departure of Wilson, Towler and Brown from the group, Blasingame and Simpson continued to perform and tour regionally as Ravenstone with other musicians including drummer Randy Delay, whose later work included the Georgia Satellites' "Keep Your Hands To Yourself," and bassist Greg Veale, who subsequently became a founding member of the Athens group Normaltown Flyers. Ravenstone disbanded entirely in 1974.

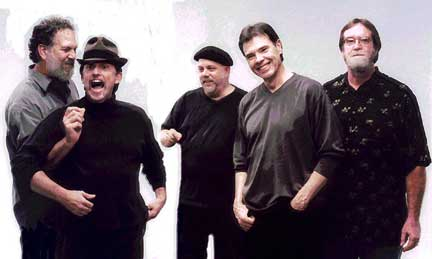
Ravenstone today.

The original members of Ravenstone reunited in 2003. They released Back on the Rock in 2005 and returned to Athens for a performance at The Ritz, which was chronicled on the DVD One Night Only: Ravenstone Live At The Ritz.

== Discography ==
- More Love (EP single) 2003
- Back On The Rock (CD) 2005
- Dance of Life (EP single) 2007
- Shades in the Shadows (CD) forthcoming
- Sleepaway Camp II: Unhappy Campers (DVD) 2004 "More Love" bonus feature
- One Night Only: Ravenstone Live at The Ritz (DVD) 2006
