= Donington le Heath Manor House Museum =

Coordinates: 52°42′36.22″N 1°22′46.75″W

Donington le Heath Manor House Museum, now 'The 1620s House and Garden at Donington le Heath' is a surviving example of a manor house built over seven hundred years ago in Donington le Heath, near the town of Coalville, Leicestershire. It was once owned by a relative of one of the Gunpowder plotters, and is now managed by Leicestershire County Council.

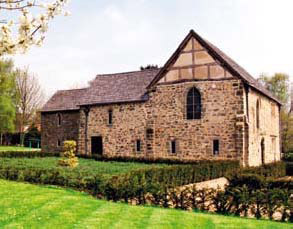
Donington le Heath Manor House

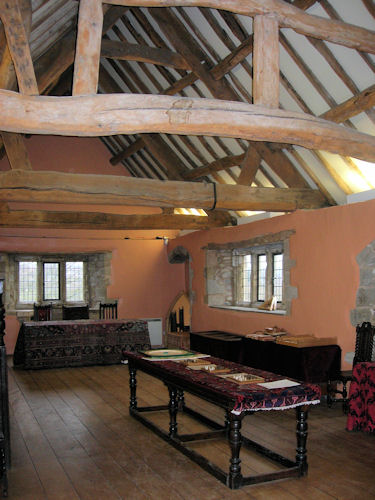
Inside Donington Museum

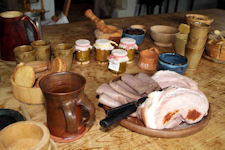
Tudor foods laid out during a re-enactment

The Museum is accredited by the Museums, Libraries and Archives Council (MLA)

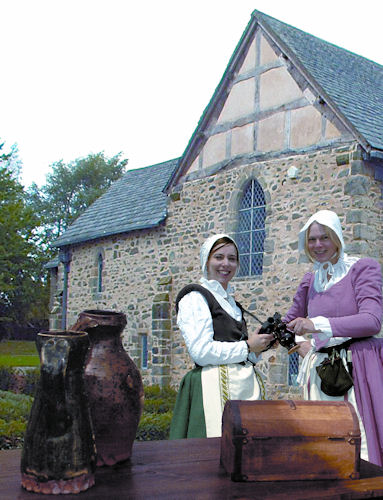
Tudor education sessions at Donington

== History ==
The museum is based in a medieval manor house, believed to date back to around 1290. From the style of the architecture of the parts of the building and from tree-ring dating of some of the timbers still present, the present house at Donington was probably built between 1288 and 1295.

A house on this site and the present building were owned by the Charley Priory, then Ulverscroft Priory until the 1530s and several tenants are known to have lived there during this time, including Robert and Isabella de Herle, who probably built the present house.

Some of the features of the house, along with tree-ring dating of the timbers in the roof, show that the Manor House was heavily modernised around 1618. It appears that at this time, the downstairs storerooms were converted into a kitchen and a parlour. A new roof was put on and the rooms upstairs were remodelled with a new internal staircase. Externally, the most obvious addition from this period are the large rectangular mullioned windows. At this time, the house was probably owned by John Digby of Seaton, whose nephew, Sir Everard Digby was a friend of Robert Catesby and was executed in 1606 for his part in the Gunpowder Plot.

From 1670 to 1960, the house was rented out as a tenant farm, with proceeds going to support a hospital and Orphanage in Osgathorpe. Leicestershire County Council bought the Manor House in 1965 after it had become a pig farm and fallen into disrepair. A large project was then undertaken to preserve the building for future generations. The Manor House was opened as a museum in 1973.

== Digby family: Recussant Catholics and the Gunpowder Plot ==
Donington le Heath Manor House was tenanted by members of the Digby family from the early 15th century and they owned the site and its lands from the 1530s until 1627. The Digby's main seat was at Tilton on the Hill in east Leicestershire, but they held land in many other parishes.

Sir John Digby fought at the Bosworth Battlefield in 1485 for Henry Tudor. When Henry defeated King Richard III and became King Henry VII he would have rewarded his supporters and it may be the case that he gave back the lands that the Digbys had lost in 1462 for their opposition to the Yorkist King Edward IV. In the early 1600s the property was owned by John Digby of Seaton. John was a known recusant Catholic and he and his family were regularly fined and excommunicated from the Church of England. While John himself had been imprisoned in the Tower of London under suspicion of involvement n the Babington Plot against Elizabeth I, his nephew, Sir Everard Digby, had moved away having married a wealthy heiress in Buckinghamshire and had become a friend of Robert Catesby, the leader of the Gunpowder Plotters.

Sir Everard was asked to raise a Midlands rebellion after the Plotters had blown up Parliament and he was intending to kidnap the Princess Elizabeth, James I's daughter, from Coombe Abbey. He was hung drawn and quartered in 1606 for being one of the Catholic Plotters. John Digby died in 1627 and the Donington site was divided up between two families.

== The House today ==
In 2016 the Site was refurbished as the 1620s House and Garden telling the story of the Catholic Digbys living in Protestant England. All the rooms are fully furnished as they might have been at the time and the mixture of original and replica furniture and household objects can be touched and used - with one exception. An ornately carved four poster bed has been connected with Leicester's Blue Boar Inn at which Richard III is thought to have stayed just before the Battle of Bosworth and has therefore been known as King Dick's Bed. Its style suggests a much later date than 1485 however, and it fits perfectly into a Jacobean family home.

== Friends ==
The Friends organisation for Donington exists to support the museum's further development through fundraising, and funds much of the work in the gardens. The Friends of Donington le Heath Manor House is a Registered charity Number 1084997.
