= Three Horseshoes, Whitwick =

Listed pub in Leicestershire, England

Three Horseshoes
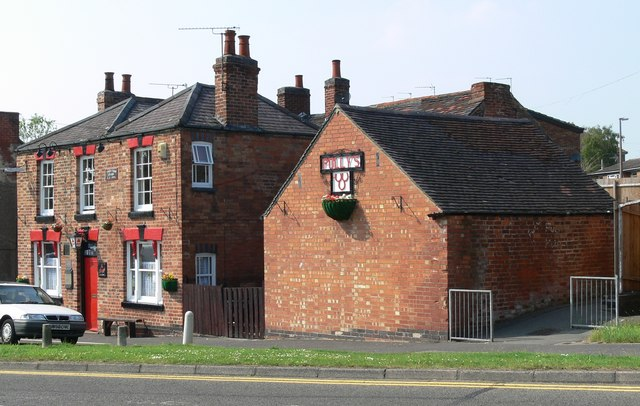
- The pub in 2007
- Alternative names: Polly's

General information
- Type: Public house; originally two cottages
- Location: Leicester Road, Whitwick, Leicestershire, England
- Coordinates: 52.739826°N 1.350929°W
- Year built: Early to mid-18th century
- Opening: 1882; 144 years ago (as a pub)
- Renovated: 2022 (refurbished)
- Owner: Admiral Taverns

Design and construction
- Designations

Listed Building – Grade II
- Official name: Three Horseshoes public house
- Designated: 18 February 2005
- Reference no.: 1391321

The Three Horseshoes is a Grade II listed public house on Leicester Road in Whitwick, a village in Leicestershire, England. Originating as two early to mid-19th-century cottages, it was converted and extended to form a pub in 1882. The public house retains a largely intact late Victorian interior and is included on the Campaign for Real Ale (CAMRA)'s National Inventory of Historic Pub Interiors, where it is rated three stars and described as being of "outstanding national historic importance".

== History ==
The building originated as two early to mid-19th-century cottages and was converted and extended with the addition of a front range to form a public house in 1882. Whitwick developed as a mining community following the opening of Whitwick Colliery in the 1820s. Much of the development along Leicester Road took place between 1850 and 1900, and pubs such as the Three Horseshoes were established to serve the growing population. The pub was owned by the Burton/Callaghan family from 1909. Although the colliery closed in the late 20th century, the Three Horseshoes, known locally as "Polly's" after a former landlady, survives as a notably complete example of a later 19th-century two-room working-class public house.

It was included on the Campaign for Real Ale (CAMRA)'s National Inventory of Historic Pub Interiors before the inventory's grading system was revised. Under the revised scheme, it is rated three stars and its interior is regarded as being "of outstanding national historic importance". On 18 February 2005, the Three Horseshoes was designated a Grade II listed building. In June 2022, a new tenant took over and carried out a refurbishment that retained the building's historic character. As of February 2026, the freehold was owned by Admiral Taverns.

== Architecture ==
=== Exterior ===
The building is constructed of red brick, with a hipped slate roof to the front range and a plain-tile roof to the rear. It has two storeys and several brick chimney stacks to the sides and rear. The front range, added in 1882 and marked by a plaque on the principal elevation, has three sash windows at first-floor level. The ground floor contains a central entrance with an overlight, flanked by tripartite windows. The door and window openings have stucco lintels with keystones and painted stone sills. The side elevations contain mainly margin-pane sash windows, although the upper window on the left side is a one-over-one sash. To the rear right stands the earlier 19th-century range, which retains a truncated gable-end chimney stack and has 20th-century windows on its front elevation. Attached to the far right is a single-storey outbuilding that projects forward and presents a gable end to the road.

=== Interior ===
The ground floor is arranged around a central servery, with two rooms at the front. The main entrance opens into a partly glazed timber lobby, facing an off-sales hatch that survives from the historic layout and remains in occasional use. To the left is the public bar, entered through a doorway with an overlight. It retains a quarry-tiled floor, late 19th-century panelled bar fittings, a low bar counter, bar-back shelving, two fireplaces with timber and tiled surrounds, and fixed timber benches along the external walls. The extensive bench seating spans the junction between the two former cottages, illustrating the building's conversion to pub use. A room number survives on the inner face of the door, reflecting a former licensing requirement to number pub rooms. To the right is the saloon bar, which has a boarded floor and a serving hatch connecting to the servery. It contains a fireplace with a carved timber surround and retains a dado rail. The room also preserves fixed bench seating and historic Formica-topped tables. Other notable survivals include an internal baffle near the entrance to the former outside toilets, while later alterations appear to have been limited largely to the enclosure of some seating towards the rear.
