= The Three Horseshoes, Monmouth =

The Three Horse Shoes
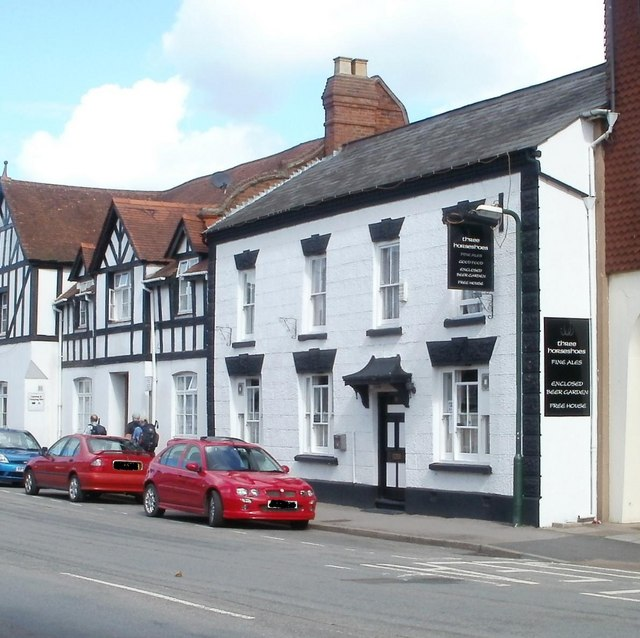
- The Three Horse Shoes, Monmouth
- Interactive map of the The Three Horse Shoes area
- Former names: The Three Horse Shoes Inn

General information
- Type: ex-Public House (1888–2018)
- Location: 21 Drybridge Street, Monmouth, Wales
- Coordinates: 51.80908°N 2.7213°W
- Completed: Before 1888
- Landlord: Not a pub

The Three Horseshoes used to be a public house in Drybridge Street in the Overmonnow area of Monmouth, Wales. The pub has also been used as an Inn and also known as The Three Horse Shoes Inn. The building has been a Grade II Listed building since 15 August 1974. Appears of 19th century but of C17th origin. 2 storeys, roughcast as stone with a hooded doorway

The pub ceased trading in 2018.

== History ==
The pub was originally set up by Blacksmith William Philips in the 1880s. The forge that Philips set up was also in Drybridge Street and had been set up in 1859. The Three Horse shoes name coming from the business that Philips was picking up from passing trade where a horse had shed a shoe.

In 1923 Osbert Wheeler was the publican the Three Horse Shoes yard was occupied by a horse breaker called Victor Mackie.

The pub completely ceased trading in 2018, and the building was stripped of all its pub-related fixtures, then left empty for 4–5 years. It last changed hands in 2023 and it is not expected to be re-opening as a pub.
