= Donington le Heath =

Village in Leicestershire, England

Coordinates: 52.7089°N 1.3797°W

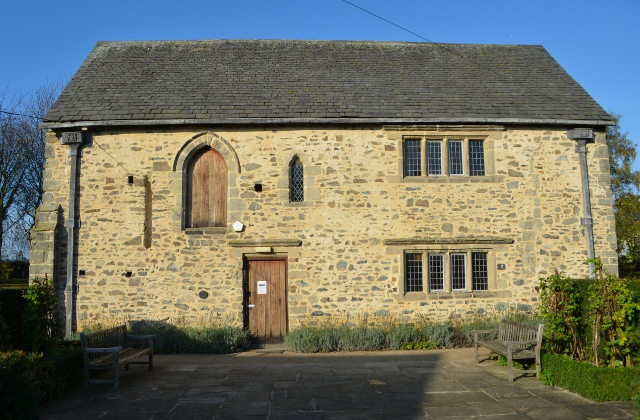
- Donington le Heath Manor House

- Location within Leicestershire
- OS grid reference: SK4112
- Civil parish: Hugglescote and Donington le Heath
- District: North West Leicestershire
- Shire county: Leicestershire
- Region: East Midlands
- Country: England
- Sovereign state: United Kingdom
- Post town: Coalville
- Postcode district: LE67
- Dialling code: 01530
- Police: Leicestershire
- Fire: Leicestershire
- Ambulance: East Midlands
- UK Parliament: North West Leicestershire
- Website: Hugglescote and Donington le Heath Parish Council

Donington le Heath is a village on the River Sence just over 1 mile (1.6 km) south of the centre of Coalville in North West Leicestershire. Donington is contiguous with the village of Hugglescote immediately to the east. The population of the village is included in the civil parish of Hugglescote and Donington le Heath.

Donington le Heath and Hugglescote and were part of the parish of Ibstock until 1878, when they were formed into a separate civil parish. In 1936 the parish was absorbed by the then urban district of Coalville. The civil parish of Hugglescote and Donington le Heath was reinstated by an order made in May 2010, and the new parish council held its first meeting in May 2011.

== History ==
The village's name means 'farm/settlement of Dunna'.

As early as 1220 both Donington le Heath and Hugglescote were dependent chapelries of the parish of Ibstock. By the 18th century however, these buildings were practically ruinous. Saint Peter's Donington was demolished in about 1770 and has never been replaced.

Farmland in the township was enclosed in 1774. In 1945 this estate was sold by Brigadier C. L. O. Tayleur.

In 1831 the chief landed proprietors were Osgathorpe Hospital and Wigston's Hospital, Leicester. The lord of the manor was the Marquess of Hastings and the royalties were owned by the Earl of Stamford and Warrington. At the time of the Domesday Survey Turchil held the manor from Nigel Albini. Nigel gave lands here to Bec Abbey. In 1469 King Edward IV gave the manor to William Hastings, Lord Hastings.

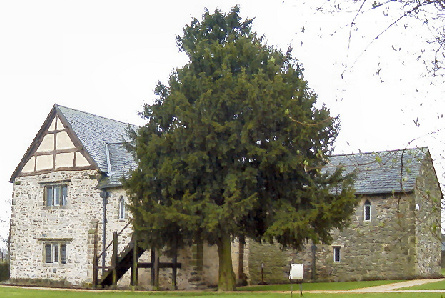
Donington Old Manor House

Donington le Heath Manor House, built around 1280, is one of the oldest surviving houses in England. The building stands on Anglo-Saxon foundations, suggesting that an even earlier structure occupied the site: it has a hall facing south and two wings on the north side and a moat. There are some alterations made in the 17th century, including some of the windows and the ground floor entrance.

The house is a Grade II* listed building and next to it is a medieval barn that is also listed. Leicestershire County Council renovated the house and barn, making the house a public museum and the barn its tea room.

== Amenities ==
Donington le Heath has a public house, The Donington Arms (formerly The Corner Pin), on The Green beside the River Sence.
