= Ravenstone with Snibston =

Civil parish in Leicestershire, England

Coordinates: 52.723°N 1.396°W

Ravenstone with Snibstone
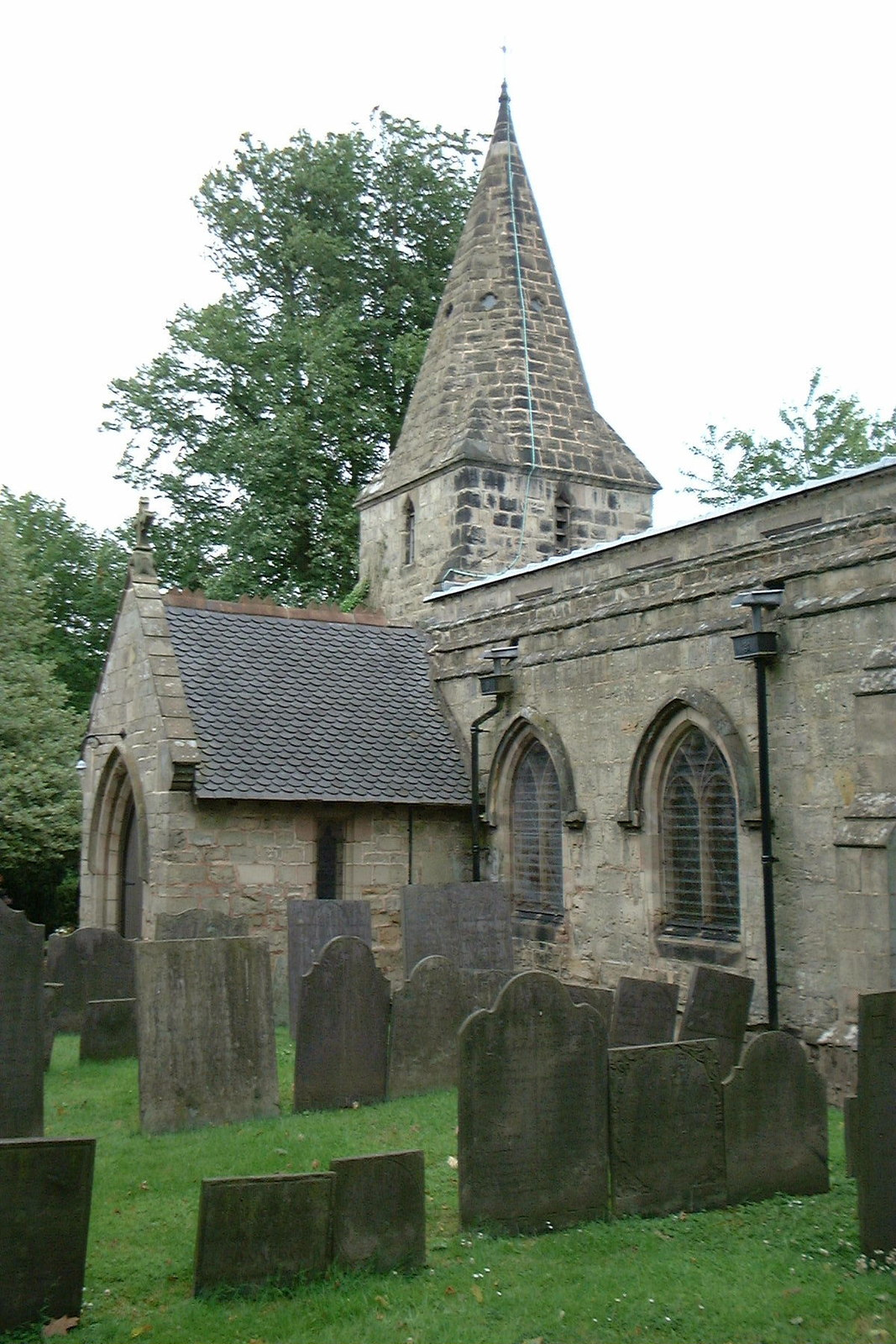
- Ravenstone

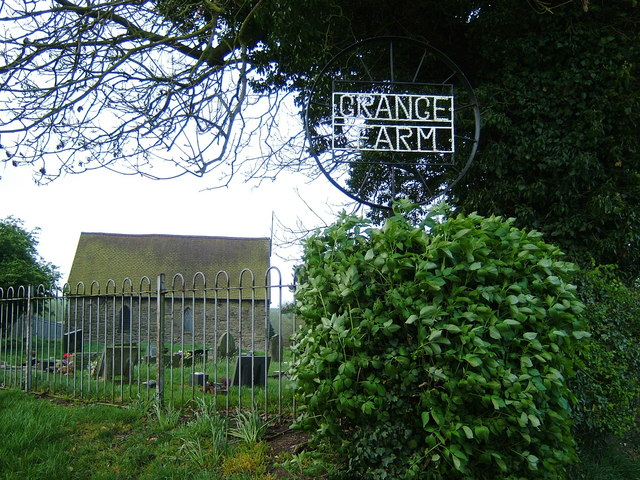
- Snibston

- Location within Leicestershire
- Population: 2,854 (2021 census)
- Civil parish: Ravenstone with Snibstone
- District: North West Leicestershire
- Shire county: Leicestershire
- Region: East Midlands
- Country: England
- Sovereign state: United Kingdom
- Police: Leicestershire
- Fire: Leicestershire
- Ambulance: East Midlands

Ravenstone with Snibston is a civil parish in the North West Leicestershire district of Leicestershire, England. According to the 2001 census it had a population of 2,149, increasing to 2,212 (including Donington le Heath) at the 2011 census and 2,854 in the 2021 census. The parish includes Ravenstone, part of Snibston and the hamlet of Sinope. The parish was created in 1884.
