= North West Leicestershire District Council elections =

Local government elections in Leicestershire, England

North West Leicestershire District Council elections are held every four years. North West Leicestershire District Council is the local authority for the non-metropolitan district of North West Leicestershire in Leicestershire, England. Since the last boundary changes in 2015, 38 councillors are elected from 38 wards.

== Political control ==
The first election to the council was held in 1973, initially operating as a shadow authority before coming into its powers on 1 April 1974. Since 1973 political control of the council has been held by the following parties:

Party in control	Years
Labour	1973–1976
No overall control	1976–1979
Labour	1979–1983
No overall control	1983–1991
Labour	1991–2007
Conservative	2007–2023
No overall control	2023–present

Following the 2023 election, the council's composition is:

↓
17	5	4	12
Labour	LDem	Ind	Conservative

=== Leadership ===
The leaders of the council since 2003 have been:

Councillor	Party	From	To
Frank Straw	Labour	pre-2003	6 May 2007
Richard Blunt	Conservative	15 May 2007	

== Elections and results ==
	Overall control	Labour	Conservative	Lib Dem	BNP	Green	Independent
2023	NOC	17	12	5	-	-	4
2019	Conservative	10	20	4	-	1	3
2015	Conservative	10	25	1	0	0	2
Ward boundary changes
2011	Conservative	16	21	1	0	0	0
2007	Conservative	5	27	3	2	-	1
2003	Labour	20	12	4	-	-	2
Ward boundary changes; seats reduced from 40 to 38
1999	Labour	31	8	0	-	-	1
1995	Labour	35	3	0	-	-	2
1991	Labour	26	13	0	-	-	1
Ward boundary changes
1987	NOC	-	-	-	-	-	-
Ward boundary changes
1983	NOC	-	-	-	-	-	-
Ward boundary changes; number of seats changed
1979	Labour	-	-	-	-	-	-
1976	NOC	19	13	0	-	-	10
1973	Labour	25	8	0	-	-	10

A dash indicates that the results for a particular election are not available, or that a party did not stand in an election.

=== District result maps ===
2003 results map

2007 results map

2011 results map

2015 results map

2019 results map

2023 results map

== Ward details ==
Below is a summary of each ward in the District of North West Leicestershire. For each ward, a brief description is given along with a table showing its electoral history. In two or three member wards, the swings shown are based upon the average votes received by all candidates from a party.

=== Appleby ===
The Appleby ward covers several small, rural villages in the far south of the District. It has been represented by Richard Blunt since 2003; Blunt has also been the Leader of the Council since 2007. Like several of the District's geographically large rural wards, it is a safe seat for the Conservatives; it was, however, held by Labour for one term after their landslide victory in 1995.

Election	Party	Councillor	Margin	Swing
2011	Conservative	Richard Blunt	28.9%	24.3% from Con to Ind
2007	Conservative	Richard Blunt	55.0%	5.2% from Lab to Con
2003	Conservative	Edward Blunt	44.6%	
1995	Labour	J. Lewis	20.0%	

=== Ashby Castle ===
The Ashby Castle ward is one of three wards that cover the Ashby-de-la-Zouch area. It has been represented by John Coxon since 2003. Geographically, it is the smallest of Ashby's wards and contains the 15th century Ashby Castle from which the ward takes its name. It is a very safe seat for the Conservatives who have consistently achieved a majority of between 40% and 50%, however, in 1995 they came in third place behind a Labour candidate and a victorious Independent.

Election	Party	Councillor	Margin	Swing
2011	Conservative	John Coxon	43.0%	3.0% from Con to Lab
2007	Conservative	John Coxon	49.0%	1.4% from Lab to Con
2003	Conservative	John Coxon	46.2%	
1995	Independent	G. Orme	13.5%	

=== Ashby Holywell ===
Another of Ashby-de-la-Zouch's three wards, the Ashby Holywell ward elects two councillors. It has been represented by two Conservatives, Roger Bayliss and Graham Allman, since 2003. This ward leans toward the Conservatives although it has been held by Labour in the past and saw a pro-Labour swing at the last election

Election	Party	First Councillor	Party	Second Councillor	Swing
2011	Conservative	Roger Bayliss	Conservative	Graham Allman	1.7% from Con to Lab
2007	Conservative	Roger Bayliss	Conservative	Graham Allman	4.4% from Lab to Con
2003	Conservative	Roger Bayliss	Labour	Gordon Tacey	
1995	Labour	L. Whetton	Labour	J. Fisher	

=== Ashby Ivanhoe ===
The Ashby Ivanhoe ward is the last of Ashby-de-la-Zouch's three wards; it also elects two councillors. It has been represented by two Conservatives, James Hoult and Geraint Jones, since 2007. Ivanhoe is a key marginal ward between Labour and the Conservatives. It could be considered to be a bellwether ward because it has returned two councillors for the victorious party at every election.

Election	Party	First Councillor	Party	Second Councillor	Swing
2011	Conservative	James Hoult	Conservative	Geraint Jones	2.5% from Con to Lab
2007	Conservative	James Hoult	Conservative	Geraint Jones	8.0% from Lab to Con
2003	Labour	David Whetton	Labour	Sean Sheahan	
1995	Labour	B. Mitchell	Labour	J. Roberts	

=== Bardon ===
The Bardon ward is situated in the greater Coalville area and contains the headquarters of Bardon Aggregates as well as a large quarry managed by the company. It has been represented by Michael Specht since 2011. It has been consecutively held by the Conservatives since its creation in 2003, however, it is now a three-way marginal after the Conservatives, the Lib Dems and Labour received 33.4%, 31.2% and 27.6% respectively at the last election.

Election	Party	Councillor	Margin	Swing
2011	Conservative	Michael Specht	2.2%	18.5% from Con to Lib Dem
2007	Conservative	Ted Purver	32.1%	4.4% from Lab to Con
2003	Conservative	Ted Purver	23.4%	
1995	Ward did not exist			

=== Ibstock and Heather ===
The Ibstock and Heather ward covers the village of Ibstock, which is situated approximately 2.5 miles south of Coalville, and the small village of Heather (pronounced HEE-ther); it elects three councillors. It has been represented by two Labour councillors and one Conservative since 2011. Three by-elections* have taken place in this ward since 2008; the first two of which, both in 2008, were narrowly won by Labour and the Conservatives respectively, despite a strong challenge from the BNP; the third was fairly comfortably won by Labour despite a good result for the Liberal Democrats. This ward has generally favoured Labour but has also elected Conservatives more recently.

Election	Party	First Councillor	Party	Second Councillor	Party	Third Councillor	Swing
2012*	Labour	Dave De Lacy					8.9% from Con to Lab
2011	Labour	Stacy Harris	Labour	Janet Ruff	Conservative	Virge Richichi	0.5% from Con to Lab
2008*					Conservative	Virge Richichi	21.2% from Con to BNP
2008*	Labour	Felix Fenning					18.3% from Lab to BNP
2007	Labour	Dai Male	Conservative	Craig Bowley	Conservative	Ted Blunt	7.1% from Lab to Con
2003	Labour	Dai Male	Labour	Felix Fenning	Labour	Alison Harrop	
1995	Labour	Dai Male	Labour	D. Costello	Labour	A. Smith	

=== Thringstone ===
The Thringstone ward covers the northwestern portion of Coalville and was formed after boundary changes in 2003. It has been represented by two Labour councillors since its creation. Thringstone is the safest Labour seat in the District as it is the only ward which has always returned Labour councillors; its predecessor, Holly Hayes, was also a very safe Labour seat.

Election	Party	First Councillor	Party	Second Councillor	Swing
2011	Labour	Leon Spence	Labour	Dave Everitt	4.0% from Con to Lab
2007	Labour	Pam Clayfield	Labour	Dave Everitt	12.2% from Lab to Con
2003	Labour	Pam Clayfield	Labour	Roderick Evans	
1995	Ward did not exist				

== By-elections ==
=== Overview ===
By-election	Date	Incumbent party	Result
Holly Hayes	19 August 1999	Labour	Labour
Ibstock and Heather	10 January 2008	Labour	Labour
Ibstock and Heather	18 December 2008	Conservative	Conservative
Ibstock and Heather	16 February 2012	Labour	Labour
Measham South	4 February 2016	Labour	Labour
Ibstock East	6 May 2021	Labour	Conservative
Worthington and Breedon	6 May 2021	Conservative	Conservative
Snibston South	2 May 2024	Labour	Labour

=== 2023 - 2027 ===
Long Whatton and Diseworth By-Election, 1 October 2026
Party	Candidate	Votes	%	±%
Conservative	Craig Smith	576	55.5	−4.6
Reform	Charles Pugsley	204	19.7	+19.7
Labour	Damilola Ojuri	147	14.2	−18.4
Restore	Simon Tunnicliffe	55	5.3	+5.3
Green	Drew Timms	34	3.3	+3.3
Liberal Democrats	Ian Bradley	22	2.1	−5.3
Majority		372	35.8	
Turnout		1,038		
Labour hold		Swing		

Snibston South By-Election, 2 May 2024
Party	Candidate	Votes	%	±%
Labour	Catherine Beck	222	51.3	−0.5
Independent	Dan Roberts	121	27.9	+27.9
Liberal Democrats	Paul Holliday	71	16.4	−14.2
Green	Greg Simpson	19	4.4	+4.4
Majority		101	23.3	
Turnout		433		
Labour hold		Swing		

=== 2019 - 2023 ===
Ibstock East By-Election, 6 May 2021
Party	Candidate	Votes	%	±%
Conservative	Jenny Simmons	355	57.8	+25.6
Labour	Carissma Griffiths	164	26.7	−15.1
Liberal Democrats	David Wyatt	54	8.8	+8.8
Green	Liz Fletcher	41	6.7	+6.7
Majority		191	31.1	
Turnout		614		
Conservative gain from Labour		Swing		

Worthington and Breedon By-Election, 6 May 2021
Party	Candidate	Votes	%	±%
Conservative	Raymond Morris	696	69.7	+3.2
Labour	Gregory Parle	139	13.9	−3.9
Green	Gareth Shilton	104	10.4	+10.4
Liberal Democrats	Paul Tyler	60	6.0	−9.7
Majority		557	55.8	
Turnout		999		
Conservative hold		Swing		

=== 2015 - 2019 ===
Measham South By-Election, 4 February 2016
Party	Candidate	Votes	%	±%
Labour	Sean Sheahan	257	42.8	−12.3
Conservative	Annette Bridge	202	33.7	−11.2
UKIP	Martin Green	141	23.5	+23.5
Majority		55	9.2	
Turnout		600		
Labour hold		Swing		

=== 2011 - 2015 ===
Ibstock and Heather By-Election, 16 February 2012
Party	Candidate	Votes	%	±%
Labour	Dave De Lacy	480	34.5	+4.5
Liberal Democrats	Kim Wyatt	372	26.7	+12.5
Conservative	Russell Boam	357	25.6	−13.3
Independent	Ivan Hammonds	125	9.0	−7.8
Green	Sue Morrell	32	2.3	N/A
UKIP	Jakob Whiten	26	1.9	N/A
Majority		108	7.8	
Turnout		1,392	24.9	−24.4
Labour hold		Swing	+8.9	

=== 2007 - 2011 ===
Ibstock and Heather By-Election, 18 December 2008
Party	Candidate	Votes	%	±%
Conservative	Virge Richichi	660	31.5	−11.5
BNP	Ivan Hammonds	645	30.8	N/A
Labour	Corinne Male	614	29.4	−9.8
Liberal Democrats	David Wyatt	174	8.3	−1.0
Majority		15	0.7	
Turnout		2,093	37.4	
Conservative hold		Swing	−21.2	

Ibstock and Heather By-Election, 10 January 2008
Party	Candidate	Votes	%	±%
Labour	Felix Fenning	699	30.9	−8.3
BNP	Ivan Hammonds	637	28.2	N/A
Conservative	Paul Oakden	515	22.8	−20.2
Liberal Democrats	David Wyatt	411	18.2	+8.9
Majority		62	2.7	N/A
Turnout		2,262	40.4	
Labour hold		Swing	−18.3	

=== 1999 - 2003 ===
Holly Hayes By-Election, 19 August 1999
Party	Candidate	Votes	%	±%
Labour		459	44.5	−5.1
Liberal Democrats		410	39.7	+17.1
Independent		88	8.5	−3.1
Conservative		75	7.3	−8.8
Majority		49	4.8	
Turnout		1,032		
Labour hold		Swing		
