= 2015 North West Leicestershire District Council election =

2015 UK local government election

- 7 May 2015

38 seats 20 seats needed for a majority

	First party	Second party
Party	Conservative	Liberal Democrats
Seats before	21	1
Seats after	25	1
Seat change	▲4	Steady
	Third party	Fourth party
Party	Labour	Independent
Seats before	16	0
Seats after	10	2
Seat change	▼6	▲2
- Results map of the election

Elections to elect all members of the North West Leicestershire District Council took place on 7 May 2015, simultaneously with a general election, held as one of the English local elections of that year.

At the request of the previous administration, a boundary review took place during 2014 with a view to make every ward represented by one councillor. The total number of councillors remained at 38, meaning that the final proposals from the Local Government Boundary Commission for England replaced 20 single-, double- and triple-member wards with 38, single-member.

The local Conservative governing group increased their previous majority of two gained at the previous election. The Labour Party were the only other party fielding a full slate of 38 candidates, the first time since the election four council terms ago. Five independent candidates stood, two of whom were successfully returned. Local Liberal Democrats taking in 16 candidates had one councillor before the election, who was returned (re-elected) and made no gains.

In groups or individuals not seeing any councillors returned in this election UKIP fielded their first candidates since 2007, standing in 14 seats. The Green Party stood one candidate in the Kegworth ward. One candidate from the British Democratic Party presented himself for election.

== Results ==
Note that the changes shown reflect an unchanged council size. They may be influenced by an unpredictable effect of the Boundary Commission for England aligning electorate size to the extent of wards (the body responsible for updating boundaries on demographic change to avoid the gradual natural onset of malapportionment). This change moved all areas of the district to single-councillor representation.

North West Leicestershire District Council election, 2015
Party	Seats	Gains	Losses	Net gain/loss	Seats %	Votes %	Votes	+/−
Conservative	25	N/A	N/A	+4	65.7			
Labour	10	N/A	N/A	-6	26.3			
Independent	2	N/A	N/A	+2	5.3			
Liberal Democrats	1	N/A	N/A	0	2.6			
UKIP	0	N/A	N/A	0	0.0			
Green	0	N/A	N/A	0	0.0			
British Democrats	0	N/A	N/A	0	0.0			

=== Ward by ward ===
Candidates marked by an asterisk (*) are incumbent councillors. Not all seats are new as some single-member wards have remained unchanged from the previous election.

Appleby
Party	Candidate	Votes	%	±%
Conservative	Richard Blunt *	980		
Labour	Joe Wain	403		
Majority		573		
Turnout			78.43	
Conservative win (new seat)				

Ashby Castle
Party	Candidate	Votes	%	±%
Conservative	John Coxon *	1147		
Labour	Martin Walton	439		
Majority		708		
Turnout			79.07	
Conservative win (new seat)				

Ashby Holywell
Party	Candidate	Votes	%	±%
Conservative	Roger Bayliss *	669		
Labour	Margaret Austin-Mills	466		
UKIP	Steph Whiten	232		
Liberal Democrats	Vivienne Brooks	86		
Majority		203		
Turnout			72.45	
Conservative win (new seat)				

Ashby Ivanhoe
Party	Candidate	Votes	%	±%
Conservative	Jim Hoult *	752		
Labour Co-op	Josh Mills	615		
Majority		137		
Turnout			72.56	
Conservative win (new seat)				

Ashby Money Hill
Party	Candidate	Votes	%	±%
Conservative	Graham Allman *	720		
Labour	Dave Whetton	429		
UKIP	Gareth Bott	202		
Majority		299		
Turnout			78.39	
Conservative win (new seat)				

Ashby Willesley
Party	Candidate	Votes	%	±%
Conservative	Geraint Jones *			
Labour	Dave Bigby			
Majority				
Turnout				
Conservative win (new seat)				

Ashby Woulds
Party	Candidate	Votes	%	±%
Conservative	John Bridges *			
Labour	Doug Cooper			
Majority				
Turnout				
Conservative win (new seat)				

Bardon
Party	Candidate	Votes	%	±%
Conservative	Michael Specht *	460	39.1	New
Liberal Democrats	Lee Windram	406	34.6	New
Labour	Sue Morrell	309	26.3	New
Majority		54	4.5	New
Turnout		1175	66.52	New
Conservative win (new seat)				

Blackfordby
Party	Candidate	Votes	%	±%
Labour Co-op	Sue McKendrick			
Conservative	Annette Bridges *			
Majority				
Turnout				
Labour win (new seat)				

Broom Leys
Party	Candidate	Votes	%	±%
Labour	Ronnie Adams *			
Liberal Democrats	Lesley Bowler			
Conservative	Graham Stewart			
Majority				
Turnout				
Labour win (new seat)				

Castle Donington Castle
Party	Candidate	Votes	%	±%
Independent	Tony Saffell *			
Conservative	Elliott Allman			
Labour	Derek Wintle			
Majority				
Turnout				
Independent win (new seat)				

Castle Donington Central
Party	Candidate	Votes	%	±%
Independent	Rachel Canny			
Labour Co-op	Bob Haskins			
Conservative	Caroline Large *			
Majority				
Turnout				
Independent win (new seat)				

Castle Donington Park
Party	Candidate	Votes	%	±%
Conservative	Daniel Harrison			
Labour	Mark Burton			
Independent	Robert Else			
Majority				
Turnout				
Conservative win (new seat)				

Castle Rock
Party	Candidate	Votes	%	±%
Liberal Democrats	Michael Wyatt *			
Conservative	Richard Bebbington			
Labour	Liz Clarke			
Majority				
Turnout				
Liberal Democrats win (new seat)				

Coalville East
Party	Candidate	Votes	%	±%
Conservative	John Cotterill			
UKIP	Phil Holland			
Labour	Penny Wakefield			
Liberal Democrats	Barry Wyatt			
Majority				
Turnout				
Conservative win (new seat)				

Coalville West
Party	Candidate	Votes	%	±%
Labour Co-op	John Legrys *			
Conservative	Paul Bridgen			
Liberal Democrats	Ronald Brown			
UKIP	Dave Siddon			
Majority				
Turnout				
Conservative win (new seat)				

Daleacre Hill
Party	Candidate	Votes	%	±%
Conservative	Alison Smith *			
Independent	Toni Harrington			
Labour	Carol Sewell			
Majority				
Turnout				
Conservative win (new seat)				

Ellistown and Battleflat
Party	Candidate	Votes	%	±%
Conservative	Keith Merrie			
Labour Co-op	Paul Hyde *			
UKIP	Matt Pollard			
Majority				
Turnout				
Conservative win (new seat)				

Greenhill
Party	Candidate	Votes	%	±%
Labour Co-op	Nick Clarke *			
UKIP	Simon Perrins			
Conservative	Andrew Woodman			
Liberal Democrats	David Wyatt			
Majority				
Turnout				
Labour win (new seat)				

Hermitage
Party	Candidate	Votes	%	±%
Conservative	Stuart Gillard			
Labour Co-op	Leon Spence *			
Liberal Democrats	Maureen Wyatt			
Majority				
Turnout				
Conservative win (new seat)				

Holly Hayes
Party	Candidate	Votes	%	±%
Conservative	Tony Gillard *			
Labour	Norma Burford			
Independent	Adam Halford			
Liberal Democrats	Alan Turner			
Majority				
Turnout				
Conservative win (new seat)				

Hugglescote St John's
Party	Candidate	Votes	%	±%
Labour	Russell Johnson *			
British Democrats	Graham Partner			
Conservative	Rachael Ritchie			
Liberal Democrats	Angela Windram			
Majority				
Turnout				
Labour win (new seat)				

Hugglescote St Mary's
Party	Candidate	Votes	%	±%
Labour	Terri Eynon			
Conservative	Will Jennings			
Liberal Democrats	Darren Luckman			
Majority				
Turnout				
Labour win (new seat)				

Ibstock East
Party	Candidate	Votes	%	±%
Labour	Felix Fenning			
Conservative	Mark Evans			
Liberal Democrats	Diane Reed-Barney			
UKIP	Simon Stone			
Majority				
Turnout				
Labour win (new seat)				

Ibstock West
Party	Candidate	Votes	%	±%
Conservative	John Clarke			
Labour	Janet Ruff *			
UKIP	Peter Depper			
Majority				
Turnout				
Conservative win (new seat)				

Kegworth
Party	Candidate	Votes	%	±%
Conservative	Trevor Pendleton *			
Labour	David Manley			
Green	Lindsay Richardson			
Majority				
Turnout				
Conservative win (new seat)				

Long Whatton and Diseworth
Party	Candidate	Votes	%	±%
Conservative	Nick Rushton *			
Labour Co-op	Chris Smith			
Majority				
Turnout				
Conservative win (new seat)				

Measham North
Party	Candidate	Votes	%	±%
Conservative	Jill Hoult			
Labour Co-op	Sean Sheahan *			
UKIP	Martin Green			
Majority				
Turnout				
Conservative win (new seat)				

Measham South
Party	Candidate	Votes	%	±%
Labour	Tom Neilson *			
Conservative	Stephen Hodgson			
Majority				
Turnout				
Labour win (new seat)				

Oakthorpe and Donisthorpe
Party	Candidate	Votes	%	±%
Conservative	Robert Ashman			
Labour	Laurie Andrade			
Majority				
Turnout				
Conservative win (new seat)				

Ravenstone and Packington
Party	Candidate	Votes	%	±%
Conservative	Nigel Smith *			
Labour	Tom Legrys			
UKIP	Val Pulford			
Majority				
Turnout				
Labour win (new seat)				

Sence Valley
Party	Candidate	Votes	%	±%
Conservative	Virge Richichi *			
Labour	Heather Worman			
Majority				
Turnout				
Conservative win (new seat)				

Snibston North
Party	Candidate	Votes	%	±%
Conservative	Paula Purver			
Labour	Cheslyn Baker			
Liberal Democrats	Janet Pollard			
Majority				
Turnout				
Conservative win (new seat)				

Snibston South
Party	Candidate	Votes	%	±%
Labour	John Geary *	418		
Conservative	Ted Purver	291		
UKIP	Jakob Whiten	240		
Liberal Democrats	Daniel Bowler	100		
Majority		127		
Turnout			58.32	
Labour win (new seat)				

Thornborough
Party	Candidate	Votes	%	±%
Conservative	Louise Goacher	608		
Labour	Dom McDevitt	472		
UKIP	Tim Pulford	368		
Liberal Democrats	Moira Lynch	78		
Majority		136		
Turnout			74.75	
Conservative win (new seat)				

Thringstone
Party	Candidate	Votes	%	±%
Labour	Dave Everitt *	562		
Conservative	Antony Dandy	456		
UKIP	George Norley	280		
Majority		106		
Turnout			67.45	
Labour win (new seat)				

Valley
Party	Candidate	Votes	%	±%
Conservative	Russell Boam	1045		
Labour Co-op	Gordon Tacey	369		
Liberal Democrats	Paul Tyler	181		
Majority		676		
Turnout			74.64	
Conservative win (new seat)				

Worthington and Breedon
Party	Candidate	Votes	%	±%
Conservative	David Stevenson *	1082		
Labour	Yvonne Smith	358		
UKIP	Peter Pulford	314		
Majority		724		
Turnout			77.56	
Conservative win (new seat)				
