= 2023 North West Leicestershire District Council election =

2023 English local election

2023 North West Leicestershire District Council
- 4 May 2023

All 38 seats to North West Leicestershire District Council 20 seats needed for a majority

	First party	Second party	Third party
Leader	Sean Sheahan	Richard Blunt	Michael Wyatt
Party	Labour	Conservative	Liberal Democrats
Last election	10 seats, 33.0%	20 seats, 45.1%	4 seats, 12.3%
Seats before	8	22	4
Seats after	17	12	5
Seat change	▲7	▼8	▲1
Popular vote	9,618	10,344	3,217
Percentage	37.7%	40.6%	12.6%
Swing	▲4.7%	▼4.5%	▲0.3%
	Fourth party	Fifth party
Party	Independent	Green
Last election	3 seats, 3.9%	1 seat, 1.7%
Seats before	3	1
Seats after	4	0
Seat change	▲1	▼1
Popular vote	1,645	565
Percentage	6.5%	2.2%
Swing	▲2.6%	▲0.5%
- Winner of each seat at the 2023 North West Leicestershire District Council election
Leader before election
Richard Blunt
Conservative
Leader after election
Richard Blunt
Conservative
No overall control

The 2023 North West Leicestershire District Council election took place on 4 May 2023 to elect all 38 members of North West Leicestershire District Council in Leicestershire, England. This was on the same day as other local elections across England.

== Summary ==
=== Overview ===
Following the results, the Conservatives lost the council to no overall control. Labour won most seats, but fell three seats short of a majority. An alliance of the Conservatives, Liberal Democrats and two of the independent councillors subsequently formed. With exactly half the council's seats the alliance did not have a majority either, but was able to form an administration on receiving the chair's casting vote at the annual council meeting on 22 May 2023. Conservative leader Richard Blunt therefore retained his position as leader of the council.

=== Election result ===
2023 North West Leicestershire District Council election
Party	Candidates	Seats	Gains	Losses	Net gain/loss	Seats %	Votes %	Votes	+/−
Conservative	38	12	2	10	▼8	31.6	40.6	10,344	-4.5
Labour	38	17	9	2	▲7	44.7	37.7	9,618	+4.7
Liberal Democrats	29	5	1	0	▲1	13.2	12.6	3,217	+0.3
Independent	8	4	2	1	▲1	10.5	6.5	1,645	+2.6
Green	4	0	0	1	▼1	0.0	2.2	565	+0.5
Reform	2	0	0	0	Steady	0.0	0.4	113	n/a

== Ward results ==
The results for each ward were as follows. An asterisk (*) indicates a sitting councillor standing for re-election.

=== Appleby ===
Appleby
Party	Candidate	Votes	%	±%
Conservative	Richard Blunt*	457	61.2	+2.7
Labour	Jennifer Sawyer	194	26.0	+9.5
Liberal Democrats	Rita Bradbury	96	12.9	−2.3
Turnout			37.49	
Registered electors		2,019		
Rejected ballots		9	1.2	
Conservative hold				

=== Ashby Castle ===
Ashby Castle
Party	Candidate	Votes	%	±%
Conservative	Kenny Horn	523	49.5	+6.7
Green	Carl Benfield*	397	37.6	−5.4
Labour	Alan Clark	137	13.0	−1.1
Turnout			44.55	
Registered electors		2,384		
Rejected ballots		5	0.5	
Conservative gain from Green				

=== Ashby Holywell ===
Ashby Holywell
Party	Candidate	Votes	%	±%
Labour	Avril Wilson	439	51.8	+19.3
Conservative	Roger Bayliss*	351	41.4	−11.1
Liberal Democrats	Yorick Lynch	57	6.7	−8.3
Turnout			34.28	
Registered electors		2,474		
Rejected ballots		1	0.1	
Labour gain from Conservative				

=== Ashby Ivanhoe ===
Ashby Ivanhoe
Party	Candidate	Votes	%	±%
Labour	Elizabeth Parle	426	45.0	−0.1
Conservative	Gill Hoult*	302	31.9	−23.0
Liberal Democrats	Martin Cooper	152	16.1	N/A
Green	Elisabeth Bray	66	7.0	N/A
Turnout			37.24	
Registered electors		2,554		
Rejected ballots		5	0.5	
Labour gain from Conservative				

Gill Hoult was the sitting councillor for Blackfordby prior to the election.

=== Ashby Money Hill ===
Ashby Money Hill
Party	Candidate	Votes	%	±%
Labour	Murrae Blair-Park	392	50.6	+11.1
Conservative	Dan Harrison*	340	43.9	−16.6
Reform	Gareth Bott	42	5.4	N/A
Turnout			33.93	
Registered electors		2,302		
Rejected ballots		7	0.9	
Labour gain from Conservative				

=== Ashby Willesley ===
Ashby Willesley
Party	Candidate	Votes	%	±%
Labour	David Bigby*	456	59.1	+5.6
Conservative	John Deakin	316	40.9	−5.6
Turnout			38.08	
Registered electors		2,051		
Rejected ballots		8	1.0	
Labour hold				

=== Ashby Woulds ===
Ashby Woulds
Party	Candidate	Votes	%	±%
Labour	Doug Cooper	327	54.0	+15.4
Conservative	John Bridges*	221	36.5	−24.9
Liberal Democrats	Mark Burton	57	9.4	N/A
Turnout			27.98	
Registered electors		2,180		
Rejected ballots		5	0.8	
Labour gain from Conservative				

=== Bardon ===
Bardon
Party	Candidate	Votes	%	±%
Liberal Democrats	Morgan Burke	246	42.2	−5.9
Labour	Paul Congiu	178	30.5	+12.1
Conservative	Leon Spence	159	27.3	+7.4
Turnout			25.98	
Registered electors		2,248		
Rejected ballots		1	0.2	
Liberal Democrats hold				

=== Blackfordby ===
Blackfordby
Party	Candidate	Votes	%	±%
Conservative	Andrew Woodman*	422	52.2	−1.2
Labour	Michelle Holdcroft	332	41.0	−5.6
Liberal Democrats	Rebecca Sargent	55	6.8	N/A
Turnout			33.43	
Registered electors		2,441		
Rejected ballots		6	0.7	
Conservative hold				

Andrew Woodman was the sitting councillor for Measham North prior to the election.

=== Broom Leys ===
Broom Leys
Party	Candidate	Votes	%	±%
Liberal Democrats	Lee Windram	290	38.2	+0.9
Conservative	Claire Gillard	286	37.6	−2.1
Labour	Anne Donegan	184	24.2	+1.2
Turnout			37.65	
Registered electors		2,029		
Rejected ballots		4	0.5	
Liberal Democrats gain from Conservative				

=== Castle Donington Castle ===
Castle Donington Castle
Party	Candidate	Votes	%	±%
Independent	Tony Saffell*	254	43.6	−1.7
Conservative	David John Geraint Jones (Geraint Jones)	135	23.2	−1.2
Labour	Laurie Isabel Redfern Andrade	135	23.2	−7.1
Green	Stephanie Mee	34	5.8	N/A
Liberal Democrats	Sheila Wyatt	25	4.3	N/A
Turnout			28.36	
Registered electors		2,063		
Rejected ballots		2	0.3	
Independent hold				

=== Castle Donington Central ===
Castle Donington Central
Party	Candidate	Votes	%	±%
Independent	Rachel Canny*	440	67.5	−0.6
Conservative	Jim Hoult*	114	17.5	−5.3
Labour	Orest Mulka	98	15.0	+5.9
Turnout			34.53	
Registered electors		1,897		
Rejected ballots		3	0.5	
Independent hold				

Jim Hoult was the sitting councillor for Ashby Ivanhoe prior to the election.

=== Castle Donington Park ===
Castle Donington Park
Party	Candidate	Votes	%	±%
Labour	Alison Morley	189	40.5	−13.9
Independent	Mark Rogers	144	30.8	N/A
Conservative	Roisin Spence	134	28.7	−16.9
Turnout			23.89	
Registered electors		1,980		
Rejected ballots		6	1.3	
Labour hold				

=== Castle Rock ===
Castle Rock
Party	Candidate	Votes	%	±%
Liberal Democrats	Michael Wyatt*	346	47.0	−14.7
Conservative	Kirat Sandhu	265	36.0	+12.6
Labour	Olivia Andrade	125	17.0	+2.1
Turnout			34.05	
Registered electors		2,176		
Rejected ballots		5	0.7	
Liberal Democrats hold				

=== Coalville East ===
Coalville East
Party	Candidate	Votes	%	±%
Liberal Democrats	Marie French*	229	36.8	−7.7
Labour	Carissma Griffiths	201	32.3	+7.9
Conservative	Clare Watson-Spence	193	31.0	−0.1
Turnout			31.49	
Registered electors		1,985		
Rejected ballots		2	0.3	
Liberal Democrats hold				

=== Coalville West ===
Coalville West
Party	Candidate	Votes	%	±%
Labour	John Legrys*	212	50.7	+5.7
Conservative	William Evans	77	18.4	−4.0
Liberal Democrats	Amanda Briers	69	16.5	−16.0
Independent	Zoe Howard	60	14.4	N/A
Turnout			22.44	
Registered electors		1,867		
Rejected ballots		1	0.2	
Labour hold				

=== Daleacre Hill ===
Daleacre Hill
Party	Candidate	Votes	%	±%
Labour	Carol Sewell*	328	60.7	+7.3
Conservative	Daniel Walton	144	26.7	−19.9
Green	Paul Turner	68	12.6	N/A
Turnout			28.53	
Registered electors		1,903		
Rejected ballots		3	0.6	
Labour hold				

=== Ellistown and Battleflat ===
Ellistown and Battleflat
Party	Candidate	Votes	%	±%
Conservative	Keith Merrie*	282	54.9	+7.0
Labour	Aisha Ali	156	30.4	+11.2
Liberal Democrats	Angela Windram	76	14.8	+3.5
Turnout			25.18	
Registered electors		2,049		
Rejected ballots		2	0.4	
Conservative hold				

=== Greenhill ===
Greenhill
Party	Candidate	Votes	%	±%
Liberal Democrats	Jake Windram*	221	46.0	+7.1
Labour	Ronnie Adams	163	34.0	+3.3
Conservative	Paula Purver	96	20.0	+10.4
Turnout			23.29	
Registered electors		2,095		
Rejected ballots		8	1.6	
Liberal Democrats hold				

=== Hermitage ===
Hermitage
Party	Candidate	Votes	%	±%
Labour	Anthony Barker	262	44.4	−2.3
Conservative	Stuart Gillard*	175	29.7	−23.6
Independent	Graham Partner	94	15.9	N/A
Liberal Democrats	Moira Lynch	59	10.0	N/A
Turnout			31.79	
Registered electors		1,862		
Rejected ballots		2	0.3	
Labour gain from Conservative				

=== Holly Hayes ===
Holly Hayes
Party	Candidate	Votes	%	±%
Conservative	Tony Gillard*	325	50.9	−10.7
Labour	Ian Hurst	255	39.9	+1.5
Liberal Democrats	Leah Furborough	59	9.2	N/A
Turnout			33.2	
Registered electors		1,940		
Rejected ballots		5	0.8	
Conservative hold				

=== Hugglescote St John's ===
Hugglescote St John's
Party	Candidate	Votes	%	±%
Independent	Russell Johnson*	256	34.2	−14.8
Labour	Nathan Keightley	247	33.0	−16.0
Conservative	Kevin Morrell	195	26.1	−8.8
Liberal Democrats	Dean Briers	50	6.7	−9.5
Turnout			28.18	
Registered electors		2,658		
Rejected ballots		1	0.1	
Independent gain from Labour				

Russell Johnson had been elected in 2019 as a Labour councillor, but left the party to sit as an independent earlier in 2023. Seat shown as independent gain from Labour to allowing for comparison with 2019 results.

=== Hugglescote St Mary's ===
Hugglescote St Mary's
Party	Candidate	Votes	%	±%
Labour	Terri Eynon*	342	47.4	+9.5
Conservative	Craig Smith	270	37.4	+2.8
Reform	Gaynor Watts	71	9.8	N/A
Liberal Democrats	Anthony Barney	39	5.4	−22.1
Turnout			31.57	
Registered electors		2,287		
Rejected ballots		0	0.0	
Labour hold				

=== Ibstock East ===
Ibstock East
Party	Candidate	Votes	%	±%
Conservative	Jenny Simmons*	228	47.0	+14.8
Labour	Joe Wood	198	40.8	−1.0
Liberal Democrats	Diane Reed-Barney	59	12.2	N/A
Turnout			26.12	
Registered electors		1,868		
Rejected ballots		2	0.4	
Conservative gain from Labour				

Jenny Simmons was the sitting councillor, having won the seat from Labour in a by-election in 2021. Recorded here as Conservative gain from Labour to compare with previous whole council election in 2019.

=== Ibstock West ===
Ibstock West
Party	Candidate	Votes	%	±%
Labour	Simon Lambeth	252	43.8	+8.8
Conservative	John Clarke*	244	42.4	−22.6
Liberal Democrats	George Bradbury	79	13.7	N/A
Turnout			24.59	
Registered electors		2,342		
Rejected ballots		1	0.2	
Labour gain from Conservative				

=== Kegworth ===
Kegworth
Party	Candidate	Votes	%	±%
Independent	Ray Sutton	283	45.4	N/A
Labour	John Saunders	160	25.6	−9.5
Conservative	Bertie Harrison-Rushton*	154	24.7	−40.2
Liberal Democrats	David Fletcher	27	4.3	N/A
Turnout			35.67	
Registered electors		1,758		
Rejected ballots		3	0.5	
Independent gain from Conservative				

=== Long Whatton and Diseworth ===
Long Whatton and Diseworth
Party	Candidate	Votes	%	±%
Conservative	Nick Rushton*	563	60.1	+2.8
Labour	Bob Haskins	305	32.6	−10.1
Liberal Democrats	Nicole Windram	69	7.4	N/A
Turnout			44.33	
Registered electors		2,143		
Rejected ballots		12	1.3	
Conservative hold				

=== Measham North ===
Measham North
Party	Candidate	Votes	%	±%
Conservative	Paul Lees	388	56.1	+11.0
Labour	Richard Moore	304	43.9	+8.5
Turnout			33.03	
Registered electors		2,110		
Rejected ballots		4	0.6	
Conservative hold				

=== Measham South ===
Measham South
Party	Candidate	Votes	%	±%
Labour	Sean Sheahan*	319	63.0	+18.0
Conservative	John Coxon	187	37.0	+13.0
Turnout			24.99	
Registered electors		2,065		
Rejected ballots		10	1.9	
Labour hold				

=== Oakthorpe and Donisthorpe ===
Oakthorpe and Donisthorpe
Party	Candidate	Votes	%	±%
Conservative	Mike Ball	336	53.4	−8.3
Labour	Damilola Ojuri	224	35.6	−2.7
Liberal Democrats	Susan Thorley	69	11.0	N/A
Turnout			28.54	
Registered electors		2,218		
Rejected ballots		4	0.6	
Conservative hold				

=== Ravenstone and Packington ===
Ravenstone and Packington
Party	Candidate	Votes	%	±%
Conservative	Nigel Smith*	511	55.7	−3.4
Labour	Thomas Legrys	253	27.6	+11.7
Liberal Democrats	Paris Holliday	153	16.7	−8.3
Turnout			37.32	
Registered electors		2,476		
Rejected ballots		0	0.0	
Conservative hold				

=== Sence Valley ===
Sence Valley
Party	Candidate	Votes	%	±%
Labour	Guy Rogers	338	50.8	+11.4
Conservative	Virge Richichi*	275	41.3	−19.3
Liberal Democrats	Peggy Wyatt	53	8.0	N/A
Turnout			28.63	
Registered electors		2,354		
Rejected ballots		8	1.2	
Labour gain from Conservative				

=== Snibston North ===
Snibston North
Party	Candidate	Votes	%	±%
Labour	Arthur Geary*	210	43.2	+17.2
Conservative	Elliott Allman*	157	32.3	+6.1
Liberal Democrats	David Wyatt	119	24.5	+2.2
Turnout			24.25	
Registered electors		2,012		
Rejected ballots		2	0.4	
Labour gain from Independent				

John Geary was the sitting councillor for Snibston South prior to this election. Elliott Allman had been elected as an independent in 2019 but joined the Conservatives in 2020. Seat shown as Labour gain from independent to allow comparison with 2019 results.

=== Snibston South ===
Snibston South
Party	Candidate	Votes	%	±%
Labour	June Page	225	51.8	+18.1
Liberal Democrats	Paul Holliday	133	30.6	+5.1
Conservative	Brian Beggan	76	17.5	±0.0
Turnout			22.7	
Registered electors		1,965		
Rejected ballots		11	2.5	
Labour hold				

=== Thornborough ===
Thornborough
Party	Candidate	Votes	%	±%
Labour	Peter Moult	363	46.2	+7.4
Conservative	Louise Gillard*	309	39.3	−9.6
Independent	John Smith	114	14.5	+2.2
Turnout			39.63	
Registered electors		2,011		
Rejected ballots		10	1.3	
Labour gain from Conservative				

=== Thringstone ===
Thringstone
Party	Candidate	Votes	%	±%
Labour	Dave Everitt*	289	52.5	−4.0
Conservative	Joseph Boam	226	41.1	−2.4
Liberal Democrats	Alan Turner	35	6.4	N/A
Turnout			27.48	
Registered electors		2,020		
Rejected ballots		5	0.9	
Labour hold				

=== Valley ===
Valley
Party	Candidate	Votes	%	±%
Conservative	Russell Boam*	419	54.9	−5.9
Labour	Ian Maskery	193	25.3	+5.3
Liberal Democrats	Paul Tyler	151	19.8	+0.6
Turnout			34.19	
Registered electors		2,264		
Rejected ballots		11	1.4	
Conservative hold				

=== Worthington and Breedon ===
Worthington and Breedon
Party	Candidate	Votes	%	±%
Conservative	Ray Morris*	489	58.2	−8.3
Labour	Gregory Parle	207	24.6	+6.8
Liberal Democrats	Danielle Lycett	144	17.1	+1.4
Turnout			33.86	
Registered electors		2,487		
Rejected ballots		2	0.2	
Conservative hold				

== Changes 2023–2027 ==
- In December 2024, Independent councillor Tony Saffell (Castle Donington Castle) became a member of Reform UK, while continuing to sit as an independent councillor.
- On 31 July 2026, it was reported that Conservative councillor Nick Rushton (Long Whatton & Diseworth) had died, placing the ruling Conservative/Liberal Democrat/Independent administration in a minority; a by-election followed.
- In September 2026, Conservative councillor Russell Boam (Valley) left the party to sit as an independent.

== By-elections ==
=== Snibston South ===
The by-election was triggered by the resignation of Labour councillor June Page.

Snibston South: 2 May 2024
Party	Candidate	Votes	%	±%
Labour	Catherine Beck	222	51.3	−0.5
Independent	Dan Roberts	121	27.9	New
Liberal Democrats	Paul Holliday	71	16.4	−14.2
Green	Greg Simpson	19	4.4	New
Majority		101	23.4	N/A
Turnout		434	21.6	−1.1
Labour hold		Swing	N/A	

=== Long Whatton & Diseworth ===
The by-election was triggered by the death of Conservative councillor Nick Rushton.

Long Whatton & Diseworth: 1 October 2026
Party	Candidate	Votes	%	±%
Conservative	Craig Smith	576	55.5	−4.6
Reform	Charles Pugsley	204	19.7	N/A
Labour	Damilola Ojuri	147	14.2	−18.4
Restore	Simon Tunnicliffe	55	5.3	N/A
Green	Drew Timms	34	3.3	N/A
Liberal Democrats	Ian Bradley	22	2.1	−5.2
Majority		372	35.8	+10.3
Turnout		1040	50.8	+6.5
Conservative hold		Swing		

== See also ==
- North West Leicestershire District Council elections
