= Swepstone =

Village in Leicestershire, England

Coordinates: 52.693292°N 1.45498°W

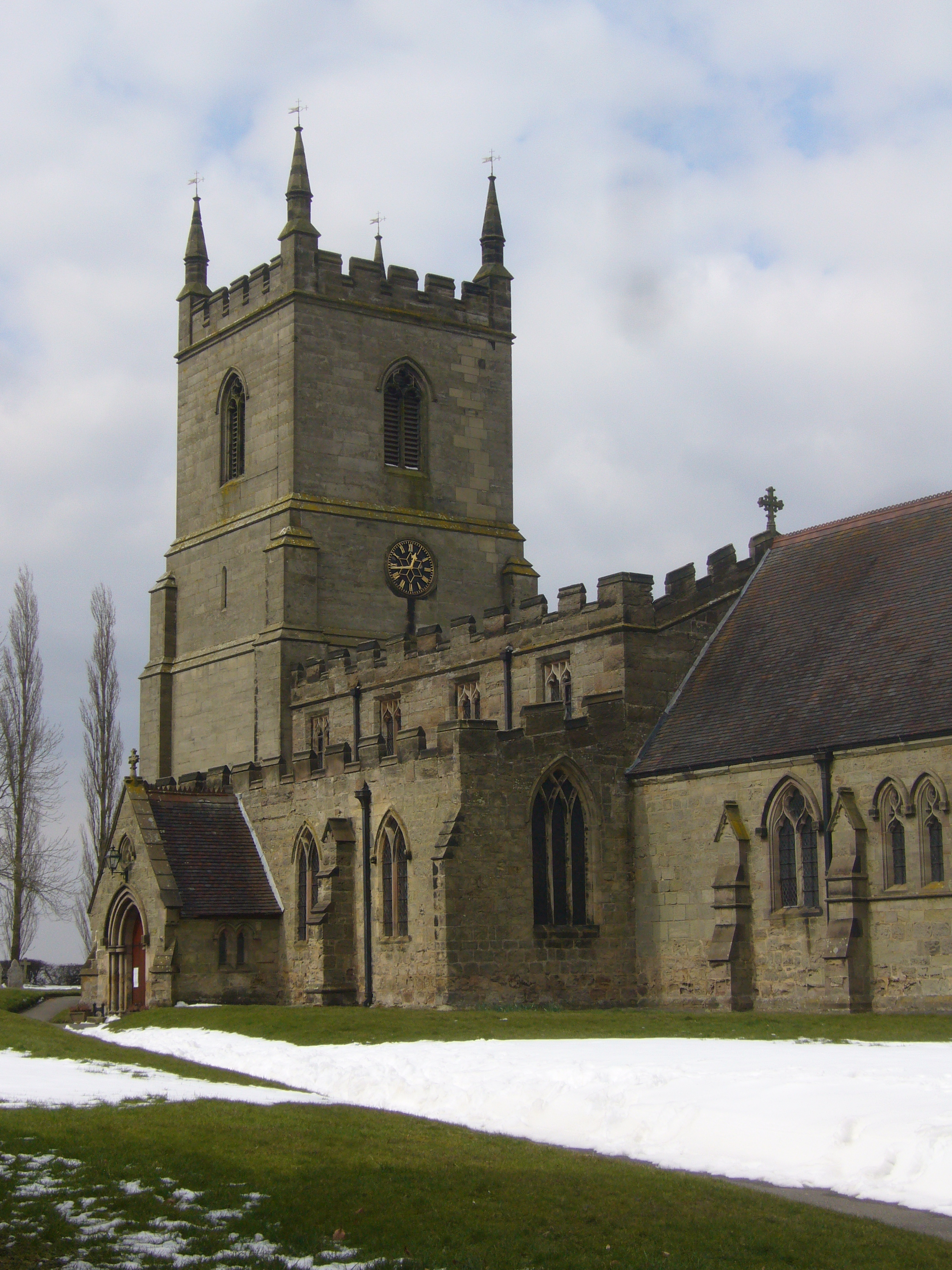
- Saint Peter's Church, Swepstone

- Location within Leicestershire
- Population: 656 (2011)
- OS grid reference: SK 37083 10771
  - London: 172 km
- Civil parish: Swepstone and Newton Burgoland
- District: North West Leicestershire
- Shire county: Leicestershire
- Region: East Midlands
- Country: England
- Sovereign state: United Kingdom
- Post town: COALVILLE
- Postcode district: LE67
- Dialling code: 01530
- Police: Leicestershire
- Fire: Leicestershire
- Ambulance: East Midlands
- UK Parliament: Hinckley and Bosworth

Swepstone is a village in the civil parish of Swepstone and Newton Burgoland, in the North West Leicestershire district of Leicestershire, England, about five miles south of Ashby de la Zouch. The population of the civil parish at the 2011 census 656. The parish includes the villages of Swepstone and Newton Burgoland. On 1 March 2023 the parish was renamed from "Swepstone" to "Swepstone and Newton Burgoland".

The earliest documentation of the village is found in the Domesday Book where it appears as Scopestone. Later documentary appearances are given as Swepeston from around 1130 to 1471, and Swepston from 1234. The name is probably derived from the Old English personal name Sweppes, and the suffix tūn, meaning "Sweppi's farm or village".

Swepstone farmers regularly sold their cattle in local market towns. In 1597 three Swepstone farmers, Richard Dudley, William Chilwell and Thomas Burrows were called to give evidence in an archdeaconry court case. It is recorded that the three were drinking together in an alehouse near the market square in Atherstone while their beasts were tethered outside.

Swepstone's only public house is The Old Crown Inn, previously known as The Odd House, which serves food.

Planting of The National Forest is taking place near the village.
