= 2019 North West Leicestershire District Council election =

2019 UK local government election

- 2 May 2019

All 38 seats to North West Leicestershire District Council 20 seats needed for a majority
- Turnout: 31.75% (Note: Calculated from the 25,273 ballot papers issued and 79,612 registered electors recorded across the 38 wards; see the ward-by-ward results below.)

	First party	Second party	Third party
Party	Conservative	Labour	Liberal Democrats
Last election	25 seats, 46.9%	10 seats, 34.2%	1 seat, 6.4%
Seats won	20	10	4
Seat change	▼5	Steady	▲3
Popular vote	11,072	8,116	3,032
Percentage	45.1%	33.0%	12.3%
Swing	▼1.8%	▼1.2%	▲5.9%
	Fourth party	Fifth party
Party	Independent	Green
Last election	2 seats, 4.1%	0 seats, 0.3%
Seats won	3	1
Seat change	▲1	▲1
Popular vote	948	429
Percentage	3.9%	1.7%
Swing	▼0.2%	▲1.4%
- Results map of the election
Council control before election
Conservative
Council control after election
Conservative

The 2019 North West Leicestershire District Council election was held on 2 May 2019 to elect all 38 members of North West Leicestershire District Council in Leicestershire, England, as part of that year's local elections across England.

The Conservative Party retained control of the council but with a reduced majority, losing five seats to finish with 20 of the 38 seats. The Labour Party held its ten seats, while the Liberal Democrats made the largest gains of the election, more than trebling their representation from one seat to four. The Green Party won its first seat on the council, and independent candidates increased their representation from two seats to three.

== Summary ==
=== Election result ===
2019 North West Leicestershire District Council election
Party	Candidates	Seats	Gains	Losses	Net gain/loss	Seats %	Votes %	Votes	+/−
Conservative	38	20	2	7	▼5	52.6	45.1	11,072	–1.8
Labour	38	10	3	3	Steady	26.3	33.0	8,116	–1.2
Liberal Democrats	16	4	3	0	▲3	10.5	12.3	3,032	+5.9
Independent	4	3	1	0	▲1	7.9	3.9	948	–0.2
Green	1	1	1	0	▲1	2.6	1.7	429	+1.4
UKIP	6	0	0	0	Steady	0.0	3.3	805	–4.5
Libertarian	1	0	0	0	Steady	0.0	0.3	83	N/A
Monster Raving Loony	1	0	0	0	Steady	0.0	0.3	76	N/A

== Ward results ==
=== Appleby ===
Appleby
Party	Candidate	Votes	%	±%
Conservative	Richard Blunt	451	58.5	
Labour	Joe Wain	127	16.5	
Liberal Democrats	David Wyatt	117	15.2	
Monster Raving Loony	Colin Roberts	76	9.9	
Majority				
Turnout		778	39.29	
Rejected ballots		7	0.9	
Registered electors		1,980		
Conservative hold		Swing		

=== Ashby Castle ===
Ashby Castle
Party	Candidate	Votes	%	±%
Green	Carl Benfield	429	43.0	
Conservative	John Coxon	427	42.8	
Labour	Paul Montgomery	141	14.1	
Majority				
Turnout		1,008	40.69	
Rejected ballots		11	1.1	
Registered electors		2,477		
Green gain from Conservative		Swing		

=== Ashby Holywell ===
Ashby Holywell
Party	Candidate	Votes	%	±%
Conservative	Roger Bayliss	379	52.5	
Labour	Doug Cooper	235	32.5	
Liberal Democrats	Maxine Sedgwick	108	15.0	
Majority				
Turnout		749	35.48	
Rejected ballots		24	3.2	
Registered electors		2,111		
Conservative hold		Swing		

=== Ashby Ivanhoe ===
Ashby Ivanhoe
Party	Candidate	Votes	%	±%
Conservative	Jim Hoult	450	54.9	
Labour	Elaine Robinson	370	45.1	
Majority				
Turnout		845	36.03	
Rejected ballots		25	3.0	
Registered electors		2,345		
Conservative hold		Swing		

=== Ashby Money Hill ===
Ashby Money Hill
Party	Candidate	Votes	%	±%
Conservative	Daniel Harrison	375	60.5	
Labour	Avril Wilson	245	39.5	
Majority				
Turnout		646	29.35	
Rejected ballots		26	4.0	
Registered electors		2,201		
Conservative hold		Swing		

=== Ashby Willesley ===
Ashby Willesley
Party	Candidate	Votes	%	±%
Labour	Dave Bigby	424	53.5	
Conservative	David Jones	368	46.5	
Majority				
Turnout		830	39.54	
Rejected ballots		38	4.6	
Registered electors		2,099		
Labour gain from Conservative		Swing		

=== Ashby Woulds ===
Ashby Woulds
Party	Candidate	Votes	%	±%
Conservative	John Bridges	339	61.4	
Labour	Anne Donegan	213	38.6	
Majority				
Turnout		582	27.67	
Rejected ballots		30	5.2	
Registered electors		2,103		
Conservative hold		Swing		

=== Bardon ===
Bardon
Party	Candidate	Votes	%	±%
Liberal Democrats	Angela Black	295	48.1	
Conservative	Mick Specht	122	19.9	
Labour	Nick Clarke	113	18.4	
Libertarian	Dan Liddicott	83	13.5	
Majority				
Turnout		626	27.67	
Rejected ballots		13	2.1	
Registered electors		2,262		
Liberal Democrats gain from Conservative		Swing		

=== Blackfordby ===
Blackfordby
Party	Candidate	Votes	%	±%
Conservative	Hill Hoult	361	53.4	
Labour	Kath Lauro	315	46.6	
Majority				
Turnout		705	31.03	
Rejected ballots		29	4.1	
Registered electors		2,272		
Conservative gain from Labour		Swing		

=== Broom Leys ===
Broom Leys
Party	Candidate	Votes	%	±%
Conservative	Alexander Bridgen	366	39.7	
Liberal Democrats	Lee Windram	344	37.3	
Labour	Anthony Barker	212	23.0	
Majority				
Turnout		945	44.10	
Rejected ballots		24	2.5	
Registered electors		2,143		
Conservative gain from Labour		Swing		

=== Castle Donington Castle ===
Castle Donington Castle
Party	Candidate	Votes	%	±%
Independent	Tony Saffell	288	45.3	
Labour Co-op	Ray Sutton	193	30.3	
Conservative	Leon Spence	155	24.4	
Majority				
Turnout		658	30.63	
Rejected ballots		22	3.3	
Registered electors		2,148		
Independent hold		Swing		

=== Castle Donington Central ===
Castle Donington Central
Party	Candidate	Votes	%	±%
Independent	Rachel Canny	435	68.1	
Conservative	Lisa Collins	146	22.8	
Labour	Dan Green	58	9.1	
Majority				
Turnout		652	32.91	
Rejected ballots		13	2.0	
Registered electors		1,981		
Independent hold		Swing		

=== Castle Donington Park ===
Castle Donington Park
Party	Candidate	Votes	%	±%
Labour	Michael Hay	190	54.4	
Conservative	Leigh Brothwell	159	45.6	
Majority				
Turnout		374	25.20	
Rejected ballots		25	6.7	
Registered electors		1,484		
Labour gain from Conservative		Swing		

=== Castle Rock ===
Castle Rock
Party	Candidate	Votes	%	±%
Liberal Democrats	Michael Wyatt	432	61.7	
Conservative	Paula Purver	164	23.4	
Labour	Olivia Andrade	104	14.9	
Majority				
Turnout		716	34.49	
Rejected ballots		17	2.4	
Registered electors		2,076		
Liberal Democrats hold		Swing		

=== Coalville East ===
Coalville East
Party	Candidate	Votes	%	±%
Liberal Democrats	Marie French	286	44.5	
Conservative	Ronald Cotterill	200	31.1	
Labour	Elijah Bennett	157	24.4	
Majority				
Turnout		647	30.75	
Rejected ballots		4	0.6	
Registered electors		2,104		
Liberal Democrats gain from Conservative		Swing		

=== Coalville West ===
Coalville West
Party	Candidate	Votes	%	±%
Labour Co-op	John Legrys	209	45.0	
Liberal Democrats	Moira Lynch	151	32.5	
Conservative	Mary Tuckey	104	22.4	
Majority				
Turnout		472	23.92	
Rejected ballots		8	1.7	
Registered electors		1,973		
Labour hold		Swing		

=== Daleacre ===
Daleacre
Party	Candidate	Votes	%	±%
Labour	Carol Sewell	305	53.4	
Conservative	Clare Watson-Spence	266	46.6	
Majority				
Turnout		590	32.36	
Rejected ballots		19	3.2	
Registered electors		1,823		
Labour gain from Conservative		Swing		

=== Ellistown and Battleflat ===
Ellistown and Battleflat
Party	Candidate	Votes	%	±%
Conservative	Keith Merrie	272	47.9	
UKIP	Matthew Pollard	123	21.7	
Labour	Martin Walton	109	19.2	
Liberal Democrats	Sheila Wyatt	64	11.3	
Majority				
Turnout		576	27.83	
Rejected ballots		8	1.4	
Registered electors		2,070		
Conservative hold		Swing		

=== Greenhill ===
Greenhill
Party	Candidate	Votes	%	±%
Liberal Democrats	Jake Windram	232	38.9	
Labour	Ron Adams	183	30.7	
UKIP	Benny Wileman	124	20.8	
Conservative	Robert Bradley	57	9.6	
Majority				
Turnout		605	27.33	
Rejected ballots		9	1.5	
Registered electors		2,214		
Liberal Democrats gain from Labour		Swing		

=== Hermitage ===
Hermitage
Party	Candidate	Votes	%	±%
Conservative	Stuart Gillard	277	53.3	
Labour	Peter Moult	243	46.7	
Majority				
Turnout		541	28.87	
Rejected ballots		21	3.9	
Registered electors		1,874		
Conservative hold		Swing		

=== Holly Hayes ===
Holly Hayes
Party	Candidate	Votes	%	±%
Conservative	Tony Gillard	421	61.6	
Labour	Alison Andrade	262	38.4	
Majority				
Turnout		709	34.72	
Rejected ballots		26	3.7	
Registered electors		2,042		
Conservative hold		Swing		

=== Hugglescote St. John's ===
Hugglescote St. John's
Party	Candidate	Votes	%	±%
Labour	Russell Johnson	236	49.0	
Conservative	Vicki Boam	168	34.9	
Liberal Democrats	Aaron Windram	78	16.2	
Majority				
Turnout		502	31.59	
Rejected ballots		20	4.0	
Registered electors		1,589		
Labour hold		Swing		

=== Hugglescote St. Mary's ===
Hugglescote St. Mary's
Party	Candidate	Votes	%	±%
Labour Co-op	Terri Eynon	243	37.9	
Conservative	Will Jennings	222	34.6	
Liberal Democrats	James Hemsley	176	27.5	
Majority				
Turnout		657	29.25	
Rejected ballots		16	2.4	
Registered electors		2,246		
Labour Co-op hold		Swing		

=== Ibstock East ===
Ibstock East
Party	Candidate	Votes	%	±%
Labour	Daniel Tebbutt	222	41.8	
Conservative	Pamela Spence	171	32.2	
UKIP	George Norley	138	26.0	
Majority				
Turnout		539	27.74	
Rejected ballots		8	1.5	
Registered electors		1,943		
Labour hold		Swing		

=== Ibstock West ===
Ibstock West
Party	Candidate	Votes	%	±%
Conservative	John Clarke	361	65.0	
Labour	Jim Roberts	194	35.0	
Majority				
Turnout		579	25.81	
Rejected ballots		24	4.1	
Registered electors		2,243		
Conservative hold		Swing		

=== Kegworth ===
Kegworth
Party	Candidate	Votes	%	±%
Conservative	Bertie Rushton	340	64.9	
Labour	David Manley	184	35.1	
Majority				
Turnout		562	31.52	
Rejected ballots		38	6.8	
Registered electors		1,783		
Conservative hold		Swing		

=== Long Whatton and Diseworth ===
Long Whatton and Diseworth
Party	Candidate	Votes	%	±%
Conservative	Nicholas Rushton	482	57.3	
Labour	Anna Champneys	359	42.7	
Majority				
Turnout		865	40.38	
Rejected ballots		24	2.8	
Registered electors		2,142		
Conservative hold		Swing		

=== Measham North ===
Measham North
Party	Candidate	Votes	%	±%
Conservative	Andrew Woodman	242	45.1	
Labour Co-op	Laurie Andrade	190	35.4	
UKIP	Angela Ross	105	19.6	
Majority				
Turnout		540	26.73	
Rejected ballots		3	0.6	
Registered electors		2,020		
Conservative hold		Swing		

=== Measham South ===
Measham South
Party	Candidate	Votes	%	±%
Labour Co-op	Sean Sheahan	281	45.0	
UKIP	Karen Lott	193	30.9	
Conservative	Annette Bridges	150	24.0	
Majority				
Turnout		630	29.80	
Rejected ballots		6	1.0	
Registered electors		2,114		
Labour Co-op hold		Swing		

=== Oakthorpe and Donisthorpe ===
Oakthorpe and Donisthorpe
Party	Candidate	Votes	%	±%
Conservative	Robert Ashman	338	61.7	
Labour	Richard Dyason	210	38.3	
Majority				
Turnout		574	26.86	
Rejected ballots		24	4.2	
Registered electors		2,137		
Conservative hold		Swing		

=== Ravenstone and Packington ===
Ravenstone and Packington
Party	Candidate	Votes	%	±%
Conservative	Nigel Smith	510	59.1	
Liberal Democrats	David Holliday	216	25.0	
Labour	Kathleen Timberley	137	15.9	
Majority				
Turnout		885	37.50	
Rejected ballots		22	2.5	
Registered electors		2,360		
Conservative hold		Swing		

=== Sence Valley ===
Sence Valley
Party	Candidate	Votes	%	±%
Conservative	Virge Richichi	369	60.6	
Labour	Rupert Knapton	240	39.4	
Majority				
Turnout		630	26.42	
Rejected ballots		21	3.3	
Registered electors		2,385		
Conservative hold		Swing		

=== Snibston North ===
Snibston North
Party	Candidate	Votes	%	±%
Independent	Elliott Allman	134	26.2	
Labour	Fliss Middleton	133	26.0	
Conservative	Hope Brothwell	130	25.4	
Liberal Democrats	Vivienne Brooks	114	22.3	
Majority				
Turnout		515	25.09	
Rejected ballots		4	0.8	
Registered electors		2,053		
Independent gain from Conservative		Swing		

=== Snibston South ===
Snibston South
Party	Candidate	Votes	%	±%
Labour	John Geary	177	33.7	
Liberal Democrats	Jack Coleman	134	25.5	
UKIP	Paul Martin	122	23.2	
Conservative	Paul Spence	92	17.5	
Majority				
Turnout		530	26.77	
Rejected ballots		5	0.9	
Registered electors		1,980		
Labour hold		Swing		

=== Thornborough ===
Thornborough
Party	Candidate	Votes	%	±%
Conservative	Louise Gillard	362	48.9	
Labour	Ray Woodward	287	38.8	
Independent	John Smith	91	12.3	
Majority				
Turnout		761	36.26	
Rejected ballots		21	2.8	
Registered electors		2,099		
Conservative hold		Swing		

=== Thringstone ===
Thringstone
Party	Candidate	Votes	%	±%
Labour	Dave Everitt	307	56.5	
Conservative	Mark Evans	236	43.5	
Majority				
Turnout		574	27.27	
Rejected ballots		31	5.4	
Registered electors		2,105		
Labour hold		Swing		

=== Valley ===
Valley
Party	Candidate	Votes	%	±%
Conservative	Russell Boam	490	60.8	
Labour	Paul Cudby	161	20.0	
Liberal Democrats	Paul Tyler	155	19.2	
Majority				
Turnout		830	36.89	
Rejected ballots		24	2.9	
Registered electors		2,250		
Conservative hold		Swing		

=== Worthington and Breedon ===
Worthington and Breedon
Party	Candidate	Votes	%	±%
Conservative	David Stevenson	550	66.5	
Labour	Gregory Parle	147	17.8	
Liberal Democrats	Alan Turner	130	15.7	
Majority				
Turnout		846	35.53	
Rejected ballots		19	2.2	
Registered electors		2,381		
Conservative hold		Swing		

== Changes 2019–2023 ==
Elliott Allman, elected as an independent in Snibston North ward, joined the Conservatives in 2020.

Ibstock East By-Election, 6 May 2021
Party	Candidate	Votes	%	±%
Conservative	Jenny Simmons	355	57.8	+25.6
Labour	Carissma Griffiths	164	26.7	−15.1
Liberal Democrats	David Wyatt	54	8.8	+8.8
Green	Liz Fletcher	41	6.7	+6.7
Majority		191	31.1	
Turnout		614		
Conservative gain from Labour		Swing		

Worthington and Breedon By-Election, 6 May 2021
Party	Candidate	Votes	%	±%
Conservative	Raymond Morris	696	69.7	+3.2
Labour	Gregory Parle	139	13.9	−3.9
Green	Gareth Shilton	104	10.4	+10.4
Liberal Democrats	Paul Tyler	60	6.0	−9.7
Majority		557	55.8	
Turnout		999		
Conservative hold		Swing		

Russell Johnson, elected as a Labour councillor in Hugglestone St John's ward, left the party to sit as an independent early in 2023.
