= Chilcote =

Village and civil parish in England

Coordinates: 52.700°N 1.579°W

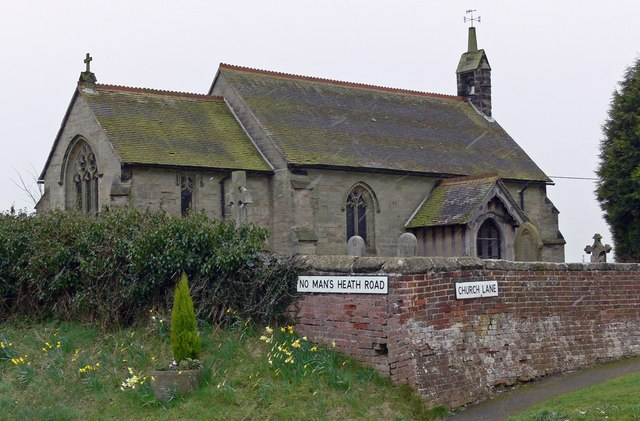
- Chilcote Parish Church

- Location within Leicestershire
- Population: 200 (2011 Census)
- Civil parish: Chilcote
- District: North West Leicestershire
- Shire county: Leicestershire
- Region: East Midlands
- Country: England
- Sovereign state: United Kingdom
- Post town: SWADLINCOTE
- Postcode district: DE12
- Dialling code: 01283
- Police: Leicestershire
- Fire: Leicestershire
- Ambulance: East Midlands
- UK Parliament: Hinckley and Bosworth

Chilcote is a village and civil parish in the North West Leicestershire district of Leicestershire, England. Until 1897 it was in Derbyshire. The parish had a population of 108 according to the 2001 census, including Stretton-en-le-Field and increasing to 200 at the 2011 census.

The village's name means 'the cottages of the children'.

Chilcote lies close to the borders of Derbyshire (to the north), Staffordshire (to the west), and Warwickshire (to the south). Roads from the village only lead to Derbyshire and Warwickshire. It is therefore not possible to travel by road from Chilcote to any other part of Leicestershire without first leaving the county.

Chilcote also plays host to an almost unique geographic phenomenon within the UK, in that its parent county, Leicestershire, borders neighbouring Staffordshire directly over a distance of only about a mile. The boundary is accessible to pedestrians and within easy walking distance of the village centre. There is only one other example in UK of a county boundary this short, and the geography makes it possible to complete a local walk on public rights of way taking in four different counties in under two hours.
