= 2011 North West Leicestershire District Council election =

2011 UK local government election

Elections to the North West Leicestershire District Council took place on 5 May 2011, in line with other local elections in the United Kingdom. A total of 38 councillors were elected from 20 wards as the whole council was up for election.

The Conservatives held control of the council after winning it in a landslide at the previous election. The Labour Party failed to retake control of the council but made significant gains at the expense of the Conservatives, who lost 6 councillors, the Liberal Democrats, who lost 2 councillors, the BNP, who lost both of their councillors, and one Independent.

== Results ==
A map of North West Leicestershire coloured by victorious party at the 2011 District Council election.

North West Leicestershire District Council election, 2011
Party	Seats	Gains	Losses	Net gain/loss	Seats %	Votes %	Votes	+/−
Conservative	21	0	6	−6	55.3	46.5	27,214	+1.2
Labour	16	11	0	+11	42.1	38.7	22,632	+7.3
Liberal Democrats	1	0	2	−2	2.6	8.8	5,149	−5.6
Independent	0	0	1	−1	0.0	4.2	2,475	+1.0
BNP	0	0	2	−2	0.0	1.1	616	−3.8
Green	0	0	0	±0	0.0	0.7	404	New

== Ward results ==
In wards that are represented by more than one councillor, electors were given more than one vote each, hence the voter turnout may not match the number of votes cast.

=== Appleby ===
Appleby (1 seat)
Party	Candidate	Votes	%	±%
Conservative	Richard Blunt	620	56.3	−21.2
Independent	Colin Roberts	302	27.4	N/A
Labour Co-op	Gordon Tacey	179	16.3	−6.2
Turnout		1,101	62.2	
Conservative hold		Swing		

=== Ashby Castle ===
Ashby Castle (1 seat)
Party	Candidate	Votes	%	±%
Conservative	John Geoffrey Coxon	810	71.5	+5.0
Labour	Gerry Pointon	323	28.5	+11.0
Turnout		1,133	55.4	
Conservative hold		Swing		

=== Ashby Holywell ===
Ashby Holywell (2 seats)
Party	Candidate	Votes	%	±%
Conservative	Roger David Bayliss	907	29.7	+4.1
Conservative	Graham Arthur Allman	817	26.8	+4.5
Labour	Eric Avins	679	22.2	+7.5
Labour	Stephen Whetton	650	21.3	+7.9
Turnout		1,527	43.8	
Conservative hold		Swing		
Conservative hold		Swing		

Ward summary
Party	Votes	% Votes	±%	Seats	Change
Conservative	1,724	56.5	+8.6	2	
Labour	1,329	43.5	+15.4	0	
Total Votes Cast	3,053				

=== Ashby Ivanhoe ===
Ashby Ivanhoe (2 seats)
Party	Candidate	Votes	%	±%
Conservative	James Hoult	952	28.2	−0.4
Conservative	Geraint Jones	929	27.5	−0.4
Labour	Mick Newborough	784	23.2	+4.1
Labour	David Whetton	714	21.1	+5.1
Turnout		1,690	49.3	
Conservative hold		Swing		
Conservative hold		Swing		

Ward summary
Party	Votes	% Votes	±%	Seats	Change
Conservative	1,881	55.7	−0.8	2	
Labour	1,498	44.3	+9.2	0	
Total Votes Cast	3,379				

=== Bardon ===
Bardon (1 seat)
Party	Candidate	Votes	%	±%
Conservative	Michael Specht	296	33.4	−23.7
Liberal Democrats	David Wyatt	276	31.2	+13.3
Labour	Rodney Storer	244	27.6	+2.6
Green	Sue Morrell	69	7.8	N/A
Turnout		885	36.9	
Conservative hold		Swing		

=== Breedon ===
Breedon (1 seat)
Party	Candidate	Votes	%	±%
Conservative	Nicholas James Rushton	568	52.3	−27.9
Independent	Barry Webster	293	27.0	N/A
Labour	Laurie Andrade	163	15.0	−4.8
Liberal Democrats	Shane Bowler	62	5.7	N/A
Turnout		1,086	54.6	
Conservative hold		Swing		

=== Castle Donington ===
Castle Donington (3 seats)
Party	Candidate	Votes	%	±%
Conservative	Tony Saffell	1,310	20.9	−1.5
Conservative	Caroline Large	1,120	17.9	−6.6
Conservative	Charles Meynell	1,051	16.8	−2.8
Labour	Derek Wintle	993	15.9	+2.7
Labour	Patrick Lynch	881	14.1	+1.8
Labour	Robert Haskins	626	10.0	+2.0
Liberal Democrats	Alan Turner	278	4.4	N/A
Turnout		2,087	44.0	
Conservative hold		Swing		
Conservative hold		Swing		
Conservative hold		Swing		

Ward summary
Party	Votes	% Votes	±%	Seats	Change
Conservative	3,481	55.6	−10.9	3	
Labour	2,500	39.9	+6.4	0	
Liberal Democrats	278	4.4	N/A	0	
Total Votes Cast	6,259				

=== Coalville ===
Coalville (2 seats)
Party	Candidate	Votes	%	±%
Labour	John Legrys	665	26.3	+2.9
Labour	Pam Clayfield	595	23.6	N/A
Conservative	Paul Bridgen	371	14.7	−0.5
Independent	Philip Holland	370	14.7	−9.1
Conservative	Leah Miller	301	11.9	−3.1
Independent	Ann Edwards	222	8.8	N/A
Turnout		1,262	35.3	
Labour gain from Independent		Swing		
Labour hold		Swing		

Ward summary
Party	Votes	% Votes	±%	Seats	Change
Labour	1,260	49.9	+26.5	2	+1
Conservative	672	26.6	−3.6	0	
Independent	592	23.5	−0.3	0	−1
Total Votes Cast	2,524				

=== Greenhill ===
Greenhill (3 seats)
Party	Candidate	Votes	%	±%
Labour	Ronnie Adams	800	12.9	+3.3
Liberal Democrats	Michael Barry Wyatt	783	12.7	−1.2
Labour	Nick Clarke	763	12.3	+3.7
Labour	Dave De Lacy	674	10.9	+3.4
Conservative	Gillian Hoult	611	9.9	+2.4
Liberal Democrats	Lesley Bowler	557	9.0	−2.4
Liberal Democrats	Julie Anne Roberts	546	8.8	−3.1
Conservative	John Turnbull Kailofer	533	8.6	+1.8
Conservative	Mary Tuckey	533	8.6	+1.1
Green	Terry Morrell	216	3.5	N/A
Independent	Jim Collins	174	2.8	N/A
Turnout		2,091	43.9	
Labour gain from Liberal Democrats		Swing		
Liberal Democrats hold		Swing		
Labour gain from Liberal Democrats		Swing		

Ward summary
Party	Votes	% Votes	±%	Seats	Change
Labour	2,237	36.1	+10.4	2	+2
Liberal Democrats	1,886	30.5	−6.7	1	−2
Conservative	1,677	27.1	+5.4	0	
Green	216	3.5	N/A	0	
Independent	174	2.8	−4.3	0	
Total Votes Cast	6,190				

=== Hugglescote ===
Hugglescote (2 seats)
Party	Candidate	Votes	%	±%
Labour	Paul Anthony Hyde	484	18.3	+6.5
Conservative	John Cotterill	440	16.7	+2.0
Labour	Lauren Otter	437	16.5	+3.8
Conservative	Matthew Pollard	331	12.5	+2.1
Independent	Graham Partner	270	10.2	−5.9
Independent	Steve Palmer	252	9.5	N/A
Independent	Alan Gamble	172	6.5	N/A
Green	Penny Wakefield	119	4.5	N/A
Liberal Democrats	Nigel Adcock	74	2.8	−7.0
Liberal Democrats	Jamie Dennis	62	2.3	−7.3
Turnout		1,321	41.8	
Labour gain from BNP		Swing		
Conservative hold		Swing		

Ward summary
Party	Votes	% Votes	±%	Seats	Change
Labour	921	34.9	+10.3	1	+1
Conservative	771	29.2	+4.1	1	
Independent	694	26.3	+11.5	0	−1
Liberal Democrats	136	5.1	−14.3	0	
Green	119	4.5	N/A	0	
Total Votes Cast	2,641				

=== Ibstock and Heather ===
Ibstock and Heather (3 seats)
Party	Candidate	Votes	%	±%
Conservative	Virge Richichi	970	17.8	+2.5
Labour	Stacy Harris	748	13.7	−1.0
Labour	Janet Ruff	693	12.7	−0.2
Labour	Gerald Wilkinson	685	12.6	+1.0
Conservative	Neville Drury	648	11.9	−3.3
Conservative	Colin Tracey	612	11.2	−1.3
Independent	Ivan Hammonds	420	7.7	N/A
Liberal Democrats	Kim Wyatt	355	6.5	+1.8
Liberal Democrats	Barrie Catchpole	161	3.0	−1.6
Liberal Democrats	Darren Finney	156	2.9	N/A
Turnout		1,604	40.1	
Conservative hold		Swing		
Labour gain from Conservative		Swing		
Labour hold		Swing		

Ward summary
Party	Votes	% Votes	±%	Seats	Change
Conservative	2,230	40.9	−2.1	1	−1
Labour	2,126	39.0	−0.2	2	+1
Liberal Democrats	672	12.3	+3.0	0	
Independent	694	7.7	−0.8	0	
Total Votes Cast	4,811				

=== Kegworth and Whatton ===
Kegworth and Whatton (2 seats)
Party	Candidate	Votes	%	±%
Conservative	Trevor Pendleton	1,111	45.4	−1.1
Conservative	Alison Smith	761	31.1	−2.8
Labour Co-op	Christopher Smith	576	23.5	+3.9
Turnout		1,224	47.4	
Conservative hold		Swing		
Conservative hold		Swing		

Ward summary
Party	Votes	% Votes	±%	Seats	Change
Conservative	1,872	76.5	−3.9	2	
Labour	576	23.5	+3.9	0	
Total Votes Cast	2,174				

=== Measham ===
Measham (2 seats)
Party	Candidate	Votes	%	±%
Labour	Tom Neilson	732	28.6	+8.0
Labour	Sean David Sheahan	691	27.0	+5.9
Conservative	Christopher Keeley	574	22.4	−1.7
Conservative	Jason Summerfield	565	22.0	−1.6
Turnout		1,281	38.3	
Labour gain from Conservative		Swing		
Labour gain from Conservative		Swing		

Ward summary
Party	Votes	% Votes	±%	Seats	Change
Labour	1,423	55.5	+13.8	2	+2
Conservative	1,139	44.5	−3.2	0	−2
Total Votes Cast	2,562				

=== Moira ===
Moira (2 seats)
Party	Candidate	Votes	%	±%
Conservative	Annette Bridges	872	27.1	−0.8
Conservative	John Bridges	841	26.1	−0.4
Labour	John Perry	788	24.5	+1.7
Labour	Jim Roberts	719	22.3	−0.5
Turnout		1,610	46.6	
Conservative hold		Swing		
Conservative hold		Swing		

Ward summary
Party	Votes	% Votes	±%	Seats	Change
Conservative	1,713	53.2	−1.2	2	
Labour	1,507	46.8	+1.2	0	
Total Votes Cast	3,220				

=== Oakthorpe and Donisthorpe ===
Oakthorpe and Donisthorpe (1 seat)
Party	Candidate	Votes	%	±%
Labour	Lesley Massey	443	47.9	+2.9
Conservative	Jackie Bridgen	401	43.4	−11.6
Liberal Democrats	Heather Fox	81	8.8	N/A
Turnout		925	46.6	
Labour gain from Conservative		Swing		

=== Ravenstone and Packington ===
Ravenstone and Packington (1 seat)
Party	Candidate	Votes	%	±%
Conservative	Nigel Smith	739	68.8	+18.8
Labour	Tom Legrys	249	23.2	+5.9
Liberal Democrats	Barry Wyatt	86	8.0	N/A
Turnout		1,074	54.3	
Conservative hold		Swing		

=== Snibston ===
Snibston (2 seats)
Party	Candidate	Votes	%	±%
Labour	John Geary	617	22.5	+2.3
Labour	Russell Johnson	615	22.4	+2.0
Conservative	Paula Diane Purver	534	19.5	−5.4
Conservative	Christopher Timmis	447	16.3	−5.6
Liberal Democrats	Diane Reed Barney	284	10.3	−2.3
Liberal Democrats	Lee Windram	246	9.0	N/A
Turnout		1,372	37.1	
Labour gain from Conservative		Swing		
Labour gain from Conservative		Swing		

Ward summary
Party	Votes	% Votes	±%	Seats	Change
Labour	1,232	44.9	+4.4	2	+2
Conservative	981	35.8	−11.1	0	−2
Liberal Democrats	530	19.3	+6.7	0	
Total Votes Cast	2,743				

=== Thringstone ===
Thringstone (2 seats)
Party	Candidate	Votes	%	±%
Labour	Dave Everitt	882	29.5	+9.1
Labour	Leon Spence	853	28.5	+5.5
Conservative	Antony Dandy	576	19.3	+1.2
Conservative	Jakob Whiten	397	13.3	−0.3
Liberal Democrats	Nicola Timmins	156	5.2	−7.7
Liberal Democrats	James Fox	126	4.2	−7.8
Turnout		1,495	48.0	
Labour hold		Swing		
Labour hold		Swing		

Ward summary
Party	Votes	% Votes	±%	Seats	Change
Labour	1,735	58.0	+14.6	2	
Conservative	973	32.5	+0.7	0	
Liberal Democrats	282	9.4	−15.4	0	
Total Votes Cast	2,990				

=== Valley ===
Valley (2 seats)
Party	Candidate	Votes	%	±%
Conservative	Rowena Holland	1,041	36.9	+5.1
Conservative	David Stevenson	977	34.6	+3.8
Labour	John Pegg	461	16.3	+6.9
Liberal Democrats	Paul Tyler	342	12.1	+0.7
Turnout		1,411	50.7	
Conservative hold		Swing		
Conservative hold		Swing		

Ward summary
Party	Votes	% Votes	±%	Seats	Change
Conservative	2,018	71.5	+8.9	2	
Labour	461	16.3	±0.0	0	
Liberal Democrats	342	12.1	+0.7	0	
Total Votes Cast	2,821				

=== Whitwick ===
Whitwick (3 seats)
Party	Candidate	Votes	%	±%
Labour	Derek Howe	1,215	20.2	+7.2
Conservative	Tony Gillard	1,042	17.3	+6.2
Labour	Ray Woodward	1,011	16.8	+6.0
Conservative	Russell Boam	885	14.7	+6.9
Conservative	Craig Bowley	721	12.0	+5.3
BNP	Ian Meller	616	10.3	−4.0
Liberal Democrats	Daniel Bowler	188	3.1	−6.9
Liberal Democrats	Maureen Wyatt	166	2.8	−6.1
Liberal Democrats	Angela Windram	164	2.7	−6.0
Turnout		2,003	49.3	
Labour gain from BNP		Swing		
Conservative hold		Swing		
Labour hold		Swing		

Ward summary
Party	Votes	% Votes	±%	Seats	Change
Conservative	2,648	44.1	+18.6	1	
Labour	2,226	37.1	+4.5	2	+1
BNP	616	10.3	−4.0	0	−1
Liberal Democrats	518	8.6	−19.0	0	
Total Votes Cast	6,008				
