= 1995 North West Leicestershire District Council election =

1995 UK local government election

Elections to North West Leicestershire District Council took place on 4 May 1995, with the previous election having taken place in 1991 and with the next held in 1999. The election took place across all 22 electoral wards and a total of 40 councillors were elected. Labour tightened its grip on the council by capturing nine seats from the Conservatives. Former Conservative rural strongholds such as Appleby, Breedon, Kegworth and Ravenstone fell to Labour, who also came away with all but one seat in Ashby. The result was that Labour held 35, or 87.5% of the seats, the Conservatives were reduced to just three seats and the Liberal Democrats failed to gain any seats.

== Results ==
North West Leicestershire District Council election, 1995
Party	Seats	Gains	Losses	Net gain/loss	Seats %	Votes %	Votes	+/−
Labour	35	9	0	+9	87.5	64.5	22,853	
Conservative	3	0	10	−10	7.5	14.3	5,072	
Independent	2	1	0	+1	5.3	16.4	5,816	
Liberal Democrats	0	0	0	±0	0	4.2	1,499	
Ind. Conservative	0	0	0	±0	0	0.6	223	

== Ward results ==
In wards that are represented by more than one councillor, electors were given more than one vote each, hence the voter turnout may not match the number of votes cast.

Appleby (1 seat)
Party	Candidate	Votes	%	±%
Labour	J. Lewis	565	60.0	
Conservative	S. Bryan	377	40.0	
Turnout		942		
Labour gain from Conservative		Swing		

Ashby Castle (1 seat)
Party	Candidate	Votes	%	±%
Independent	G. Orme	386	39.6	
Labour	J. Groves	254	26.1	
Conservative	J. Coxon	235	24.1	
Liberal Democrats	F. Fenning	99	10.2	
Turnout		687		
Independent gain from Conservative		Swing		

Ashby Holywell (2 seats)
Party	Candidate	Votes	%	±%
Labour	L. Whetton	831	29.8	
Labour	J. Fisher	804	28.9	
Conservative	R. Bayliss	371	13.3	
Liberal Democrats	P. Thompson	269	9.7	
Conservative	Y. Henniker-Heaton	257	9.2	
Liberal Democrats	G. Cort	254	9.1	
Turnout		1,393		
Labour hold		Swing		
Labour gain from Conservative		Swing		

Ashby Ivanhoe (2 seats)
Party	Candidate	Votes	%	±%
Labour	B. Mitchell	889	27.5	
Labour	J. Roberts	800	24.7	
Liberal Democrats	P. Cort	453	14.0	
Liberal Democrats	A. Thompson	424	13.1	
Conservative	P. Rushton	366	11.3	
Conservative	G. Allman	304	9.4	
Turnout		1,618		
Labour gain from Conservative		Swing		
Labour gain from Conservative		Swing		

Breedon (1 seat)
Party	Candidate	Votes	%	±%
Labour	S. Spear	424	56.2	
Conservative	N. Rushton	330	43.8	
Turnout		754		
Labour gain from Conservative		Swing		

Castle Donington (3 seats)
Party	Candidate	Votes	%	±%
Labour	D. Wintle	1135	20.5	
Independent	P. Beddoe	1071	19.4	
Labour	J. Georget	963	17.4	
Independent	L. Hooley	850	15.4	
Labour	C Sawyer	768	13.9	
Independent	A. Saffell	738	13.4	
Turnout		1,842		
Labour hold		Swing		
Independent hold		Swing		
Labour gain from Conservative		Swing		

Coalville (2 seats)
Party	Candidate	Votes	%	±%
Labour	B. Hall	748	42.7	
Labour	W. Wildgoose	701	40.1	
Independent	P. Holland	301	17.2	
Turnout		875		
Labour hold		Swing		
Labour hold		Swing		

Greenhill (3 seats)
Party	Candidate	Votes	%	±%
Labour	A. Smith	unopposed		
Labour	S. Sheahan	unopposed		
Labour	C. Stanley	unopposed		
Turnout		N/A		
Labour hold		Swing		
Labour hold		Swing		
Labour hold		Swing		

Holly Hayes (2 seats)
Party	Candidate	Votes	%	±%
Labour	P. Clayfield	776	39.0	
Labour	A. Pearson	759	38.1	
Independent	K. McHugh	457	22.9	
Turnout		996		
Labour hold		Swing		
Labour hold		Swing		

Hugglescote (2 seats)
Party	Candidate	Votes	%	±%
Labour	S. Peace	833	40.8	
Labour	P. Hyde	830	40.6	
Independent	A. Parker	378	18.5	
Turnout		1,021		
Labour hold		Swing		
Labour hold		Swing		

Ibstock and Heather (3 seats)
Party	Candidate	Votes	%	±%
Labour	D. Costello	1389	28.8	
Labour	A. Smith	1270	26.3	
Labour	D. Male	1158	24.0	
Independent	C. Allen	424	8.8	
Independent	V. Richichi	345	7.1	
Independent	J. Kailofer	240	5.0	
Turnout		1,609		
Labour hold		Swing		
Labour hold		Swing		
Labour hold		Swing		

Kegworth (2 seats)
Party	Candidate	Votes	%	±%
Labour	F. Harris	849	30.1	
Labour	D. Manley	767	27.2	
Conservative	L. Pendleton	637	22.6	
Conservative	M. Ward	566	20.1	
Turnout		1,410		
Labour gain from Conservative		Swing		
Labour gain from Conservative		Swing		

Long Watton (1 seat)
Party	Candidate	Votes	%	±%
Conservative	V. Fletcher	285	54.8	
Labour	F. Harris	235	45.2	
Turnout		520		
Conservative hold		Swing		

Measham (2 seats)
Party	Candidate	Votes	%	±%
Labour	D. Jones	unopposed		
Labour	D. Williamson	unopposed		
Turnout		N/A		
Labour hold		Swing		
Labour hold		Swing		

Moira (2 seats)
Party	Candidate	Votes	%	±%
Labour	P. Regan	unopposed		
Labour	H. Sankey	unopposed		
Turnout		N/A		
Labour hold		Swing		
Labour hold		Swing		

Oakthorpe and Donisthorpe (1 seat)
Party	Candidate	Votes	%	±%
Labour	G. Davies	unopposed		
Turnout		N/A		
Labour hold		Swing		

Ravenstone (1 seat)
Party	Candidate	Votes	%	±%
Labour	M. Abbott	561	51.2	
Conservative	N. Smith	311	28.4	
Ind. Conservative	M. Lander	223	20.4	
Turnout		1,095		
Labour gain from Conservative		Swing		

Snibston (2 seats)
Party	Candidate	Votes	%	±%
Labour	A. Geary	unopposed		
Labour	F. Straw	unopposed		
Turnout		N/A		
Labour hold		Swing		
Labour hold		Swing		

Swannington (1 seat)
Party	Candidate	Votes	%	±%
Conservative	B. Webster	441	50.1	
Labour	W. Quelch	322	36.5	
Independent	T. Green	118	13.4	
Turnout		881		
Conservative hold		Swing		

Thringstone (2 seats)
Party	Candidate	Votes	%	±%
Labour	A. Cross	unopposed		
Labour	A. Smith	unopposed		
Turnout		N/A		
Labour hold		Swing		
Labour hold		Swing		

Whitwick (3 seats)
Party	Candidate	Votes	%	±%
Labour	D. Howe	1579	34.6	
Labour	R. Woodward	1226	26.9	
Labour	S. Preston	1139	24.9	
Conservative	P. Ritchie	312	6.8	
Independent	H. Smith	309	6.8	
Turnout		1,522		
Labour hold		Swing		
Labour hold		Swing		
Labour hold		Swing		

Worthington (1 seat)
Party	Candidate	Votes	%	±%
Conservative	D. Stevenson	280	37.0	
Labour	J. Dutton	278	36.7	
Independent	L. Mann	199	26.3	
Turnout		757		
Conservative hold		Swing		
