= 2003 North West Leicestershire District Council election =

Labour retains control

Elections to North West Leicestershire District Council took place on 1 May 2003, with the previous election having taken place in 1999 and with the next held in May 2007. The election took place across all 20 electoral wards and a total of 38 councillors were elected. The Labour Party retained control of the council for the fourth election in a row, albeit with a narrow majority of two seats.

== Results ==
A map of North West Leicestershire coloured by victorious party at the 2003 District Council election.

North West Leicestershire District Council election, 2003
Party	Seats	Gains	Losses	Net gain/loss	Seats %	Votes %	Votes	+/−
Labour	20			−11	52.6	50.6	19,134	
Conservative	12			+4	31.6	31.9	12,061	
Liberal Democrats	4			+4	10.5	13.4	5,052	
Independent	2			+1	5.3	4.1	1,559	

== Ward results ==
In wards that are represented by more than one councillor, electors were given more than one vote each, hence the voter turnout may not match the number of votes cast.

Appleby (1 seat)
Party	Candidate	Votes	%	±%
Conservative	Edward Blunt	572	72.3	
Labour	Michael Dyer	219	27.7	
Turnout		791		

Ashby Castle (1 seat)
Party	Candidate	Votes	%	±%
Conservative	John Geoffrey Coxon	502	73.1	
Labour	Theresa Eynon	185	26.9	
Turnout		687		

Ashby Holywell (2 seats)
Party	Candidate	Votes	%	±%
Conservative	Roger David Bayliss	393	21.8	
Labour	Gordon Tacey	357	19.8	
Conservative	Graham Arthur Allman	323	17.9	
Labour	John Legrys	321	17.8	
Liberal Democrats	David John Price	214	11.9	
Liberal Democrats	Peter Douglas Thompson	197	10.9	
Turnout		903		

Ashby Ivanhoe (2 seats)
Party	Candidate	Votes	%	±%
Labour	David Paul Whetton	728	29.2	
Labour	Sean David Sheahan	649	26.0	
Conservative	David Geraint Jones	559	22.4	
Conservative	Yvo Henniker-Heaton	557	22.3	
Turnout		1,247		

Bardon (1 seat)
Party	Candidate	Votes	%	±%
Conservative	Ted Purver	227	61.7	
Labour	David Everitt	141	38.3	
Turnout		368		

Breedon (1 seat)
Party	Candidate	Votes	%	±%
Conservative	Nicholas James Rushton	571	68.5	
Liberal Democrats	Martyn Lewis Hening	144	17.3	
Labour	Malcolm Harry Smith	118	14.2	
Turnout		833		

Castle Donington (3 seats)
Party	Candidate	Votes	%	±%
Conservative	Gerald Dalby	890	20.2	
Labour	Derek Henry Wintle	781	17.7	
Conservative	Tony Saffell	746	16.9	
Conservative	Neil Cox	722	16.3	
Labour	Patrick David Lynch	666	15.1	
Labour	Andrew Talliss	604	13.7	
Turnout		2,205		

Coalville (2 seats)
Party	Candidate	Votes	%	±%
Independent	Philip Holland	509	28.4	
Independent	Karen Suzanne Clarke	472	26.4	
Labour	Wilfred Wildgoose	430	24.0	
Labour	Barry Walter Hall	380	21.2	
Turnout		896		

Greenhill (3 seats)
Party	Candidate	Votes	%	±%
Liberal Democrats	Michael Barry Wyatt	964	22.4	
Liberal Democrats	James Collins	794	18.5	
Liberal Democrats	Julie Anne Roberts	780	18.2	
Labour	Adoline Uvenia Smith	635	14.8	
Labour	Clifford Adrian Stanley	591	13.7	
Labour	Joseph Harry Smith	532	12.4	
Turnout		1,432		

Hugglescote (2 seats)
Party	Candidate	Votes	%	±%
Labour	Paul Anthony Hyde	481	37.5	
Labour	Steven John Peace	462	36.1	
Liberal Democrats	Barry George Horne	338	26.4	
Turnout		641		

Ibstock and Heather (3 seats)
Party	Candidate	Votes	%	±%
Labour	Felix Fenning	672	23.7	
Labour	Alison Helen Harrop	659	23.2	
Labour	Dai Male	648	22.8	
Conservative	Ian William Hewson	433	15.3	
Conservative	Karen Lavinia Hewson	424	15.0	
Turnout		945		

Kegworth and Whatton (2 seats)
Party	Candidate	Votes	%	±%
Conservative	Trevor Pendleton	852	37.7	
Conservative	Alison Smith	673	29.8	
Labour	James Harry Roberts	370	16.4	
Labour	Derek Keith Barham	363	16.1	
Turnout		1,129		

Measham (2 seats)
Party	Candidate	Votes	%	±%
Labour	John Lewis	582	42.5	
Labour	Edward John Palmer	417	30.5	
Conservative	Patrick Michael Byrne	370	27.0	
Turnout		685		

Moira (2 seats)
Party	Candidate	Votes	%	±%
Labour	Patrick John Regan	719	39.0	
Labour	Mark Jonathan Chadbourn	668	36.3	
Conservative	Paul Dunkin Rushton	455	24.7	
Turnout		921		

Oakthorpe and Donisthorpe (1 seat)
Party	Candidate	Votes	%	±%
Labour	Glynn John Davies	316	60.7	
Independent	Frederick Thomas Sharpe	131	25.1	
Independent	Leonard Michael Warwicker	74	14.2	
Turnout		521		

Ravenstone (1 seat)
Party	Candidate	Votes	%	±%
Conservative	Nigel Smith	522	56.0	
Labour	Helen Mary Abbott	410	44.0	
Turnout		932		

Snibston (2 seats)
Party	Candidate	Votes	%	±%
Labour	John Geary	521	28.3	
Labour	Frank Straw	477	25.9	
Conservative	Peter Garth Lacey	469	25.5	
Independent	Richard Stanley Kowalski	373	20.3	
Turnout		920		

Thringstone (2 seats)
Party	Candidate	Votes	%	±%
Labour	Roderick Adrian Evans	552	24.8	
Labour	Pam Clayfield	527	23.7	
Liberal Democrats	Colin Pickering	517	23.3	
Liberal Democrats	Susan Lesley Pickering	448	20.2	
Conservative	Sudesh Mattu	179	8.1	
Turnout		1,112		

Valley (2 seats)
Party	Candidate	Votes	%	±%
Conservative	David John Stevenson	834	35.1	
Conservative	Barry Webster	788	33.2	
Labour	Terence Green	401	16.9	
Labour	Jonathan Kirk Abbott	351	14.8	
Turnout		1,187		

Whitwick (3 seats)
Party	Candidate	Votes	%	±%
Labour	Derek Howe	886	31.0	
Labour	Ray Woodward	715	25.0	
Liberal Democrats	David James Wyatt	656	23.0	
Labour	Steve Preston	600	21.0	
Turnout		953		
