= Ashby Castle =

Suburb and ward of Ashby-de-la-Zouch in Leicestershire, England

Coordinates: 52.744153°N 1.463206°W

Castle
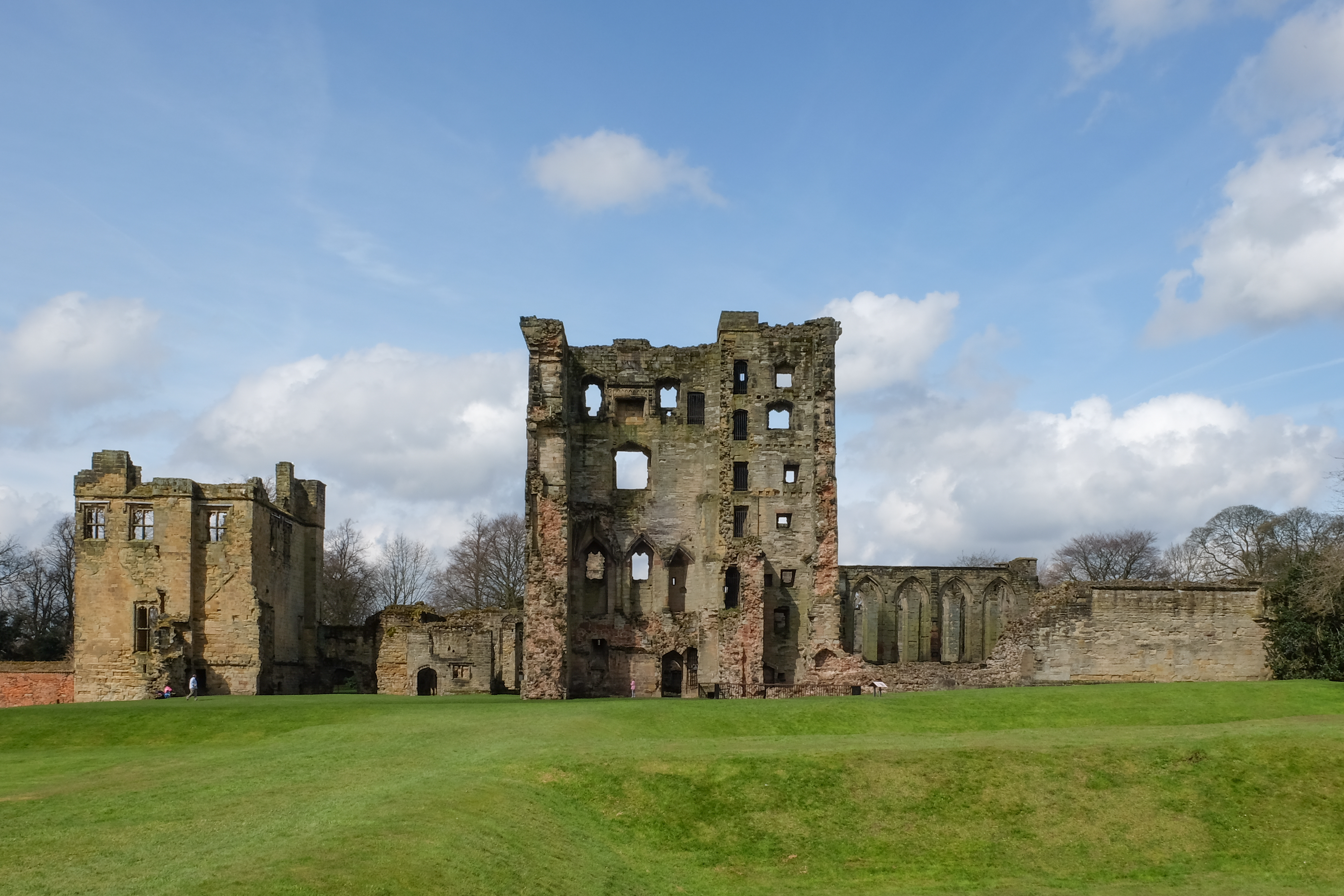
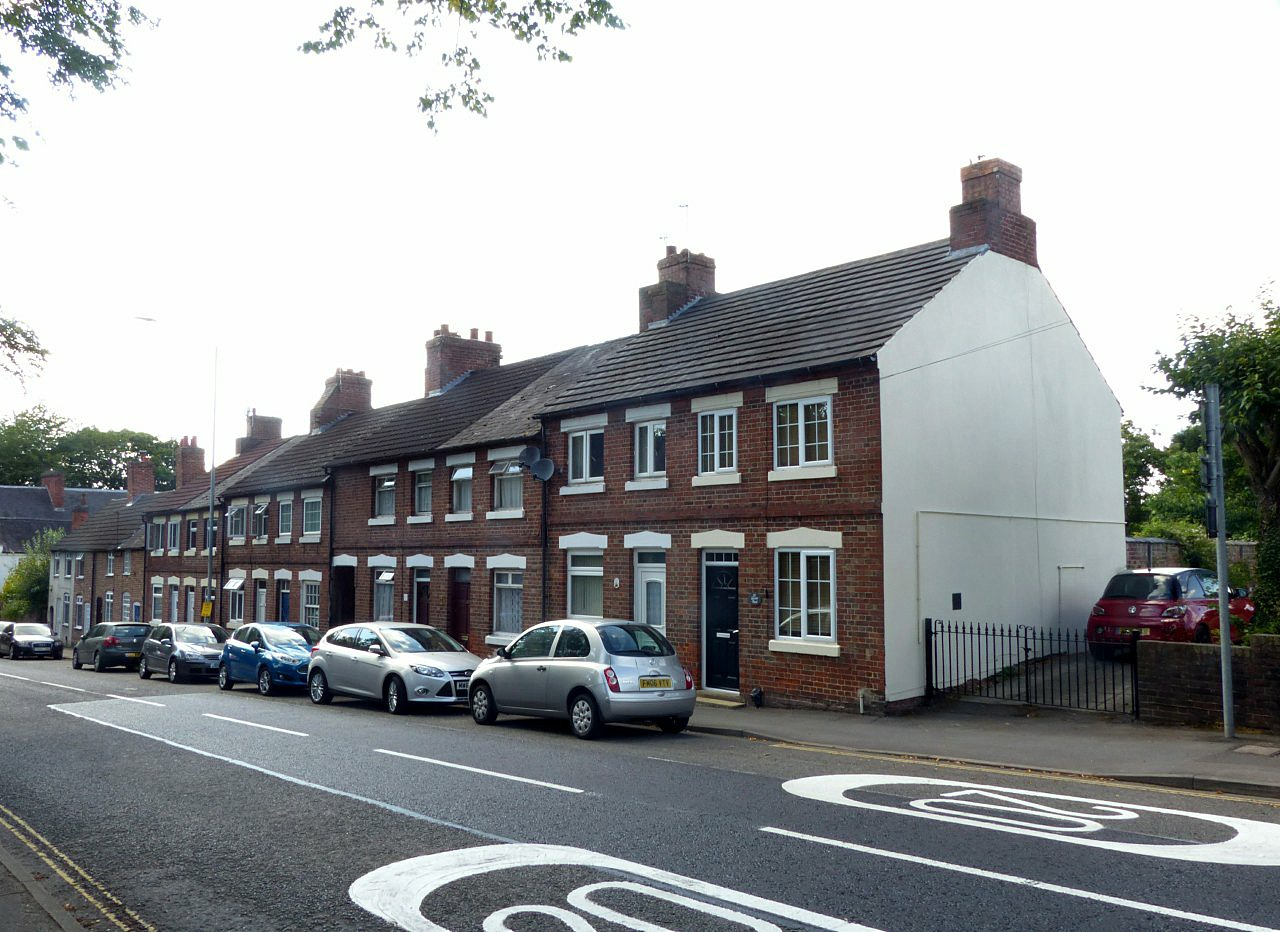
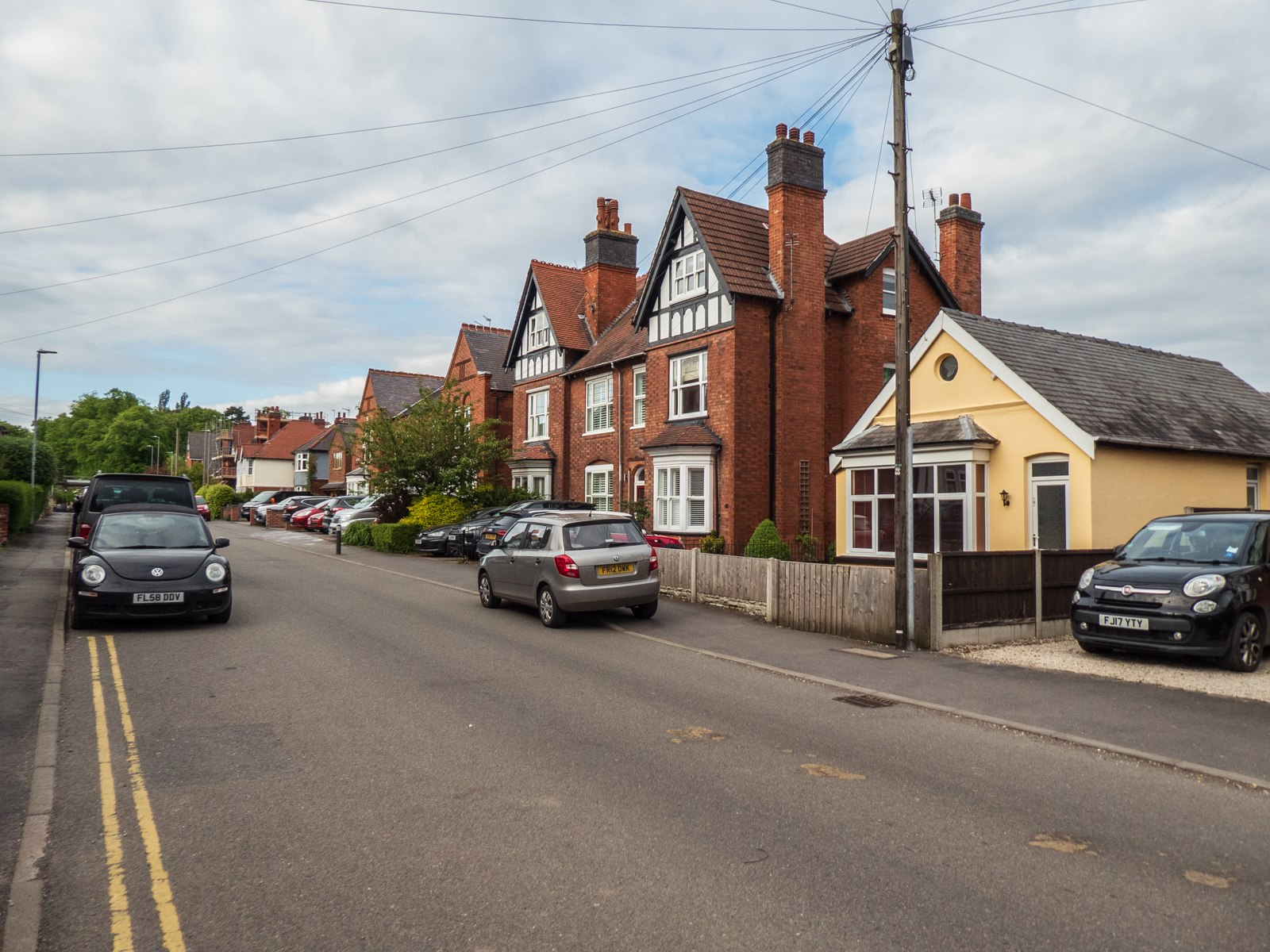
- Clockwise from top: Ashby de la Zouch Castle, Lower Packington Road & Leicester Road

- Location within Leicestershire
- Population: 3,171 (2021 Census Ward Profile)
  - London: 115 mi (185 km) SE
- Civil parish: Ashby-de-la-Zouch
- District: North West Leicestershire
- Shire county: Leicestershire
- Region: East Midlands
- Country: England
- Sovereign state: United Kingdom
- Post town: Ashby-de-la-Zouch
- Postcode district: LE65
- Dialling code: 01530
- Police: Leicestershire
- Fire: Leicestershire
- Ambulance: East Midlands
- UK Parliament: North West Leicestershire

Castle is a ward and suburb of Ashby-de-la-Zouch in Leicestershire, England.

== Geography ==
The ward covers the southeastern part of Ashby and takes its name from the castle.

== Demographics ==
At the 2021 census, the ward profile population was 3,171. Of the findings, the ethnicity and religious composition of the ward was:

Ashby Castle: Ethnicity: 2021 Census
Ethnic group	Population	%
White	3,040	95.9%
Asian or Asian British	72	2.3%
Mixed	51	1.6%
Other Ethnic Group	6	0.1%
Black or Black British	2	0.1%
Total	3,171	100%

The religious composition of the ward at the 2021 Census was recorded as:

Ashby Castle: Religion: 2021 Census
Religious	Population	%
Christian	1,639	54.2%
Irreligious	1,314	43.5%
Hindu	37	1.2%
Other religion	17	0.6%
Buddhist	4	0.1%
Jewish	4	0.1%
Sikh	4	0.1%
Muslim	2	0.1%
Total	3,171	100%
