= 2007 North West Leicestershire District Council election =

2007 UK local government election

Elections for North West Leicestershire District Council took place on 3 May 2007, with the previous election taking place in 2003 and with the next held on 5 May 2011. The election took place across all 20 electoral wards and a total of 38 councillors were elected. This election was a landslide win for the Conservatives who gained an absolute majority in the council for the first time since its creation in 1973.

== Results ==
A map of North West Leicestershire coloured by victorious party at the 2007 District Council election.

North West Leicestershire District Council election, 2007
Party	Seats	Gains	Losses	Net gain/loss	Seats %	Votes %	Votes	+/−
Conservative	27	15	0	+15	71.1	45.3	24,670	+13.4
Labour	5	1	16	−15	13.2	31.4	17,097	−19.2
Liberal Democrats	3	0	1	−1	7.9	14.4	7,839	+1.0
BNP	2	2	0	+2	5.3	4.9	2,665	New
Independent	1	0	1	−1	2.6	3.2	1,734	−0.9
UKIP	0	0	0	±0	0	0.8	411	New

== Ward results ==
In wards that are represented by more than one councillor, electors were given more than one vote each, hence the voter turnout may not match the number of votes cast.

Appleby (1 seat)
Party	Candidate	Votes	%	±%
Conservative	Richard Blunt	722	77.5	+5.2
Labour	Maureen Palmer	210	22.5	−5.2
Turnout		932		
Conservative hold		Swing		

Ashby Castle (1 seat)
Party	Candidate	Votes	%	±%
Conservative	John Geoffrey Coxon	633	66.5	−6.6
Labour	Gerry Pointon	167	17.5	−9.4
Liberal Democrats	Michael Geoffrey Cort	152	16.0	N/A
Turnout		952		
Conservative hold		Swing		

Ashby Holywell (2 seats)
Party	Candidate	Votes	%	±%
Conservative	Roger David Bayliss	668	25.6	+3.8
Conservative	Graham Arthur Allman	583	22.3	+4.4
Labour	Martin Hilary Mabey	383	14.7	−3.1
Labour	Gordon Tacey	351	13.4	−6.4
Liberal Democrats	David John Price	320	12.3	+0.4
Liberal Democrats	Geoffrey Ronald Cort	307	11.7	+0.8
Turnout		1,306		
Conservative hold		Swing		
Conservative gain from Labour		Swing		

Ashby Ivanhoe (2 seats)
Party	Candidate	Votes	%	±%
Conservative	James Hoult	905	28.6	+6.3
Conservative	David Geraint Jones	883	27.9	+5.5
Labour	David Paul Whetton	603	19.1	−10.1
Labour	Sean David Sheahan	507	16.0	−10.0
Liberal Democrats	Lee James Windram	265	8.4	N/A
Turnout		1,582		
Conservative gain from Labour		Swing		
Conservative gain from Labour		Swing		

Bardon (1 seat)
Party	Candidate	Votes	%	±%
Conservative	Ted Purver	388	57.1	−4.6
Labour	Rodney Peter Storer	170	25.0	−13.3
Liberal Democrats	Sheila Maureen Wyatt	122	17.9	N/A
Turnout		680		
Conservative hold		Swing		

Breedon (1 seat)
Party	Candidate	Votes	%	±%
Conservative	Nicholas James Rushton	729	80.2	+11.7
Labour	Yvonne Smith	180	19.8	+5.6
Turnout		909		
Conservative hold		Swing		

Castle Donington (3 seats)
Party	Candidate	Votes	%	±%
Conservative	Gerald Dalby	1360	24.5	+4.3
Conservative	Tony Saffell	1243	22.4	+5.5
Conservative	Charles Meynell	1087	19.6	+3.3
Labour	Derek Henry Wintle	734	13.2	−4.5
Labour	Patrick David Lynch	679	12.3	−2.8
Labour	Robert Allan Haskins	442	8.0	−5.7
Turnout		1,848		
Conservative hold		Swing		
Conservative gain from Labour		Swing		
Conservative hold		Swing		

Coalville (2 seats)
Party	Candidate	Votes	%	±%
Independent	Philip Holland	509	23.8	−4.6
Labour	John Legrys	501	23.4	−0.6
BNP	Sean Martyn Lee	483	22.6	N/A
Conservative	Rebecca Harding	325	15.2	N/A
Conservative	Paul Richard Oakden	321	15.0	N/A
Turnout		1,069		
Independent hold		Swing		
Labour gain from Independent		Swing		

Greenhill (3 seats)
Party	Candidate	Votes	%	±%
Liberal Democrats	Michael Barry Wyatt	873	13.9	−8.5
Liberal Democrats	Julie Anne Roberts	749	11.9	−6.3
Liberal Democrats	Dominic John McGill	713	11.4	−7.1
Labour	Jim Collins	601	9.6	−5.2
Labour	Adi Freeman	541	8.6	−5.1
BNP	Gavin Sharpe	515	8.2	N/A
Conservative	Keith Merrie	472	7.5	N/A
Labour	Jim Roberts	470	7.5	−4.9
Conservative	Paul Bridgen	468	7.5	N/A
Independent	Adoline Uvenia Smith	446	7.1	N/A
Conservative	John Turnbull Kailofer	424	6.8	N/A
Turnout		2,091		
Liberal Democrats hold		Swing		
Liberal Democrats hold		Swing		
Liberal Democrats hold		Swing		

Hugglescote (2 seats)
Party	Candidate	Votes	%	±%
BNP	Graham Ronald Partner	449	16.1	N/A
Conservative	Matthew John Blain	410	14.7	N/A
Labour	Steven John Peace	355	12.7	−23.4
Labour	Paul Anthony Hyde	329	11.8	−25.7
Conservative	Sudesh Mattu	290	10.4	N/A
Liberal Democrats	Lesley Bowler	273	9.8	−16.6
Liberal Democrats	David Perrins	267	9.6	N/A
Independent	Matt Pollard	217	7.8	N/A
Independent	Fred Harris	196	7.0	N/A
Turnout		1,393		
BNP gain from Labour		Swing		
Conservative gain from Labour		Swing		

Ibstock and Heather (3 seats)
Party	Candidate	Votes	%	±%
Conservative	Craig Bowley	737	15.3	±0.0
Conservative	Ted Blunt	731	15.2	+0.2
Labour	Dai Male	707	14.7	−8.1
Labour	Penny Hopkins	620	12.9	−10.8
Conservative	Mary Powell	599	12.5	N/A
Labour	Ray Merry	559	11.6	−11.2
UKIP	Adam Rowland Tilbury	411	8.5	N/A
Liberal Democrats	Leighanna Marie Littlejohn	225	4.7	N/A
Liberal Democrats	Ben Alan Roberts	222	4.6	N/A
Turnout		1,604		
Conservative gain from Labour		Swing		
Conservative gain from Labour		Swing		
Labour hold		Swing		

Kegworth and Whatton (2 seats)
Party	Candidate	Votes	%	±%
Conservative	Trevor Pendleton	1011	46.5	+8.8
Conservative	Alison Smith	736	33.9	+4.1
Labour	Lawrence Heap	427	19.6	+3.2
Turnout		1,087		
Conservative hold		Swing		
Conservative hold		Swing		

Measham (2 seats)
Party	Candidate	Votes	%	±%
Conservative	Rowena Emma Holland	548	24.1	−2.9
Conservative	Dickie Hunt	538	23.6	N/A
Labour	John Lewis	481	21.1	−21.4
Labour	Tom Neilson	468	20.6	−9.9
Liberal Democrats	Alexander Longdon	241	10.6	N/A
Turnout		1,138		
Conservative gain from Labour		Swing		
Conservative gain from Labour		Swing		

Moira (2 seats)
Party	Candidate	Votes	%	±%
Conservative	Annette Bridges	794	27.9	+3.2
Conservative	John Bridges	755	26.5	N/A
Labour	Eddie Palmer	651	22.8	−13.5
Labour	Patrick John Regan	650	22.8	−16.2
Turnout		1,425		
Conservative gain from Labour		Swing		
Conservative gain from Labour		Swing		

Oakthorpe and Donisthorpe (1 seat)
Party	Candidate	Votes	%	±%
Conservative	Jackie Bridgen	441	55.0	N/A
Labour	Glynn John Davies	361	45.0	−15.7
Turnout		802		
Conservative gain from Labour		Swing		

Ravenstone and Packington (1 seat)
Party	Candidate	Votes	%	±%
Conservative	Nigel Smith	560	50.0	−6.0
Independent	Virge Richichi	366	32.7	N/A
Labour	George Arthur Botterill	193	17.3	−26.7
Turnout		1,119		
Conservative hold		Swing		

Snibston (2 seats)
Party	Candidate	Votes	%	±%
Conservative	Paula Diana Purver	595	24.9	−0.6
Conservative	Christopher Timmis	525	21.9	N/A
Labour	Alison Jane Cooper	487	20.4	−5.5
Labour	John Geary	482	20.2	−8.1
Liberal Democrats	Colin Pickering	301	12.6	N/A
Turnout		1,195		
Conservative gain from Labour		Swing		
Conservative gain from Labour		Swing		

Thringstone (2 seats)
Party	Candidate	Votes	%	±%
Labour	Pam Clayfield	634	23.0	−0.7
Labour	David Burton Everitt	564	20.4	−4.4
Conservative	Clare Louise Blain	501	18.1	+10.0
Conservative	Yvo Henniker-Heaton	376	13.6	N/A
Liberal Democrats	Shane David Bowler	355	12.9	−10.4
Liberal Democrats	Darren James Finney	331	12.0	−8.2
Turnout		1,381		
Labour hold		Swing		
Labour hold		Swing		

Valley (2 seats)
Party	Candidate	Votes	%	±%
Conservative	David John Stevenson	958	31.8	−3.3
Conservative	Barry Webster	928	30.8	−2.4
Liberal Democrats	Nicola Timmins	342	11.4	N/A
BNP	Daniel Nathan Woolcock	296	9.8	N/A
Labour	Patricia Jeannine Underwood	284	9.4	−7.5
Labour	Corinne Male	206	6.8	−8.0
Turnout		1,507		
Conservative hold		Swing		
Conservative hold		Swing		

Whitwick (3 seats)
Party	Candidate	Votes	%	±%
BNP	Ian Meller	922	14.3	N/A
Labour	Derek Howe	839	13.0	−18.0
Conservative	Tony Gillard	712	11.1	N/A
Labour	Ray Woodward	699	10.8	−14.2
Liberal Democrats	Ann Edwards	644	10.0	N/A
Liberal Democrats	Daniel Leslie Bowler	574	8.9	N/A
Liberal Democrats	David James Wyatt	563	8.7	−14.3
Labour	Steve Preston	562	8.7	−12.3
Conservative	David Russell Ruck	500	7.8	N/A
Conservative	Sandra Mary Ruck	429	6.7	N/A
Turnout		2,148		
BNP gain from Labour		Swing		
Labour hold		Swing		
Conservative gain from Liberal Democrats		Swing		
