= North West Leicestershire =

Coordinates: 52°43′01″N 1°22′12″W

North West Leicestershire District
- Non-metropolitan district
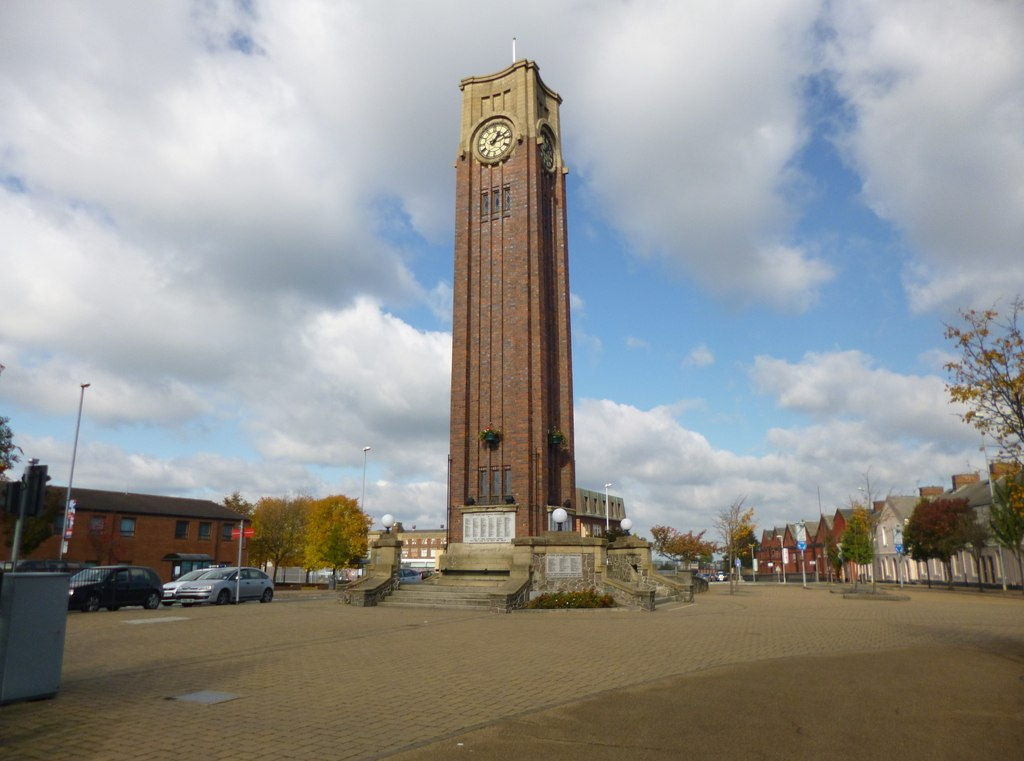
- Coalville, the largest town and administrative centre of North West Leicestershire district

- Shown within Leicestershire
- Sovereign state: United Kingdom
- Constituent country: England
- Region: East Midlands
- Administrative county: Leicestershire
- Admin. HQ: Coalville

Government
  - Type: North West Leicestershire District Council
  - MP: Amanda Hack (Labour)

Area
  - Total: 108 sq mi (279 km^{2})
  - Rank: 126th

Population (2024)
  - Total: 111,881
  - Rank: Ranked 223rd
  - Density: 1,040/sq mi (401/km^{2})

Ethnicity (2021)
  - Ethnic groups: List: 95.9% White; 1.5% Asian; 1.5% Mixed; 0.6% Black; 0.5% other

Religion (2021)
  - Religion: List: 51.8% Christianity; 46.3% no religion; 1.5% other; 0.4% Islam
- Time zone: UTC+0 (Greenwich Mean Time)
  - Summer (DST): UTC+1 (British Summer Time)
- ONS code: 31UH (ONS); E07000134 (GSS)
- Ethnicity: 98.8% White

North West Leicestershire is a local government district in Leicestershire, England. The towns in the district include of Ashby-de-la-Zouch, Castle Donington, Coalville (where the council is based) and Ibstock. Notable villages in the district include Donington le Heath, Ellistown, Hugglescote, Kegworth, Measham, Shackerstone, Thringstone and Whitwick.

Castle Donington is notable as the location of Donington Park, a grand-prix circuit and a major venue for music festivals. The area has a long history of mineral extraction, with coal, brick clay, gravel and granite amongst the products. All the deep coal mines in the area have closed, but opencast mining still continues. The district is also home to part of the Battlefield Line and the Ibstock Brick.

The neighbouring districts are Charnwood, Hinckley and Bosworth, North Warwickshire, Lichfield, South Derbyshire, Erewash and Rushcliffe.

== History ==
The district was created on 1 April 1974 under the Local Government Act 1972, covering the whole area of five former districts plus a single parish from a sixth, which districts were all abolished at the same time:

- Ashby-de-la-Zouch Urban District
- Ashby de la Zouch Rural District
- Ashby Woulds Urban District
- Castle Donington Rural District
- Coalville Urban District
- Market Bosworth Rural District (Ibstock parish only, rest went to Hinckley and Bosworth)

The new district was named North West Leicestershire, reflecting its position in the wider county.

== Abolition ==
Under current local government reform plans, the district will be abolished in 2028 with its area becoming part of a Leicestershire and Rutland unitary authority.

== Governance ==
North West Leicestershire District Council

Type
- Type: Non-metropolitan district

History
- Founded: 1 April 1974

Leadership
- Chair: Paul Lees, Conservative since 13 May 2025
- Leader: Richard Blunt, Conservative since 15 May 2007
- Chief Executive: Allison Thomas since 11 August 2022

Structure
- Seats: 38 councillors
- Graph of the party split among 38 seats.
- Political groups: Administration (18) Conservative (11) Liberal Democrat (5) Independent (3) Other parties (19) Labour (17) Independent (2)
- Length of term: 4 years

Elections
- Last election: 4 May 2023

Meeting place
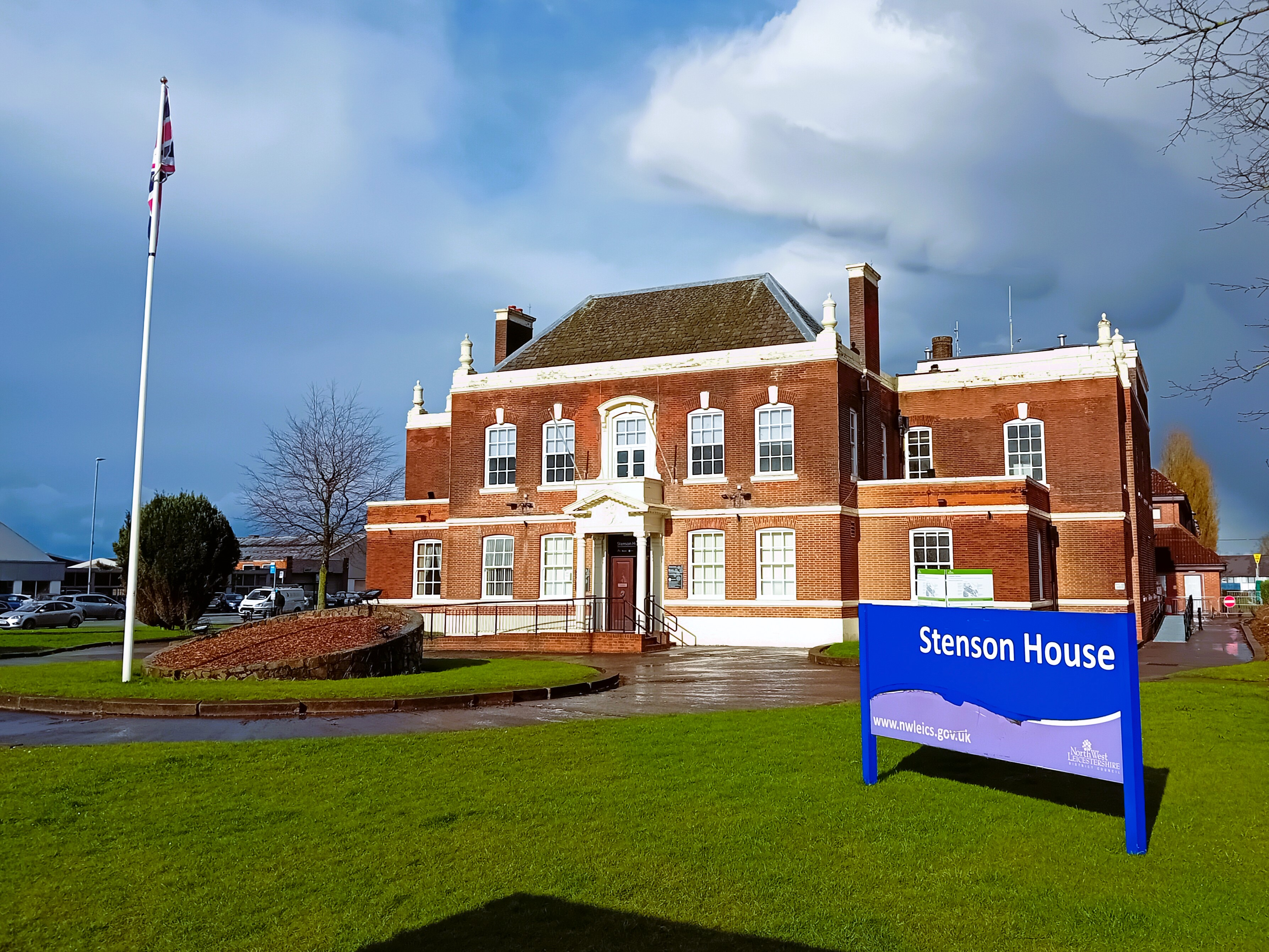
- Stenson House, London Road, Coalville, LE67 3FN

Website
- www.nwleics.gov.uk

North West Leicestershire District Council provides district-level services. County-level services are provided by Leicestershire County Council. Much of the district is also covered by civil parishes, which form a third tier of local government.

=== Political control ===
The council has been under no overall control since the 2023 election, being run by an alliance of the Conservatives, Liberal Democrats and two of the independent councillors, led by Conservative councillor Richard Blunt.

The first election to the council was held in 1973, initially operating as a shadow authority alongside the outgoing authorities until coming into its powers on 1 April 1974. Since 1974 political control of the council has been as follows:

Party in control	Years
Labour	1974–1976
No overall control	1976–1979
Labour	1979–1983
No overall control	1983–1991
Labour	1991–2007
Conservative	2007–2023
No overall control	2023–present

=== Leadership ===
The leaders of the council since 2003 have been:

Councillor	Party	From	To
Frank Straw	Labour	pre-2003	May 2007
Richard Blunt	Conservative	15 May 2007	

=== Composition ===
Following the 2023 election, and subsequent changes up to August 2026, the composition of the council was:

Party	Councillors
Labour	17
Conservative	11
Liberal Democrats	5
Independent	5
Total	38

The Conservatives, Liberal Democrats and three of the independent councillors sit together as the "Alliance Group" which forms the council's administration.

=== Elections ===
Since the last boundary changes in 2015 the district has comprised 38 wards, each of which elects one councillor. Elections are held every four years.

The district is coterminous with the North West Leicestershire parliamentary constituency.

=== Premises ===
The council meets at Stenson House on London Road in Coalville. The building was built in 1934 as the headquarters of the old Coalville Urban District Council. Following the creation of North West Leicestershire in 1974 the building was significantly extended to the rear. In 2022 the extension was closed pending demolition, and the council opened a new customer services centre on Belvoir Road, retaining and refurbishing the 1934 front part of Stenson House to be used for meetings and civic functions.

== Demography ==
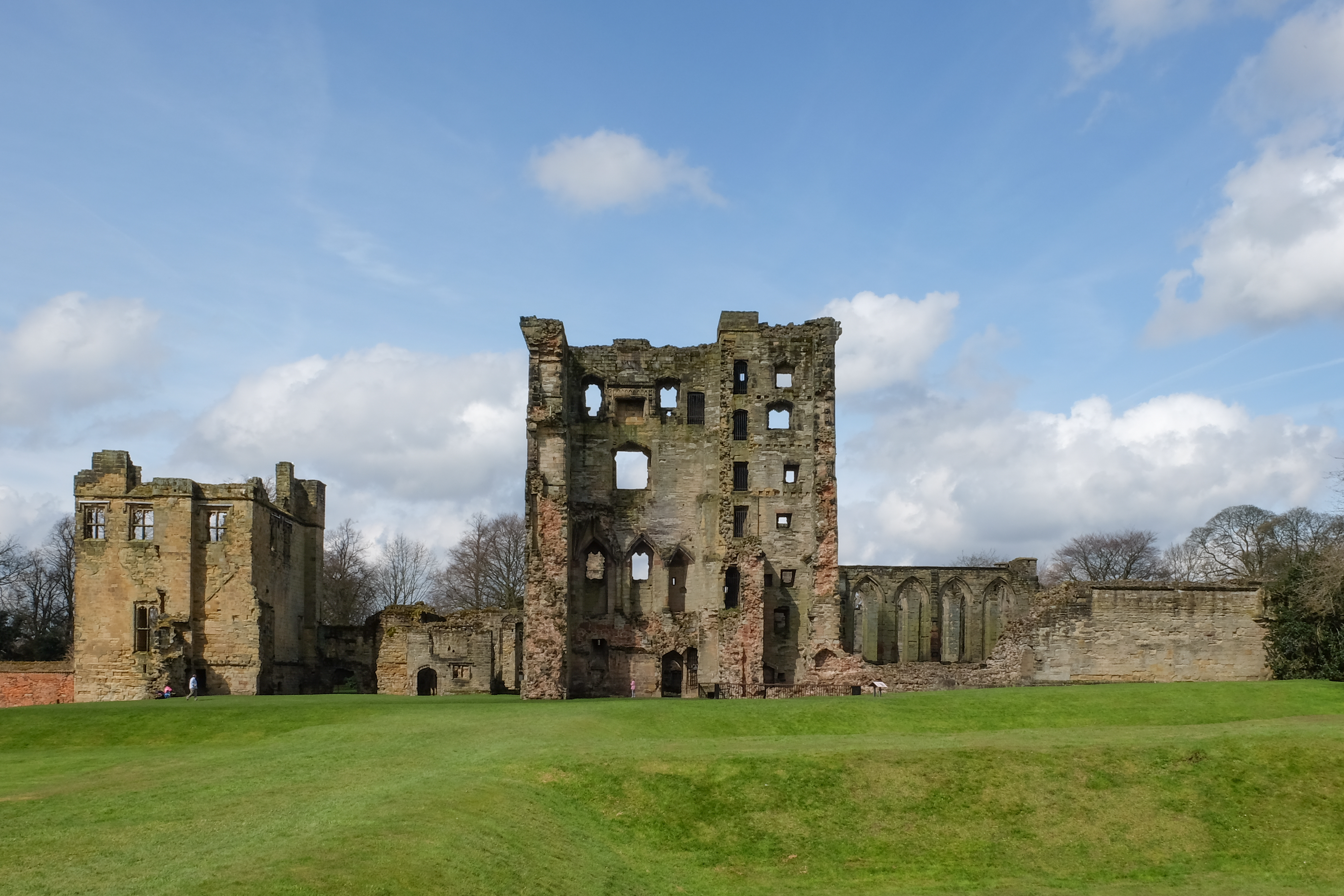
Ashby-de-la-Zouch, best known for Ashby Castle and the second-largest town in the district

Population growth in North West Leicestershire
Year	1951	1961	1971	1981	1991	2001	2011	2016	2021	2031
Population	64,892	65,615	71,671	78,048	80,550	85,485	93,348	98,600	101,500	107,000
Census								ONS	ONS Projections	

North West Leicestershire has experienced steady population growth in recent times as the district balances the agro-rural economy with the end of labour-intensive deep coal-mining. Alternative employment opportunities exist within the district in the services and distributive sectors, together with local or nearby manufacturing and extractive/transformative/construction industries. The lack of rail services to/from Leicester, Loughborough and other nearby centres limits access for employment, commerce and leisure to a road journey that competes with freight and heavy-haulage vehicles especially to the south and east.

== Economy ==
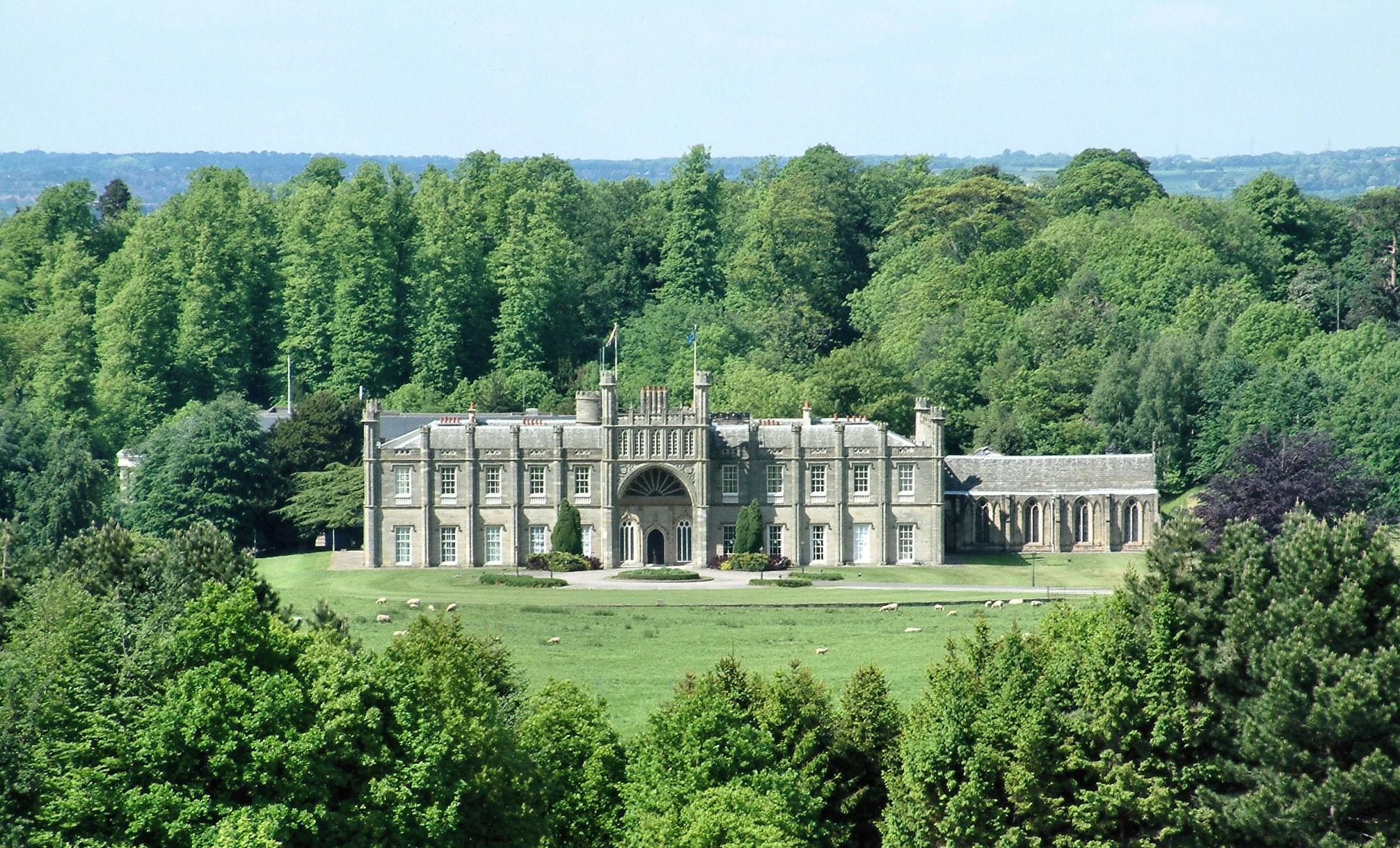
Donington Hall, headquarters of Norton Motorcycles, formerly of BMI

Since 2013 Norton Motorcycles has its head office in Donington Hall, Castle Donington. BMI (British Midland), an airline, was headquartered in Donington Hall. The airline moved its headquarters to Donington Hall in 1982. The subsidiary bmibaby also had its head office in Donington Hall.

Prior to its disestablishment, Excalibur Airways had its head office on the grounds of East Midlands Airport in Castle Donington. Prior to its disestablishment, Orion Airways had its head office on the grounds of East Midlands Airport.

In 2011 Coalfield Resources plc were given permission to develop an opencast coal mining pit on the site of the former Minorca colliery between Measham and Swepstone on a seam which will be 1 mi (1.6 km) across and extract 1,250,000 tonnes (1,380,000 tons) of coal over five years, and 250,000 tonnes (280,000 tons) of clay.

== Media ==
In terms of television, the area receives better TV signals from the Sutton Coldfield TV transmitter which broadcasts BBC West Midlands and ITV Central (West) from Birmingham. Some eastern parts of the district are still able to receive the Waltham TV transmitter to get BBC East Midlands and ITV Central (East) from Nottingham.

Radio stations for the area are:

- BBC Radio Leicester
- BBC Radio Derby can also be received
- Capital Midlands
- Smooth East Midlands
- Greatest Hits Radio Midlands
- Community based stations are Fosse FM and Coalville Public Radio.

== Parishes ==
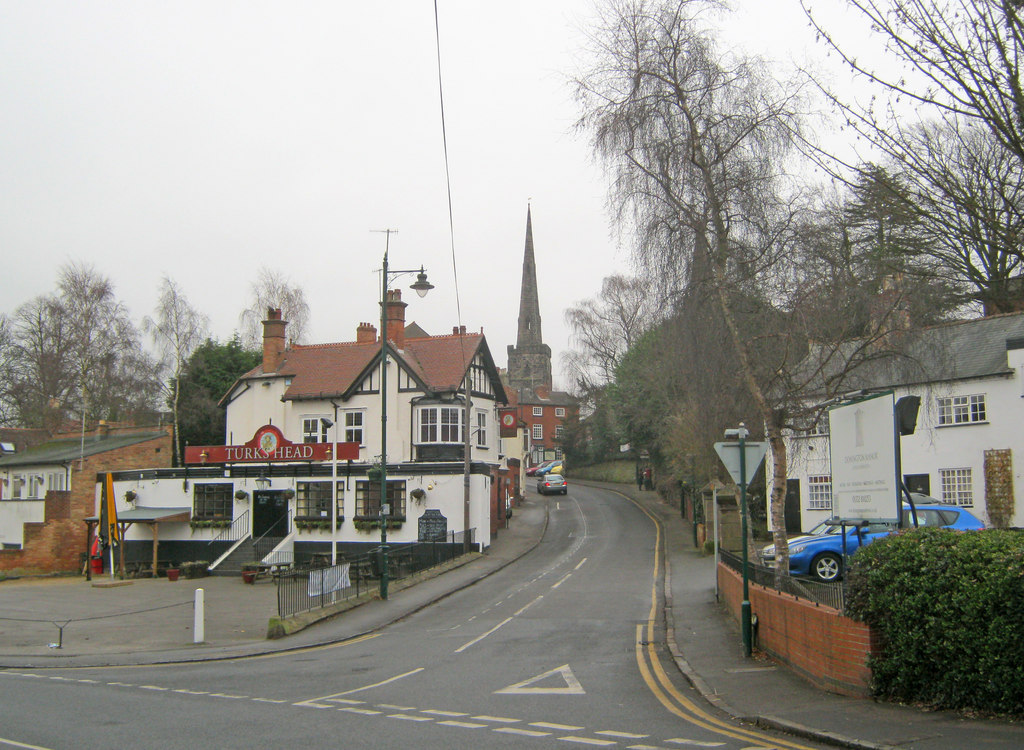
Castle Donington

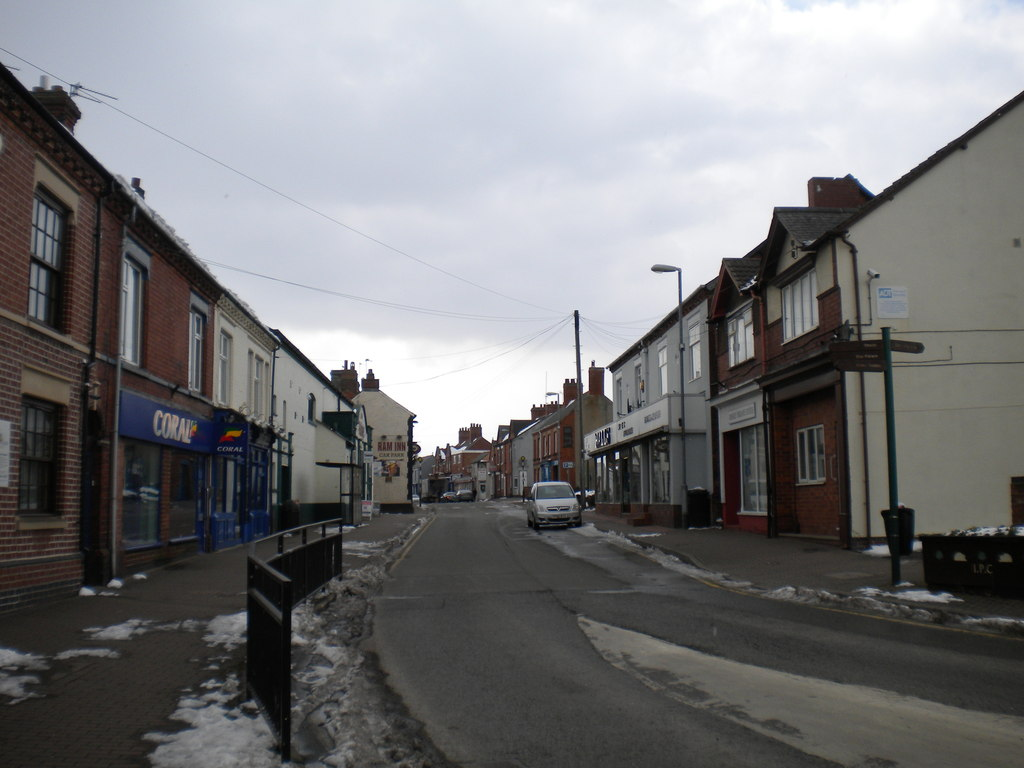
Ibstock

Most of the district is covered by civil parishes. Parts of the former Coalville Urban District covering the main part of Coalville and the Thringstone area are unparished areas. The parish councils for Ashby-de-la-Zouch and Ashby Woulds have declared their parishes to be towns, allowing them to take the style "town council". (Whilst Ibstock is a post town and Castle Donington is sometimes called a town, neither parish council has formally declared them to be towns.) The parishes are:

- Appleby Magna, Acresford, Ashby Woulds, Ashby-de-la-Zouch
- Bardon, Belton, Breedon on the Hill
- Castle Donington, Charley, Chilcote, Coleorton, Coalville
- Ellistown and Battleflat
- Heather, Hugglescote and Donington le Heath
- Ibstock, Isley cum Langley
- Kegworth
- Lockington-Hemington, Long Whatton and Diseworth
- Measham
- Normanton le Heath
- Oakthorpe, Donisthorpe and Acresford, Osgathorpe
- Packington
- Ravenstone with Snibston
- Snarestone, Staunton Harold, Stretton en le Field, Swannington, Swepstone
- Whitwick, Worthington

== Coat of arms ==
Coat of arms of North West Leicestershire

Notes
Granted 30 October 1974
Crest
On a wreath Argent Sable and Vert within a circlet of six lozenges conjoined Sable flames Proper issuant therefrom a demi-Lion Or gorged with a collar Gules bezanty and holding a Hhxagon Argent charged with a maunch Sable.
Escutcheon
Per chevron Argent and Sable in chief two ash trees couped and in base on a granite rock issuant Proper a castle of three towers Argent on a chief Vert between two garbs a mitre affrontée Or charged with two crosses formy Gules.
Motto
Ex Terra Opes (From The Earth Wealth)
