= Thringstone Halt railway station =

Former railway station in England

Coordinates: 52.7503°N 1.3640°W

Thringstone Halt railway station was a station on the Charnwood Forest Railway. Near the village of Thringstone, Leicestershire at 52.7503354N 1.3638816E. On the outskirts of Whitwick. Opened in 1907 as a stop on the line between Loughborough Derby Road and Coalville East.

The station closed in 1931 when passenger services on the line with withdrawn. Today, the cutting and halt have been filled in but the bridge carrying a minor road over the halt is still visible.

== Route ==
Preceding station	Disused railways	Following station
Whitwick; Line and station closed	London and North Western Railway; Charnwood Forest Railway	Grace Dieu Halt; Line and station closed
