= Grace Dieu Halt railway station =

Disused railway station in England

Grace Dieu Halt railway station was a station on the Charnwood Forest Railway. At 52.761485°N 1.354311°E near the hamlet of Grace-Dieu, Leicestershire. On the outskirts of Whitwick. Opened in 1907 as a stop on the line between Loughborough Derby Road and Coalville East.

The station closed in 1931 when passenger services on the line with withdrawn.

Preceding station	Disused railways	Following station
Thringstone Halt; Line and station closed	London and North Western Railway; Charnwood Forest Railway	Shepshed; Line and station closed
