= Shepshed railway station =

Former railway station in Leicestershire, England

Shepshed

General information
- Location: Shepshed, Borough of Charnwood; England
- Coordinates: 52.7626°N 1.2943°W
- Platforms: 2

Other information
- Status: Disused

History
- Original company: Charnwood Forest Railway
- Pre-grouping: London and North Western Railway
- Post-grouping: London, Midland and Scottish Railway

Key dates
- 16 April 1883: Station opened
- 13 April 1931: Station closed
Location

Shepshed railway station was a station on the Charnwood Forest Railway. Near the town of Shepshed, Leicestershire.

It was opened on 16 April 1883 as a stop on the line between Loughborough Derby Road and Coalville East.

The station closed on 13 April 1931 when passenger services on the line were withdrawn. Today, nothing remains of the station which is now occupied by an industrial estate, although the line is traceable.

== Route ==
Preceding station	Disused railways	Following station
Grace Dieu Halt; Line and station closed	London and North Western Railway; Charnwood Forest Railway	Snells Nook Halt; Line and station closed
