= Snells Nook Halt railway station =

Former railway station in England

Snells Nook Halt

General information
- Location: Loughborough, Charnwood; England
- Coordinates: 52.7621°N 1.2627°W

Other information
- Status: Disused

History
- Original company: Charnwood Forest Railway
- Pre-grouping: London and North Western Railway
- Post-grouping: London, Midland and Scottish Railway

Key dates
- 2 April 1907: Station opened
- 13 April 1931: Station closed
Location

Snells Nook Halt railway station was a station on the Charnwood Forest Railway. Near the village of Nanpantan, on the outskirts of Loughborough, Leicestershire.

It opened on 2 April 1907 as a stop on the line between Loughborough Derby Road and Coalville East.

The halt closed on 13 April 1931 when passenger services on the line were withdrawn. Today, nothing remains of the halt but the line is still traceable.

== History ==
When the M1 motorway was being built, for the ten-mile £6m Markfield to Sawley, Derbyshire section, Sir Robert McAlpine had their site office at the former station. The section was meant to open on August 1 1965, but opened in early December 1965.

== Route ==
Preceding station	Disused railways	Following station
Shepshed; Line and station closed	London and North Western Railway; Charnwood Forest Railway	Loughborough Derby Road; Line and station closed
