= Charnwood Forest Canal =

Canal in the UK

Coordinates: 52°45.4′N 1°20.0′W

The Charnwood Forest Canal, sometimes known as the "Forest Line of the Leicester Navigation", was opened between Thringstone and Nanpantan, with a further connection to Barrow Hill, near Worthington, in 1794.

It marks the beginning of a period of history that saw the introduction of railways to supplement canals and, in the end, superseding them, leading eventually to the Midland Counties Railway. It was also one of the first uses of edge-rails for a wagonway.

(This should not be confused with the Charnwood Forest Railway.)

== Origin ==
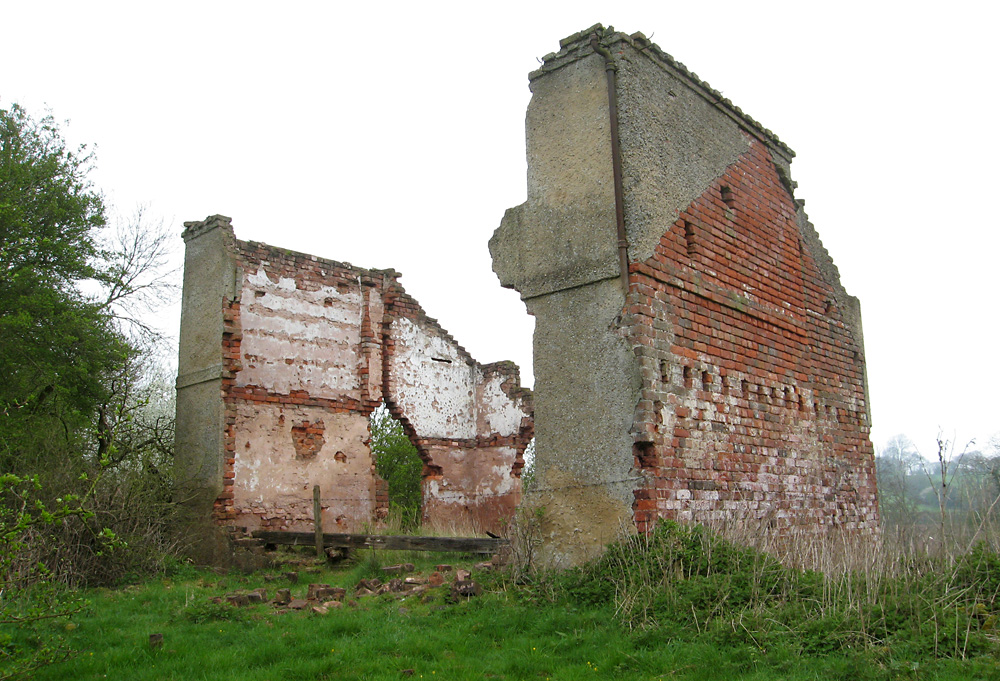
The remains of Junction House alongside the Charnwood Forest Canal, at the junction with the Barrow Hill branch south of Osgathorpe, in 2009. This is the last remaining building of the Charnwood Forest Canal.

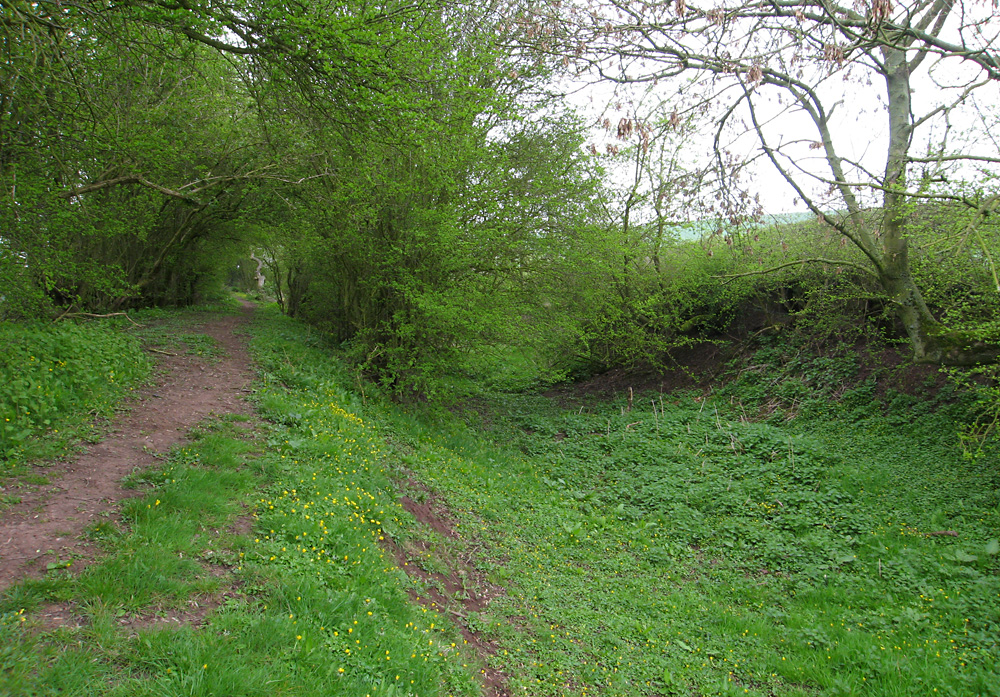
The now derelict and dried up Charnwood Forest Canal south of Osgathorpe

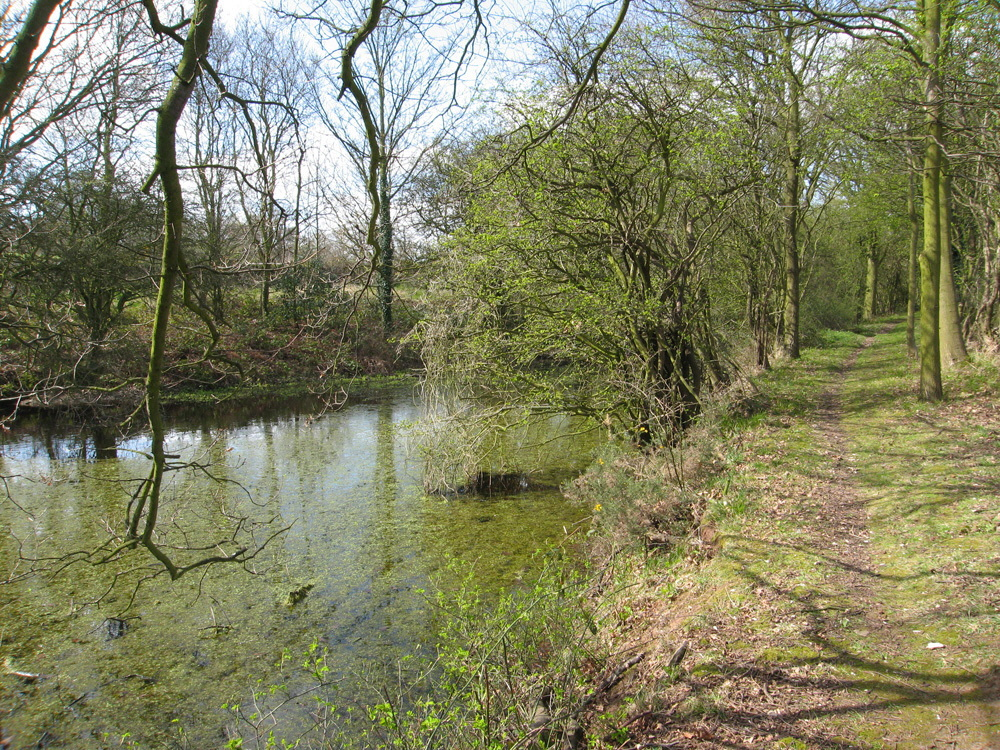
The now derelict Charnwood Forest Canal alongside the entrance to Longcliffe Golf Club in Nanpantan

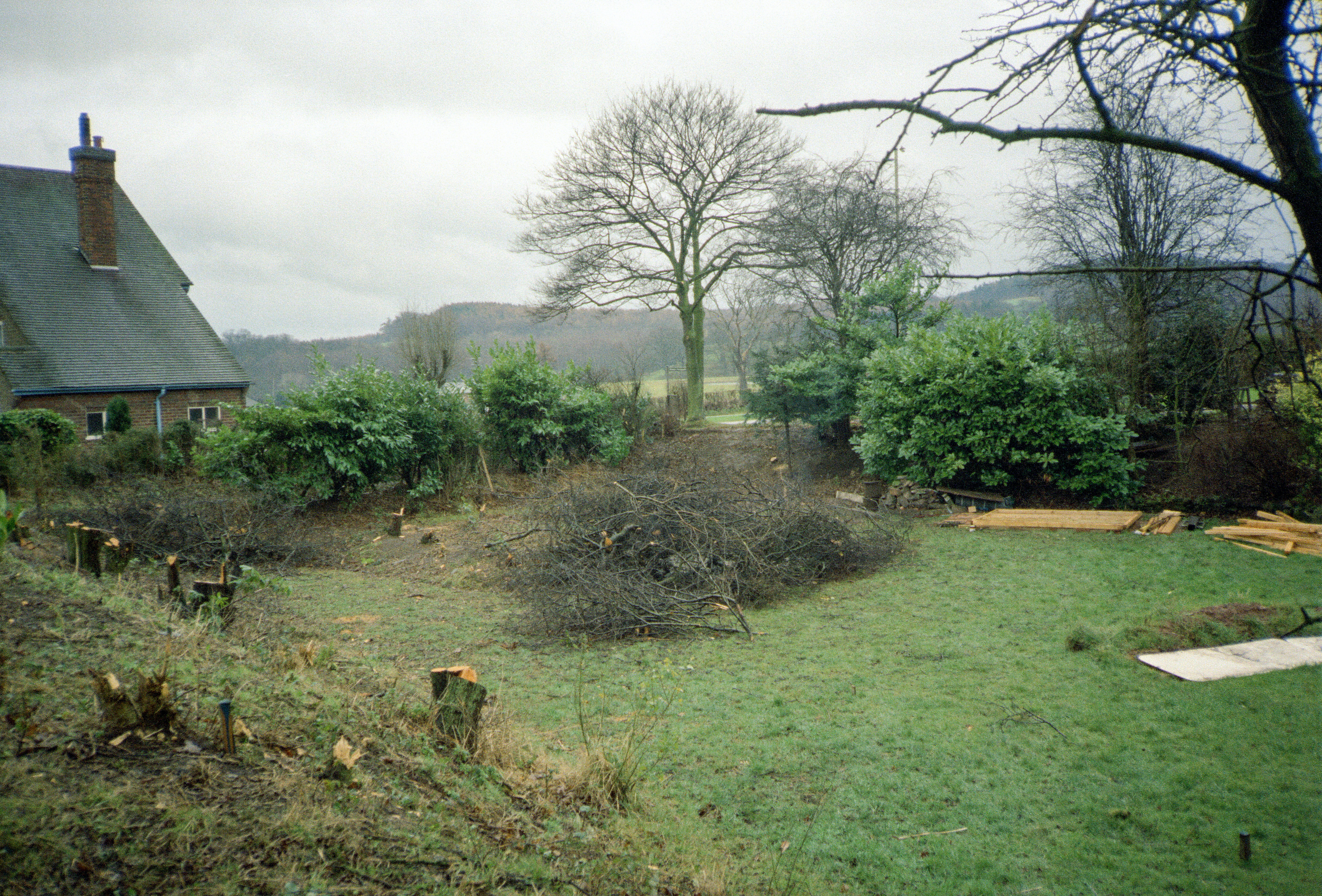
Part of the drained terminus basin of the Charnwood Forest Canal at Nanpantan, Loughborough, being cleared ready for building a dwelling in January 1984, SK506174. Nanpantan Road just visible to right of large tree

Until the end of the eighteenth century the City of Leicester had received its supplies of coal by packhorse from the Charnwood Forest coal mines around Swannington.

However, in 1778, the Loughborough Canal opened up the River Soar from the Trent to Loughborough, and the opening of the Erewash Canal the following year allowed a ready supply of coal from the Nottinghamshire coalfields into Leicestershire at reduced prices.

In 1785, proposals to extend the Loughborough Canal south from Loughborough to Leicester were opposed by the influential Leicestershire coalmasters, even when a canal linking the mining area to the canal at Loughborough was also proposed. Gradually, however, they warmed to the idea and even came to consider a canal of their own linked to either Loughborough or the proposed Ashby Canal. By 1790 serious opposition to a branch canal from Loughborough to the coal field, known as the "Forest Line", had been won over and the following year the Leicester Navigation Company obtained an act of Parliament, the Leicester Navigation Act 1791 (31 Geo. 3. c. 65) to extend the Soar Navigation from Loughborough to Leicester, and to build the Forest Line.

The considerable height difference between Nanpantan and Loughborough would have required a number of locks, for which there was not enough water, so the canal terminated at Nanpantan where goods had to be transhipped onto a horse-drawn wagonway which connected to Loughborough wharf. The tramway was engineered by William Jessop who used an iron edge-rail railway, in contrast to his partner Benjamin Outram, who, for other such lines, preferred the traditional iron L-shaped flange-rail plateway.

Wagonways also linked the other terminus of the Forest Line at Thringstone to the coal mines and to the limestone quarries at Barrow Hill and Cloud Hill.

Considerable difficulties were encountered in constructing both the Soar Navigation and the Forest Line, and it was not until 1794 that they were both opened.

== History ==
Use of the Forest Line was limited until the Blackbrook Reservoir feeder was finished. During the floods of 1799 this collapsed, destroying some earthworks and an aqueduct, and the canal went out of use for two years. Even after some repairs were carried out, further damage occurred and what little trade there had been did not return. Stevenson suggests "the problems ... stemmed partially from the hybrid nature of its construction." That is, it was part canal, part wagonway. However, note that Griffin has suggested that technical, financial and legal problems at the coal mines served by the canal caused the amount of coal to be carried to be reduced to uneconomic levels.

Leicester Navigation Act 1848
- Act of Parliament
- Parliament of the United Kingdom
- Long title: An Act to authorize the Company of Proprietors of the Leicester Navigation to abandon the Railways or Stone Roads and Water Levels commonly known as "The Forest Line," and to enable them to sell the Lands over which the same passes, and the Reservoir and other Works connected therewith.
- Citation: 11 & 12 Vict. c. v

Dates
- Royal assent: 9 June 1848

Text of statute as originally enacted

In 1808 the company sought to abandon the Forest Line but were advised that this would require a costly act of Parliament, so they turned this down, and the unused canal became derelict. In 1830 the Leicester and Swannington Railway was authorised, which greatly affected the transport situation in the area. The canal company was dismayed to receive a formal request by the Earl of Stamford that the Forest Line be put into good order to carry limestone. A proposal was drawn up to convert the canal to a wagonway or railway throughout and a bill was presented to Parliament but was opposed and was not passed. The company tried to sell off the land of the canal piecemeal but this was deemed to be illegal without an act of Parliament. In the end a landowner who wanted to buy some of the land agreed to pay for a private bill and the Forest Line was officially abandoned by the Leicester Navigation Act 1848 (11 & 12 Vict. c. v).

== After the canal's closure ==
It was not until 1832 that the opening of the Leicester and Swannington Railway allowed the Leicestershire miners to regain a competitive advantage. The Nottinghamshire coal miners responded to this by proposing a railway line extending from the Mansfield and Pinxton Railway, which had been opened in 1819. This eventually led to the building of Midland Counties Railway, which became a founding partner in the Midland Railway.

Subsequently the Charnwood Forest Railway (opened in 1883 and closed in 1963) took over part of the route of the Forest Line between Grace-Dieu and Shepshed, including the aqueduct over the Blackbrook.

Remains of the canal can still be seen in places, particularly:

- South of Osgathorpe, a section of the former towpath remains a public footpath from Snarrows Road, Osgathorpe alongside a good section of canal including a length of the junction, past the remains of the canal junction house SK427187;
- Embankments and pond south of Grace Dieu Priory.
- The aqueduct over an accommodation track near the Blackbrook (subsequently modified and widened by the Charnwood Forest Railway) SK459185;
- A section of canal between the aqueduct and Tickow lane
- A section of former towpath in Shepshed between Charnwood Road and Leicester Road;
- The former towpath, now a public footpath from the back gardens of houses on Nanpantan Road, Nanpantan SK505174, over Snells Nook Lane, and across Longcliffe Golf Club SK503175.

== See also ==
- Canals of the United Kingdom
- History of the British canal system
