= Blackbrook Reservoir =

Reservoir in Leicestershire, England

Coordinates: 52.751°N 1.322°W

- Site of Special Scientific Interest
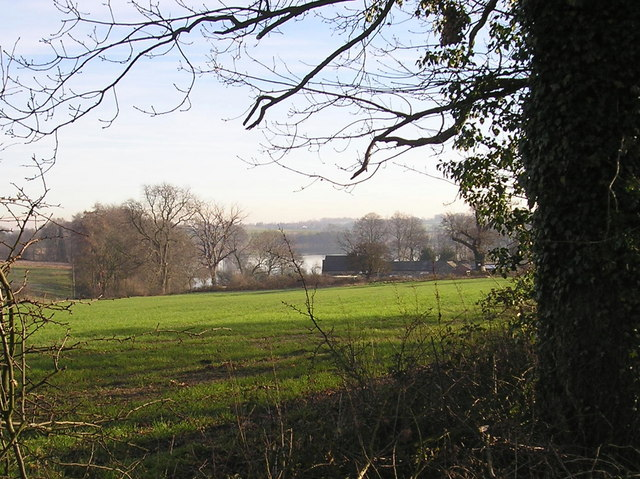
- Location of Blackbrook Reservoir.
- Area of search: Leicestershire
- Grid reference: SK 459 173
- Interest: Biological
- Area: 33.4 hectares
- Notification date: 1985
- Location map: Magic Map

Blackbrook Reservoir is a 33.4-hectare (83-acre) biological Site of Special Scientific Interest between Shepshed and Whitwick in Leicestershire.

The reservoir was constructed in 1796 in order to feed the Charnwood Forest Canal, which has long since vanished. The first dam constructed was an earthworks one, and this failed on 20 February 1799. In eleven minutes the reservoir was empty and as a result local farmland was ruined, sheep were drowned, and much of Shepshed and nearby Loughborough were affected by flood waters. The dam was repaired in 1801, but the canal was no longer commercially viable.

The present gravity dam was constructed in 1906 and was officially opened by the first Mayor of Loughborough Joseph Griggs. In 1957 the dam felt the effects of a magnitude 5.3 earthquake. The tremors caused heavy coping stones to shift and cracks appeared in the faces of the dam.

The reservoir has a plant community on its margins which is unique in the Midlands and only found in a few northern sites. Its unusual mix of flora includes Juncus filiformis at its most southern locations, and the lake itself has native white-clawed crayfish, where it is isolated from the invasive American signal crayfish.

One Barrow Lane crosses the south-eastern end of the reservoir. The lane is carried by the One Barrow Viaduct, a blue brick construction consisting of three arches. Previously it served as the entranceway drive to the now demolished One Barrow Lodge Farm. This is a public footpath which eventually leads you out on the Oaks Road, near Mount St Bernard Abbey.

The dam and reservoir is managed by Severn Trent and is currently in a redundant state. There is strictly no access to the dam which is on private land – a part of the Grace Dieu & Longcliffe Estate.

== See also ==
- Canals of the United Kingdom
- History of the British canal system
