= Gabriel Holland =

- Died: 1761
- Occupations: Clockmaker, mine entrepreneur

Gabriel Holland (died 1761) was an English watch and clock maker (Note: Some of Holland's clocks are signed "Gabril Holland") active in Coventry, subsequently a coal mine proprietor at Swannington in Leicestershire, and a Quaker.

He was declared bankrupt in 1760.

== Clock-making ==
Holland worked as a clock and watch maker in Coventry, England.

A tall case clock by Holland is in the collection of Princeton University Art Museum. Others have been sold at auction by Christie's and Heritage Auctions. He is also known for a surviving early tavern clock.

A newspaper report of 1742 related that:

Coventry Nov. 13. We hear that Mr. Gabriel Holland, Watch Maker in this City, has just compleated in Miniature, that noble and useful Engine for raising Water (out of Coal and other Mines) by Fire, and we hope to have a correct and satisfactory Description of its Principles demonstrated by him in a Course of Mechanical and Experimental Philosophy.

== Coal mining ==
In October 1751, Holland agreed to take over the remaining ten and a half years of the lease of coal mines at Swannington, Leicestershire, (Note: Swannington is around 26 miles (42 km) from Coventry.) from William Newarke and Christopher Cooke. He obtained financial support from Isaac Dawson, a lawyer from Ashby-de-la-Zouch. The deal was not a good one for Holland, as the coal was mostly worked-out, and he was obliged to invest heavily to reach deeper seams, putting him further into debt. In 1760, he was responsible for the "sinking" of two new coal pits on Swannington Common, which were drained by a fire engine.

John Nichols quotes at length from an even longer letter circulated by Holland some time in 1760, describing the work he had undertaken, and his financial difficulties, with anticipation of imminent profits resulting in payments to his creditors. By February 1760, however, Holland was declared bankrupt.

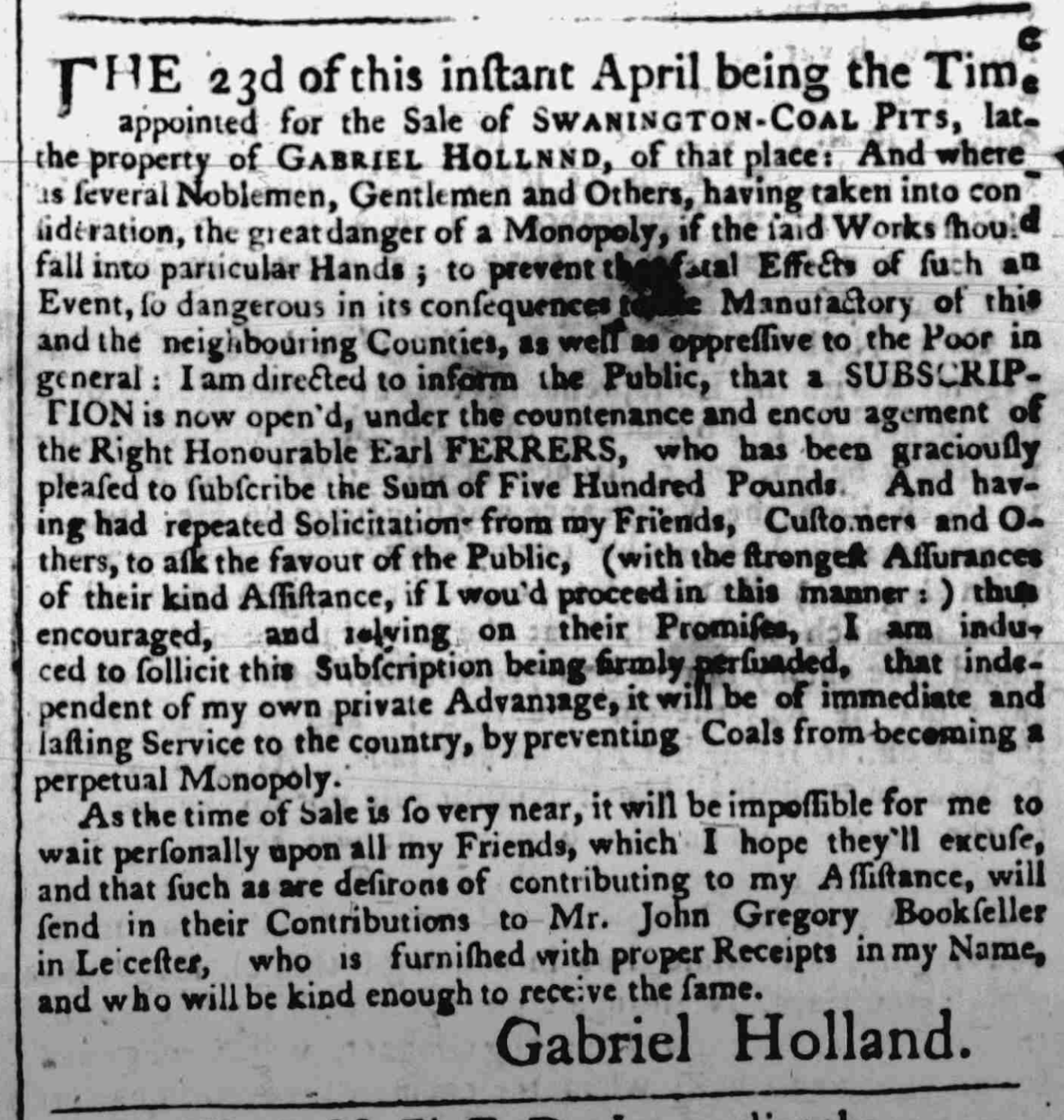
Notice by Gabriel Holland on page 2, col. 3, of the Leicester Journal, 4 April 1761 (Note: The depicted text uses the "long s". For "ſ", read "s".)

In April 1761, he published a notice in the Leicester Journal, calling on his friends and supporters to subscribe to a fund established with the assistance of Washington Shirley, 5th Earl Ferrers, to repurchase his mines, in order to prevent them becoming part of a monopoly. He also took legal action to try to nullify the bankruptcy assignees' (Note: What we would today call administrators.) sale of the mines to someone called Boltby.

By September 1761 he was listed as "deceased".

After his death, Richard Holland, who may have been a relative, together with Isaac Dawson, attempted unsuccessfully to purchase the mines. Bankruptcy proceedings were continuing as late as April 1786.

== Personal life ==
Holland was a Quaker.

He was married in 1741, to Esther, the daughter of Priscilla, née Moseley, and the late Edward Muggleston, Quaker farmers at Swannington. Priscilla provided financial assistance to Gabriel.

Gabriel was survived by his mother-in-law, as well as his wife and their only child, also Priscilla.
