= Osgathorpe =

Village in England

Coordinates: 52.77139°N 1.36408°W

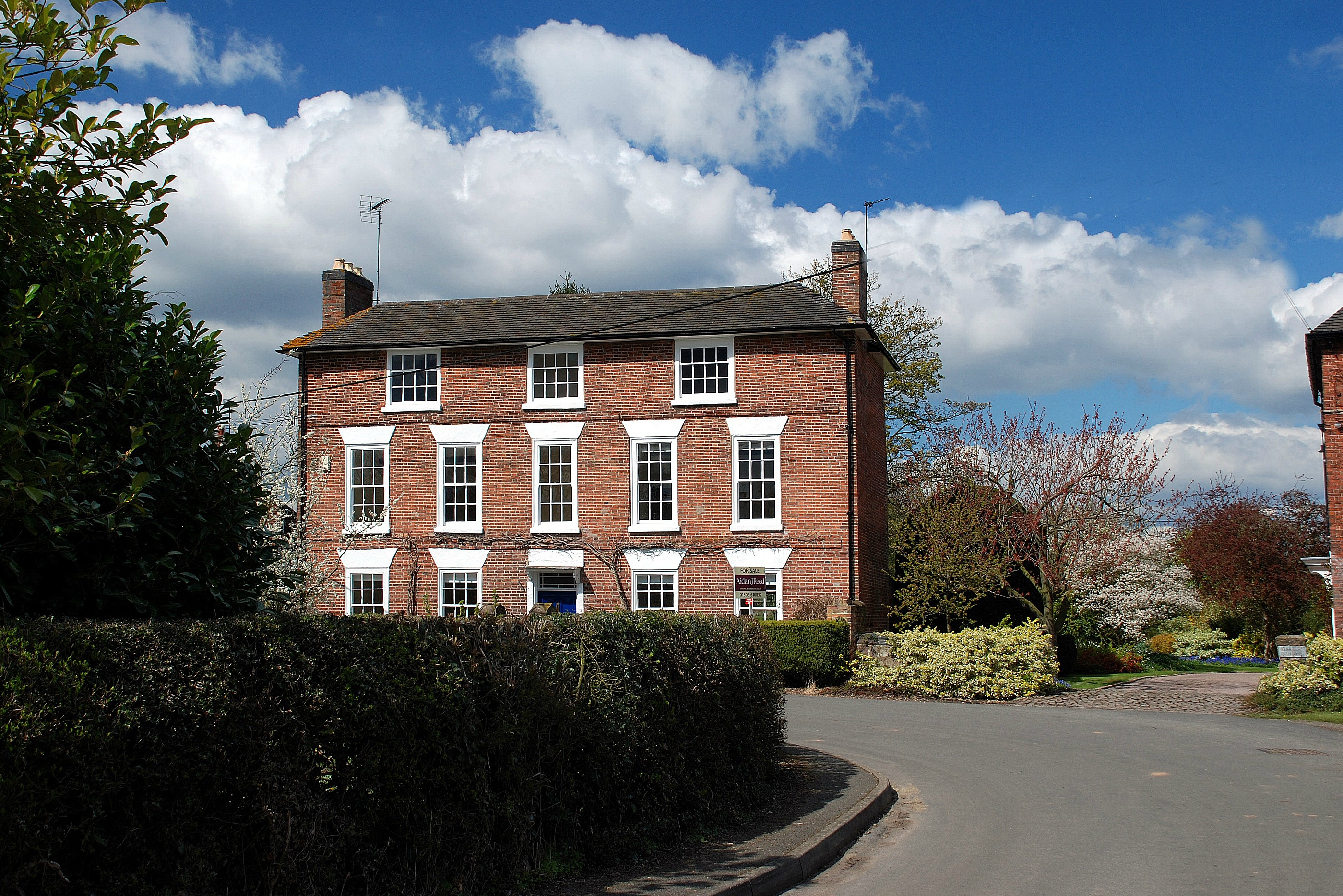
- Hallington House, Osgathorpe. A Grade II listed building.

- Location within Leicestershire
- Population: 411 (2011 Census)
- District: North West Leicestershire
- Shire county: Leicestershire
- Region: East Midlands
- Country: England
- Sovereign state: United Kingdom
- Post town: LOUGHBOROUGH
- Postcode district: LE12
- Police: Leicestershire
- Fire: Leicestershire
- Ambulance: East Midlands
- UK Parliament: North West Leicestershire

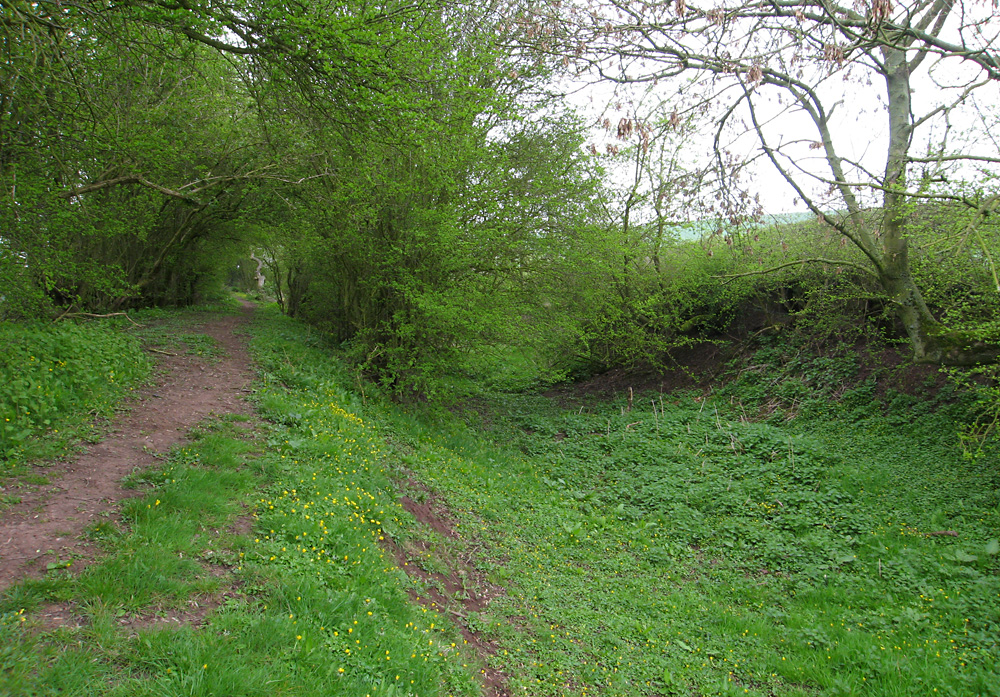
The now dried up Charnwood Forest Canal south of Osgathorpe.

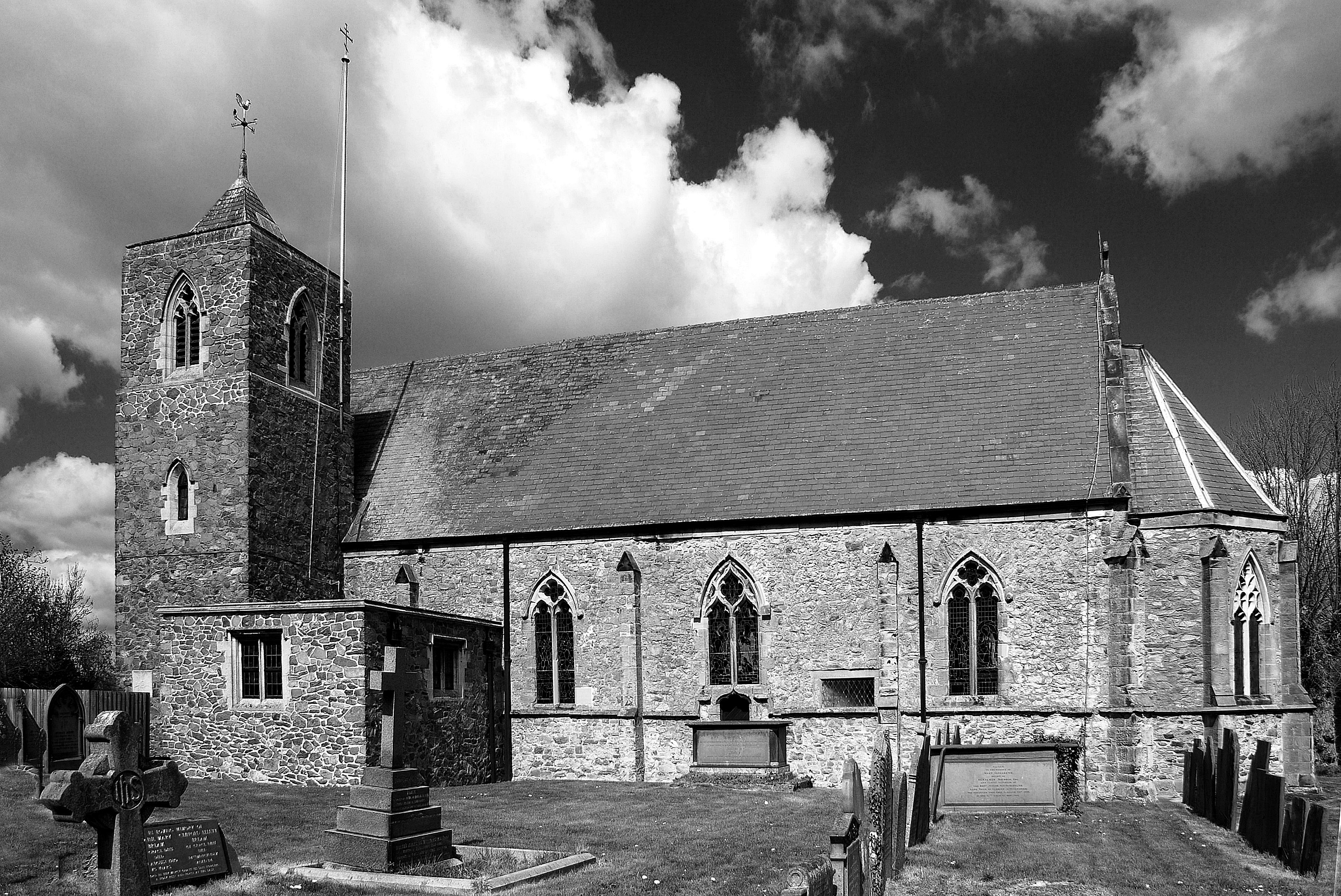
Church of Saint Mary the Blessed Virgin

Osgathorpe is a small village which lies in a fold of the hills in North West Leicestershire, England, and is about a quarter of a mile from the A512 Coalville to Loughborough Road. The civil parish population at the 2011 census was 411.

The parish church is dedicated to Saint Mary the Blessed Virgin and dates from the fourteenth century. It was heavily restored in the nineteenth century, with the addition of a polygonal apse to the chancel. A tower with a small pyramid turret was built at the south west corner of the church in around 1930 and contains two bells, which are rung using a clocking method. There are pleasing north and south windows to the nave and chancel, and in the south wall of the nave can be seen a very unusual hagioscope (or squint), which is set diagonally within the stonework, to allow a view of the altar.

Opposite the church is the village school, built in 1670, with almshouses of the same date. There is also a good example of a sixteenth-century yeoman farmer's house just southwest of the church, with a fine Swithland slate roof.

Remains of a stretch of the long-abandoned Charnwood Forest Canal can be seen alongside a footpath to the south of the village, running from Thringstone to an area known locally as 'The Snarrows'.

The Storey Arms was a popular working class pub but now struggles to attract drinkers due to the clampdown on drink driving and the other pub the Royal Oak closed in 2000.

== Notable people ==
- William Dennis Elcock, 11 December 1910. PhD Romance specialist on Béarnese and Aragonese of the Spanish and French central valleys of the Pyrenees. Died in London on 7 October 1960.
- Olly Hilton, radio presenter and producer, lived in the village from 2011 to 2021.
