= William St Lucien Chase =

Recipient of the Victoria Cross

William St. Lucien Chase VC CB
- Colonel William St. Lucien Chase
- Born: 2 July 1856; St Lucia, British West Indies
- Died: 24 June 1908 (aged 51); Quetta, North West India
- Burial place: English Cemetery, Quetta Cemetery, Pakistan
- Military career
- Allegiance: United Kingdom
- Branch: British Indian Army
- Service years: 1875–1908
- Rank: Colonel
- Units: 15th Regiment of Foot; Bengal Staff Corps; 28th Bombay Native Infantry
- Conflicts: Second Anglo-Afghan War; Chin-Lushai expedition First Mohmand Campaign; Tirah Campaign
- Awards: Victoria Cross; Order of the Bath

Colonel William St. Lucien Chase VC CB (2 July 1856 – 24 June 1908) was a recipient of the Victoria Cross, the highest and most prestigious award for gallantry in the face of the enemy that can be awarded to British and Commonwealth forces.

== Early life ==
Chase was born in Saint Lucia, West Indies, on 2 July 1856. After attending the Royal Military College, Sandhurst, he was commissioned in September 1875 as a lieutenant in the 15th Foot (East Yorkshire Regiment). In May 1878 he joined the Bengal Staff Corps and transferred to the Indian Army.

== VC action ==
Chase was 24 years old, and a lieutenant in the Bengal Staff Corps, serving with the 28th Bombay Native Infantry (Pioneers), British Indian Army during the Second Afghan War. On 16 August 1880 at Deh Khoja, near Kandahar, Afghanistan, Chase, with the help of Private Thomas Elsdon Ashford, rescued a wounded soldier and finally brought him to a place of safety. Both he and Private Ashford were awarded the VC for their actions. The citation in The London Gazette of 7 October 1881 stated:

For conspicuous gallantry on the occasion of the sortie from Kandahar, on the 16th August, 1880, against the village of Deh Khoja, in having rescued and carried for a distance of over 200 yards, under the fire of the enemy, a wounded soldier, Private Massey, of the Royal Fusiliers, who had taken shelter in a blockhouse. Several times they were compelled to rest, but they persevered in bringing him to a place of safety.

William Chase was invested with his Victoria Cross by the General Officer Commanding Bombay at Poona, India, on 23 January 1882.

== Later service ==
Chase served as a staff officer with the Zhob valley expedition in 1884, and was promoted to captain in 1886. In August 1889 he re-joined the 28th Bombay Infantry, with which he took part in the 1889–90 Chin-Lushai expedition; and on the north-west frontier in 1897–8, including the Mohmand and Tirah campaigns. Promoted major in 1895, he took command of the 28th Bombay Infantry in June 1899, with the temporary rank of lieutenant-colonel. He was created a Companion of the Order of the Bath in 1903.

Chase was promoted to brevet colonel in September 1904 and substantive colonel in April 1906. In 1908 he was selected to command the Faizabad brigade. He however died of brain disease on 30 June 1908, aged 51, before he could take up the post. He was buried in the English Cemetery at Quetta, now in Pakistan:

The medal is now on display in the Army Museum of Western Australia, Fremantle.
