= Thomas Ashford =

Recipient of the Victoria Cross

Thomas Elsdon Ashford VC
- Born: 1859; Newmarket, Suffolk
- Died: 21 February 1913 (aged 53–54); Whitwick, Leicestershire
- Burial place: Whitwick Cemetery
- Military career
- Allegiance: United Kingdom
- Branch: British Army
- Service years: 1877–1889
- Rank: Private
- Units: Royal Fusiliers
- Conflicts: Second Anglo-Afghan War
- Awards: Victoria Cross
- Other work: Postman

Thomas Elsdon Ashford (1859 – 21 February 1913) was an English recipient of the Victoria Cross, the highest and most prestigious award for gallantry in the face of the enemy that can be awarded to British and Commonwealth forces.

== Early life ==
He was born in 1859 at 2 Peck's Cottage, All Saints, Newmarket, Suffolk, the illegitimate son of Thomas Ashford, a boot maker and Emma Elsdon. Thomas joined the Army at Woolwich for the 49th Brigade on 12 June 1877.

== The VC action ==
He was about 21 years old, and a private in The Royal Fusiliers, British Army during the Second Anglo-Afghan War when the following deed took place for which he was awarded the VC.

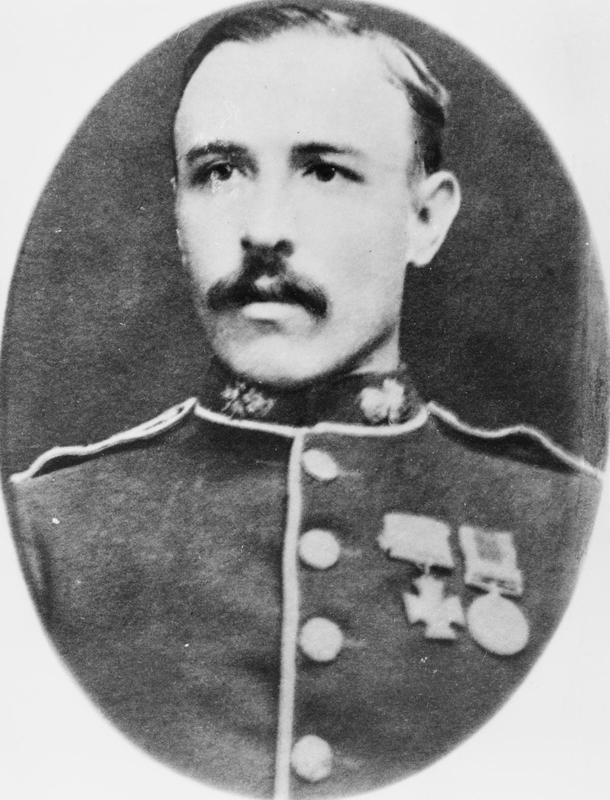
Pte Thomas Ashford VC, c1880 (IWM HU71321)

On 16 August 1880 at Deh Khoja, near Kandahar, Afghanistan, Private Ashford assisted Lieutenant William St. Lucien Chase in rescuing and carrying for a distance of over 200 yards under the fire of the enemy, a wounded soldier who had taken shelter in a block-house and finally brought the wounded man to a place of safety. His citation read:

For conspicuous gallantry on the occasion of the sortie from Kandahar, on the 16th August, 1880, against the village of Deh Khoja, in having rescued and carried for a distance of over 200 yards, under the fire of the enemy, a wounded soldier, Private Massey, of the Royal Fusiliers, who had taken shelter in a blockhouse. Several times they were compelled to rest, but they persevered in bringing him to a place of safety.

After his military service, Ashford settled in Thringstone, Leicestershire and served as a postman for many years. He was married in Thringstone Church to Betsy Ann Sisson on 29 January 1891. He later moved to the neighbouring village of Whitwick and died on 13 February 1913. He was laid to rest in Whitwick Cemetery, in the presence of thousands of mourners, though the grave lay unmarked for many years, until a monument was provided by the local British Legion. Three streets in Whitwick have since been named in his honour.

== The Medal ==
His Victoria Cross is displayed at the Royal Fusiliers Museum in the Tower of London.
