= Nanpantan Reservoir =

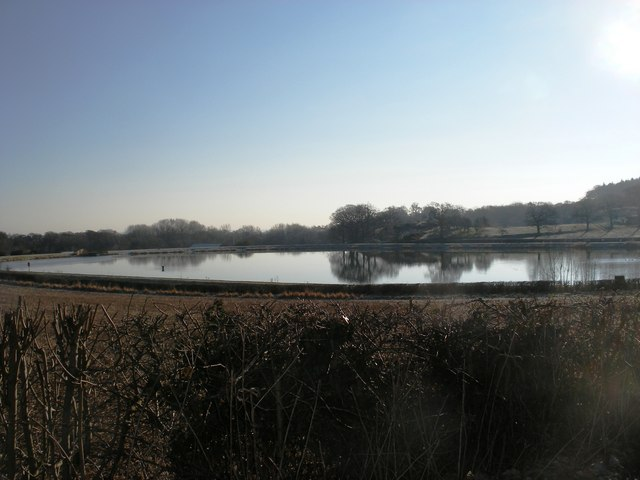
- Nanpantan reservoir

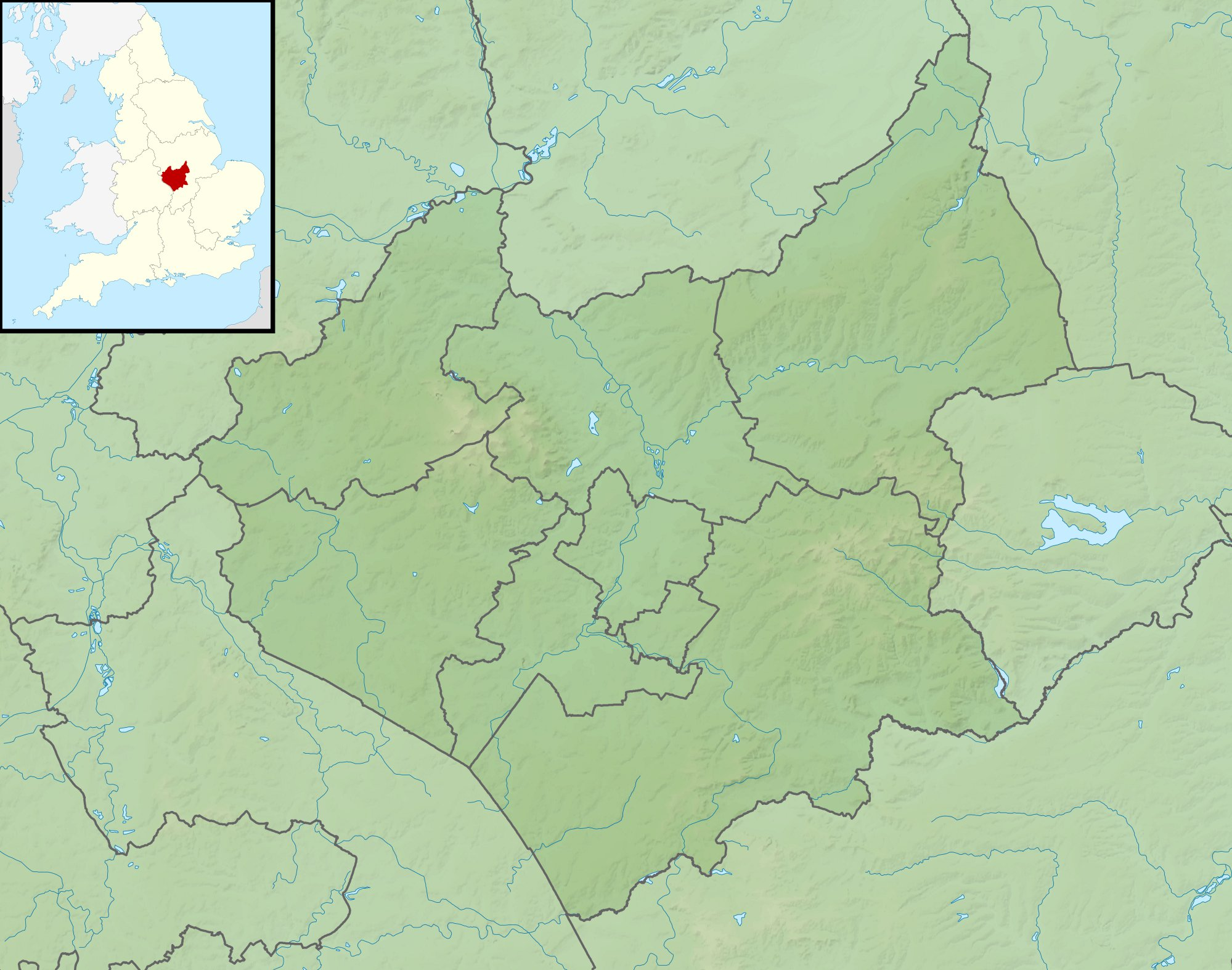
- Location within Leicestershire Location within England Location within the United Kingdom
- Location: Leicestershire
- Coordinates: 52°44′56.00″N 1°15′0.00″W
- Type: reservoir
- Built: 1870
- Water volume: 132,000 cubic metres (29,000,000 imp gal)

Nanpantan Reservoir is a reservoir in Leicestershire, near Nanpantan. The reservoir, with a capacity of 132,000 cubic metres (29,000,000 imp gal), was built in 1870 to provide drinking water for Loughborough. It is owned by Severn Trent.
