= Thringstone =

Village in Leicestershire, England

Coordinates: 52.75571°N 1.36573°W

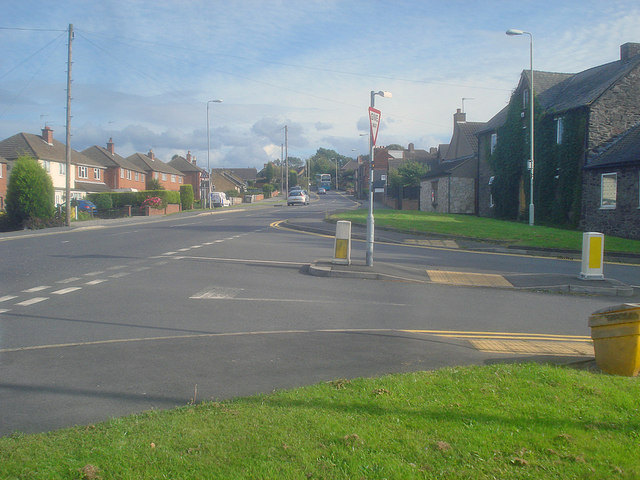
- Junction of Talbot Lane with Talbot Street

- Location within Leicestershire
- Population: 4,367 (2001 Census)
- OS grid reference: SK425175
  - London: 115 miles (185 km)
- District: North West Leicestershire
- Shire county: Leicestershire
- Region: East Midlands
- Country: England
- Sovereign state: United Kingdom
- Post town: Coalville
- Postcode district: LE67
- Dialling code: 01530
- Police: Leicestershire
- Fire: Leicestershire
- Ambulance: East Midlands
- UK Parliament: North West Leicestershire

Thringstone is a village in the North West Leicestershire district, in Leicestershire, England. About 3 miles (4.8 km) north of Coalville, it lies in the English National Forest.

Until 1875, Thringstone had been a township within the ancient parish of Whitwick. The township of Thringstone, based on a feudal (manorial) division of land carved out during the Anglo-Saxon period, comprised Thringstone village (then known as South Thringstone) and the hamlets of Peggs Green and Rotten Row in an area known as North Thringstone. Thringstone became an independent and autonomous civil parish in 1866, though this was dissolved on 1 April 1936 when outlying parts of the parish were transferred to Belton, Coleorton, Osgathorpe, Swannington and Worthington and the remainder was transferred to the civil parish and Urban District of Coalville. In 1931 the parish had a population of 1,566. The geographical area known as Thringstone today bears little resemblance to that known as Thringstone before World War II. In 2023, Thringstone is not part of a civil parish.

== Demographics ==
The 2001 population of 4,325 compares with 901 in 1801 - the growth in population being a result of the industrial revolution, particularly local coal-mining. However, due to radical boundary changes in the nineteenth and twentieth centuries, such demographic comparatives relate to significantly different geographical areas. The most tangible way of understanding the population growth relevant to the place defined as Thringstone since World War II is that evidenced by large-scale residential development in the village proper, from the late nineteenth century. If it were not for the evolution of the coal-mining industry and related migration, it is quite probable that the village would have remained a rural and sparsely populated community. A notable demographic impact on the village, connected with coal-mining, also occurred during the 1960s, when many families migrated to the village from Scotland and the North East of England as a result colliery transfers, resulting in the creation of the Woodside Estate. Following the demise of the local coal-mining industry, population has been sustained due to the development of alternative commerce in nearby towns and cities, easily accessed by improvement in transport.

== Geology ==
Lying on the western fringe of Charnwood Forest is a geological structure, not exposed at the surface, known as the Thringstone Fault. Formed during prehistoric volcanic times, the fault runs from Bardon Hill to Ticknall and forms an abrupt boundary to the eastern part of the Leicestershire and South Derbyshire coalfield.

== History ==
The name Thringstone is probably derived from an amalgamation of the Danish (Viking) personal name, Traengr (this area having come under the Danelaw during the 9th century) with the Anglo-Saxon suffix, tun, meaning 'farm' or 'village' - hence Traengr's tun. Another source suggests that 'Thring' may mean land that was difficult to work. Thringstone is mentioned in the Domesday survey of 1086 as the Derbyshire village of "Trangesbi".

A water-mill existed here in the 13th century and survived till about 1935. Some dilapidated outbuildings and the old dry mill race remain. Grace Dieu Priory was built at about the same time.

In 1309 the Manor of Thringstone passed into the hands of one Robert Tebbe. In 1360, it is recorded that Adam, son of Robert Tebbe, was the owner of the Manor and water-mill of Thringstone. In 1391, Henry Tebbe of 'Threnguston' had a violent quarrel with the Benedictine priory of Upholland in Wigan. Tebbe, who farmed part of the Whitwick tithes, refused to pay, was arrested, but on paying a fine was pardoned and released.

In 1462, King Edward IV granted land at Thringstone previously in the possession of John Beaumont to Richard Hastings. However the manor was back with the Beaumont family by 1494, when Thomas Beaumont was in possession and by 1550 it had passed to another John Beaumont. In 1552, this Beaumont, who had been given the office of Master of the Rolls, was 'discovered to have grossly wronged the King', having purchased for himself lands with royal funds, amongst a host of other dishonest deeds. Beaumont subsequently surrendered his possessions to the King and in 1553, the Manor of Thringstone was granted to Francis, Earl of Huntingdon. It was this same John Beaumont who, in 1534, had abused his position as one of the commissioners appointed to visit Gracedieu Priory following its dissolution, by buying the nunnery buildings at his own valuation. When his misbehaviour at the Treasury was uncovered twenty years later, Gracedieu was also granted to the Earl of Huntingdon, though Beaumont's widow managed to regain possession of it in 1574.

The Manor of Thringstone is recorded as having been the property of Henry, Earl of Huntingdon in 1640. A return of the year 1564 states that there were in that year 26 families in Thringston (sic), 17 in Whitwick and 25 in Swannington. The district had been devastated by the Black Death a century before, and this accounts for the very small population.

In 1846 it is recorded that "J. Boultbee, Esq., is lord of the manor; but the greater part of the soil belongs to E. Dawson, Esq., and the Cropper, Piddocke, Green and other families". In 1871, the Lord of the Manor is recorded as T. Boultbee, Esq.

== 19th- and 20th-century expansion and boundary changes ==
Population would have grown significantly during the 18th century, when Thringstone and Whitwick became concerned with the framework knitting industry. The work was carried by journeymen to and from the manufacturers in Loughborough and Shepshed. In 1844, Thringstone is recorded as having 160 frames.

In 1776, the workhouse at Thringstone was noted as being capable of receiving thirty persons. The expansion of the local coal mining industry, beginning in the first third of the 19th century, induced still further demographic change and the population had grown from a figure of 901 in 1801 to 1,298 by 1851, of which some 52% was non-native to the village, having migrated here from other areas.

In 1885, the parish was reduced in size to enlarge Coleorton Civil Parish with the area known as "Rotten Row". But by far the most radical geographical and social changes to the village came during the 20th century, beginning in the years after World War I. In April 1936, Thringstone Civil Parish was dissolved and outlying parts of the township were transferred to Belton (68 acres), Coleorton (98 acres), Osgathorpe (482 acres), Swannington (70 acres) and Worthington (12 acres). The remainder of Thringstone (142 acres) was transferred to the Urban District and Civil Parish of Coalville.

Thus, the old parish of Thringstone had a much larger area than that known as Thringstone today, having also included the hamlet of Peggs Green. The village proper that we now refer to simply as 'Thringstone', was at that time referred to as 'South Thringstone', with outlying parts known as 'North Thringstone'. The boundary changes, dissolving an ancient manorial division of land, meant two notable landmarks formerly classed as being in Thringstone were ceded to other villages - namely the Stordon Grange moated farmhouse (to Osgathorpe) and the Thringstone Smock Mill (to Swannington, and now known as the Hough Windmill).

Following World War II, Thringstone village grew massively due to homogeneous estate housing developments. The Booth Road area was begun in the forties, followed shortly afterward by the Hensons Lane prefabs. The Woodside Estate was completed in 1964, bringing a large influx of families from Scotland and north-east England into the village as a result of northern colliery transfers. This estate is characterised by its Caledonian road-names such as 'Melrose Road' and 'Elgin Walk' ('Shrewsbury Walk' is the anomaly, named in honour of Thringstone's longest serving vicar, who died in 1958). The Carterdale complex was also begun in the sixties and the Glebe Farm estate came in the seventies, with the Springfield development arriving in the eighties.

To some extent, Thringstone has become an extension of Coalville (within living memory, it was relatively isolated) although, thanks to contiguity with Gracedieu Wood and the preservation of other greenbelt areas, it manages to retain something of an individual identity and has not been absorbed into the urban sprawl of Coalville to the same degree as parts of Whitwick, Snibston and Hugglescote.

== Character and buildings of interest ==
A walk along Brook Lane, The Green, Main Street and Lily Bank reveals some pleasing domestic architecture, ranging from the 17th century to present day. One of the oldest properties - The Gables on Main Street is thought to date from the mid-17th century and an extension to the west bears the date, 1682, carved into a stone recess. The Gables is one of several buildings with Grade II listed status. Others are The Old Manor House on Brook Lane (formerly thatched, 17th century); Forest View House (adjoining the now demolished Rose and Crown public house on The Green, with blind central windows, possibly bricked up to avoid window tax, three-storeyed, 18th century); St Andrew's Church, Main Street (by St Aubyn, 1862; the tomb of Charles Booth in the church yard is also a listed monument); Lily Bank Farmhouse (17th/18th century) and Lily Bank Dovecote to the rear (18th century). Some of these, and other houses and buildings of interest in the village, have recently been provided with blue plaques.

== Thringstone School ==
The old schoolhouse on Main Street was built in 1844 on land donated by E. M. Green, Esq.; a plaque can still be seen above the main entrance reading, 'Fear God Honour The King. South Thringstone National School. AD 1844'. This was a Church of England school until transferred to Leicestershire County Council in 1950. Few buildings can have had such varied usage as this over the years: the building was originally also used for Anglican services on Sundays, until the parish church of Saint Andrew was opened in 1862. A new county school was built off John Henson's Lane in 1967, at which point the old premises was sold for industrial usage. It served as a small hosiery factory until the 1980s, after which it was converted into a restaurant, operating under a succession of names, including Lal Quila (Indian); La Dolce Vita (Italian) and School Cross (English). For several years now, the building has been used as a residential home for adult individuals with learning disabilities.

== The Charnwood Forest Canal (Thringstone to Nanpantan) ==
Small coal workings existed in the area from medieval times, but until the 20th century, the coalfield was hampered in its competition with the Derbyshire and Nottinghamshire fields even for the Leicester market owing to poor transport facilities. Toward the end of the 18th century Joseph Boultbee, the tenant of collieries at Thringstone, and others fought to change this and were successful in getting opened the Charnwood Forest Canal between Thringstone and Nanpantan in 1794.

Horse-drawn tramroads were built to transport coal mined at Swannington and Coleorton to the canal wharf at Thringstone Bridge, and once at the Nanpantan terminus the coal was re-loaded on to a further stretch of tramroad to take it to the main navigation at Loughborough. These railroads are said to have been the first in the world to use the standard gauge, and a deep cutting left by one of its branches can still be found in the field at the back of the Glebe Road housing estate in Thringstone.

The cost of three transhipments of coal between trucks and barges meant that the Leicestershire pits were still unable to compete with their Derbyshire rivals and in February 1799 the canal's feeder reservoir at Blackbrook burst its banks following exceptionally severe frosts, causing much damage to the canal and surrounding countryside.

That proved to be the last straw for the Leicestershire coal-owners and the getting of coal hereabouts was to remain a modest concern until the arrival of the Leicester and Swannington Railway some thirty years later.

The expansion of the local coal-mining industry from around 1830 onward had a big impact on population. The population of Thringstone in 1801 was 901. This had grown to 1,298 by 1851, of which some 52% were non-native to the village, having migrated here from other areas. The coal-mining era came to an end in North West Leicestershire during the 1980s.

== Bauble cottage industry ==
Thringstone was once the centre of another industry unique to this part of Leicestershire, and which still leaves its mark in the name of 'Bauble Yard'. Bauble was the local term for a variety of alabaster ornaments, some manufactured by John Tugby in around 1850 at Pegg's Green, which was then in Thringstone parish. The alabaster came from Derbyshire. Another bauble firm was Peters and Son, who came to Thringstone from Coleorton in 1870 and set up their works in what became the "Bauble Yard". They also kept the Star Inn on Main Street. They made plates, jugs, views, egg-cups and other trinkets which were sold at the local monastery. Others were exported to America and some sold at fairs and at the seaside and the industry flourished for some years. It eventually came to an end around 1900 in the face of cheap imports from the European continent.

== Saint Andrew's Parish Church ==
Saint Andrew's Church is a small cruciform structure built in 1862 entirely from Charnwood Forest stone in the Early English style. The building was designed by James Piers St Aubyn (1815–1895) and has an unusual plan, consisting of a broad nave with shallow transepts and a round-ended sanctuary, with a round-ended vestry on its north side. A small bell-cote containing one small bell sits at the western end of the nave roof and a south porch was added in 1911, in memory of the first vicar, Edwin Samuel Crane, MA, designed by Thomas Ignatius McCarthy of Coalville.

The church was paid for by grants and public subscription, zealously elicited by Francis Merewether, MA (Vicar of Whitwick and Rector of Coleorton) and cost £750 12s, building work being undertaken by the firms of Messrs William Beckworth of Whitwick and Elliott of Ashby-de-la-Zouch/Burton. Merewether was a theologian of markedly low church views who preached and wrote prolifically against Ambrose de Lisle's Roman Catholic mission and was incensed by such developments as the founding of Mount Saint Bernard Monastery in his parish and the opening of a Roman Catholic day school at Turry Log, within the township of Thringstone, in 1843. There can be little doubt that, quite apart from the rapid population growth that affected the area following the opening of large collieries, Merewether was motivated to build the church (and also a school) to help counteract the perceived papist revival. Merewether - along with Sir G H Beaumont (ninth Baronet of Coleorton Hall) - was the chief benefactor of Saint Andrew's Church, each donating £100.

Until 1875, the building acted as a chapel of ease to Whitwick and was served by curates under the jurisdiction of the Whitwick vicars. Thringstone became an independent ecclesiastical parish on 29 October 1875, since which time there have been nine incumbents. Despite becoming a parish in its own right, the church at Thringstone retained the ecclesiastical title, Whitwick Saint Andrew-cum-Thringstone until the 1980s.

The church was one of forty-two nationally in the patronage of Her Majesty The Queen (in Right of her Duchy of Lancaster). She has since been succeeded by King Charles III.

The church contains some stained glass by Kempe and Co, including the War Memorial Window, unveiled in 1920 by Lt Col Tom Booth DSO of Gracedieu Manor. This window was originally intended as a personal memorial to Theophilus Jones, the Thringstone headmaster and depicts St Alban (Britain's first Christian martyr). This subject would almost certainly have been chosen to parallel Mr Jones' equally unenviable place in British history: he is commonly believed to have been the first soldier to be killed on home soil during World War I, being killed during the German Bombardment of the Hartlepools, 16 December 1914. [Other sources suggest that he was amongst the first four to be killed during this particular incident]. By the end of World War I, a further 26 men from the parish had fallen, and it was decided to dedicate the window to their collective memory. The names of the fallen are commemorated on a brass tablet and a second tablet was added in 1948 to commemorate the four men from the parish who died in World War II. Relatively few men from the Thringstone district enlisted in the armed services during World War II due to the country's need for increased coal production.

Another military hero, Thomas Elsdon Ashford V.C. was married in Thringstone Church to Betsy Ann Sisson in 1891. Elsdon had been decorated with Britain's highest military honour following an act of bravery whilst serving as private soldier in the Royal Fusiliers in 1880, during the Second Anglo-Afghan War.

In 2003, the building's impressive truss rafter roof was restored to its original appearance, having been substantially boarded over in 1952 as part of a cost-cutting exercise. The roof and the building's semi-circular sanctuary combine to afford an extremely attractive interior, whilst externally, the building's simple pointed style and use of local granite is also aesthetically pleasing and the building is perhaps most commonly described as, 'pretty'.

During the incumbency of Revd Alan Burgess, the church was provided with small extensions on its north side to incorporate kitchen and toilet facilities. The Victorian pipe organ of 1882 was also dismantled and its frontage refashioned to frame a replacement Allen electronic organ.

The churchyard contains the graves of at least twenty-three men and boys who died through accidents in the local coal mining industry. Youngest of these was John Albert Gee (aged 13), who - along with 34 others - lost his life in the Whitwick Colliery Disaster of 1898. Also in the churchyard is the final resting place of the Rt Hon Charles Booth PC (1840–1916), the philanthropist and pioneer of old age pensions. Mr Booth was a regular worshipper at St Andrews Church and two of his daughters were married here He is buried with his wife, Mary Catherine (1847–1939), who was one of the distinguished Macaulay family and their simple, recumbent marble tombstone carries an inscription, raised in lead, summarising Booth's work and which is often sought out by visitors. The tomb was designated a listed monument in 2002, along with the church building itself. Elsewhere, a plaque to Booth's memory can be found in the crypt of St Paul's Cathedral London. Booth purchased a copy of Holman Hunt's famous painting, The Light of the World and presented it to the cathedral in 1904. Holman Hunt's widow was among hundreds of mourners at Booth's funeral in 1916.

Buried in the graveyard are the first two Vicars of St Andrews Church - Edwin Samuel Crane MA (1845–1907) and his eventual son-in-law, Cheverton Shrewsbury MA (1872–1958), whose combined incumbency spanned a remarkable 81 years.

The large red-brick, six-bedroomed parsonage house (by Henry Robinson of Derby, 1878–79) was demolished in 1999 and the site has since been developed by the Badgers Croft complex. The vicarage has since transferred to Whitwick.

=== Vicars of Thringstone ===
There have only been nine Vicars of Thringstone in 140 years

Vicar/Rector	From	Until	Notes
Edwin Samuel Crane, MA	1876	1907	Mission Curate, 1873 - 1876, Died in office. Son, Revd A.N Crane, later Vicar of Bardon Hill and Rural Dean.
Cheverton Shrewsbury, LTh, MA	1908	1954	Longest serving vicar - 46 years. Died 1958
Lawrence James Chesterman, AKC	1955	1960	
Richard Frederick Willis	1961	1969	Previously Rector of Bruntingthorpe.
Archibald Benjamin Pettit	1969	1977	
Brian Matthews	1978	1997	Previously curate of Whitwick and priest-in-charge, Bardon Hill.
Simon Paul Moult, BA	1999	2005	Also Rural Dean. Thringstone became joint benefice with Swannington during this time.
Alan James Burgess	2006	2016	Thringstone and Swannington also joined with Whitwick during this time; vicarage transferred to Whitwick.
Elizabeth Patricia Angell	2016	Present	Appointed as Rector of Whitwick, Thringstone and Swannington.

== Methodism ==
A primitive methodist chapel was opened on Loughborough Road, near to The Green, in 1863. A contemporary newspaper account of the opening reads, 'the comfort of the worshippers has been taken into account by the introduction of two gas stoves... and the chapel is to be lighted with a handsome gas chandelier of twelve burners'. The erection of the primitive chapel was followed by the opening of a Wesleyan Methodist chapel almost directly opposite in 1872. The two movements were united nationally in 1932, after which time the chapels at Thringstone became known respectively as the Loughborough Road and Main Street Methodist Churches.

This arrangement was continued until about 1964, at which point the old Wesleyan chapel was sold off for industrial usage. The Loughborough Road Church was then used by the amalgamated congregations and still exists as the Thringstone Methodist Church. This premises was extended by the addition of a hall and connecting corridor at the rear in 1975. The former Wesleyan chapel was occupied by a number of knitware companies before opening as The Chapel Fitness Centre in 1996.

In August 2021 the Chapel closed for good and with the enclosed grounds was put up for sale

== Thringstone House Community Centre ==
In 1901 Charles Booth purchased an 18th-century farm house on The Green, known as 'Thringstone House', for the purpose of providing local inhabitants with a meeting place for social, recreational and educational activity. This venture, which became known as the 'Thringstone House Club', proved so successful that in 1911 Booth engaged his cousin, the architect Harry Fletcher of London to add the imposing two-storeyed hall to the rear of the premises and founded The Thringstone Trust, a registered charity. The Trust deed states that the institute and its grounds shall be used in perpetuity for the benefit of the inhabitants of Thringstone and the surrounding parishes of Whitwick, Swannington, Worthington, Osgathorpe, Coleorton and Belton. Booth bestowed an endowment of £3000 and a further endowment of £400 was later made by Mrs Booth for the women's section.

By 1950, trust monies left by the Booth family were insufficient for all that was needed in changed times; moreover, members of the Booth family had left the area and it was impossible for them to maintain an active status as trustees. Trusteeship of the institute was transferred to the Leicestershire County Council. The institute is now known as the Thringstone House Community Centre and a member of the Booth family (James Gore Browne) remains as honorary president of the institute, which proudly lays claim to be the oldest of its kind in the country. The centre is administered according to the aims and objects of the Thringstone Community Association. It has a strong educational focus and a clear sense of having a community development role.

Architecturally, the community centre buildings have a great deal of character, comprising a gabled, white-washed 17th-century farmhouse fronting The Green with, at the rear, a large two-storeyed hall overlooking the rural valley of Thringstone Brook. The hall carries a louvred ventilation turret on its western gable which, together with brick buttresses erected to reinforce the north and south walls in the late 20th century, gives the building a distinctly ecclesiastical appearance.

Today, there is a great deal of involvement from local people. The centre has a bar which is open every evening providing a setting where people attending activities in the centre can associate at the end of the evening. A warden is employed and has done much to develop activities in the centre. The association has adopted a development plan and is challenging itself to respond to the needs of a community hit hard by the closure of the coal pits and which is also seeing some growth as a number of new estates bring younger people to the community.

== Local government ==
Thringstone is represented on the North West Leicestershire District Council by David Everitt and Leon Spence, who maintain the village's long tradition of electing Labour candidates. Since May 2013 Thringstone is also represented at County Council level by Leon Spence, as part of the Whitwick electoral division. The late Mr Walter Johnson and Mrs Agnes Smith served as district councillors for Thringstone for many years during the twentieth century; Mr Johnson was the grandfather of current Thringstone Councillor, Leon Spence.

== Grace Dieu Priory ==
The ruins of Grace Dieu Priory stand on the outskirts of Thringstone in a valley bounded by a small brook (Grace Dieu Brook) at the edge of Cademan Wood, part of Charnwood Forest, and situated on the A512 road from Loughborough to Ashby de la Zouch, Leicestershire.

The ruins are known as one of the most haunted locations in Leicestershire due to the site's association with a 'White Lady' apparition, most commonly seen drifting across the A512. The most famous sighting is said to have occurred in 1954, when a 'bus driver is said to have stopped to pick up a woman waiting by the shelter opposite the ruins, only to find on drawing up his vehicle that she had vanished. Sightings of unexplained phenomena in this area are well documented and are also referred to in Paul Devereux's book, 'Earth Lights' (1982)

Following its dissolution as a religious house, the priory came into the possession of the Beaumont family, who converted it into a residence, so that the few remaining ruins are partly medieval, but chiefly domestic Tudor (e.g. fireplaces and chimney-stacks). Francis Beaumont, the great Elizabethan dramatist, was born here in circa 1584. In the 1690s, the priory was acquired by Sir Ambrose Phillipps of Garendon Abbey, though by the 1790s the buildings were ruinous, with only two sections still roofed.

== Friends of Thringstone and Whitwick Woods ==
The village is bordered by the Grace Dieu and Cademan Woods. Grace Dieu Wood is traversed by the redundant track bed of the Charnwood Forest Railway, which also passes over an impressive six arch viaduct near the priory ruins. The woodland is noted for vast carpets of bluebells in spring, and the railway was once referred to as 'the bluebell line'.

There is a group of volunteers whose remit is to record flora and fauna, provide education in wood-lore and improve the habitat of the woods from the A512 (Loughborough to Ashby Road), to Swannymote Road and Loughborough Road, Whitwick, with kind permission of the owner, Mr P de Lisle.

== Historic public houses ==
- The Star, Main Street (closed 1928)
- The Three Tuns, Main Street (closed 1931)
- The Fox Inn, Main Street (closed 2008)
- The Rose and Crown, The Green (closed 2009; demolished 2013)

The village boasted a thriving social life in its public houses, especially at weekends, until the end of the 20th century. A particularly memorable event was New Years's Eve (or Hogmanay) – the spirit of the occasion greatly enhanced by residents of Scottish origin – when (at shortly before midnight) the pubs on the village green emptied for a few minutes as hundreds of people converged in a huge circle on The Green to sing 'Auld Lang Syne' around the kilted figure of piper, Sam Jardine.

== Sport ==
There are two football clubs based in Thringstone, Thringstone Miners Welfare and Thringstone Rangers. Thringstone Miners Welfare, renamed in 2000, is the oldest football club in the village and most successful on the local scene. However the club has been in decline since its relegation from the Leicestershire Senior League in 2003.

Ingles Football Club, originally from nearby Shepshed, currently play at the Homestead Road Ground in Thringstone.

== Notable residents ==
- Thomas Elsdon Ashford, VC - Leicestershire's first recipient of the Victoria Cross, married in St Andrew's Church in 1891 and resident for some time at Brook Lane, Thringstone
- Rt Hon Charles Booth, PC - philanthropist and social reformer, pioneer of old age pensions; resident at Gracedieu Manor (1886–1916) and founder of Thringstone House Community Centre
- Mary Elizabeth Grenside Hewett (1857-1892) - educator
- Gary McAllister, MBE - Scotland and Premiership footballer, formerly resident at nearby Gracedieu Warren during the time of his career at Coventry City F.C.
