= Whitwick railway station =

Former railway station in Leicestershire, England

Whitwick

General information
- Location: Whitwick, North West Leicestershire; England
- Coordinates: 52.740843°N 1.356555°W

Other information
- Status: Disused

History
- Original company: Charnwood Forest Railway
- Pre-grouping: London and North Western Railway
- Post-grouping: London, Midland and Scottish Railway

Key dates
- 16 April 1883: Station opened
- 13 April 1931: Station closed
Location

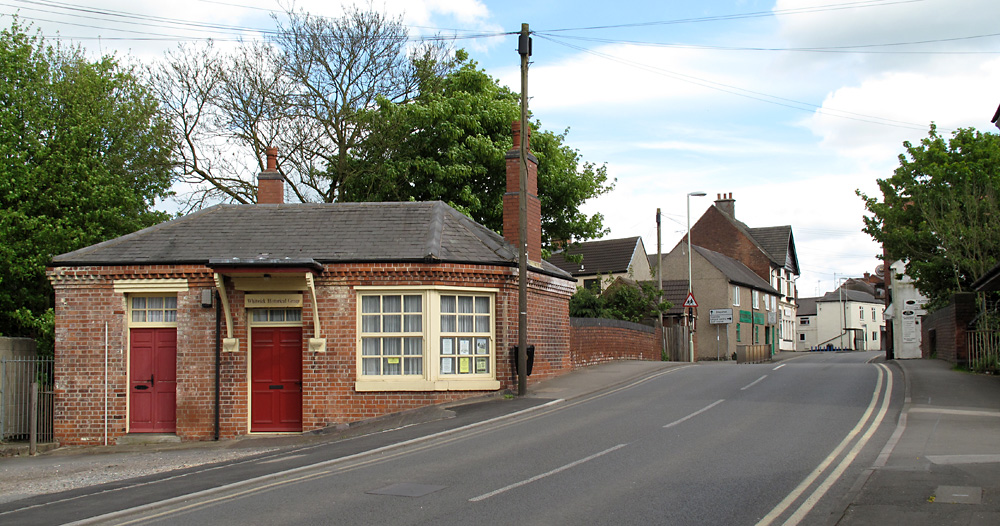
Whitwick station at road level.

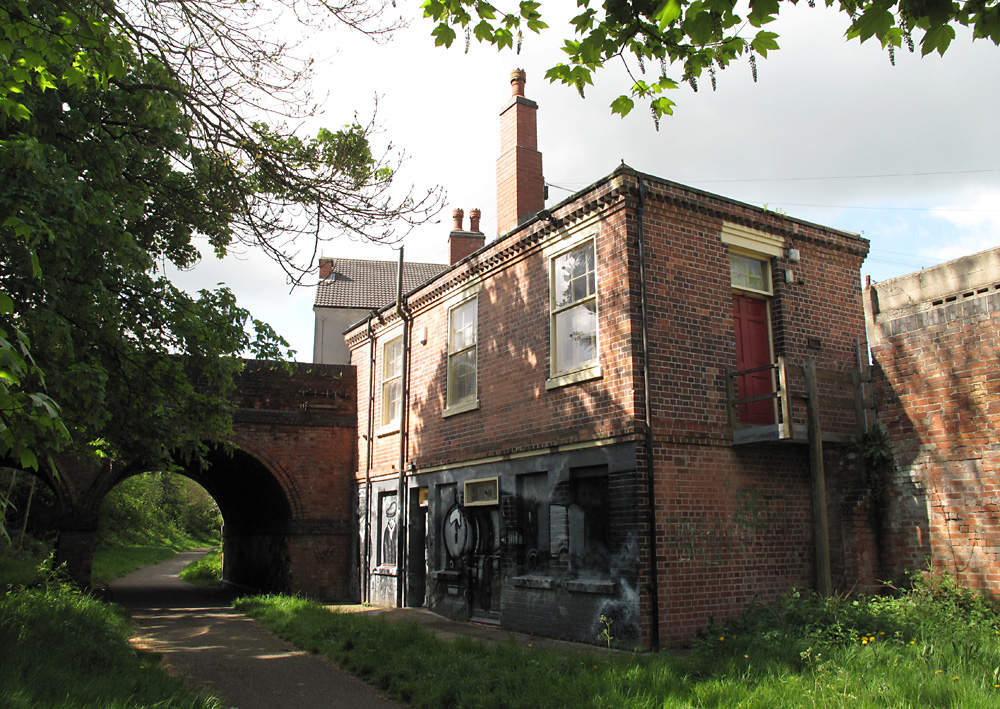
Whitwick station at trackbed level.

Station in 1905.

LNWR Railcar in 1910.

Whitwick railway station served the village of Whitwick, Leicestershire, England. It was built by the Charnwood Forest Company, serving the Charnwood Forest Railway, and was officially opened with the rest of the completed line on 16 April 1883. Following the closure of passenger traffic (aside from a few specials and other organised events) in 1931, the station building became a blacksmiths. Following total line closure in 1963, the history of the building is more difficult to chart. However, it is apparent that the waiting rooms and other facilities on platform level were demolished. In the mid-1970s the Whitwick Historical Group was created, with the old station building becoming their home.

The building is situated close to the village's Market Place, which is essentially the centre of the village, on North Street.

The trackbed between Coalville (starting at Morrisons) and Whitwick (terminating just past Whitwick Station) has been turned into a public right of way. This passes the station building and the remains of the platform which is intact, but overgrown and unkempt. The original staircase which gave passengers access from the road above to the platform was kept in use until the 1990s, however following persistent vandalism and worries over the structure's safety, it was demolished, leaving only the landing at the road entrance.

== Whitwick Historical Group ==
The group now using the station building have repainted it into its former Midland Red and Cream colours. The interior is much changed, with the downstairs rooms now being a kitchenette and dedicated computer room. The main function of this room is to help people trace their family trees with the numerous census materials available. Upstairs, the room contains microfilm and microfiche readers. As the group is largely made up of ex-local miners, it places little emphasis on the Charnwood Forest Line; there are a few photographs.

== Route ==
Preceding station	Disused railways	Following station
Coalville East; Line and station closed	London and North Western Railway; Charnwood Forest Railway	Thringstone Halt; Line and station closed
