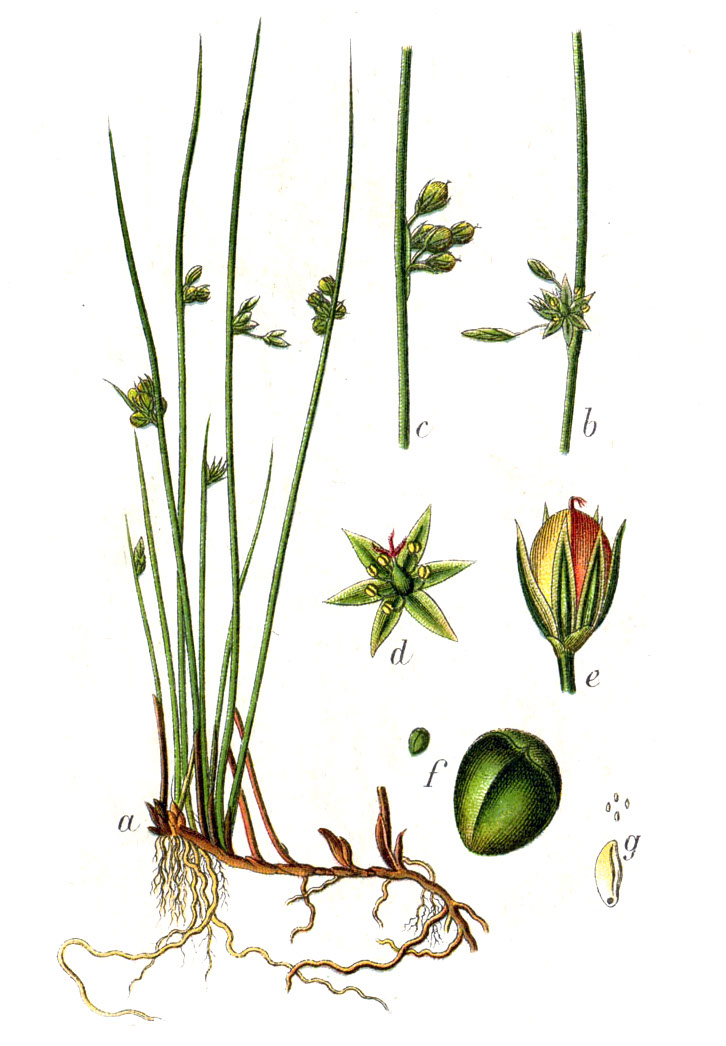
- Botanical illustration
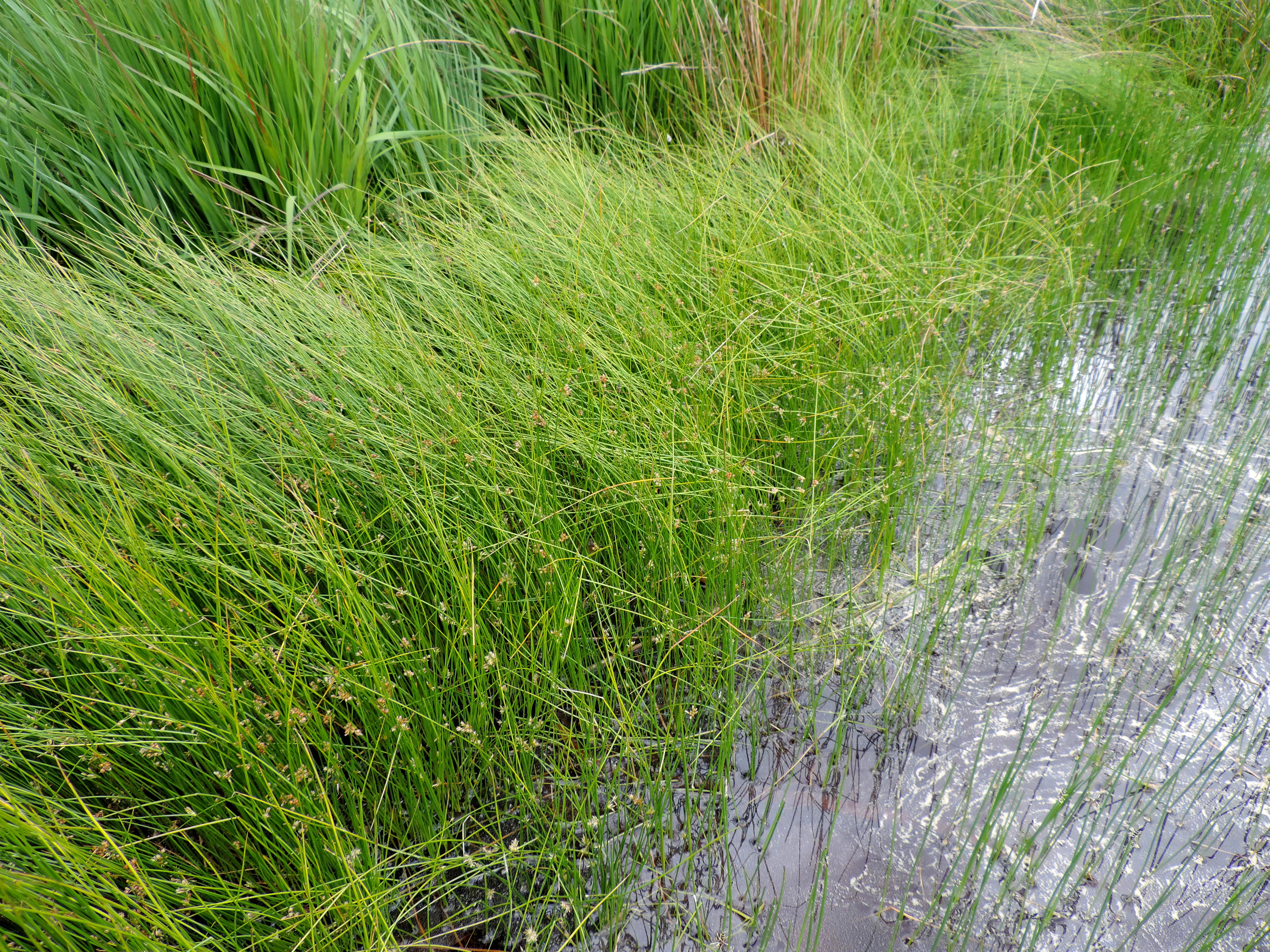
- Habit

Conservation status
- Least Concern (IUCN 3.1)

- Secure (NatureServe)

Scientific classification
- Kingdom: Plantae
- Clade: Embryophytes
- Clade: Tracheophytes
- Clade: Spermatophytes
- Clade: Angiosperms
- Clade: Monocots
- Clade: Commelinids
- Order: Poales
- Family: Juncaceae
- Genus: Juncus
- Species: J. filiformis

Binomial name
- Juncus filiformis L.

Synonyms
- Juncus transsilvanicus Schur; Juncus trichodes Steud.

= Juncus filiformis =

Species of plant

Juncus filiformis, called the thread rush, is a species of flowering plant in the genus Juncus, with a circumboreal distribution. It has been introduced to South Georgia Island. It is typically found in wetlands, on the borders of lakes and streams.
