= Coalville East railway station =

Former railway station in Leicestershire, England

Coalville East
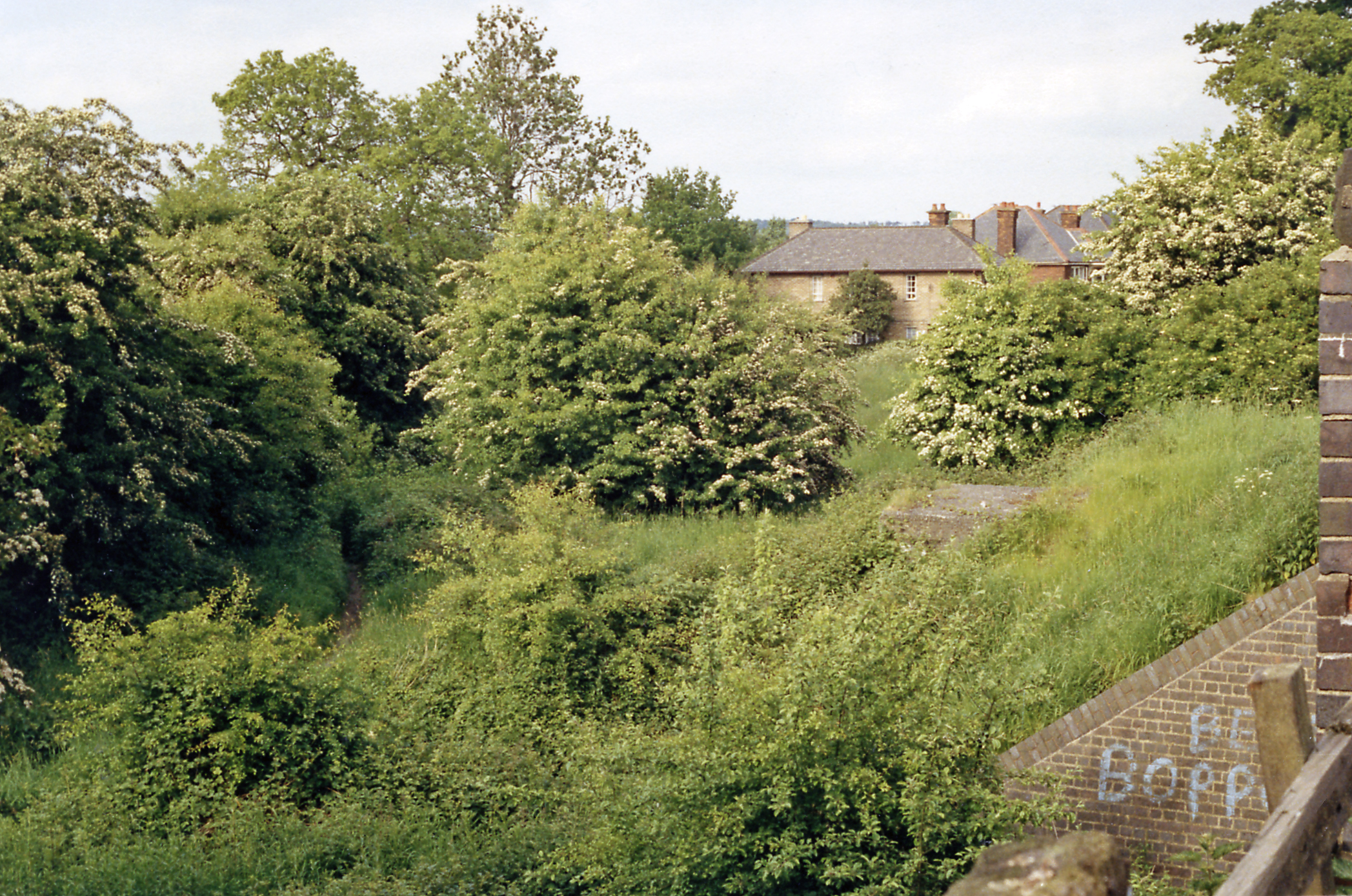
- The site of the station in 1988

General information
- Location: Coalville, North West Leicestershire; England
- Coordinates: 52.722433°N 1.358630°W

Other information
- Status: Disused

History
- Original company: Charnwood Forest Railway
- Pre-grouping: London and North Western Railway
- Post-grouping: London, Midland and Scottish Railway

Key dates
- 16 April 1883: Station opened
- 13 April 1931: Station closed
Location

Coalville East railway station was a station on the Charnwood Forest Railway. It served the town of Coalville, Leicestershire, England.

== History ==
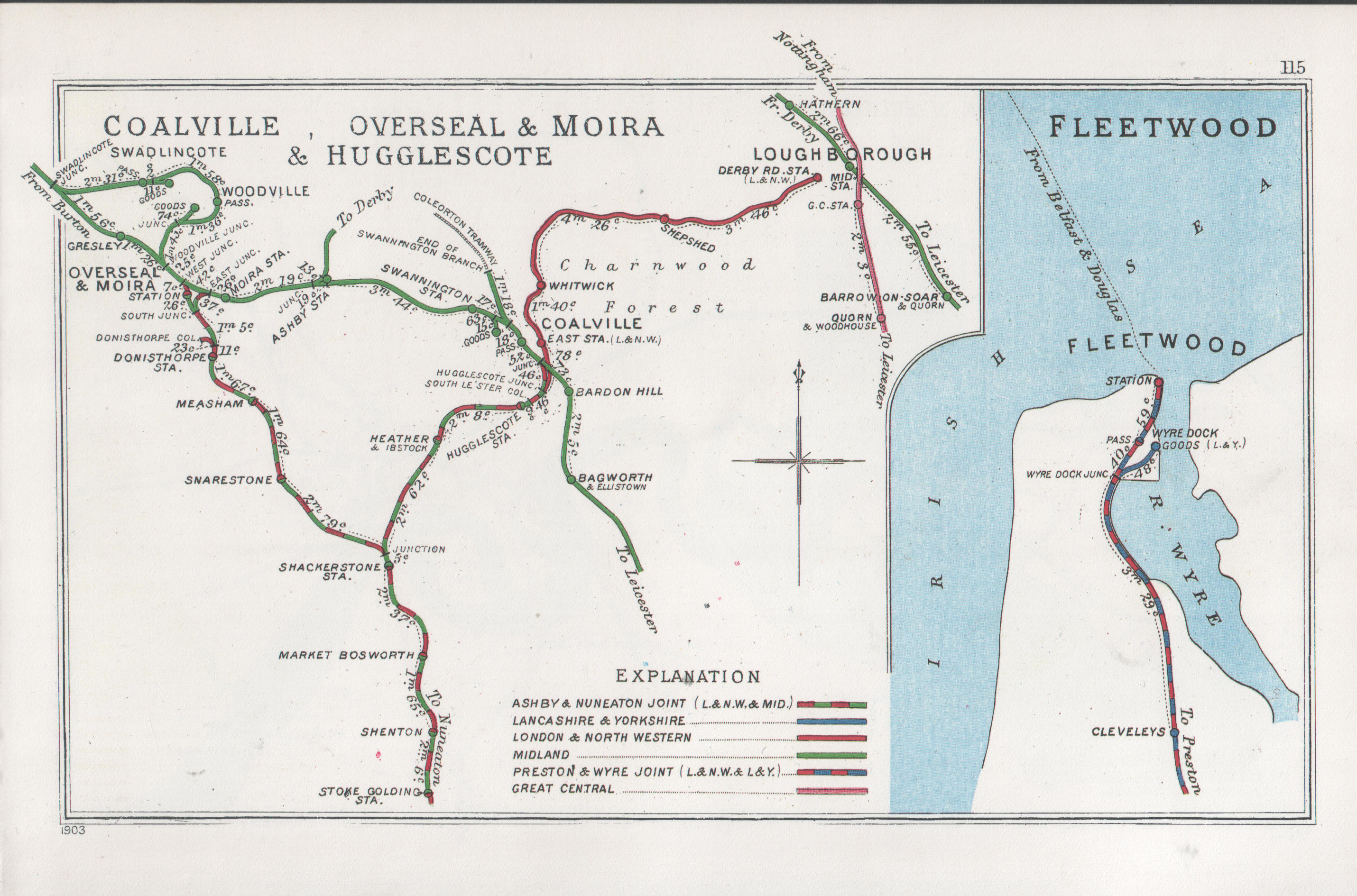
A 1903 Railway Clearing House Junction Diagram showing (left) railways in the vicinity of Coalville East (top right)

The station was opened by the Charnwood Forest Railway (CFR) on 16 April 1883. It was the start of their line to Loughborough. The CFR was operated by the London and North Western Railway (LNWR) from the outset, but remained independent until absorbed into the London, Midland and Scottish Railway (LMS), of which the LNWR was a constituent, at the 1923 Grouping.

The station was closed in 1931 when the passenger services on the line with withdrawn.

Today, the site of Coalville East station has been built over by housing, with sections of the line either built on or converted for use as public bridleways.

== Route ==
Preceding station	Disused railways	Following station
Whitwick; Line and station closed	London and North Western Railway; Charnwood Forest Railway	Hugglescote; Line and station closed
