= Nanpantan =

Suburb and ward of Loughborough in Leicestershire, England

Coordinates: 52.751219°N 1.251952°W

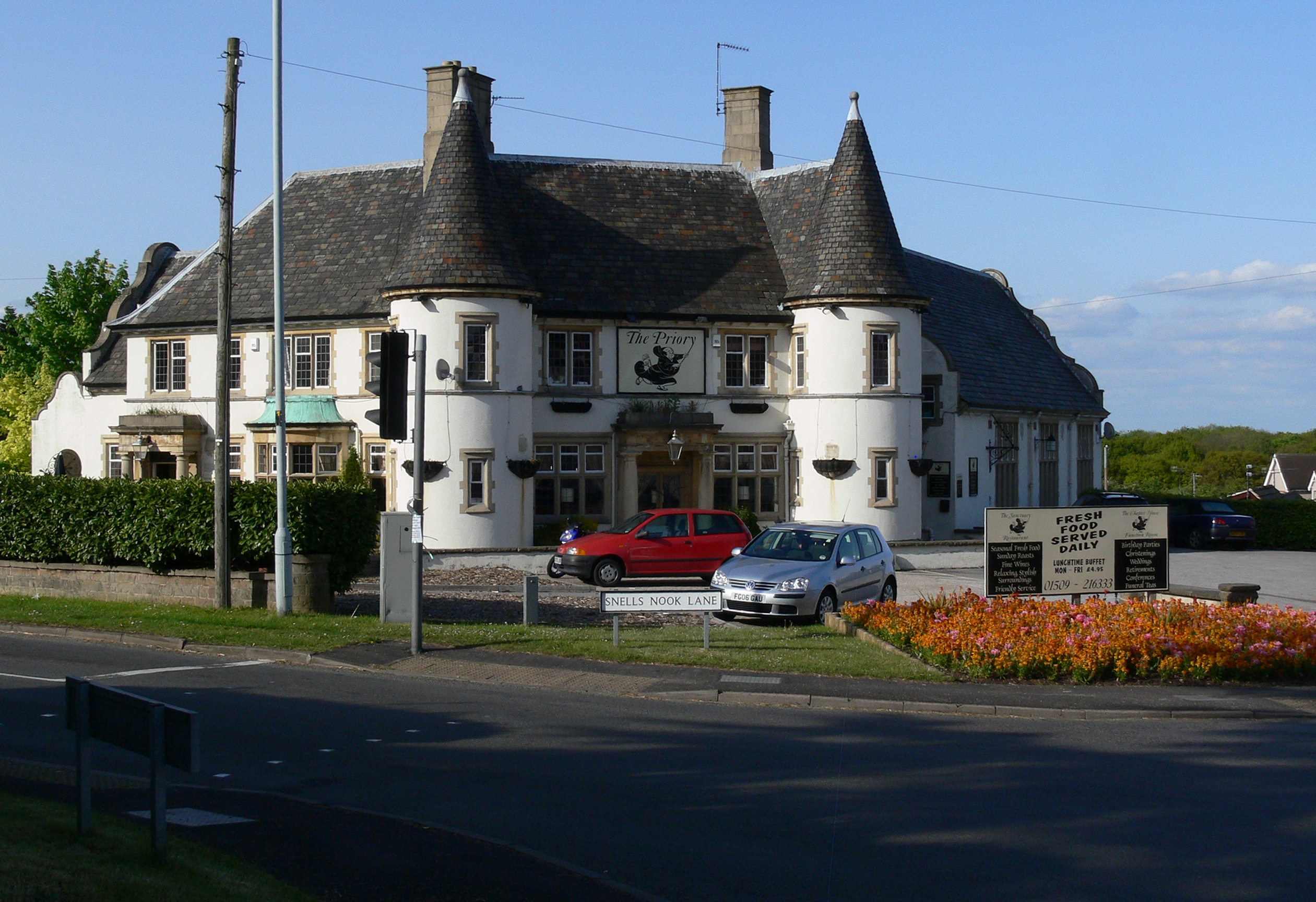
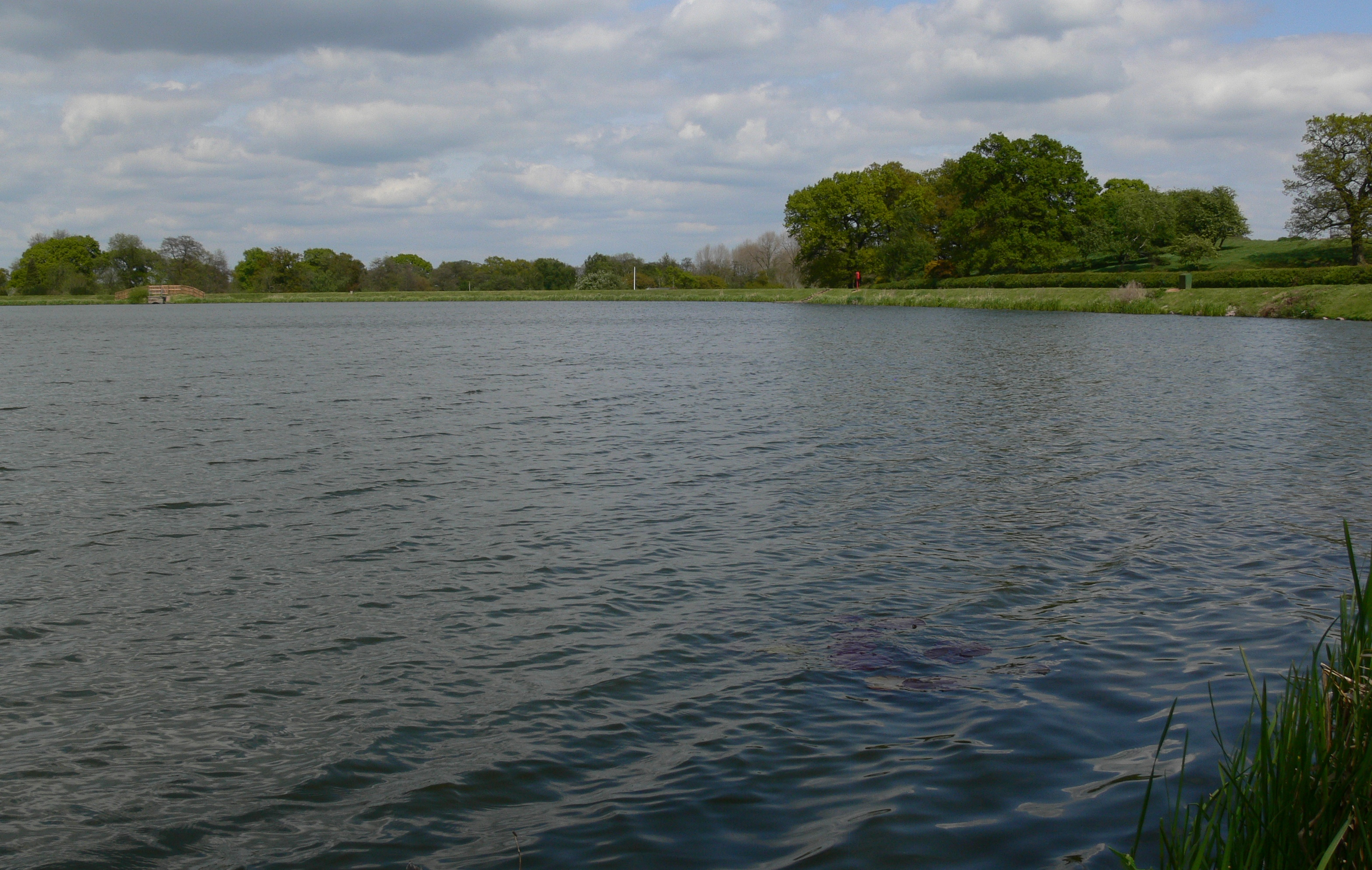
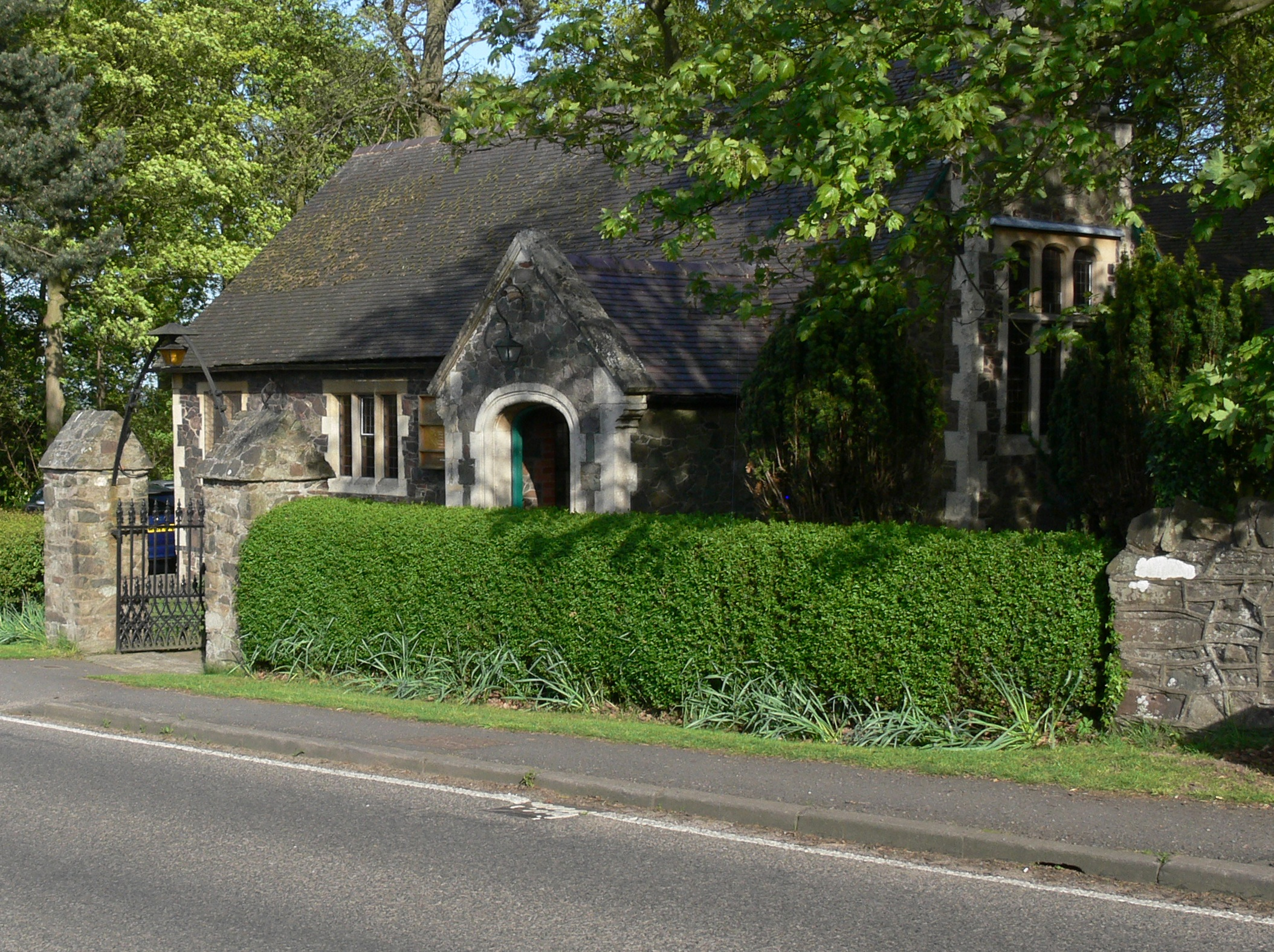
- Clockwise from top: The Priory, St. Mary-in-Charnwood Church & Nanpantan Reservoir

- Location within Leicestershire
- Population: 5,250 (2021 Census Ward Profile)
  - London: 113 mi (182 km) S
- Civil parish: Unparished
- District: Charnwood
- Shire county: Leicestershire
- Region: East Midlands
- Country: England
- Sovereign state: United Kingdom
- Post town: LOUGHBOROUGH
- Postcode district: LE11
- Dialling code: 01509
- Police: Leicestershire
- Fire: Leicestershire
- Ambulance: East Midlands
- UK Parliament: Loughborough

Nanpantan is a historic village, ward and suburb of Loughborough, in the Charnwood borough of Leicestershire, England. It is located in the south-west of the town of Loughborough. It is home to Nanpantan Reservoir.

== History ==
The first edge rails used in a wagonway were on the Charnwood Forest Canal, in the section between Nanpantan and Loughborough. Inside Nanpantan is a gastropub called The Priory. There is a small church here: Saint Mary in Charnwood, originally built as a mission room by the owner of Nanpantan Hall in 1888. After some years as a chapel of ease to the ecclesiastical parish of Emmanuel, Loughborough, Saint Mary in Charnwood became a parish in its own right, on 1 January 2015.

== Parish ==
Nanpantan became a civil parish in 1894, being formed from the rural part of Loughborough, on 1 April 1936 it was abolished and merged with Loughborough. In 1931 the parish had a population of 680. The parish of Loughborough was later abolished and the village became part of the unparished area of Loughborough.

== Geography ==
The ward covers the southwestern part of Loughborough and is mostly rural.

== Demographics ==
At the 2021 census, the ward profile population was 5,250. Of the findings, the ethnicity and religious composition of the ward was:

Loughborough Nanpantan: Ethnicity: 2021 Census
Ethnic group	Population	%
White	3,852	73.4%
Asian or Asian British	886	16.9%
Mixed	221	4.2%
Black or Black British	171	3.3%
Other Ethnic Group	94	1.8%
Arab	27	0.5%
Total	5,250	100%

The religious composition of the ward at the 2021 Census was recorded as:

Loughborough Nanpantan: Religion: 2021 Census
Religious	Population	%
Christian	2,041	43.5%
Irreligious	1,972	42%
Hindu	359	7.6%
Muslim	219	4.7%
Sikh	41	0.9%
Buddhist	38	0.8%
Other religion	20	0.4%
Jewish	5	0.1%
Total	5,250	100%
