= Swannington, Leicestershire =

Village in Leicestershire, England

Coordinates: 52.74093°N 1.38526°W

Swannington
- Village
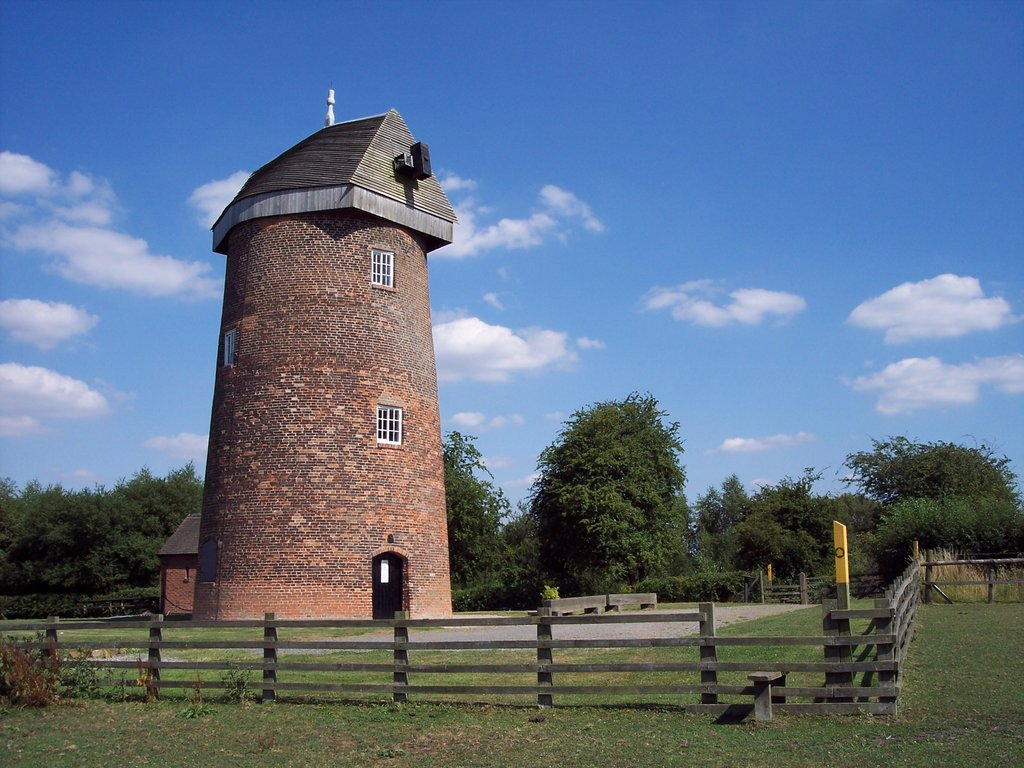
- Hough Mill, Swannington (2008)

- Location within Leicestershire
- Population: 1,270 (2011 Census)
- District: North West Leicestershire
- Shire county: Leicestershire
- Region: East Midlands
- Country: England
- Sovereign state: United Kingdom
- Post town: COALVILLE
- Postcode district: LE67
- Police: Leicestershire
- Fire: Leicestershire
- Ambulance: East Midlands
- UK Parliament: North West Leicestershire

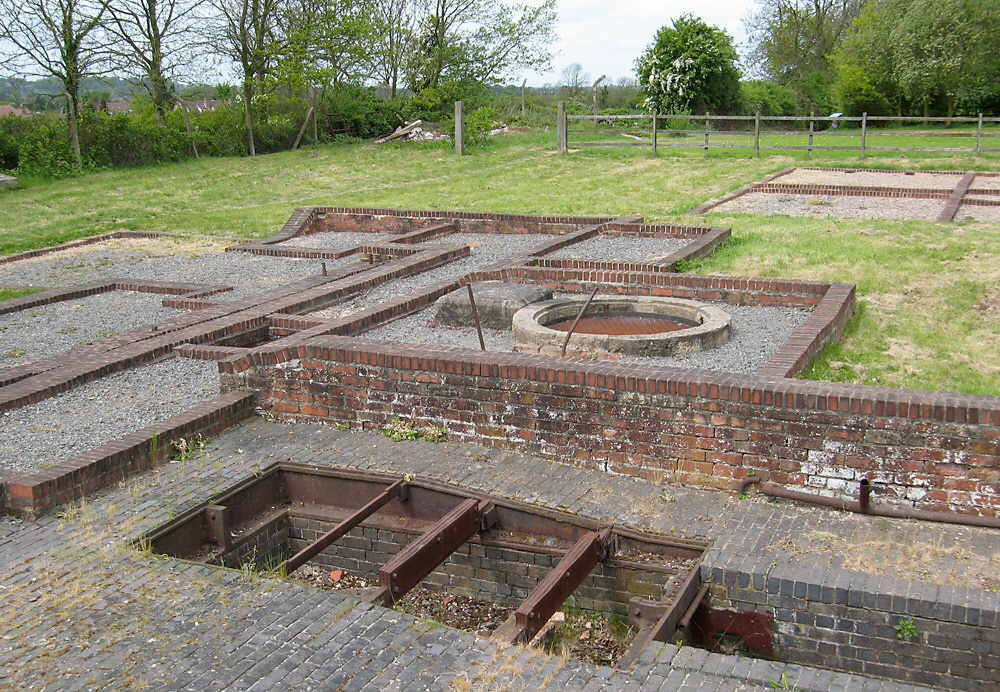
The remains of the engine house at the top of Swannington incline

Swannington is a former mining village in North West Leicestershire, England. A document of 1520 mentions five pits at Swannington. In the mid 18th century, the mines were owned and expanded by Gabriel Holland. It was a terminus of the early (1832) Leicester and Swannington Railway that was built to serve the townships of Swannington and Thringstone and is built on a spot reputedly chosen by William Wordsworth, a frequent guest of Sir George Beaumont (the 8th Baronet, 1799–1845) of nearby Coleorton Hall. It is possible that the dedication of the church to Saint George is derived from its association with this George Beaumont.

A windmill in Swannington called Hough Mill was built near a nature reserve established on the remains of Califat colliery (a 19th-century mine). It has been claimed as the birthplace of Robin Hood.

Administratively, Swannington is a civil parish forming part of the district of North West Leicestershire in Coalville. The population of the civil parish at the 2011 census was 1,270. Nearby villages and hamlets include Whitwick, Coleorton, Thringstone, Ravenstone, Gelsmoor, Peggs Green and Sinope.
