= Loughborough Derby Road railway station =

Former railway station in Leicestershire, England

Loughborough Derby Road

General information
- Location: Loughborough, Charnwood; England
- Coordinates: 52.7765°N 1.2170°W
- Grid reference: SK528201

Other information
- Status: Disused

History
- Original company: Charnwood Forest Railway
- Pre-grouping: London and North Western Railway
- Post-grouping: London, Midland and Scottish Railway

Key dates
- 16 April 1883: Station opened
- 13 April 1931: Station closed
Location

Loughborough Derby Road railway station was a station on the Charnwood Forest Railway.

== History ==
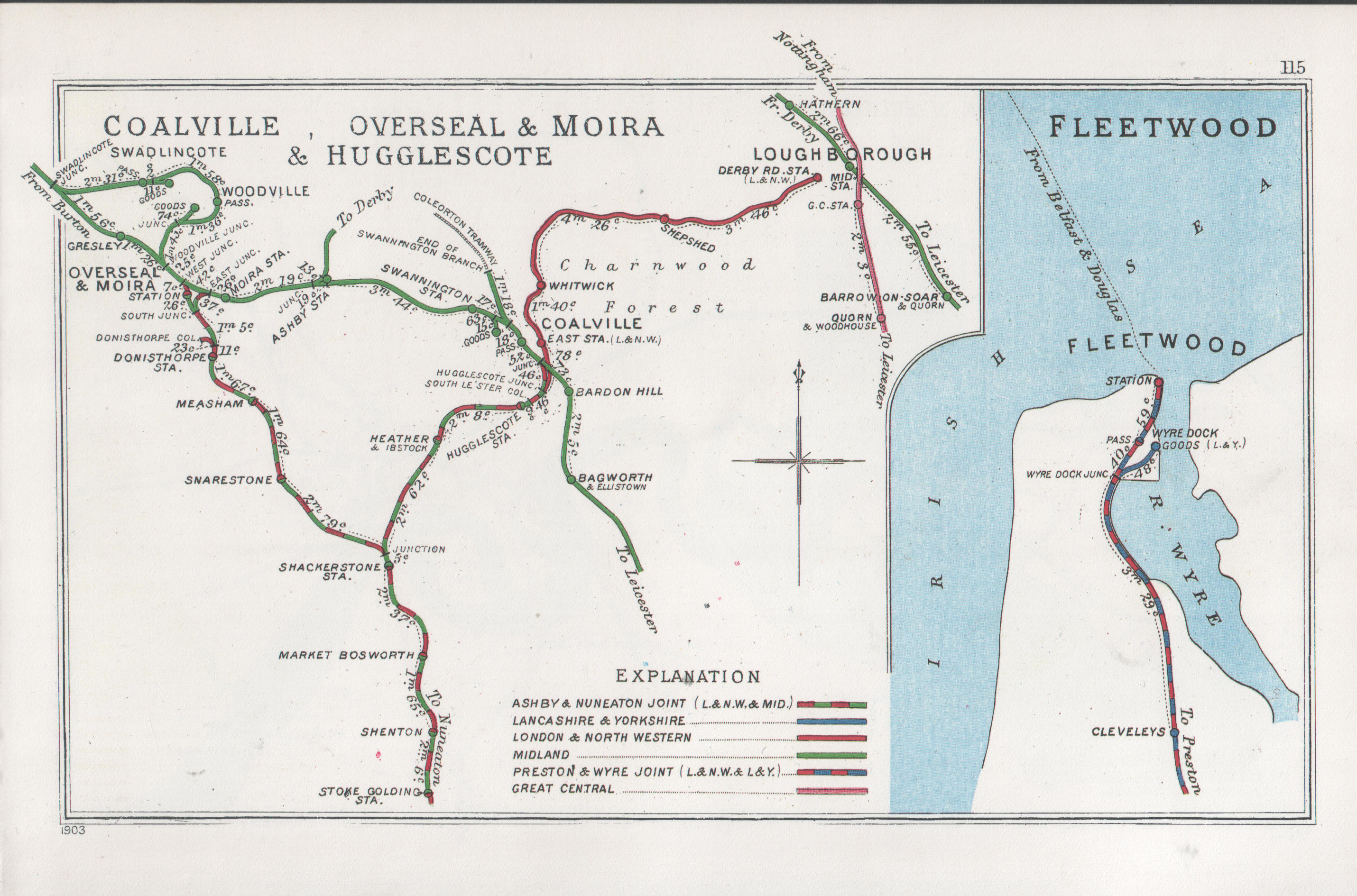
A 1903 Railway Clearing House Junction Diagram showing (left) railways in the vicinity of Loughborough Derby Road (top right)

The station was opened by the Charnwood Forest Railway (CFR) on 16 April 1883. It was the terminus of their line from Coalville. The CFR was operated by the London and North Western Railway (LNWR) from the outset, but remained independent until absorbed into the London, Midland and Scottish Railway (LMS), of which the LNWR was a constituent, as part of the 1923 Grouping.

The LMS had another station in Loughborough, and they closed the former CFR station on 13 April 1931.

The station was demolished after closure although the goods shed remained in situ and was used by light industry until the 2000s, after which it quickly became derelict. It was later demolished and now a Lidl superstore occupies the site of Derby Road station. Only old brick walls and fencing remains in situ.

Preceding station	Disused railways	Following station
Terminus	London and North Western Railway; Charnwood Forest Railway	Snells Nook Halt; Line and station closed
