= Charnwood Forest Railway =

Branch line in Leicestershire, England

Overview
- Other name: Bluebell Line
- Status: closed
- Locale: Leicestershire, England

History
- Commenced: 1881
- Completed: 1883
- Closed: 1963

The Charnwood Forest Railway was a branch line in Leicestershire constructed by the Charnwood Forest Company between 1881 and 1883. The branch line ran from Coalville (joined from the Ashby and Nuneaton Joint Railway (ANJR)) to the town of Loughborough.

It should not be confused with the much earlier railway that was part of the Charnwood Forest Canal.

Stations on the Charnwood Forest Railway were located at Coalville East, Whitwick, Shepshed and Loughborough Derby Road. By 1885, the company had been placed in receivership; under this supervision, in 1907 three halts were opened, these being Thringstone Halt, Grace Dieu Halt and Snells Nook Halt. These were an attempt to improve the profitability of the line by increasing the customer base. The line was worked by the London and North Western Railway (LNWR) and was taken over by the London Midland & Scottish Railway (LMS) in 1923.

Passenger services ceased to operate on 13 April 1931, with freight services ceasing to operate on 12 December 1963. The line was known as the 'Bluebell Line' due to the flower growing along much of the length of the line during the spring.

== History ==
=== Formation ===
According to Hadfield, in 1828 the owners of the disused Charnwood Forest Canal turned down an approach by Leicestershire coal owners for permission to lay rails along the now dry canal bed. The idea was to bring coal by this rail route from Whitwick and Swannington to Loughborough where it could then be transferred on to boats which would bring the coal into Leicester at West Bridge Wharf. Not to be deterred, the thwarted coal owners then promoted a bill in 1829 which resulted in the construction of the Leicester and Swannington Railway, opened in 1832 – Leicestershire's first railway.

Charnwood Forest Railway Act 1874
- Act of Parliament
- Parliament of the United Kingdom
- Long title: An Act for making a Railway from Coalville to Loughborough in the county of Leicester, to be called the "Charnwood Forest Railway;" and for other purposes.
- Citation: 37 & 38 Vict. c. cxxvii

Dates
- Royal assent: 16 July 1874

Text of statute as originally enacted

Charnwood Forest Railway Act 1878
- Act of Parliament
- Parliament of the United Kingdom
- Long title: An Act to authorise the Charnwood Forest Railway Company to divert portions of their authorised lines; and for other purposes.
- Citation: 41 & 42 Vict. c. xxiv

Dates
- Royal assent: 16 April 1878

Text of statute as originally enacted

Interest then came from London and North Western Railway as a way of getting a foothold in the coal mining area. It was authorised by the Charnwood Forest Railway Act 1874 (37 & 38 Vict. c. cxxvii) to lay a single-track railway from Nuneaton Junction near on the Ashby and Nuneaton Joint Railway to Loughborough. The intention was to link it to the Midland Main Line, but this never happened and the terminus was at Loughborough Derby Road.

A ceremony marking the beginning of work was held on a very rainy day, 31 August 1881. The first turf was cut by Lady Packe (wife of Hussey Packe) of Prestwold Hall. Squire de Lisle of Garendon Hall wheeled the first barrow load of soil over a plank, but due to the rain he slipped and spilled it all, causing great amusement.

The line was 10 1/4 miles (16.5 km) long with four stations serving Coalville (East), Whitwick, Shepshed and Loughborough (Derby Road). There was a rock face of 20 yards (18 m) through which to go at Thringstone and in order to swing the curve at Grace Dieu a cant of 6 inches (150 mm) was required. The line also had a steep gradient of 1 in 66 between Whitwick and Coalville East.

The line opened on 16 April 1883 and was worked by the LNWR which had subscribed a third of the capital in exchange for 50% of the gross receipts.

=== Decline ===
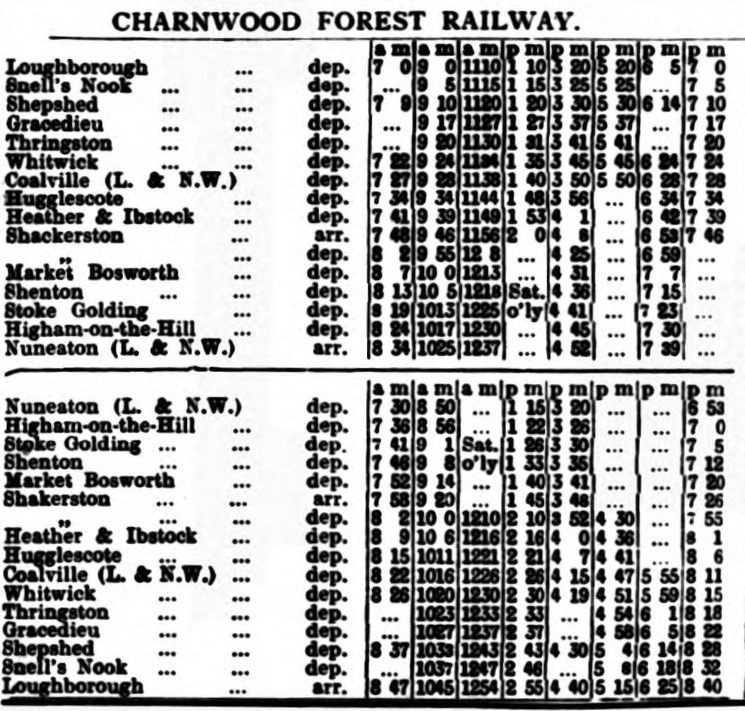
Timetable from July 1919 from the Loughborough Echo of 18 July 1919

As a result of being unable to pay the interest on debenture stocks and partly due to financial malfeasance by the Secretary, the line went into bankruptcy in 1885. In 1906 there was a move to join up with the Great Central Railway at Loughborough but nothing came of it and the terminus remained at Loughborough's Derby Road. The Company then came up with two initiatives designed to improve profitability; Cheap-to-run railmotor services, which were introduced between Loughborough and Shackerstone, and on 2 April 1907 three halts were opened for use with them.

On leaving the hands of the receiver in 1909 it remained a separate company until the LMS absorbed it in the 1923 grouping. Passengers trains were operated by an LNWR steam railmotor, though 2-4-2 tanks. 0-6-0 freight and 0-6-2 Coal Tanks also worked passenger services as well as freights. The LNWR ran nine passenger trains from Derby Road station in Loughborough with most going through to Shackerstone and two continuing to Nuneaton. In 1922 a passenger could leave Euston at 5:35, change at Nuneaton and Shackerstone and be in Whitwick at 8:32.

The line was never successful and went into a decline after World War I. The LMS withdrew passenger services on 13 April 1931.

=== Final days ===
During World War II the line enabled large amounts of road stone from quarries to be conveyed to new aerodromes throughout the country. Additionally, the line served a number of ammunition dumps, the army ambulance train was kept at Loughborough, rubber was stored at Shepshed and the USA Post Office was based at Coalville East.

After the war excursion trains ran on the line until 1951 and Loughborough goods yard closed on 31 October 1955. On 14 April 1957 "The Charnwood Forester" was the last train to run through to Loughborough. The last excursion on the line occurred in 1962 when the Manchester Railway Society ran a series of excursions. Pulled by loco '43728', the service ran from Charnwood Junction to Shepshed and back. The remaining goods services closed on 7 October 1963, except for Shepshed quarry traffic which lasted to 12 December 1963.

== Route ==
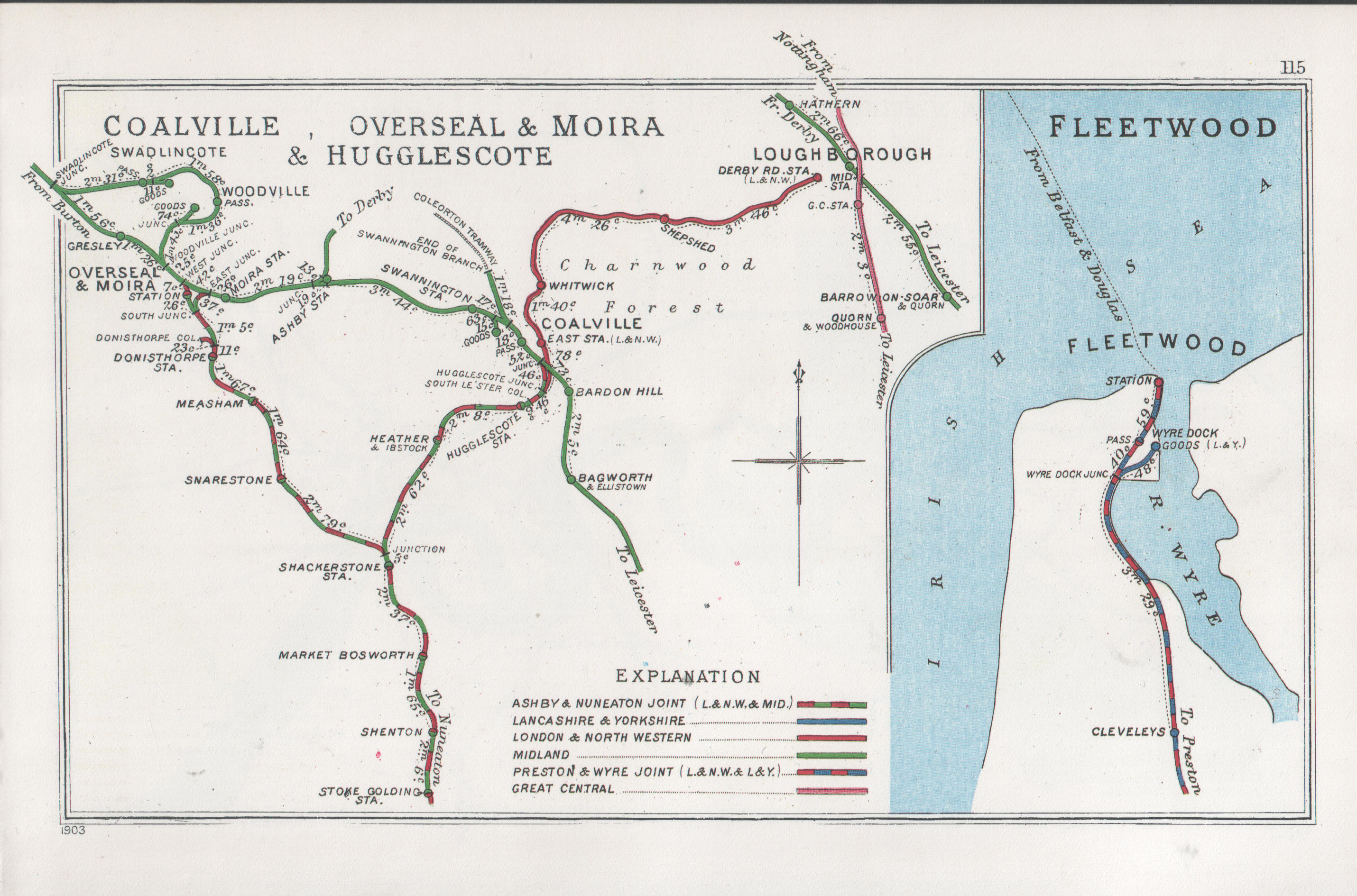
A 1903 Railway Clearing House Junction Diagram showing (left) the Charnwood Forest Railway (in red) and neighbouring lines

The branch was very picturesque, passing through the north-western corner of Charnwood Forest, which was a mass of bluebells in the spring resulting in the epithet "The Bluebell Line" in passengers days, although it was not the only line to be so termed. It was also known as the 'Bread and Herring Line' by the drivers and firemen.

The halts, opened in 1907, at Thringstone, Grace Dieu and Snells Nook were an attempt to attract passengers and enable effective competition with new omnibus services. All of the halts were merely platforms 6 feet (1.8 m) wide, 33 inches (84 cm) high and 60 feet (18 m) long, and made up of old sleepers. Waiting huts were added later. Originally, passengers boarding at the halts paid on the train but when the huts were provided the guard issued the tickets from the huts. It was also the guard's duty to tend the oil lamps at the platforms.

Route of the Charnwood Forest Line continuing from the Ashby and Nuneaton Joint Railway (ANJR):

- Charnwood Junction
- Coalville East Station (not to be confused with Coalville Town railway station)
- Whitwick Station
- Thringstone Halt. Thringstone halt was located only 3/4 mile (1.2 km) from the Station at Whitwick, in a cutting on the south side of the Gracedieu Road Bridge. The short platform was on the village side of the line and reached by steps down from the road. In 1914, some seven years after the halt had been opened, a hut was provided at the back of the platform following several requests by local residents. This was a standard LNWR 'portable' type, 16 by 18 feet (4.9 m × 5.5 m), of timber construction and with a plain pitched roof. Following its closure in 1931, the hut was rented by a Mr Ottey of Bauble Yard, Thringstone, for use as a Cobbler's shop.
- Grace Dieu Viaduct. A feature along the route is the Six Arch Viaduct in Gracedieu wood, spanning 40 yards (37 m) long with 3 by 15 inches (76 mm × 381 mm) coping stones from nearby Mountsorrel.
- Grace Dieu Halt
- Shepshed Station
- Snells Nook Halt
- Loughborough Derby Road

== Remains of the line ==
=== Structures ===
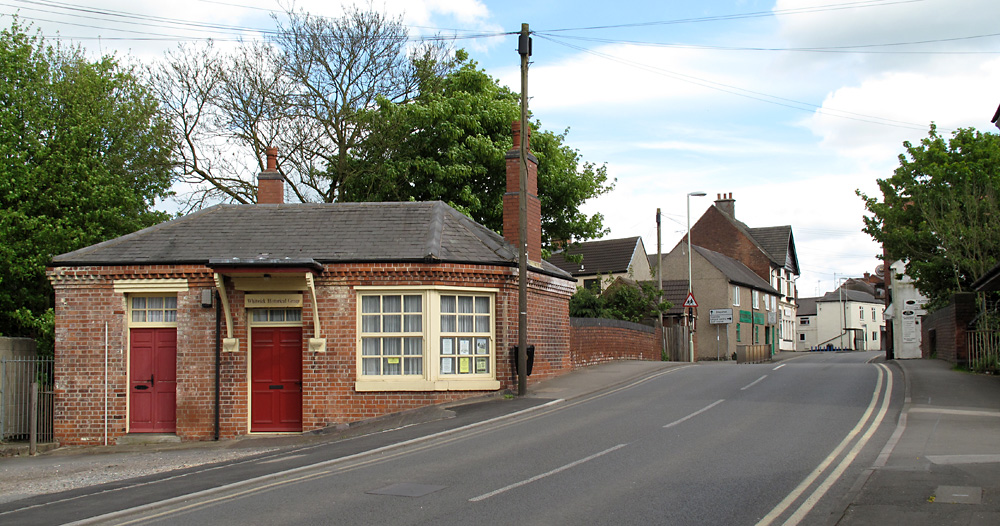
Whitwick station at road level

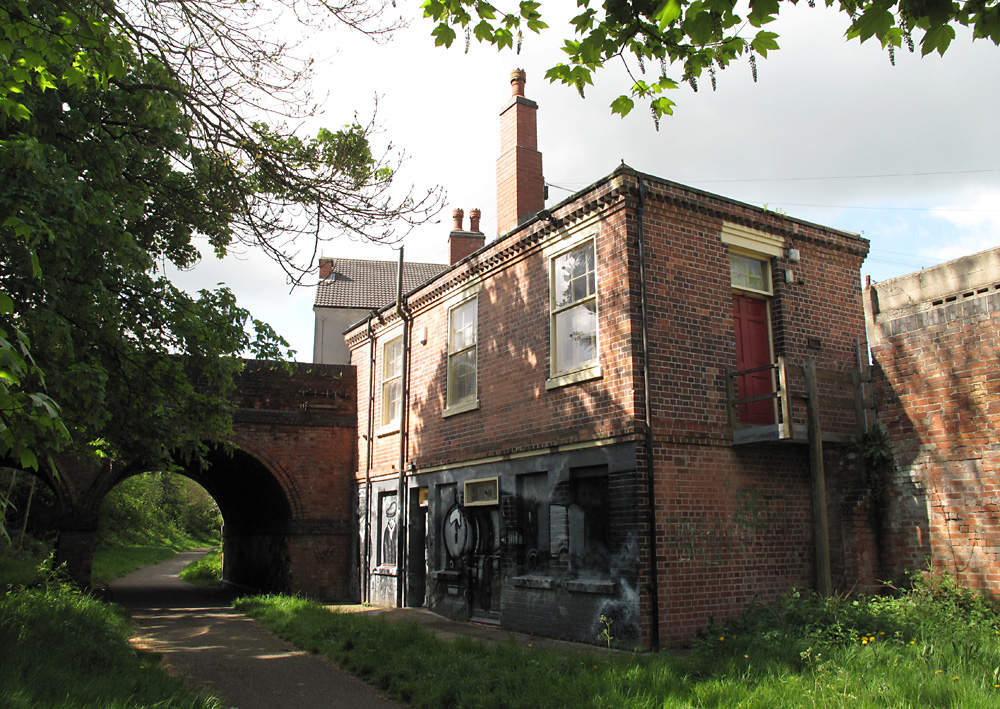
Whitwick station at trackbed level

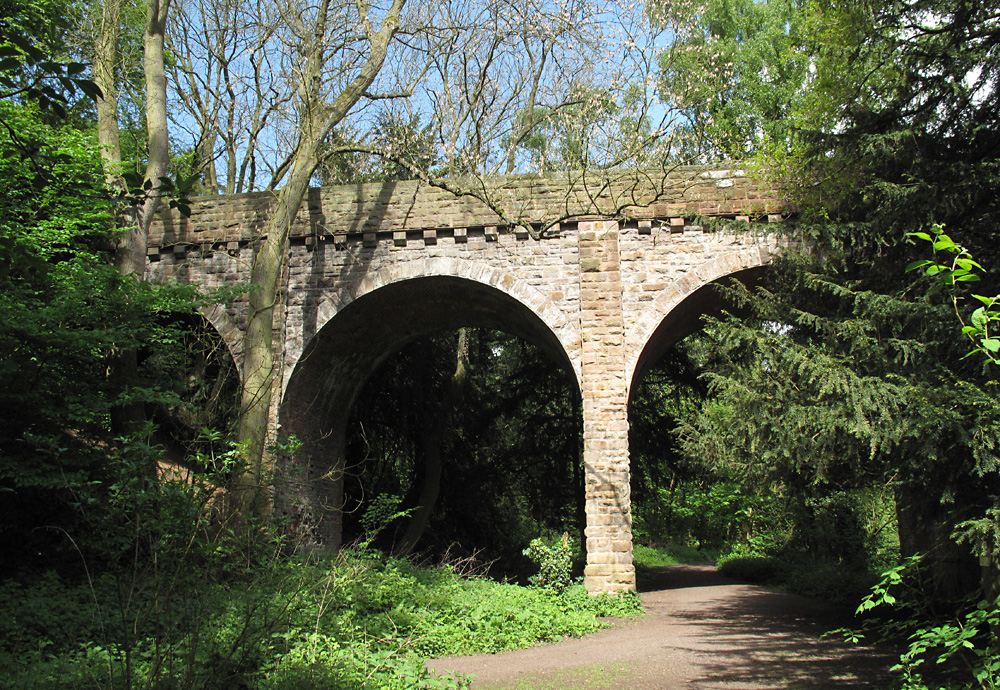
Grace Dieu viaduct

There are very few buildings still in existence which were once used by the railway. However, one still exists in Whitwick, and now serves as the home of the "Whitwick Historical Group". This is in the old station building near the market place.

The goods shed at Loughborough Derby Road stood until 2018, albeit in use with the rest of an industrial estate, when it was demolished to make way for a supermarket.

The only other buildings still standing (and this is a tenuous link) are the numerous bridges still carrying road traffic dotted amongst the local countryside. One of the best still remains intact within Thringstone woods, near Grace Dieu Priory ruins. This is the Grace Dieu Viaduct, a grand and imposing structure for such a small line.

The station buildings at Coalville East have been built upon (housing estate). The same has happened in Shepshed (industrial estate) and Loughborough. There is still a post near the site of Grace Dieu halt. The site of the halt itself was removed completely when the A512 was realigned and the CFR 3 arched bridge over the old road was demolished.

=== The trackbed ===
The trackbed remains remarkably intact, although some is now on private land. The most convenient place to start is near Coalville's Morrisons outlet (at grid reference SK428152) where the trackbed into Whitwick has been made a public right of way. This footpath meanders along the edge of the Hermitage Lake (a former clay quarry), past the modern leisure centre and then under the South Street bridge before passing the Whitwick station building and platform (although unfortunately the platform is unkempt and overgrown). This footpath along the trackbed ends at a T-junction just after Whitwick station, while the line went straight on over another bridge. The trackbed is less clear here, as it is now under someone's garden, who has carried out many alterations. At the other side of the garden however, the trackbed still retains its original ballast and is in remarkably good condition for a short distance, passing through an area known as 'Happy Valley', until the growth of vegetation starts again. It is still clear where it went, but less easy to follow due to vegetation. The line still has ballast here. For reference, we are now passing under Whitwick's "Dumps Road" bridge. The trackbed is still obvious here, yet it becomes less clear as we pass through Thringstone. Alterations to the surroundings make it hard to tell. The trackbed can be readily picked up near Grace Dieu Wood, which will take you across the aforementioned viaduct, and past Grace Dieu Priory to the edge of a missing bridge at the side of the A512. The bridge here was demolished in 1967. Across this gap, the trackbed continues on private land, where it is used for farm access, though it is still an obvious railway trackbed. West of Shepshed the trackbed has been converted to a footpath, popular with dog walkers and boys practicing their skills on mountain bicycles. The footpath starts at Charnwood Road in Shepshed (SK475187) and finishes in a dead-end about 2 km to the west (SK454187). In places along the way, derelict remains of the Charnwood Forest Canal can be identified

Through Shepshed the trackbed has been obliterated, but to the east it is distinguishable again and passes behind a lorry park before the M1 motorway cuts across the path of the line. After the motorway, the trackbed ran through the southern edge of Garendon Park, after which the line has again been converted to a footpath and cycleway near Old Ashby Road, with a dead-end at SK458186 and on towards Loughborough. The footpath along the trackbed leads all the way to Thorpe Hill where a community centre has been constructed over the trackbed. After the community centre the trackbed is followable again down to Loughborough Fire Station, which again has been built on the trackbed, from here the route of the line is difficult to follow, but the footpath follows the course of the line closely. A care home and industrial estate have been built upon the rest of the former trackbed to Loughborough Derby Road station.

The Station Hotel, now converted to a funeral home, is the only remaining structure of the small terminus constructed at this location.

== See also ==
- Loughborough Derby Road
- Whitwick railway station
- London and North Western Railway
- Ashby and Nuneaton Joint Railway
- Charnwood Forest Canal
