= Sutton Cheney =

Village in Leicestershire, England

Coordinates: 52.599423°N 1.386251°W

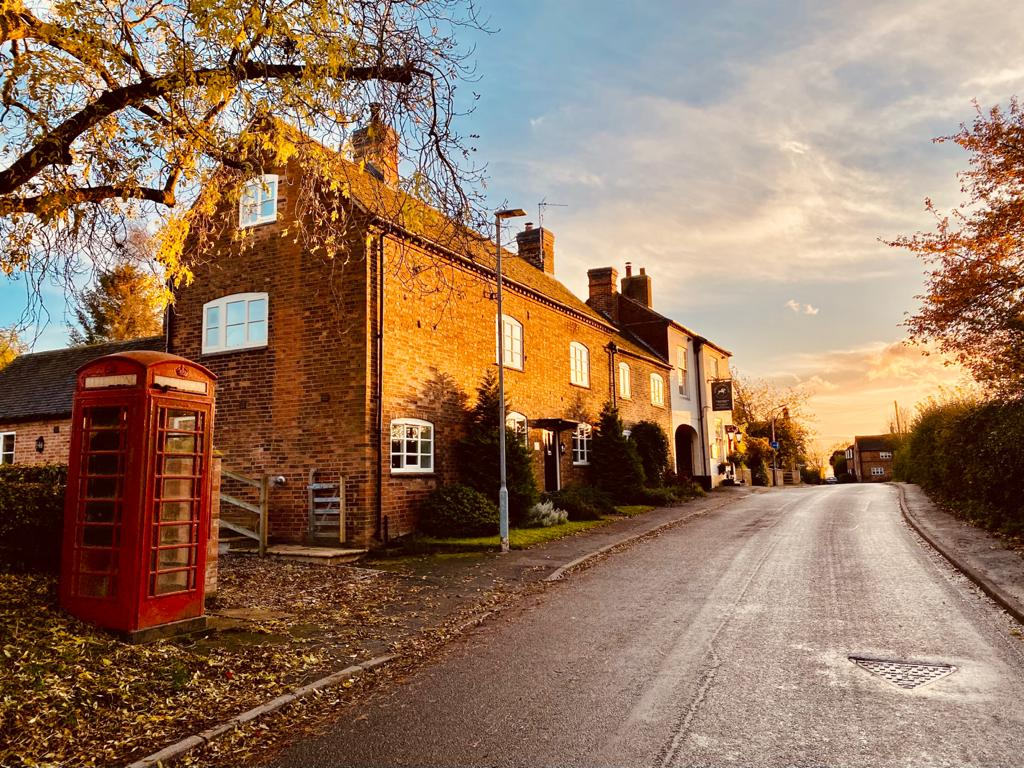
- Main Street, Sutton Cheney

- Location within Leicestershire
- Population: 538 (2011)
- OS grid reference: SK418006
- Civil parish: Dadlington and Sutton Cheney
- District: Hinckley and Bosworth
- Shire county: Leicestershire
- Region: East Midlands
- Country: England
- Sovereign state: United Kingdom
- Post town: NUNEATON
- Postcode district: CV13
- Dialling code: 01455
- Police: Leicestershire
- Fire: Leicestershire
- Ambulance: East Midlands
- UK Parliament: Hinckley and Bosworth

Sutton Cheney (/ˈsʌtən ˈtʃiːni/ SUT-ən CHEE-nee) is a village and former civil parish, now in the parish of Dadlington and Sutton Cheney, in the borough of Hinckley and Bosworth, in the county of Leicestershire, England, near the county border with Warwickshire. In addition to the village of Sutton Cheney itself, the civil parish also contains the villages of Dadlington and Shenton, a number of farms, and the location of the Battle of Bosworth. Its closest large towns are Nuneaton and Hinckley. Its closest market town is Market Bosworth.

The village of Sutton Cheney is clustered around the intersection of four roads: Ambion Lane leading westwards to the village of Shenton; Bosworth Road leading northwest to the neighbouring town of Market Bosworth; Main Street leading northeast to the villages of Cadeby or Stapleton; and Wharf Lane leading southwest to Sutton Cheney Wharf on the Ashby-de-la-Zouch Canal.

The civil parish of Dadlington and Sutton Cheney is bordered by the civil parishes of Market Bosworth to the north; Cadeby to the northeast; Peckleton to the east; Barwell, Stoke Golding, and Higham on the Hill to the south; and Sheepy to the west. Its population at the 2021 census was 490, down from 538 in 2011 and from 545 in 2001.

== History ==
The area was settled in both Bronze Age and Roman times but the earliest written mention of the village of Sutton Cheney is in the Domesday Book of 1086 when it was named Sutone. It was mostly owned by Crowland Abbey with a minor holding in the hands of Hugh de Grandmesnil, a companion of William the Conqueror. At that time it was recorded as having four households.

The manor took the name 'Sutton Chainell' during the thirteenth century on account of a rich farmer named Chainell who held the village as a tenant of Crowland Abbey but the name appears variously as Sutton, Sutton juxta Bosworth, Sutton Chenyie, Sutton Cheny, and Sutton Cheynell in deeds and other official registers between the fourteenth and eighteenth centuries.

The army of Richard III made camp in the village on 21 August 1485, the night before the Battle of Bosworth Field, and the battle itself took place within the civil parish, near to Dadlington. Richard died in the battle, which was the last battle of the Wars of the Roses. It ended the Middle Ages in England and ushered in the Tudor period.

In 1564 there were 25 families living in Sutton Cheynell and in 1630 the freeholders were Sir William Roberts, Richard May, William Drakeley and John Swinfen. Sir William Roberts endowed six Almshouses for the village in 1612 and his tomb is still extant in the village church, with the inscriptions: 'Sir William Roberts was son of Thomas Roberts and married to his first wife Katherine, daughter of Richard Elkington, and to his second wife Elizabeth, daughter of Valentine Hartopp; but by neither had issue. He lived 79 years and died Feb 24 1633' and 'Here lyeth interred the body of Sir William Roberts, who in his life-time, being devoted both to hospitality and charity, among other memorable works erected, out of a pious mind, a hospital for six poor men adjoining the churchyard and endowed it with 30 pounds worth of land yearly for their maintenance for ever.'

Between the seventeenth and twentieth centuries, the village of Sutton Cheney was an estate village, developed to suit the needs of a single farming family, with the Hall as their home. In addition to workers' cottages, a further range of buildings such as a blacksmith's, bakery, and post office provided the essentials of rural life, together with Almshouses for poor single men. These have now all been converted to dwellings but the village retains its traditional character and is designated as a conservation area. Today, the majority of the land and approximately half the dwellings are still in the ownership of the estate, with half the dwellings in private ownership.

Sutton Cheney was formerly a chapelry in the parish of Market-Bosworth, from 1866 Sutton Cheney was a civil parish in its own right, on 1 April 1935 the parishes of Dadlington and Shenton were merged with Sutton Cheney, the merged parish was named "Sutton Cheney" until 2023 when it was renamed "Dadlington and Sutton Cheney". In 1931 the parish of Sutton Cheney (prior to the merge) had a population of 207.

== Battlefield Heritage Centre ==
Within the village and the civil parish, on Ambion Hill, is the Bosworth Battlefield Heritage Centre and Country Park, maintained by Leicestershire County Council as a country park and learning centre to advance public knowledge about the Battle of Bosworth Field.

The centre also contains the Tithe Barn restaurant and cafe, based in a reconstructed fourteenth century oak timbered barn, donated by the Derbyshire County Council.

Other monuments within the centre include King Richard's Well, where Richard III is reputed to have drunk before the battle and a cairn now stands as his monument, and a memorial sundial.

== Other attractions and amenities ==
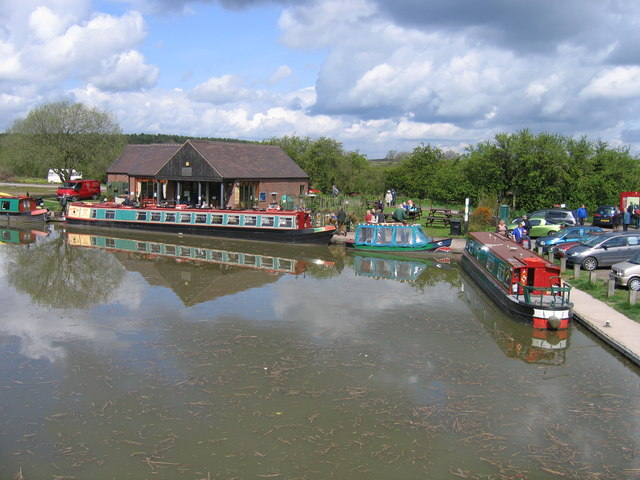
Sutton Cheney Wharf

Sutton Cheney Wharf is situated within the civil parish on the Ashby-de-la-Zouch Canal and maintained by the Canal & River Trust. It gives access through Ambion Wood to the Battlefield Centre and there is also a cafe called Sutton Wharf on the site.

A heritage steam railway, the Battlefield Line Railway, runs from Shenton station, within the civil parish, to Shackerstone. It is operated by the Shackerstone Railway Society.

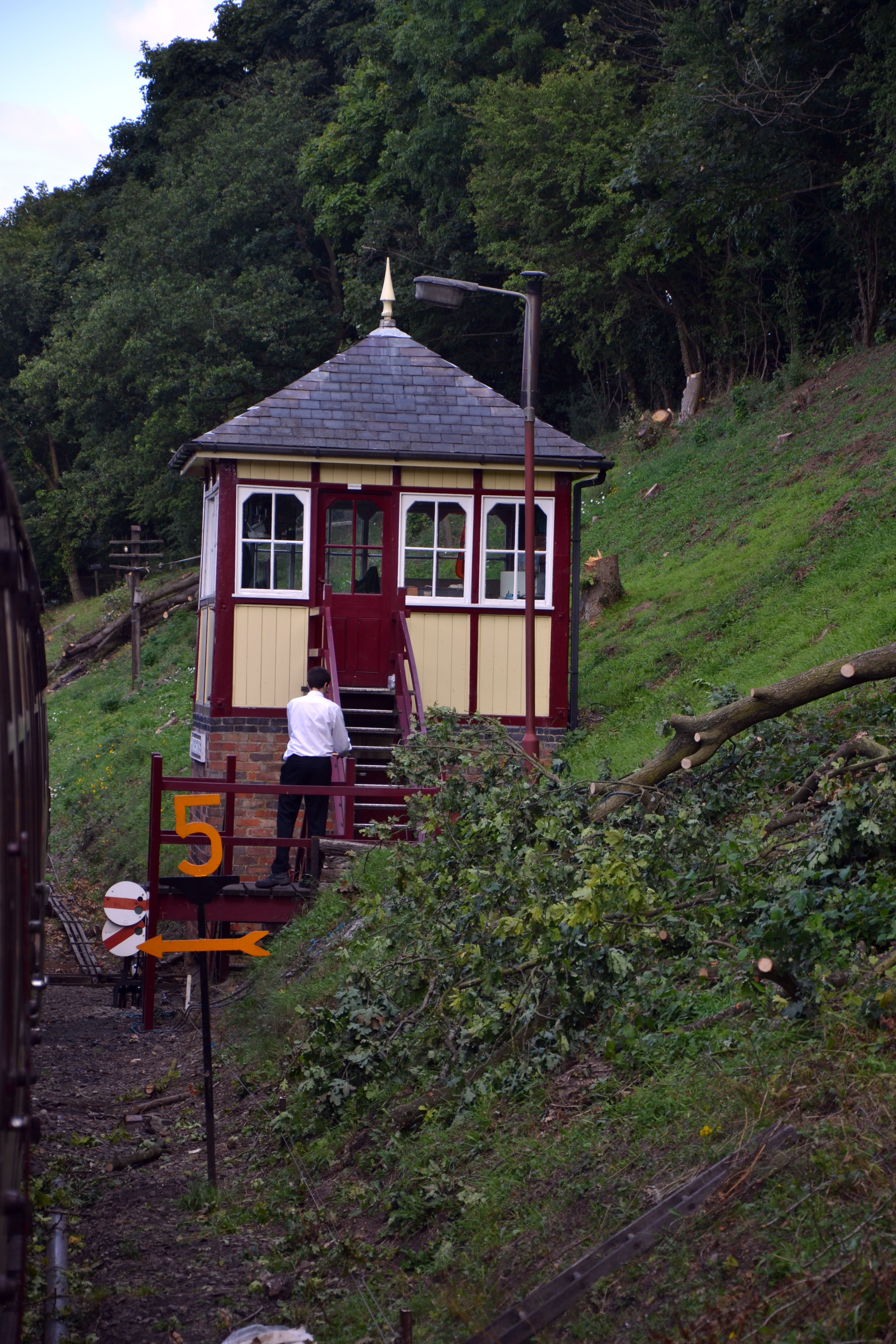
A signal box on the preserved Battlefield Line

In the village of Shenton the old village hall is now an art gallery and cafe, the White Dove Gallery, and a group of restored and listed farm buildings now operate as Whitemoors Antique Centre and Tearooms.

The Leicestershire Round, a 200 mile walk around the county of Leicestershire runs through the civil parish and the village itself, linking it by footpath to the adjacent town and civil parish of Market Bosworth in a walk through farmland and Market Bosworth Country Park.

== Notable buildings in the village ==
The village of Sutton Cheney has two Georgian coaching inns. The Hercules Revived (formerly The Hercules Inn), is named after the prizewinning horse Hercules owned by the Dixie family of Market Bosworth in the eighteenth century. It was renovated and restored in 2012. The Royal Arms (formerly The Greyhound Inn) was re-opened in 2003 as a hotel, restaurant, and wedding venue.

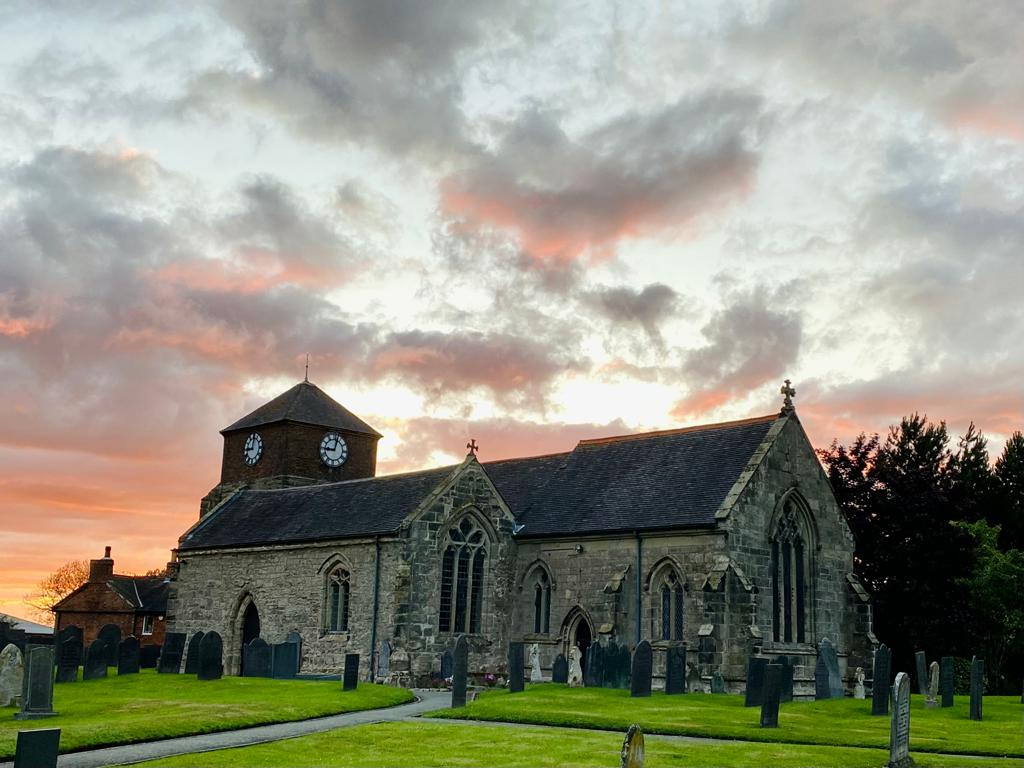
Church of St James, Sutton Cheney

St James' Church dates originally from the early 13th century with repairs and restorations in the centuries since, including the west tower built in brick in the nineteenth century. Richard III reputedly heard his last Mass in the church the night before the Battle of Bosworth Field. The church is consequently known as "the Battlefield Church" and contains a plaque in remembrance of him. Many of the kneelers in the church were embroidered by members of the Richard III Society and on 22 March 2015, the funeral cortège of the King paused in Sutton Cheney en route to his burial in Leicester Cathedral.

The six Almshouses founded by Sir William Roberts in 1612 and altered in 1811, as a plaque records, due to "the liberality of Rosamund Kinnersley" are now a private home, having been converted in the late twentieth century.

The Hall dates from 1601 with later additions and a Victorian wing.

Townshend Farmhouse dates from the early 19th century with an earlier core.

The village has been designated as a conservation area.

== Notable residents and visitors ==
As well as Richard III, the parish also contained the campsite of Henry VII, the victor of the Battle of Bosworth, who was crowned King of England in the adjacent civil parish of Stoke Golding.

The famous mathematician Thomas Simpson FRS (1710-1761) of Market Bosworth, Nuneaton, and Woolwich is buried in the graveyard of St James' Church. There is a Latin memorial plaque to him inside the Church to the left of the door.

The village's vicar from 1960 until his death in 1986, the Rev. E. R. "Teddy" Boston, was notable as a traction engine and light railway enthusiast and engineer who constructed the now-dismantled Cadeby Light Railway. He was immortalised in his friend Rev. Wilbert Awdry's The Railway Series books (more commonly known as the Thomas the Tank Engine books) as "the Fat Clergyman". There is a plaque to him in the chancel of St James' Church.
