= Dadlington =

Village in Leicestershire, England

Coordinates: 52.57832°N 1.40525°W

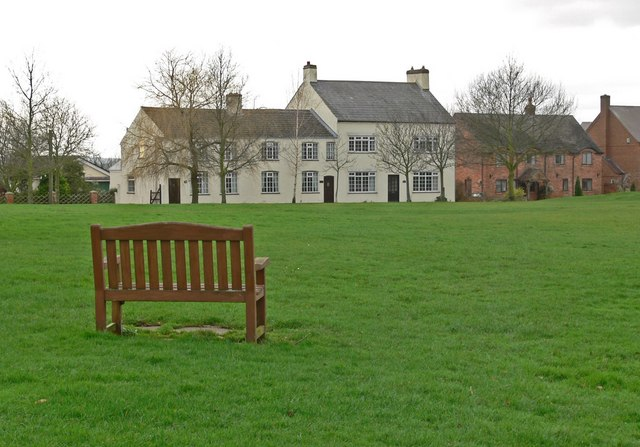
- Dadlington Village green

- Location within Leicestershire
- OS grid reference: SP404980
- Civil parish: Dadlington and Sutton Cheney
- District: Hinckley and Bosworth
- Shire county: Leicestershire
- Region: East Midlands
- Country: England
- Sovereign state: United Kingdom
- Post town: NUNEATON
- Postcode district: CV13
- Police: Leicestershire
- Fire: Leicestershire
- Ambulance: East Midlands
- UK Parliament: Hinckley and Bosworth

Dadlington is a village and former civil parish, now in the parish of Dadlington and Sutton Cheney, in the Hinckley and Bosworth district, in Leicestershire, England. It is situated between Hinckley, Market Bosworth and Nuneaton. In 1931 the parish had a population of 200.

The village has a population of around 301 and contains a 13th-century church (St. James), a pub (the Dog and Hedgehog) and a hotel (the Ambion Court).

The Ashby-de-la-Zouch Canal runs through the village.

== History ==
The village's name means 'farm/settlement of Daedela'.

Dadlington became a parish in 1866, on 1 April 1935 the parish was abolished and merged with Sutton Cheney.

A silver gilt white boar, Richard III's personal emblem, and distributed widely among his followers, was discovered at Fen Hole outside Dadlington in 2010. There is a theory that the Battle of Bosworth took place at Dadlington, not at Ambion Hill. On Sunday 22 March 2015, the funeral cortège of King Richard III paused in Dadlington en route to his burial in Leicester Cathedral.

In 1511 the wardens of St. James' chapel at Dadlington petitioned King Henry VIII for a chantry foundation in memory of those who fell at the Battle of Bosworth, 1485 (the churchyard being the main place of interment for the dead). A 'Letter of Confraternity' was published and the chantry was established in a minimal form but dissolved in 1547 under Edward VI with the general abolition of such foundations. In 1985, the quincentenary year of the battle, Dadlington (through the publications of Dr Colin Richmond and, subsequently, Dr Peter Foss) became the centre of a controversy over the battle's location, which has now resulted in a major reassessment of the battle site and scenario currently being undertaken by Leicestershire County Council.

During the English Civil War Dadlington was visited by troops from the parliamentary garrisons at Tamworth and Coventry seeking horses and free quartering. A claim to the Warwickshire county committee submitted by the constables in June, 1646 reveals that on 12 March 1643 a certain Burdett, described as "a soldier under Captain Turton of Tamworth" made off with a horse belonging to Ann Turton, a widow. (A Richard Turton is listed in a 1643 Tamworth garrison musters of "officers, dragoons and soldjers"). A few months later "Mason, a soldier under Captain Turton" (probably John Mason, also listed among the Tamworth garrison) took a horse worth £2.6.8 from this same Ann Turton, who may well have been related to the captain. Colonel Purefoy's soldiers from Coventry availed themselves of free quarter "for one night and part of a day" estimated to be worth £2.10, while Captain Flower's footsoldiers from Coventry took a horse worth 2s from Michael Cox and Captain Ottaway's soldiers a horse worth 5s from Thomas Everard. (Exchequer accounts, SP 28/161)
