= Hinckley and Bosworth =

Coordinates: 52°36′45″N 1°21′13″W

Borough of Hinckley and Bosworth
- Borough and non-metropolitan district
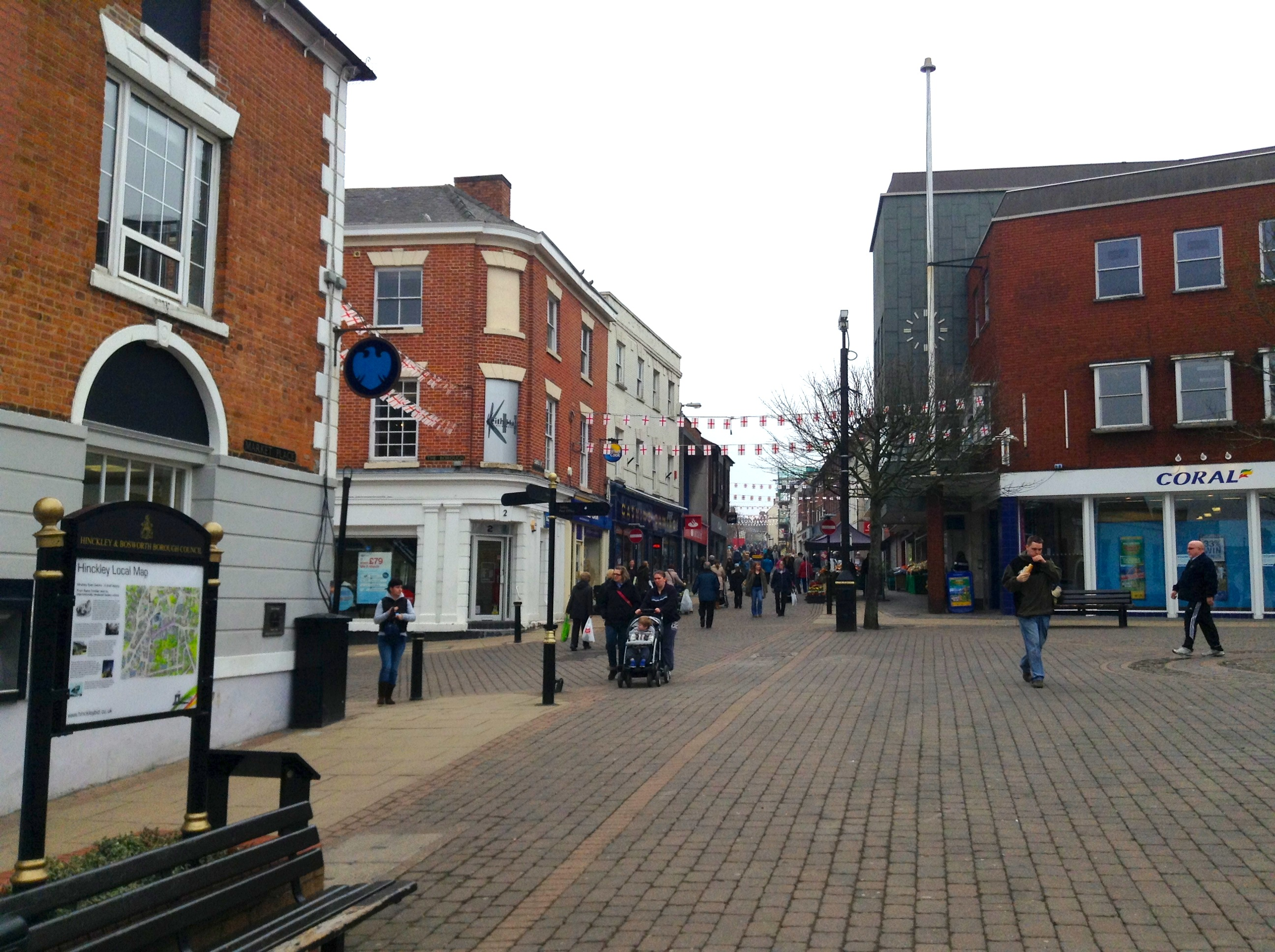
- Hinckley, the administrative centre and largest town in the borough

- Shown within Leicestershire
- Sovereign state: United Kingdom
- Constituent country: England
- Region: East Midlands
- Administrative county: Leicestershire
- Admin. HQ: Hinckley

Government
  - Type: Hinckley and Bosworth Borough Council
  - MPs: Luke Evans & Edward Argar (Groby only)

Area
  - Total: 115 sq mi (297 km^{2})
  - Rank: 119th

Population (2025)
  - Total: 118,240
  - Rank: Ranked 212th
  - Density: 1,030/sq mi (398/km^{2})

Ethnicity (2021)
  - Ethnic groups: List: 94.3% White; 2.8% Asian; 1.8% Mixed; 0.6% Black; 0.5% other

Religion (2021)
  - Religion: List: 52.6% Christianity; 44% no religion; 2.7% other; 0.7% Islam
- Time zone: UTC+0 (Greenwich Mean Time)
  - Summer (DST): UTC+1 (British Summer Time)
- ONS code: 31UE (ONS); E07000132 (GSS)

Hinckley and Bosworth is a local government district with borough status in Leicestershire, England. It contains the towns of Earl Shilton, Hinckley and Market Bosworth. As well as notable villages including Barwell, Burbage, Desford, Fenny Drayton, Groby, Markfield, Ratby and Twycross.

The neighbouring districts are North West Leicestershire, Charnwood, Blaby, Rugby, Nuneaton and Bedworth and North Warwickshire.

== History ==
The district was created on 1 April 1974 under the Local Government Act 1972, covering the area of two former districts, which were both abolished at the same time:

- Hinckley Urban District (which included the town of Earl Shilton and villages of Barwell, Burbage, and Stoke Golding)
- Market Bosworth Rural District (except parish of Ibstock, which went to North West Leicestershire)

The government initially named the new district "Bosworth", corresponding to the Parliamentary Constituency covering the area. The shadow council elected to oversee the transition to the new system requested a change to "Hinckley and Bosworth", which was agreed by the government on 20 November 1973, before the new district formally came into being. The new district was awarded borough status from its creation, allowing the chair of the council to take the title of mayor.

== Abolition ==
Under current local government reform plans, the district will be abolished in 2028 with its area becoming part of a Leicestershire and Rutland unitary authority.

== Governance ==
Hinckley and Bosworth Borough Council

Type
- Type: Non-metropolitan district

History
- Founded: 1 April 1974

Leadership
- Mayor: Cathie Gibbens, Liberal Democrat since 12 May 2026
- Leader: Stuart Bray, Liberal Democrat since 21 May 2019
- Chief Executive: Bill Cullen since 1 January 2017

Structure
- Seats: 34 councillors
- Political groups: Administration (23) Liberal Democrat (23) Other parties (11) Conservative (9) Labour (1) Independent (1)
- Length of term: 4 years

Elections
- Last election: 4 May 2023

Meeting place
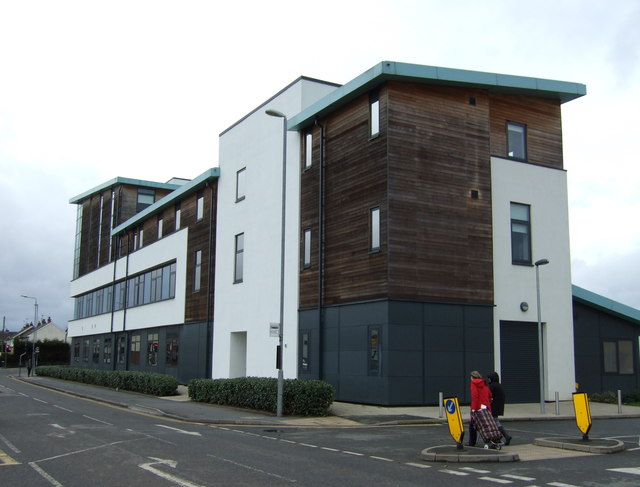
- Hinckley Hub, Rugby Road, Hinckley, LE10 0FR

Website
- www.hinckley-bosworth.gov.uk

Hinckley and Bosworth Borough Council provides district-level services. County-level services are provided by Leicestershire County Council. Much of the borough is also covered by civil parishes, which form a third tier of local government.

=== Political control ===
The council has been under Liberal Democrat majority control since 2019.

The first election to the council was held in 1973, initially operating as a shadow authority alongside the outgoing authorities until coming into its powers on 1 April 1974. Since 1974 political control of the council has been as follows:

Party in control	Years
No overall control	1974–1976
Conservative	1976–1995
No overall control	1995–2003
Conservative	2003–2007
Liberal Democrats	2007–2015
Conservative	2015–2019
Liberal Democrats	2019–present

=== Leadership ===
The role of mayor is largely ceremonial in Hinckley and Bosworth. Political leadership is instead provided by the leader of the council. The leaders since 2003 have been:

Councillor	Party	From	To
Carole Claridge	Conservative	2003	Feb 2006
Mike Bevins	Conservative	27 Feb 2006	May 2007
David Bill	Liberal Democrats	15 May 2007	Dec 2009
Stuart Bray	Liberal Democrats	15 Dec 2009	May 2015
Mike Hall	Conservative	19 May 2015	May 2019
Stuart Bray	Liberal Democrats	21 May 2019	

=== Composition ===
Following the 2023 election, and subsequent changes of allegiance in May 2024, the composition of the council was:

Party	Councillors
Liberal Democrats	23
Conservative	9
Labour	1
Independent	1
Total	34

=== Elections ===
Since the last boundary changes in 2003 the council has comprised 34 councillors, representing 16 wards, with each ward electing one, two or three councillors. Elections are held every four years.

The district is broadly coterminous to the Bosworth parliamentary constituency, which is represented by Luke Evans (Conservative). The Groby ward is the only part of the district not in the Bosworth constituency, forming instead part of the Charnwood constituency.

=== Premises ===
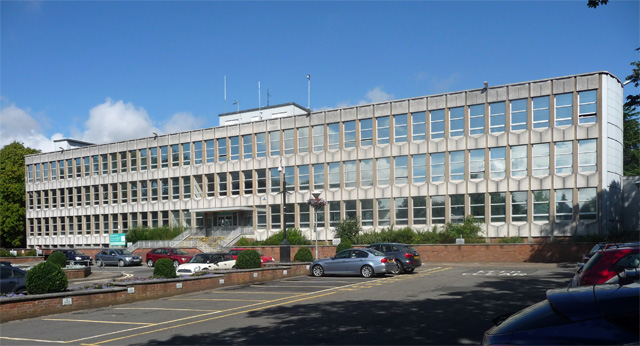
Former Council Offices, Argents Mead, Hinckley: demolished 2014.

The council is based at the Hinckley Hub on Rugby Road in Hinckley. The building was completed in 2013. Prior to 2013 the council was based at the Council Offices at Argents Mead, which had been built in 1968 for the old Hinckley Urban District Council.

== Geography ==
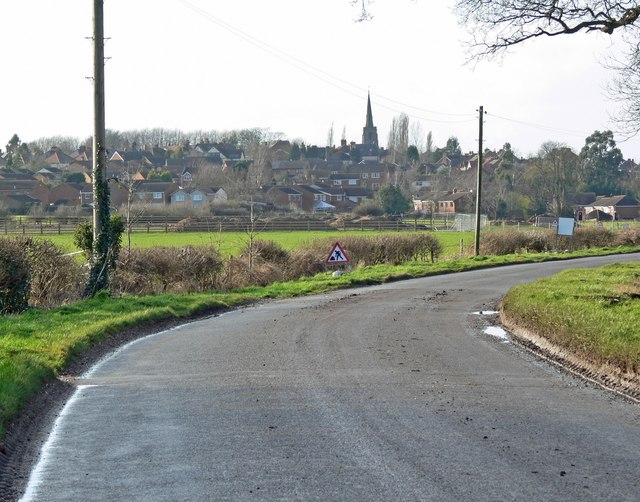
Earl Shilton, the second largest town in the borough

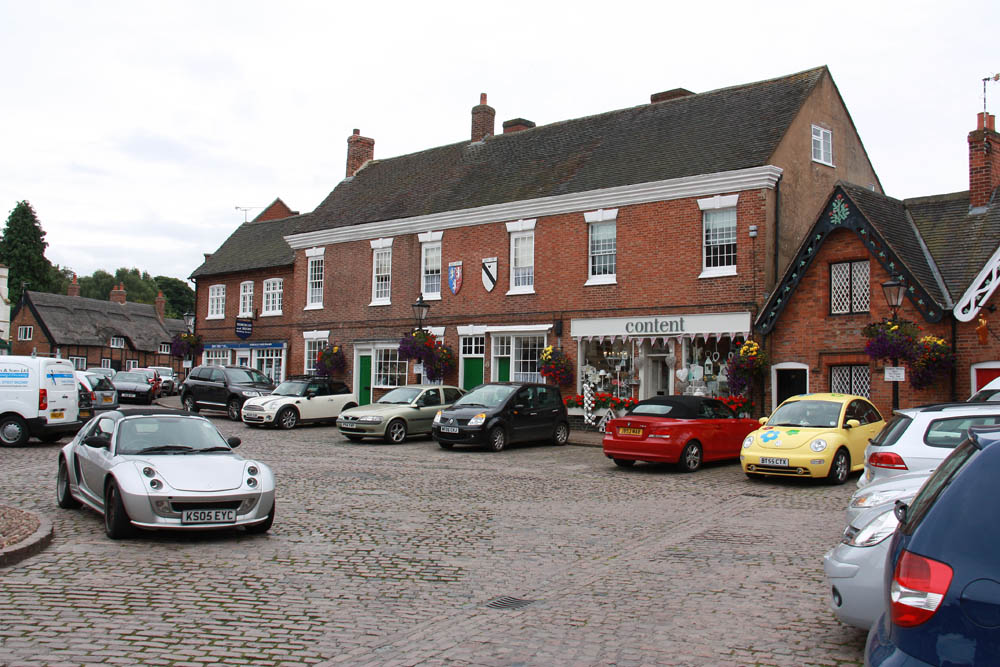
Market Bosworth, best known for the Battle of Bosworth and the third largest town in the borough

There are a number of geographical features which shape the landscape of Hinckley & Bosworth.

Two large neighbouring urban areas lie to the south of the borough: Hinckley and Burbage and Barwell and Earl Shilton. A narrow green wedge separates the two conurbations, which is increasingly being occupied by leisure facilities such as the Marston's Stadium and a new leisure centre. To the east of the wedge lies Burbage Common and Woods, a large popular green recreational area.

The west of the borough is largely flat in nature, dominated by the River Sence flood plain. This area of the borough is largely rural, consisting of a number of very small villages and hamlets.

At the northern and eastern edges of the borough lie several settlements (including Bagworth, Desford, Groby, Markfield, Ratby and Thornton) which largely relate to Leicester; in particular the most northern villages have little to do with the main administrative centre of Hinckley. The northern area of the borough also forms part of Charnwood Forest.

=== Places of interest ===
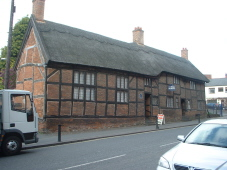
The framework knitters cottages, Hinckley

- The Geographical Centre of England is in the northwest of the borough at Lindley Hall Farm, near Fenny Drayton
- Burbage Common and Woods is one of the largest recreation areas in the borough consisting of 80 hectares of fields, meadows and woodland
- Hinckley Museum is in a range of 17th century timber-framed framework knitters' cottages.
- The Ashby Canal, the longest contour canal in England, passes through the borough from Hinckley in the south of the borough through Stoke Golding, Dadlington, Market Bosworth and Shackerstone before heading north to its current terminus at Snarestone.
- There is a large mill in Sheepy Magna to the west of the borough located on the River Sence
- Stoke Golding, is home to the medieval Church of St. Margaret's.
- The site of the Battle of Bosworth, administered by Leicestershire County Council, includes an interpretation centre at Ambion Hill, where Richard III encamped the night before the battle. St. James's Church at Dadlington is the place where many of the dead were buried and where a chantry was founded on their behalf.
- The Battlefield Line is a preserved railway which runs over part of the alignment of the former railway from Nuneaton to Ashby-de-la-Zouch. It is home to the Shackerstone Diesel Group.
- Twycross Zoo is notable for having the largest collection of primates in the world.
- Thornton Reservoir is a former 75-acre (300,000 m^{2}) drinking water reservoir that is no longer in use.
- A large collection of tropical birds is on display at Tropical Birdland near to Desford.

=== Railways ===
The only railway station in the borough on the National Rail network is Hinckley railway station on the South Leicestershire Line opened by the LNWR between 1862 and 1864. Currently there are direct services to Birmingham New Street and Leicester only with additional services to/from Cambridge and Stansted Airport in the peak.

There was also a branch line serving the market town of Market Bosworth which connected both Nuneaton and Hinckley to both Coalville and Ashby. The line closed to regular traffic in 1970 and is now part of the Battlefield Line. There was also a small stub to Hinckley but was never opened or used. There was also a stub to Nuneaton via Stoke Golding.

The last line that runs through part the borough is the Leicester to Burton Line which had a station in Desford, the station closed in 1964 but the line remains open for traffic. The station also served as a junction for the branch line to Leicester West Bridge on the now defunct Swannington and Leicester Railway. Although the section from Desford to Swannington remains open for freight traffic.

=== Demography ===
Hinckley and Bosworth is the second largest borough by population in Leicestershire and has seen significant population growth over recent decades; a trend forecast to continue at least into the short-medium term.

Population growth in Hinckley and Bosworth
Year	1951	1961	1971	1981	1991	2001	2011	2016	2021	2031
Population	59,720	64,242	74,744	86,622	96,203	100,142	105,078	110,100	114,000	121,000
Census								ONS	ONS Projections	

== Parishes ==
Most of the borough is covered by civil parishes. The pre-1974 Hinckley Urban District became an unparished area on the borough's creation in 1974, but four new parishes have since been created from parts of that area: Burbage, Stoke Golding (both created 1986), Earl Shilton (1995) and Barwell (2007), leaving just the central part of Hinckley itself as unparished. The parish council for Earl Shilton has declared its parish to be a town, allowing it to take the style "town council". (Whilst often referred to as a town, Market Bosworth Parish Council has not formally declared that parish to be a town.)

- Bagworth and Thornton, Barlestone, Barwell, Burbage
- Cadeby, Carlton
- Desford
- Earl Shilton
- Groby
- Higham on the Hill
- Market Bosworth, Markfield
- Nailstone, Newbold Verdon
- Osbaston
- Peckleton (including the villages of Kirkby Mallory and Stapleton)
- Ratby
- Shackerstone, Sheepy, Stanton-under-Bardon, Stoke Golding, Sutton Cheney
- Twycross
- Witherley

== Coat of arms ==
Coat of arms of Hinckley and Bosworth

Notes
Granted 15 November 1974
Crest
On a wreath of the colours a dragon Gules preying on a boar passant Argent.
Escutcheon
Per pale indented Argent and Gules on a chief Or three torteaux that in the centre charged with a pierced cinquefoil Ermine the others each charged with a mascle Or.
Supporters
On either side a ram reguardant Sable armed Or.
Motto
Post Proelia Concordia (After The Battle Concord)
