= Ambion Hill =

Hill in Leicestershire, England

Coordinates: 52.59631°N 1.40796°W

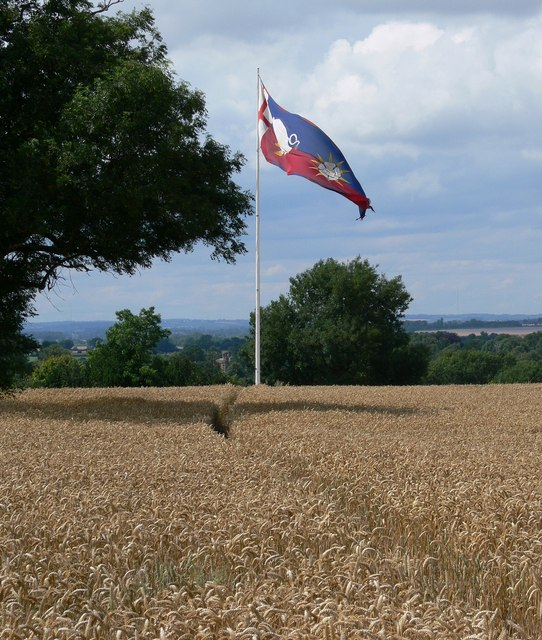
White Boar Banner of King Richard III on Ambion Hill

Ambion Hill is a hill in west Leicestershire, England, south of the town of Market Bosworth and lying south of the Sutton Cheney to Shenton road and north of Dadlington and of Fenn Lanes Roman road. The Ashby Canal passes to the south of the hill.

The hill is the site of the deserted medieval village of Anebein.

Ambion Hill was long considered to be the site of the Battle of Bosworth Field and is where the Bosworth Battlefield Heritage Centre is situated. The chronicler Raphael Holinshed wrote in 1577 that Richard III "pitched his field on a hill called Anne Beame, refreshed his soldiers and took his rest". This was taken by the 18th-century antiquary William Hutton to mean that Ambion Hill was the site of the battle. Hutton's book The Battle of Bosworth Field, published in 1788, was very influential in causing the hill to be accepted as the site of the battle.

Leicestershire County Council set up the battlefield visitor centre at what was Ambion Hill Farm, in 1974. The work of Leicester University historian Daniel Williams was used to interpret the battle. Numerous historians challenged the Ambion Hill location for the battle and this led to a large-scale project (from 2005 to 2009) by the Battlefields Trust, headed by Glenn Foard, to attempt to definitively find the true location of the battlefield. It is now accepted that the core of the battlefield lies either side of Fenn Lanes, about two miles south-west of the visitor centre and that Ambion Hill was Richard III's camp on the night before the battle. The battlefield heritage centre now has a viewing point with the Fenn Lane Farm site and other notable points marked. Ambion Hill remains within the revised registered battlefield.

A cairn built in 1813 marks the well from which according to tradition Richard III is said to have drunk prior to the battle. The cortège carrying Richard III's remains visited the hill during the procession before their interment in Leicester Cathedral in 2015.

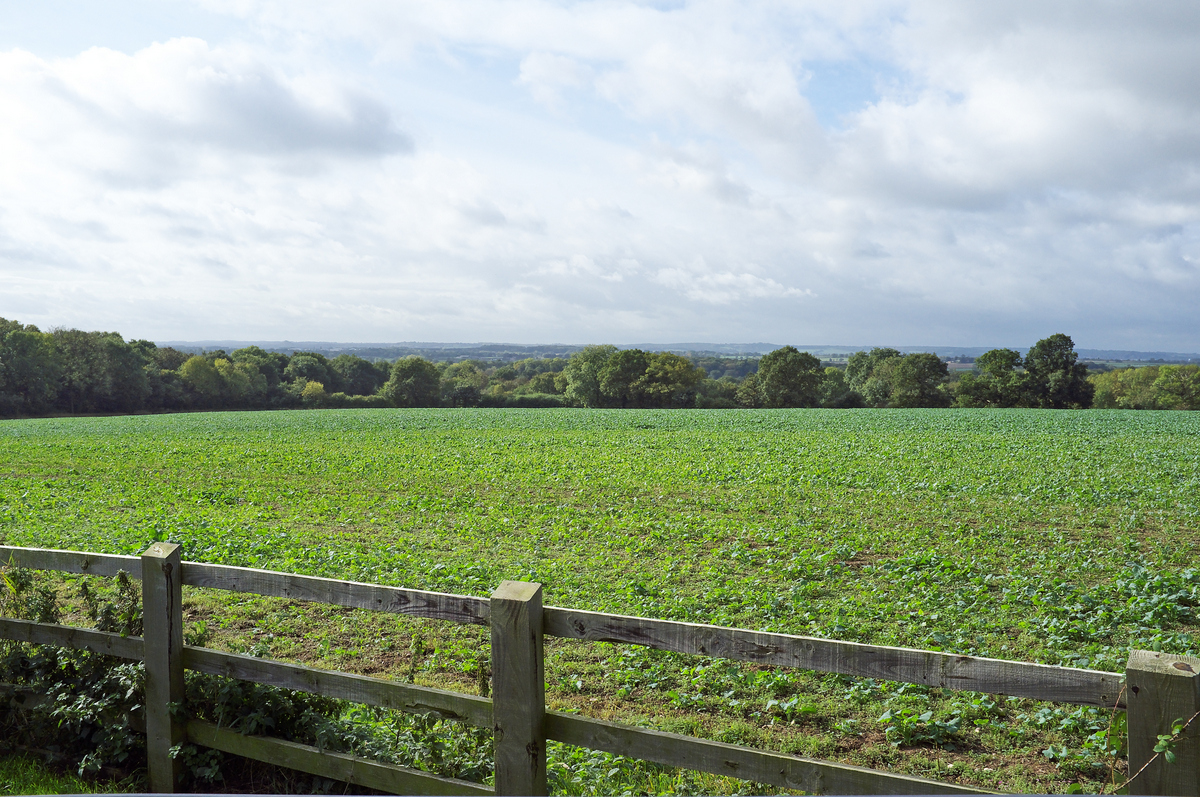
Ambion Hill view
