= Shenton =

Village in Leicestershire, England

Coordinates: 52.598363°N 1.432271°W

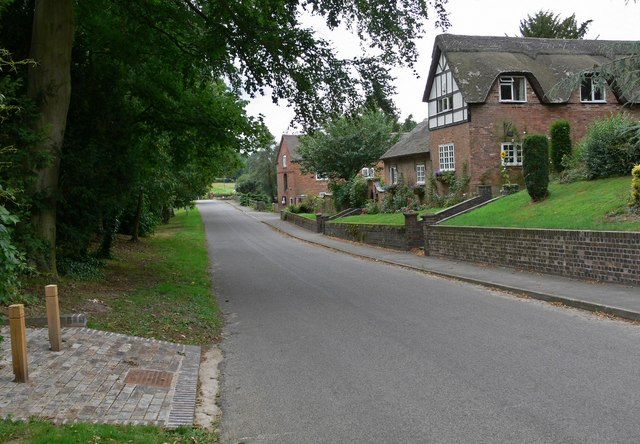
- Shenton (2008)

- Location within Leicestershire
- OS grid reference: SK385002
  - London: 94.01 mi (151.29 km)
- Civil parish: Dadlington and Sutton Cheney
- District: Hinckley and Bosworth
- Shire county: Leicestershire
- Region: East Midlands
- Country: England
- Sovereign state: United Kingdom
- Post town: NUNEATON
- Postcode district: CV13
- Dialling code: 01455
- Police: Leicestershire
- Fire: Leicestershire
- Ambulance: East Midlands
- UK Parliament: Hinckley and Bosworth
- Website: Sutton Cheney Parish Council

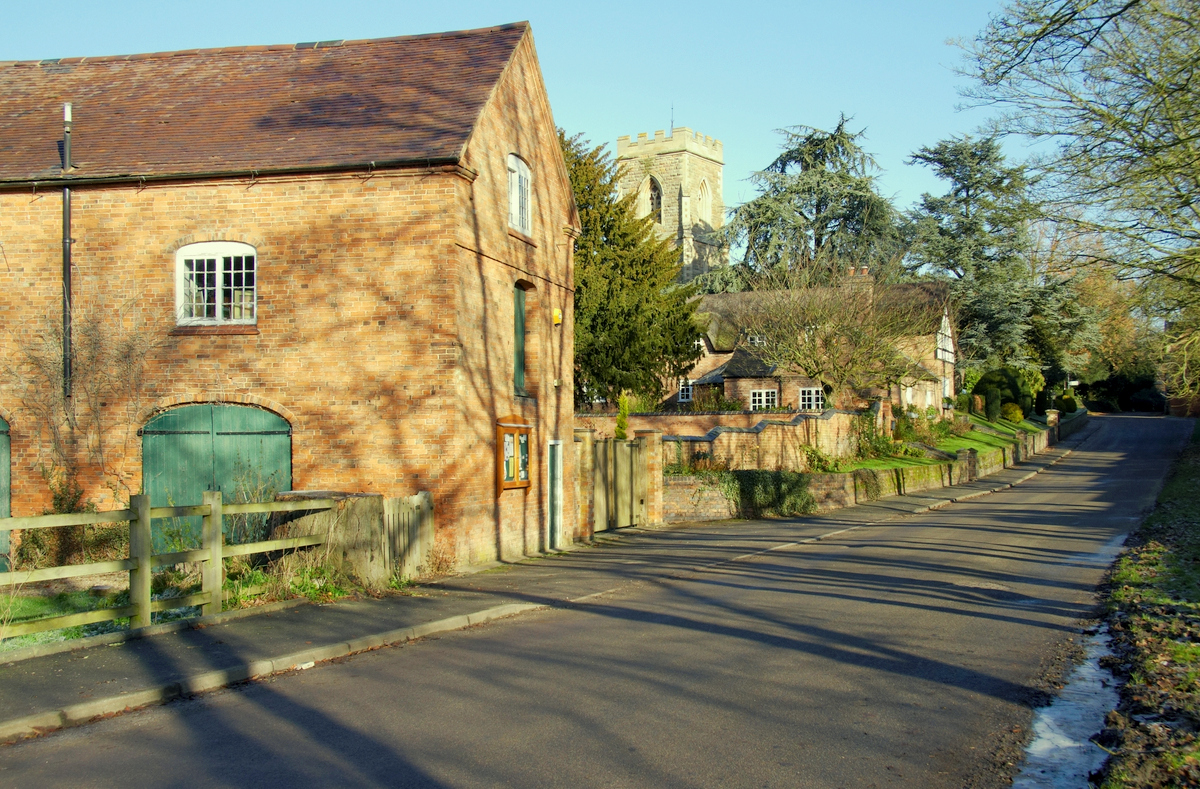
Shenton (2016)

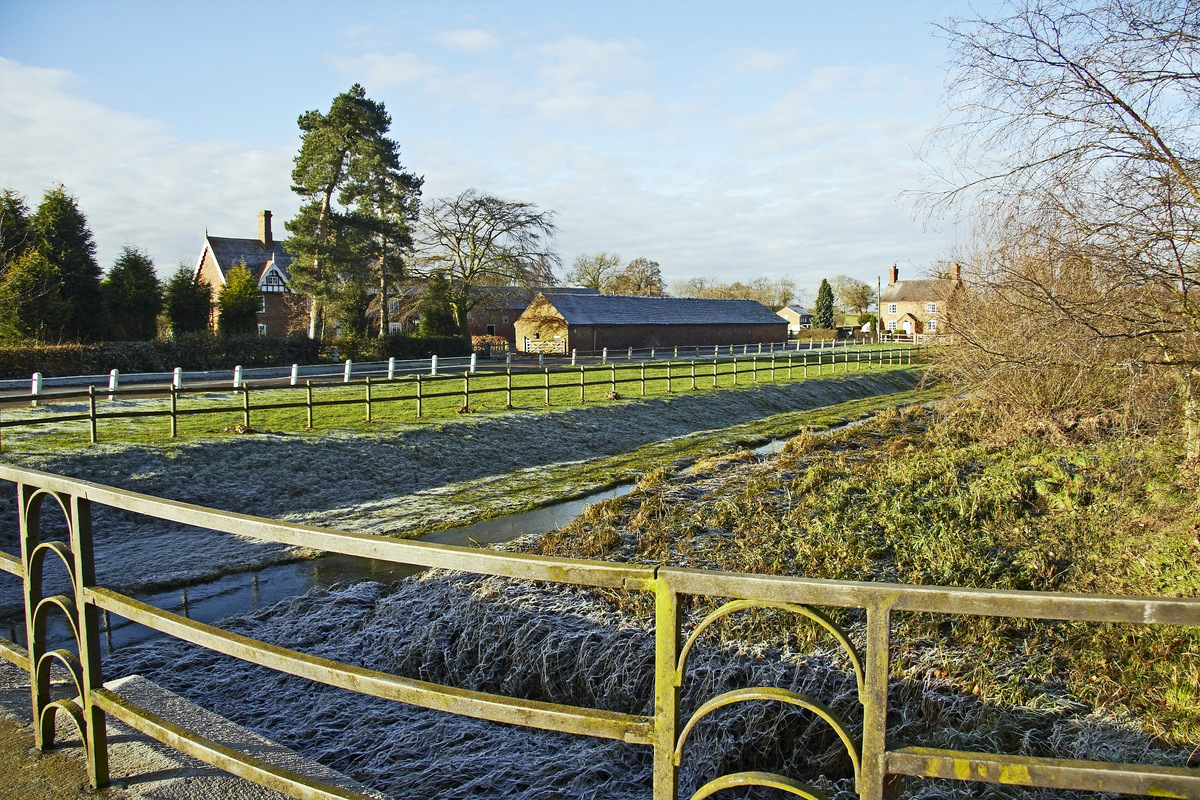
Shenton. View from Bosworth Road (2012)

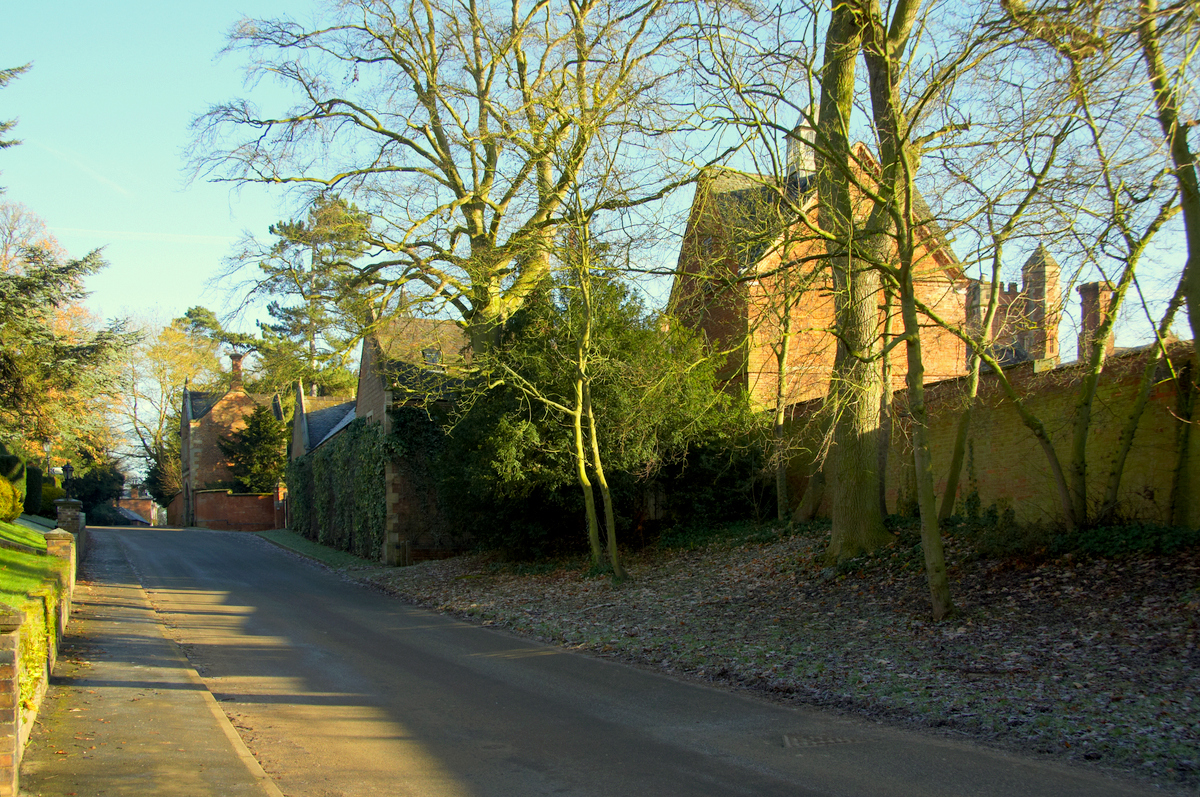
Shenton Hall dovecote (2012)

Shenton is a village and former civil parish, now in the parish of Dadlington and Sutton Cheney, in the Hinckley and Bosworth district, in the county of Leicestershire, England, situated 2.20 miles (3.54 km) south-west of Market Bosworth. Shenton was formerly a chapelry and township of the parish of Market Bosworth. The settlement is almost entirely agricultural, containing several farms. Much of the land has been in the same family since William Wollaston purchased the manor in 1625. It is essentially a privately owned estate village and has seen comparatively little modern development. It has been designated a conservation area. The settlement lies either side of the Sence Brook, which is crossed by a picturesque Victorian bridge. The area is fairly flat, and subject to flooding. In 1931 the parish had a population of 154.

== Shenton Hall ==
The hall has a fine gatehouse dated 1629, and a large, listed dovecote of 1719 within the hall grounds, close to the stable block. The main hall is a Grade II* listed building and was enlarged in the 19th century. The hall itself was sold by the Wollaston family following government requisition during the Second World War, but most of the estate land in the settlement and the surrounding farmland, was not sold.

== The Church ==
The Church of St John the Evangelist is a Grade II* listed building and is part of Market Bosworth Benefice. It was rebuilt by the Wollaston family in about 1860. Admiral Sir Alexander Dundas Young Arbuthnott is buried in the churchyard and the 17th-century memorial to William Wollaston was moved into the church.

== History ==
Shenton is close to the site of the Battle of Bosworth, which took place south-west of Market Bosworth. It is one of the four settlements named by the early 17th-century historian and local man, William Burton (of Lindley), to define the area of the battlefield. Some of the estate was subject to intensive archaeological surveying in recent years as part of the project to locate the site of the battlefield. The first, highly significant, find of round shot was made just west of Mill Lane, which leads from Shenton to Fenn Lanes Roman road. The Ashby Canal passes to the east of the village and the road to Sutton Cheney and Market Bosworth passes beneath it through a narrow aqueduct tunnel. By the 1870s, the chapelry as it was known then listed 42 houses, along with 206 residents.

Shenton became a parish in 1866, on 1 April 1935 the parish was abolished and merged with Sutton Cheney.

Shenton Train station lies some way from the village on the Sutton Cheney side, east of the canal. It is the southern terminus of the preserved Battlefield Line Railway, which runs to Shenton from Shackerstone. This is a section of what was originally the Ashby to Nuneaton railway line, opened in 1873. The station is located at the foot of Ambion Hill and is actually the reconstructed Humberstone Road Station from Leicester. The original Shenton station was demolished in the 1940s, except for a small lamp room that now serves as the Station Pottery.
