= Hinckley Hub =

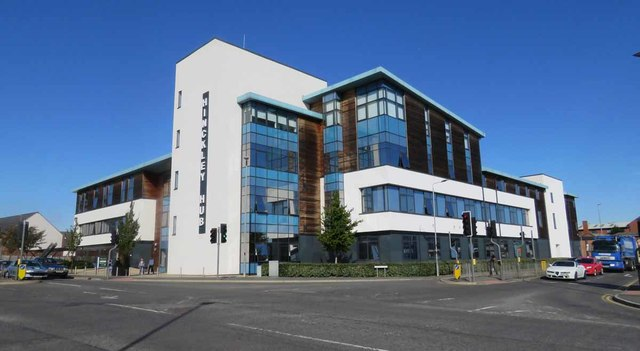
- Hinckley Hub in 2017

General information
- Location: Rugby Road, Hinckley, Leicestershire
- Coordinates: 52.535637°N 1.375855°W
- Inaugurated: June 2013
- Owner: Hinckley and Bosworth Borough Council

Design and construction
- Architect(s): MRP
- Main contractor: Stepnell

The Hinckley Hub is a municipal building on Rugby Road in the town of Hinckley, Leicestershire, England. The building is the headquarters of Hinckley and Bosworth Borough Council.

== History ==
=== Former Council Offices (1904–2014) ===
Hinckley Urban District Council was established in 1894. The first council offices, in Station Road, were designed in the Gothic Revival style, built in red brick and were completed in April 1904. As the responsibilities of the council grew new offices were required. From 1968, the council was headquartered in newly built council offices in the Argents Mead park — a green space which was donated in 1948 by Margery Payne. In 2011, it was confirmed the building would be demolished. The council then approached developers, asking them to put forward their designs for a new civic office to be built elsewhere in the town. Demolition works commenced on 3 March 2014. A leisure centre was opened on the site in May 2016.

=== Construction and opening (2012–2013) ===
Construction works for the Hinckley Hub officially commenced on 9 January 2012. It was built on the site of the former Flude factory, though part of its original structure was retained. In late 2012, Oadby-based building contractors Hallam Contracts, who were leading the construction of the new Hub building went into liquidation. As a result, Rugby-based contractor Stepnell were appointed by the council's development partners MRP and landlord Aviva to complete the construction works.

On 17 June 2013, the Hub publicly opened. While mainly operating as the civic offices of Hinckley and Bosworth Borough Council, staff from partner agencies, including Leicestershire County Council and Jobcentre Plus also work there.
