= Stapleton, Leicestershire =

Village in Leicestershire, England

Coordinates: 52.58212°N 1.36007°W

Stapleton
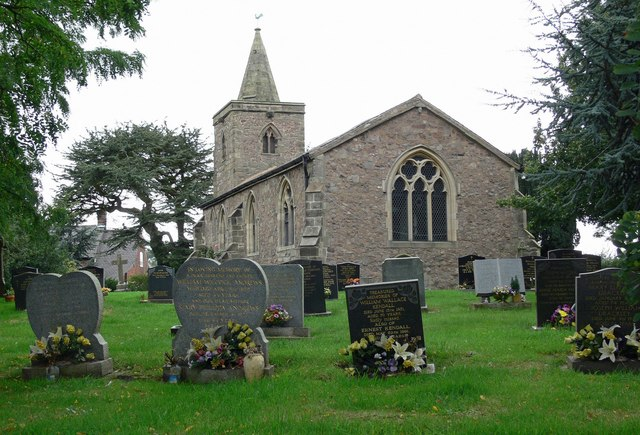
- Saint Martin's Church

- Location within Leicestershire
- Population: 427 (2001 census)
- OS grid reference: SP434984
- Civil parish: Kirkby Mallory, Peckleton and Stapleton
- District: Hinckley and Bosworth
- Shire county: Leicestershire
- Region: East Midlands
- Country: England
- Sovereign state: United Kingdom
- Post town: Leicester
- Postcode district: LE9
- Dialling code: 01455
- Police: Leicestershire
- Fire: Leicestershire
- Ambulance: East Midlands
- UK Parliament: Hinckley and Bosworth

Stapleton is a village and former civil parish, now in the parish of Kirkby Mallory, Peckleton and Stapleton, in the Hinckley and Bosworth district, in south-west Leicestershire, England, about ten miles south-west of Leicester city centre. Its population was 427 people at the 2001 census. In 1931 the parish had a population of 252. Stapleton was formerly a chapelry in Barwell parish, from 1866 Stapleton was a civil parish in its own right until it was abolished on 1 April 1935 and merged with Peckleton.

Stapleton is built on part of a long ridge that begins in Barwell to the south, and is followed by the A447 road north, gaining height until it reaches Osbaston, where it descends into a tributary of the River Sence. In terms of rivers, Stapleton's nearest major river is the River Sence, but on a more local level, the River Tweed is the closest waterway, a tributary of which rises in the north of the village. The River Tweed's main source rises from Brick Kiln Hill, just north-east of Hinckley from where it flows north along the eastern edge of Barwell before turning west and continuing to travel in a north-westerly direction.

The village is centred on St. Martin's Church (built in about 1300 according to Pevsner) which is to be found on Church Lane in the southern end of the village and was most probably established as a connection point for travellers journeying between Ashby-de-la-Zouch Castle and the areas around Coventry, Warwick and Kenilworth.

The earliest known reference to the village appears in a charter from King of Mercia - Wiglaf to the Abbot of Crowland in Lincolnshire written in 833, making grants of "two ploughlands in Stapleton and Sutton". Stapleton is mentioned in the Domesday Book as having a population of five or six families and being owned by Hugh de Grandmesnil, who had been given most of West Leicester by William the Conqueror after the conquest.
