= Market Bosworth Country Park =

Country park in Leicestershire, England

Coordinates: 52°37′28.88″N 1°23′35.15″W

Country Park

Market Bosworth Country Park is to the east of Market Bosworth town, in Leicestershire, England. The 35 hectares (86 acres) landscaped Country Park was formerly part of Bosworth Hall deer parkland. The park features a lake, a planted arboretum with many different exotic species, a wildflower meadow and a community woodland. The park has been award the Green Flag Award.

== Features & Activities ==
The park has a picnic area, lakes and fishing areas and play areas for children. There is parking on site (Pay on exit) and toilet facilities both are open 365 days of the year.

The park is home to Market Bosworth Country Park parkrun, a free timed 5km running and walking event held every Saturday at 9am.

== Access ==
Access off the former B585 east of Market Bosworth. Market Bosworth Country Park has wide open spaces for recreation including horse riding.
