= Glenn Foard =

Glenn R. Foard (born c.1953) is an English landscape archaeologist, best known for discovering the location of the final phases of the Battle of Bosworth Field (1485). He is Reader in Battlefield Archaeology at the University of Huddersfield.

== Early career ==
Foard obtained his first degree from University College, London, in 1974, and went on to take an MA at the Institute of Archaeology. He later obtained a PhD in battlefield archaeology from the University of East Anglia (2008).

== Battlefield projects ==
Foard is known for his work on major projects on behalf of the Battlefields Trust, English Heritage, Historic Scotland and Time Team. While working for the Battlefields Trust, he led archaeological surveys of the sites of the Battle of Edgehill and the Battle of Bosworth. Foard was appointed by Leicestershire County Council in 2005, in an exercise supported by the Heritage Lottery Fund, to investigate the possible sites of the battle and try to establish its exact location.

In 2009, Foard and his team discovered artefacts to support his theory that the site where the Bosworth Visitor Centre is currently located is several miles from the actual spot where the battle was fought. These included a silver-gilt badge in the shape of a boar, the emblem of King Richard III of England, who was killed in the battle. Richard Holmes called it "certainly the most important discovery about Bosworth in my lifetime".

== Works ==
- Naseby: The Decisive Campaign. Whitstable: Pryor Publications, 1995.
- The Making of a County History: John Bridges' Northamptonshire (with A E Brown). Leicester: University of Leicester, 1994.
- Naseby. Pen & Sword Military, 2004. ISBN 9781844151325
- Mapping Ancient Landscapes in Northamptonshire (with Alison Deegan). English Heritage, 2008. ISBN 978-1905624423
- An Atlas of Northamptonshire (with David Hall and Tracey Partida). Oxbow Books, 2012. ISBN 978-1842175118
- Bosworth 1485: A Battlefield Rediscovered (with Anne Curry). Oxbow Books, 2013. ISBN 978-1782971733
