= Market Bosworth =

Market town in Leicestershire, England

Coordinates: 52.6239°N 1.4017°W

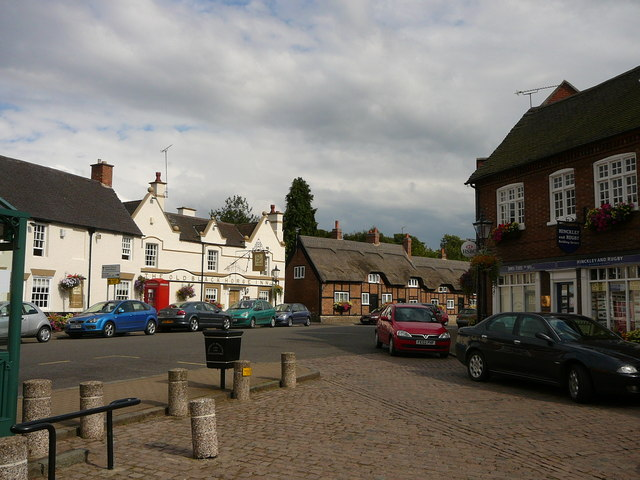
- Market Bosworth Market Place

- Location within Leicestershire
- Population: 2,097 Census 2011
- OS grid reference: SK4003
- District: Hinckley and Bosworth
- Shire county: Leicestershire
- Region: East Midlands
- Country: England
- Sovereign state: United Kingdom
- Post town: NUNEATON
- Postcode district: CV13
- Dialling code: 01455
- Police: Leicestershire
- Fire: Leicestershire
- Ambulance: East Midlands
- UK Parliament: Hinckley and Bosworth

Market Bosworth (/ˈbɒzwərθ/ BOZ-wərth) is a market town and civil parish in Leicestershire, England. At the 2001 Census, it had a population of 1,906, increasing to 2,097 at the 2011 census. It is most famously near to the site of the Battle of Bosworth, decisive final battle of the Wars of the Roses.

In 1974, Market Bosworth Rural District merged with Hinckley Rural District to form the district of Hinckley and Bosworth.

== History ==
Building work here and at other sites has revealed evidence of a settlement on the hill since the Bronze Age. Remains of a Roman villa have been found on the east side of Barton Road. Bosworth as an Anglo-Saxon village dates from the 8th century.

The name Bosworth derives from the Old English bosaworð meaning 'Bosa's enclosure'.

Before the Norman Conquest of 1066, there were two manors at Bosworth, one belonging to an Anglo-Saxon knight named Fernot, and some sokemen. Following the Norman conquest, as recorded in the Domesday Book of 1086, both the Anglo-Saxon manors and the village were part of the lands awarded by William the Conqueror to the Count of Meulan from Normandy, Robert de Beaumont, 1st Earl of Leicester. Subsequently, the village passed by marriage dowry to the English branching of the French House of Harcourt.

Edward I gave a royal charter to Sir William Harcourt allowing a market to be held every Wednesday. The village took the name Market Bosworth from 12 May 1285 and on this day became a "town" by common definition. The two oldest buildings in Bosworth, St. Peter's Church and the Red Lion pub, were built during the 14th century.

The Battle of Bosworth took place to south of the town in 1485 as the final significant battle in the Wars of the Roses between the House of Lancaster and the House of York, which resulted in the death of King Richard III.

Following the discovery of the remains of Richard III in Leicester during 2012, the funeral cortège for his reburial passed through the town on Sunday 22 March 2015 on its way to Leicester Cathedral. This event is now commemorated with a floor plaque in front of the war memorial in the town square.

In 1509 the manor passed from the Harcourts to the Grey family. In 1554, following the beheading of Lady Jane Grey, the manor of Bosworth was among lands confiscated in the name of Mary I and her husband Philip II of Spain. They awarded the manor to the Catholic nobleman Edward Hastings. In 1567, his heirs sold it to Sir Wolstan Dixie, Lord Mayor of London, who never lived in Bosworth.

The first Dixie to live in Bosworth was his grand-nephew, Sir Wolstan Dixie of Appleby Magna, who moved to the town in 1608. He started construction of a manor house and park, as well as establishing the free Dixie Grammar School. The modern Bosworth Hall was the work of Sir Beaumont Dixie, 2nd Baronet (1629–1692).

In 1885 the 11th Baronet "Beau" Dixie was forced to auction Bosworth Hall to pay his gambling debts. It was bought by Lady Agnes Tollemache, whose husband Charles Tollemache Scott enlarged the estate, planted woodlands, and rebuilt the lodges and farms. Lady Agnes's daughter, Wenefryde Scott, sold the estate in 1913.

The War Memorial in the town square honours nineteen local men who died in the First World War, and eleven men who died in the Second World War. The town's historic cattle market operated until 1996.

== Notable residents ==
This includes people born, educated, or having lived in Market Bosworth.

- William Bradshaw (1571–1618) – Puritan
- Dr. John Charles Bucknill (1817 Market Bosworth – 1897) – asylum reformer, psychiatrist
- Sir Charles Carter Chitham (1886–1972), policeman in British India
- Richard Dawes (1708–1766) – Latin scholar
- Lady Florence Dixie (1855–1905) – wife of the 11th baronet; travel writer, war correspondent, and feminist
- Sir Wolstan Dixie of Market Bosworth (1597–1630) – founder of the grammar school
- Sir Wolstan Dixie, 4th Baronet (1700–1767) – most colourful of the 13 Dixie baronets
- Rev. Arthur Benoni Evans (1781–1854) – scholar, headmaster of the Dixie Grammar

- Sir John Evans (1823 Burnham – 1908) – his son, treasurer of the Royal Society
- Sebastian Evans (1830 Market Bosworth – 1909) – poet. Revised his father's book Leicestershire Words, Phrases, and Proverbs, (1848, 1881)

- Davey Graham (1940–2008) - influential folk guitarist, born at Bosworth Infirmary (now Bosworth Hall Hotel) and commemorated with a blue memorial plaque
- James Holden (born 1979) – electronic music producer
- Thomas Hooker (1586 Markfield – 1647) – Puritan, founder of Connecticut
- Samuel Johnson – essayist and lexicographer; in 1732 worked at the Dixie Grammar after leaving Oxford because of debt, but left after four months, unable to bear the "boorish" 4th Baronet
- Andy Morrell (born 1974) – footballer
- Colin Pitchfork (born 1960) - First person convicted of murder using DNA Fingerprinting, attended school in Market Bosworth
- Cliff Price (1900–1959) – footballer for Southampton F.C. in the 1920s
- Thomas Simpson (1710–1760) – mathematician
- Ollie Smith (born 1982) - England international rugby player began his career with Market Bosworth RFC
- Jake Dennis (born 1995) - Racing driver, 2023 Formula E World Champion.

== Community ==
The Town entered into the Britain in Bloom competition on the 500th anniversary of the battle in 1985. Floral decorations were displayed around the town. The success of this entry caused the formation of the "Bosworth in Bloom Committee", to prepare for more displays. In 2012 – the Town reached the national finals for England and won a Gold Award.

The town has two football teams, AFC Market Bosworth (playing mostly on Saturdays) and Market Bosworth FC (mostly Sundays). Both have teams across various age groups from under 5s to over 35s. The triathlon club and cricket club are based at the same ground as Market Bosworth FC, the sports and social club.

The town also has a rugby club, tennis club and lawn bowls clubs.

== Education ==
The town has four schools, Market Bosworth Primary and Junior School, The Market Bosworth School, and the private Dixie Grammar School, and the newly established Hinckley House School.

== Media ==
Television signals can only be received from the Sutton Coldfield TV transmitter which broadcast programmes from Birmingham. However, BBC East Midlands and ITV Central are also received through cable and satellite television such as Freesat and Sky.

Local radio stations are BBC Radio Leicester on 104.9 FM, Capital East Midlands on 105.4 FM, Greatest Hits Radio on 106.0 FM and Smooth East Midlands on 101.4 FM.

The town is served by the Leicester Mercury and Hinckley Times newspapers.

== Town centre ==
The town centre has many historic buildings. In the corner of the Market Place are two cottages, known as the Rose and Thistle Cottages, named to confirm the link of the Dixie family to England and Scotland. The town also has three churches, Anglican, Catholic and Free Churches.

== Parks and recreation ==
Market Bosworth Country Park and Bosworth Water Park (Lakeside Lodges) offer outside recreation. The site of the Battle of Bosworth is a few miles south of the town. Market Bosworth was previously served by the Ashby and Nuneaton Joint Railway, which is now the heritage Battlefield Line Railway and runs at weekends from Shackerstone, via Market Bosworth station to Shenton. The Ashby Canal runs adjacent to the railway and is served by Bosworth Marina with moorings for 150 boats.

There is an hourly bus service to Leicester, known as the 153. The LC6 service stops in Market Bosworth as it runs between Ibstock and Hinckley. As well as the LC12, which runs between Measham and Witherley.
