= Measham =

Village in Leicestershire, England

Coordinates: 52.706139°N 1.508045°W

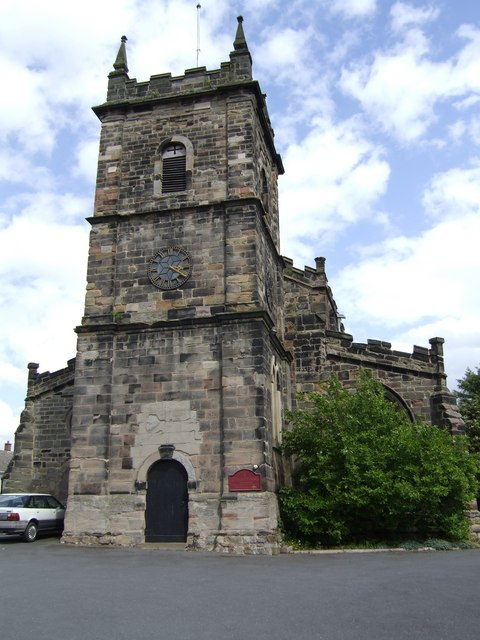
- St Lawrence Church, Measham

- Location within Leicestershire
- Population: 5,209
- OS grid reference: SK 33077 11844
  - London: 177 km (110 mls)
- Civil parish: Measham
- District: North West Leicestershire
- Shire county: Leicestershire
- Region: East Midlands
- Country: England
- Sovereign state: United Kingdom
- Post town: SWADLINCOTE
- Postcode district: DE12
- Dialling code: 01530
- Police: Leicestershire
- Fire: Leicestershire
- Ambulance: East Midlands
- UK Parliament: North West Leicestershire

Measham is a large village in the North West Leicestershire district in Leicestershire, England, near the Derbyshire, Staffordshire and Warwickshire boundaries. It lies off the A42, 4 1/2 miles (7.2 km) south of Ashby de la Zouch, in the National Forest. Historically it was in an exclave of Derbyshire absorbed into Leicestershire in 1897. The name is thought to mean "homestead on the River Mease". The village was once part of Derbyshire before being transferred to Leicestershire.

== History ==
=== Early history ===
The name Meas-Ham suggests it was founded in the Saxon period between 350 and 1000 AD.

Just before the Norman Conquest of 1066, the village belonged to "Earl Algar". The Domesday Book of 1086 has it belonging directly to the King, as part of a royal estate centred at Repton. Its taxable value was assessed at a mere 2 geld units, containing land for three ploughs, 20 acres (8.1 hectares) of meadow, and a square furlong (10 acres, 4.0 hectares) of woodland.

=== Middle Ages ===
The manor passed from the crown to the Earls of Chester. In 1235 it was in the possession of Clementia (Clemence de Fougères), widow of Ranulf de Blondeville, 6th Earl of Chester. Measham Museum states that the manor belonged to the De Measham family, which held it until 1308. Given the ownership by the crown and then the Earls of Chester, neither actually resident, it appears the De Measham family held the manor as feudal tenants, rather than formal owners, probably in return for military service.

By the 13th century, the rights to the church appear to have passed to Repton Priory, as in 1272 King Henry III issued a charter including Measham among several churches and chapelries it possessed. The original chapel of ease dated from 1172, but the present St Laurence's Church was built in 1340, under the auspices of Repton Priory.

On 24 March 1311, King Edward II granted charters to William de Bereford, Lord of the Manor of Measham, to hold a market and a fair. The charters allowed for a market on Tuesdays and an annual three-day fair around the festival of the Translation of St Thomas the Martyr (7 July). By 1817 both market and fair had ceased.

This medieval settlement is thought to have been mainly agricultural, but coalmining is known to have taken place as early as the 13th century. Indeed, William De Bereford died getting coal; records of his death show the village's coal resources to have been worth 13s 4d (£0.67) a year.

In 1355, Edmund de Bereford, son of William, died leaving the manor of Measham to three heirs: Joan de Ellesfield, John de Maltravers and Margaret de Audley. During the 15th century, the manor came into the hands of Walter Blount, 1st Baron Mountjoy. In 1454, the manor was in the possession of Sir William Babington at the time of his death; and in 1474 it was in the possession of John Babington (presumably his son).

=== 16th–17th centuries ===
In 1596 Measham was dismissed by William Wyrley as "a village belonging to Lord Shefield, in which are many coal mines, [but] little else worthy of remembrance." It was omitted altogether from Richard Blome's gazetteer of market towns in 1673.

In 1563 the manor belonged to Walter Blount, 1st Baron Mountjoy. However, by 1616 it had passed to Sir Francis Anderson, only to return to the Sheffield family, as it was owned by Edmund Sheffield, 2nd Duke of Buckingham and Normanby in 1712.

=== 18th–19th centuries ===
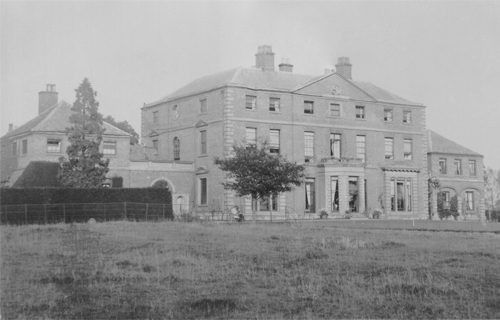
Measham Hall: Built 1767, demolished 1959 due to mining subsidence

The manor passed to William Wollaston. He sold it in 1780 to Joseph Wilkes for £50,000, on whose death it was bought by Rev. Thomas Fisher. In 1767, William Abney built an alternative manor at Measham Field, north-east of the village, which by 1817 had passed to his son Edward. This would become known as Measham Hall, a seven-bay mid-Georgian mansion. However, the advent of coalmining caused the Hall to suffer subsidence. It was demolished by the National Coal Board in 1959.

By the early 19th century, Measham church was still associated with Repton parish, as a "parochial chapelry".

==== Industry ====
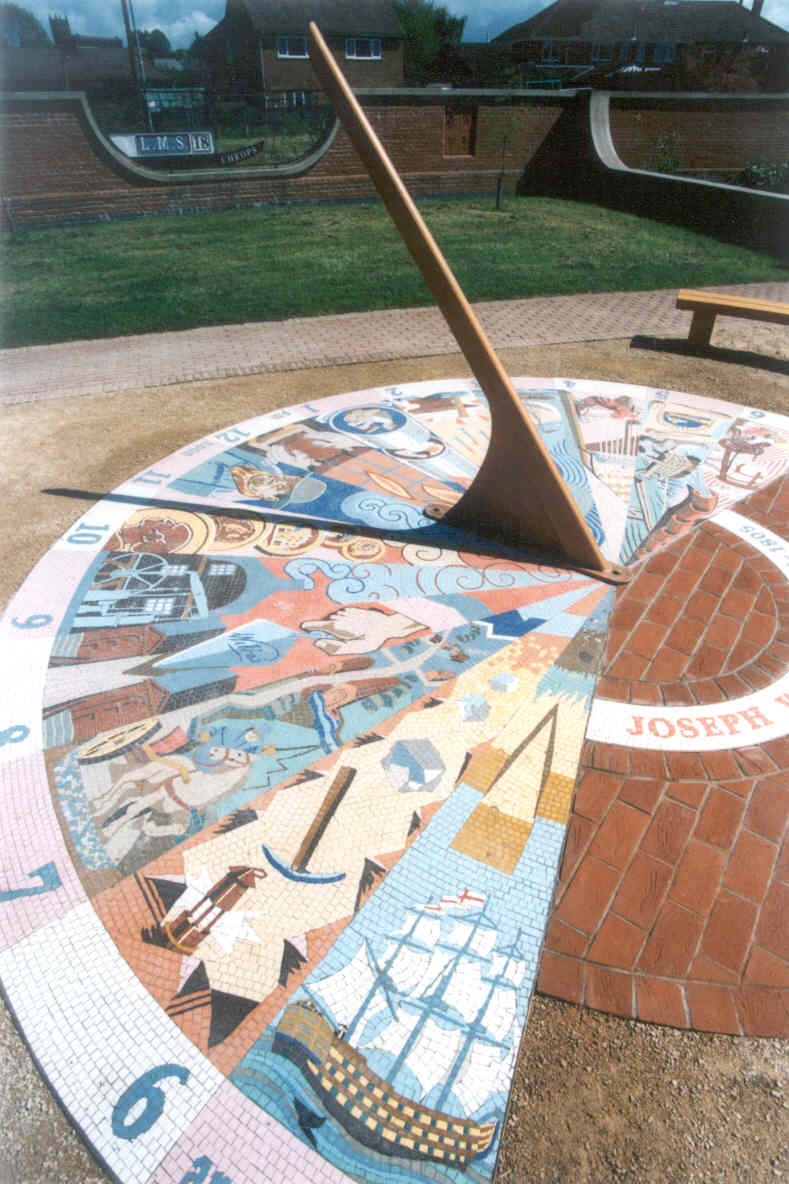
Sundial commemorating Joseph Wilkes, by the artist Steve Field, erected in 2009, near the former railway station

Around the time of Joseph Wilkes, Measham went through a prosperous period associated with the Industrial Revolution. This lasted into the 20th century. At the beginning of the 19th century, Ashby Canal was built through the village. The Ashby and Nuneaton Joint Railway followed, opening towards the end of the century. The village was also on the main Birmingham–Nottingham road (later the A453). It became a hub of local industry, famous for its brickworks: Joseph Wilkes's "Jumb Bricks" were enlarged to reduce payments of brick tax. The village industry included banking, breweries, coal mines and brick-making (with clay from local clay pits), a tramway, and boot, lace, cotton, carding and bleach mills.

A market hall was said to have been built by Wilkes about the turn of the 19th century, but by 1817 the market had ceased and the market-house at 58 High Street was being converted into a dwelling. This later became known as Cross House. The original market place was an area to the rear in Queen Street, now a car park.

The village Baptist chapel was built in 1811, although Baptist ministers had been active since the 1730s. A Temperance Hall built in 1852 now serves as the Age Concern building.

In 1839 the village received an official visit from Queen Adelaide, who in her widowhood frequented the area, staying at nearby Gopsall Park, home of her previous Lord Chamberlain, The Earl of Howe. Queen Street was named in her honour after her visit.

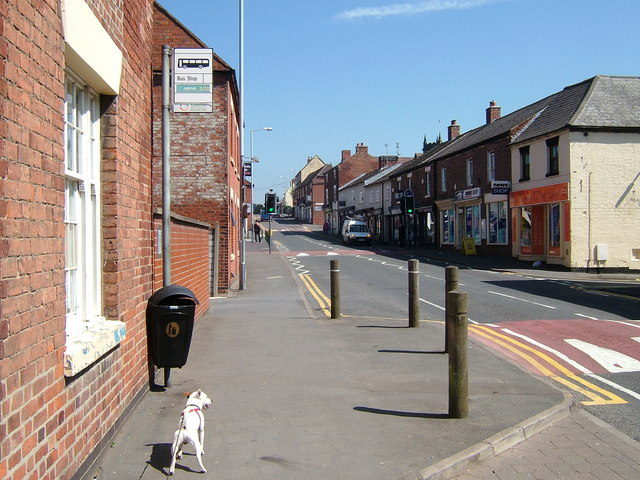
Measham High Street

By 1848 the population had reached 1,615. A further Methodist chapel and a Catholic church were built. The latter, funded by a local lady aristocrat, has since been demolished for housing.

=== 20th–21st centuries ===
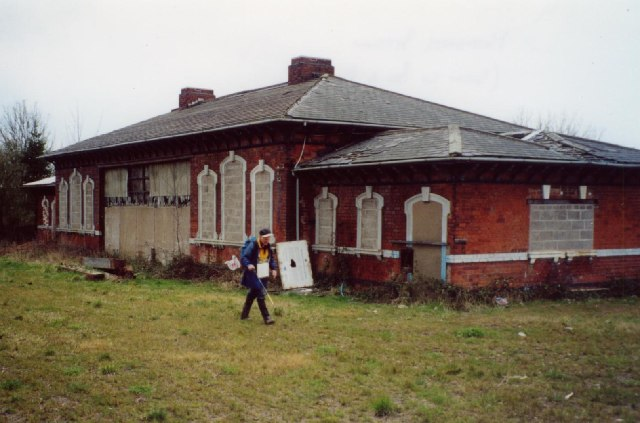
Measham Station before renovation

Measham continued to grow residentially and industrially in the 20th and 21st centuries. Large council and private housing estates were built and the population reached 4,849 in 2001. Development of a British Car Auctions site in the south-west of the village after the Second World War prompted what has become the Westminster Industrial Estate.

The 20th century also brought periods of sharp decline. Passenger services on the Ashby and Nuneaton Joint Railway ceased in 1931. Freight traffic continued until 1971, after which the line was dismantled. Ashby Canal similarly closed in 1957. The traditional industries began to die, with the boot and shoe factory closing in the 1960s and Measham Colliery in 1986. The 1960s saw many of the village's fine buildings demolished, including the Manor House, Measham Hall and the Vicarage.

Development has resumed in recent years. Years of neglect and disrepair at Measham's former railway station ended when it was turned into new premises for the Measham Museum. The old engine sheds have become industrial workshops and the engine yards a millennium garden and public green space. A new library and a leisure centre were also built in the last decade, and there are plans to resuscitate the canal. Due to housing being constructed along the original route through Measham, the canal will follow the route of the old railway, with a wharf, adjacent visitors' centre, shops and cafés planned for the village centre.

== Measham teapots ==
Measham has a long pottery history: extraction of clay was recorded in the 13th century. The Measham Ware associated with canals and narrow boats was made from the last quarter of the 19th century until about 1914 (other sources say 1910), not in Measham, but in nearby villages, mainly Church Gresley. It is thought to have gained the attribute Measham from large sales by Mrs Anne Bonas from a shop in Measham High Street.

Measham ware has a dark brown Rockingham glaze with white-clay additions colourfully painted, usually with flowers and often a personal motto. Most commonly seen are teapots, often with a miniature-teapot shape as a finial.

Earliest known production was in 1870 by William Mason of Church Gresley (later Mason Cash); this list refers to pieces as Motto Ware, later also Barge Ware due to canal associations. Measham Ware was popular with canal people. On passing through Measham on the Ashby Canal, they would place their order for a personalised teapot as they passed through and collect it on their next visit. Measham Ware was also popular among farm labourers in Norfolk and Suffolk: after harvesting in their own counties, they often travelled to Burton Upon Trent to work in the maltings and other industries associated with brewing. Measham Ware became a popular gift to take home. Locals often bought them as wedding gifts, passing them down the generations at weddings. Production of Measham Ware ended around 1910–1914, although modern reproductions have been produced more recently. There is a large collection in the Measham Museum. London's Victoria and Albert Museum also has an example on display.

A unique example of a Measham Bargeware Teapot showing the original name of the nearby village of Woodville as "Wooden Box"

== Rail transport ==
The nearest main line railway station is Atherstone (11 miles, 18 km). Others nearby are Burton-on-Trent, Leicester, Tamworth and Nuneaton.

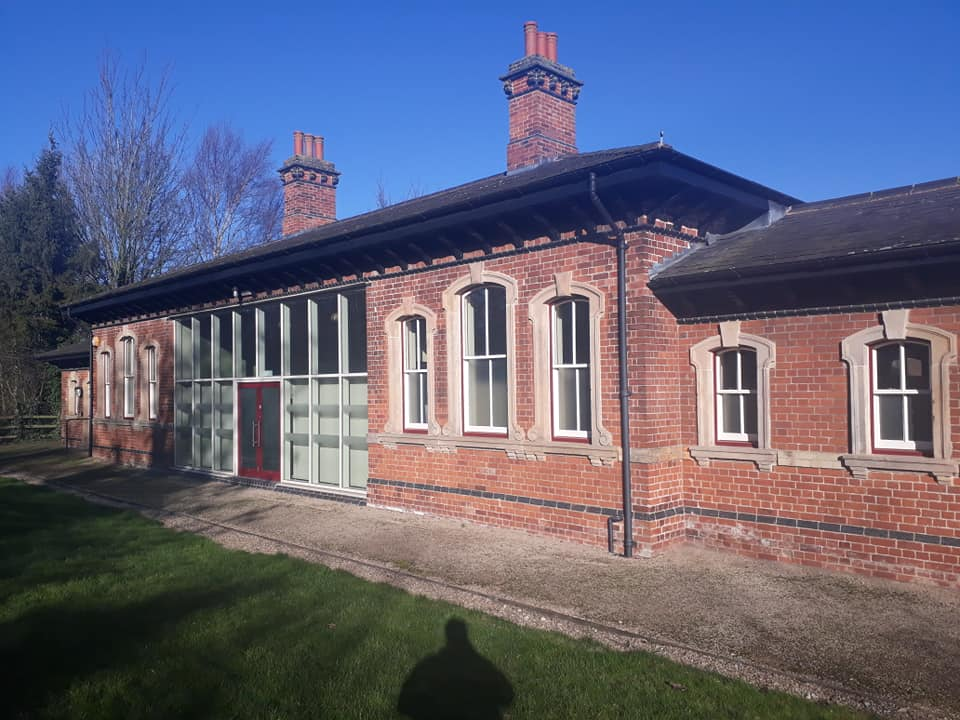
Former Measham station, now a museum

A branch of the Ashby and Nuneaton Joint Railway (ANJR) opened to Measham in 1873, with through services to Burton-on Trent, Leicester, Ashby-de-la-Zouch, Moira and Shackerstone, allowing changes for Coalville and Loughborough via Hugglescote. The station closed in 1931, but the line stayed open until 1970, when British Rail closed the Shackerstone–Measham section. The stub to Moira remained for coal traffic from Donisthorpe Colliery until 1981. The Battlefield Line Railway, a surviving section of the ANJR, now runs services to Shenton via Market Bosworth. It had been hoped to extend this to Snarestone, but nothing came of it. Leicestershire County Council recently renovated the station building as part of the Ashby Canal restoration, to serve as premises for the Measham Museum.

== Minorca opencast ==
In 2011 UK Coal received planning permission to develop an opencast coal mine on the site of the former Minorca colliery on the outskirts of Measham. Measuring 1 mile (1.6 km) by .5 miles (0.80 km), it will yield 1,250,000 tonnes (1,380,000 tons) of coal over five years, and 250,000 tonnes (280,000 tons) of clay. The development was opposed by some local residents worried about environmental effects and vehicle noise.

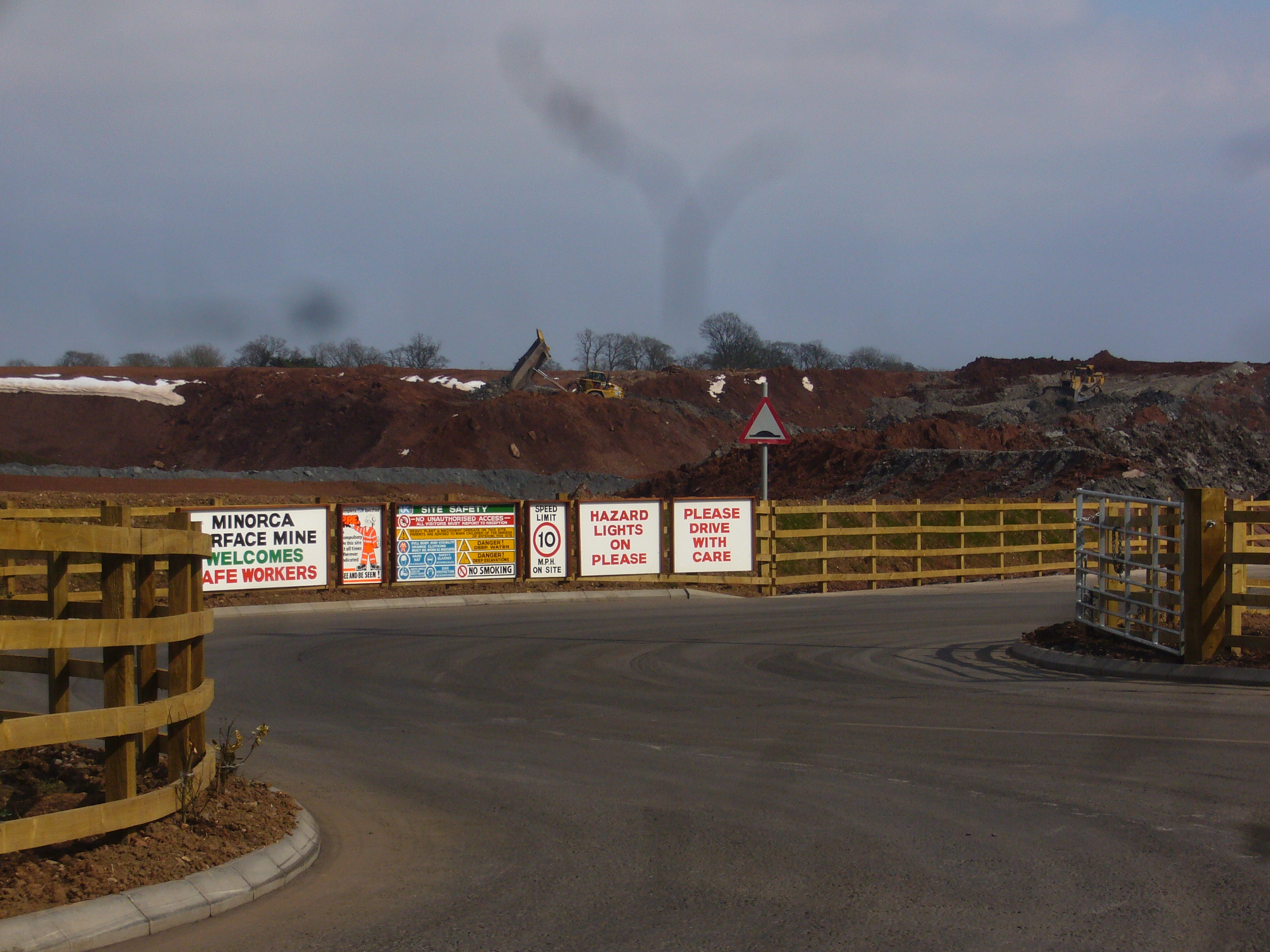
Minorca open cast coal mine entrance in 2013

== Sport ==
The local football team, Measham Welfare Football Club, fields various teams and offers football to local children of 6–18. The club is based at Measham Leisure Centre.

Measham hosts the National Forest Taekwondo group, which started in 2013 and trains at the Church Hall. It welcomes all practitioners from the age of eight up, and covers training in all areas of this Olympic sport, from self-defence to the traditional patterns.

== Notable residents ==
In birth order:

- Walter Blount, 1st Baron Mountjoy (c. 1416 – 1474), politician, acquired Measham Manor.
- Joseph Wilkes (1733–1805), industrialist and agricultural improver, bought Measham Manor in 1777 and instigated strong local development.
- Maria Jane Jewsbury (1800–1833), a woman of letters, was born in Measham, as was her novelist sister Geraldine Jewsbury (1812–1880).
- Charles Lloyd (1835–1908), a Nottingham-based pipe-organ builder, was born in Measham.
- Harry German (1865–1935), a first-class cricketer with Leicestershire, was born in Measham.
- Sir Frank Watson Dyson (1868–1939), Astronomer Royal noted for work on solar eclipses, was born in Measham.
- John Compton (1876–1957), a pipe-organ builder apprenticed to Charles Lloyd, was born in Newton Burgoland, near Measham.
- Arthur Samson (1898 – post-1922), professional football goalkeeper with Birmingham City F.C., was born in Measham.
- Cyril Trigg (1917–1993), Measham born, was also with Birmingham City and other teams.
- Steve Yates (born 1953), Measham born, became a Southend United F.C. professional, having begun his career with Measham Town F.C.
