= Measham (disambiguation) =

Measham is a large village in Leicestershire, England.

Measham may also refer to:

- Measham railway station, a former station in the English village
- David Measham (1937–2005), conductor and violinist
- Ian Measham (born 1964), English footballer
