= Stoke Golding railway station =

Former railway station in Leicestershire, England

Stoke Golding

General information
- Location: Stoke Golding, Hinckley and Bosworth; England
- Coordinates: 52.5717°N 1.4243°W
- Platforms: 2

Other information
- Status: Disused

History
- Original company: Ashby and Nuneaton Joint Railway
- Pre-grouping: Ashby and Nuneaton Joint Railway
- Post-grouping: London Midland and Scottish Railway

Key dates
- 18 August 1873: Station opened to goods
- 1 September 1873: Station opened to passengers
- 13 April 1931: Station closed to passengers
- 1962: Line closed to traffic
Location

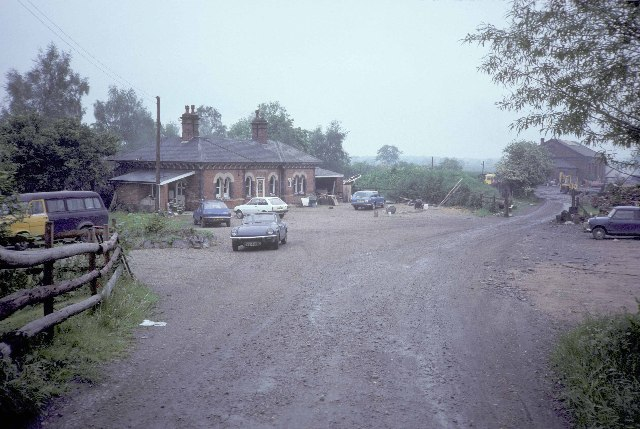
Stoke Golding station in 1985

Stoke Golding railway station is a disused railway station on the former Ashby and Nuneaton Joint Railway. It served the village of Stoke Golding. It closed in 1931 to passengers but closed to parcel traffic in 1951. Goods continued to pass through until 1962 when the line was closed from Shenton to Stoke Golding. The site is now a private residence and the goods yard is now an industrial estate.

Preceding station	Disused railways	Following station
Shenton; Line closed, station open	Midland Railway, London and North Western Railway; Ashby and Nuneaton Joint Railway	Higham on the Hill; Line and station closed
