= Humberstone Road railway station =

Former railway station in Leicestershire, England

Coordinates: 52.6406°N 1.1140°W

Humberstone Road
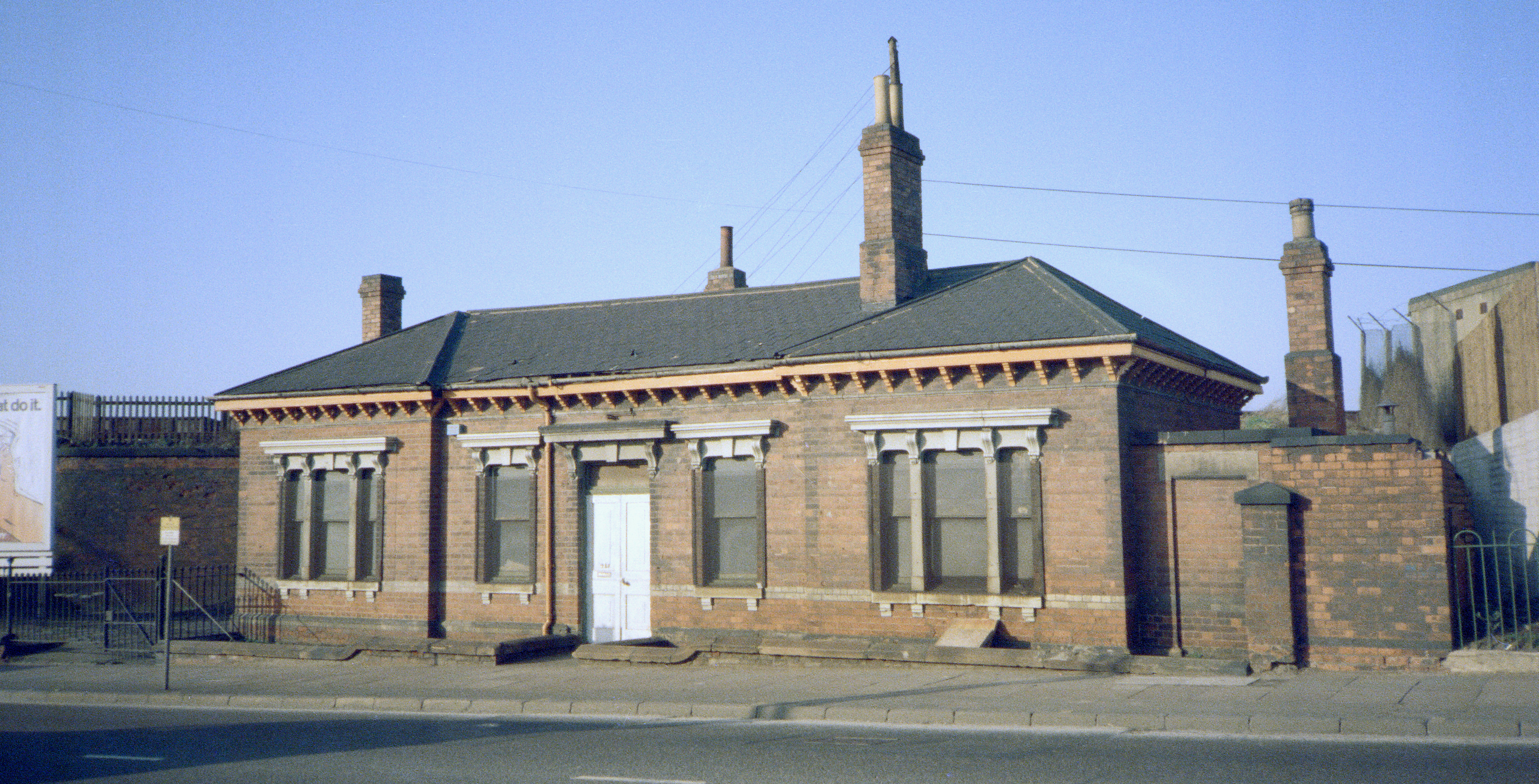
- Leicester Humberstone Road station building in 1984 before being taken apart and rebuilt at Shenton

General information
- Location: Leicester, City of Leicester; England
- Grid reference: SK6005105130
- Platforms: 2

Other information
- Status: Disused

History
- Pre-grouping: Midland Railway
- Post-grouping: London, Midland and Scottish Railway; London Midland Region of British Railways

Key dates
- 1875: Opened
- 1968: Closed
Location

Humberstone Road station was a station to the north of Leicester, England, which opened in 1875 and closed in 1968.

The line was originally opened by the Midland Counties Railway, which merged with the North Midland Railway and the Birmingham and Derby Junction Railway to form the Midland Railway, which opened Humberstone Road station.

The small village of Humberstone, situated some two miles further north-eastwards, was noted for its alabaster mine, but Humberstone Road station, alongside what is now the A47, served the rapidly expanding northern side of Leicester. Although the line is still a major route (the present-day Midland Main Line), there is now very little trace of the station.

The station building lay derelict for many years following the station's closure. As a Grade II listed building it had to be preserved, but British Rail did not have sufficient funds for such an operation. Eventually the building was sold to Leicestershire County Council for £1 plus VAT. It was moved brick by brick to its new home at Shenton station on the Battlefield Line Railway, where it would serve as an information point for Bosworth Battlefield and a southern terminus building for the railway.

The next station northwards was at Syston, between Leicester and Loughborough. A short distance away was the similarly named Humberstone railway station, which was on the Great Northern Railway's Leicester branch.

Former Services

Preceding station	Disused railways	Following station
Leicester London Road	Midland Railway; Midland Main Line; Leicester to Peterborough	Syston

The former Humberstone Road station building, now rebuilt at Shenton
