= Heather and Ibstock railway station =

Former railway station in Leicestershire, England

Coordinates: 52.6923°N 1.4152°W

Heather and Ibstock
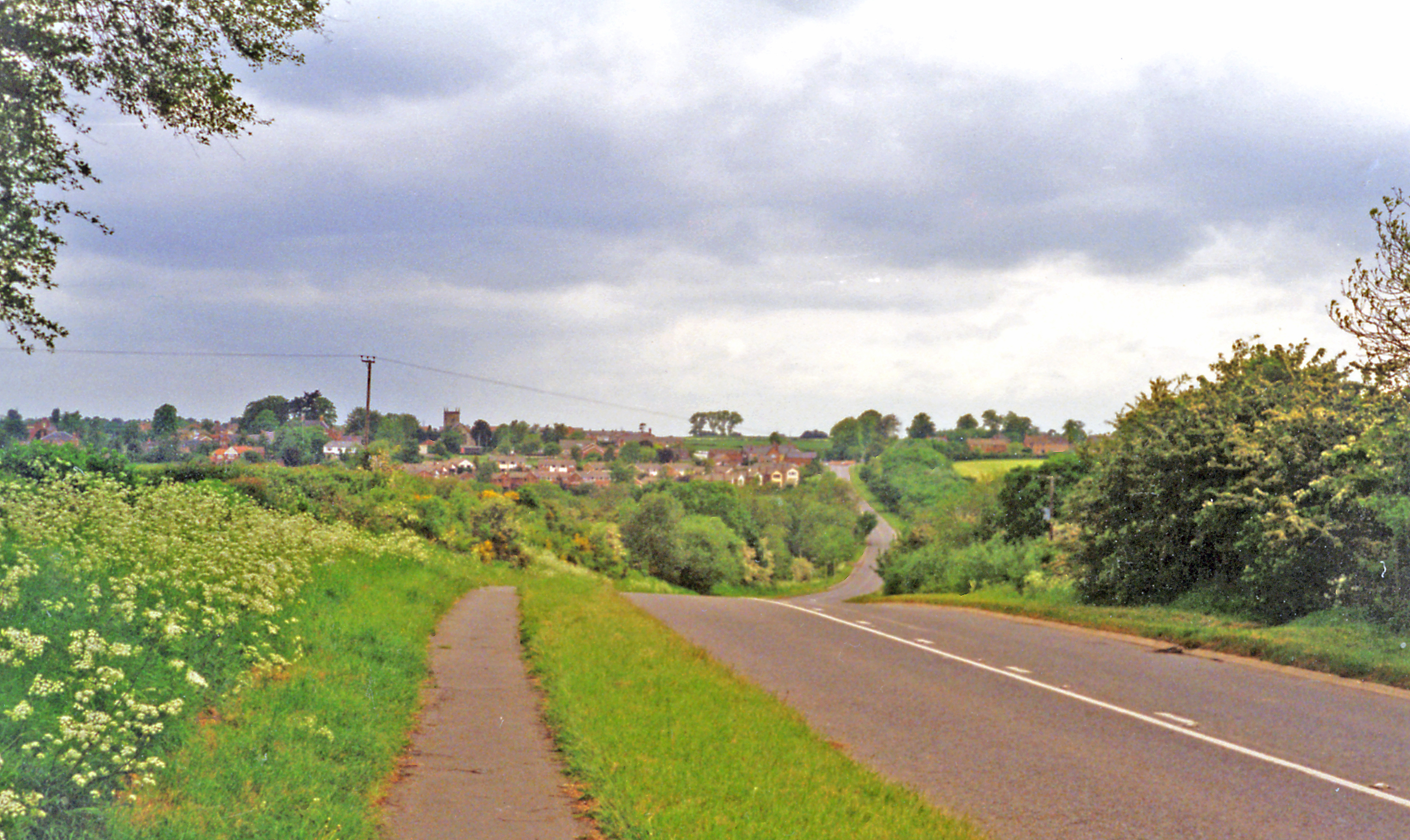
- Site of Heather and Ibstock station

General information
- Location: Heather, North West Leicestershire; England
- Platforms: 2

Other information
- Status: Disused

History
- Original company: Ashby and Nuneaton Joint Railway
- Pre-grouping: Ashby and Nuneaton Joint Railway
- Post-grouping: London Midland and Scottish Railway

Key dates
- 18 August 1873 - 1 September 1873: Station opened to goods - passengers
- 13 April 1931: Station closed to passengers
- 6 July 1954: Line closed to traffic
Location

Heather and Ibstock railway station was a railway station on the Ashby and Nuneaton Joint Railway. It once served both the village of Heather and the town of Ibstock. It was originally named Heather, but with the industrial expansion of nearby Ibstock the request to have it renamed to include that town was accepted in 1894. It closed to passengers in 1931 and 20 years later to closed to parcel traffic in 1951, Goods continued to pass through until 1954 when the line from Hugglescote to Shackerstone closed. The site has since been demolished and is now part of a housing estate which now occupies the entire former station site.

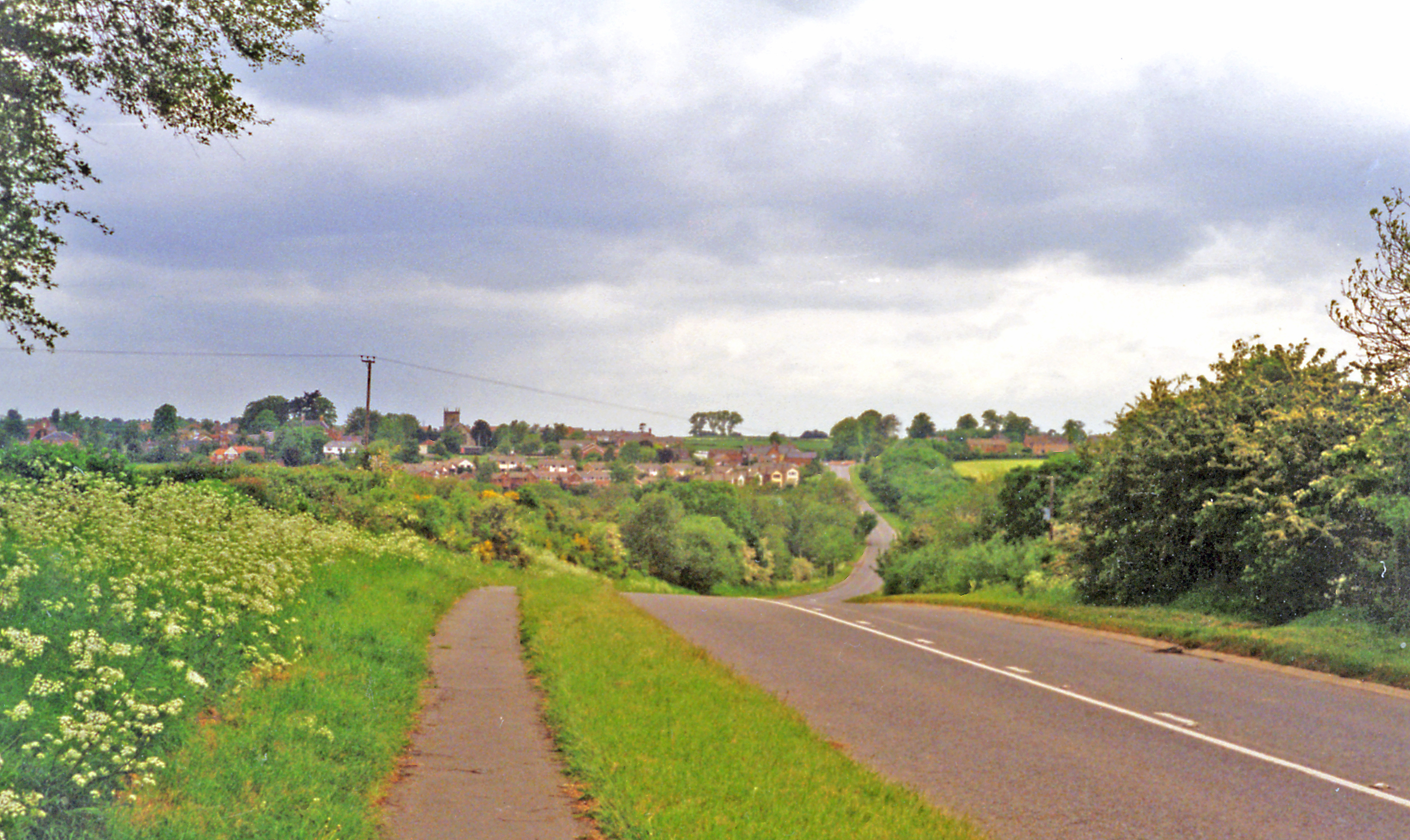

Preceding station	Disused railways	Following station
Hugglescote; Line and station closed	Midland Railway, London and North Western Railway; Ashby and Nuneaton Joint Railway	Shackerstone; Line closed, station open
