= Ibstock =

Village in Leicestershire, England

Coordinates: 52.687°N 1.401°W

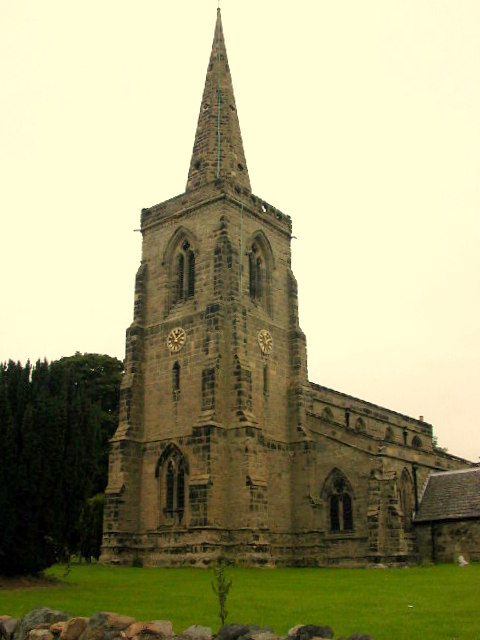
- St Denys’ Church, Ibstock

- Location within Leicestershire
- Population: 5,760 (2001 Census)
- OS grid reference: SK4010
- Civil parish: Ibstock
- District: North West Leicestershire
- Shire county: Leicestershire
- Region: East Midlands
- Country: England
- Sovereign state: United Kingdom
- Post town: IBSTOCK
- Postcode district: LE67
- Dialling code: 01530
- Police: Leicestershire
- Fire: Leicestershire
- Ambulance: East Midlands
- UK Parliament: North West Leicestershire
- Website: Ibstock Parish Council

Ibstock is a former coal mining village and civil parish in North West Leicestershire, England. The population of the civil parish was 5,760 at the 2001 census increasing to 6,201 at the 2011 census and 7,615 at the 2021 census.

The village is on the A447 road between Coalville and Hinckley.

The toponym Ibstock could be a derivative of Ibestoche meaning the farmstead or hamlet of Ibba, which is an Old English personal name also found in other toponyms.

== Manor ==
The Domesday Book of 1086 records Ibstock as a hamlet with six ploughlands. In the first half of the 14th century, and probably before, the Lord of the Manor was Robert Garshull, whose daughter and heiress Elizabeth carried it to her marriage with Robert Burdett, Lord of the Manor of Huncote, Leicestershire. He was still living in 1347. Early in the 15th century Elizabeth, daughter and heiress of John Burdett of Huncote, carried the manor of Ibstock in her marriage to Sir Humphrey Stafford (1384–1419) Lord of Grafton, Worcestershire. Two hundred years later the Staffords were still in possession when Sir William Stafford of Blatherwycke in Northamptonshire is recorded as Lord of the manor of Ibstock.

The parish, along with a grange held by the Cistercian Garendon Abbey, had a long early association with the Burtons of Bourton-on-Dunsmore in Warwickshire.

== Parish church ==
The Church of England parish church of Saint Denys was built entirely in the early 14th century. It is a Decorated Gothic building with a west tower and recessed spire. The nave has two aisles; the north with conventional octagonal piers but the south with less usual hexagonal ones. The rectory is Georgian and has a porch with four Tuscan columns.

William Laud, later Archbishop of Canterbury, supporter of the divine right of kings and author of the Laudian reforms, held the living here 1617–26. At the outbreak of the English Civil War in 1642, John Lufton, then Rector of Ibstock, was accused in the House of Commons of interrupting the execution of the militia ordinance. His living was sequestrated by the County Committee in August 1646.

The parish of Ibstock formerly included the dependent chapelries of Donington le Heath and Hugglescote but the increase of population led to the establishment of a separate ecclesiastical parish in the 19th century.

== Landmarks ==
- Sence Valley Forest Park
- Ibstock Community College

== Economic and social history ==
Ralph Josselin, the noted clerical diarist and incumbent of a parish in Essex, briefly stayed in Ibstock during the English Civil War. On 17 September 1645 he marched from Leicester with the parliamentary army and quartered at Ibstock, noting that it had been "Laud's living, and now Dr Lovedyn a great Cavailier" and that although his diet was "very good" his lodgings were "indifferent". Josselin was alarmed to discover on his return the next day that a man had been killed just outside his lodgings near where he had stood closely a while before "not knowing of the pardue [sic] in the ditch".

In 1774, the town was enclosed and in 1792 a free school for fifty poor children of the parish was founded. The 1801 Census gives a total population of 763, in 152 families, two-thirds engaged in agriculture, the rest in trade and manufacturing. By 1811 the population had increased to 836.

Ibstock is a former coal mining town and also has historical and current manufacturing plants that produce tiles, bricks, boots and shoes, and light engineering.

In the 19th century a branch of the Ashby and Nuneaton Joint Railway was built through the village and nearby village of Heather. Heather and Ibstock railway station was opened with passenger services ending in 1931. The line through to Coalville East closing completely in 1964, prior to the publication of the Reshaping of British Railways report. The station master's house on Station Road survives.

== Media ==
Television signals can only be received from the Sutton Coldfield transmitting station which broadcasts programmes from Birmingham. However, BBC East Midlands and ITV Central are also received through cable and satellite television such as Freesat and Sky.

Local radio stations are BBC Radio Leicester, Smooth East Midlands, Capital Midlands, Hits Radio East Midlands, Greatest Hits Radio Midlands, and Hermitage FM, a community based station.

Local newspaper is served by the Leicester Mercury, the town also has its owned independently local community magazine called Ibstock Life.

== Notable people ==
- William Laud (1573–1645). Archbishop of Canterbury and adviser to Charles I
- Elizabeth Ridgeway (died 1684). Serial killer, lived in Ibstock
- Spencer Madan (1729–1813). Bishop of Bristol, Bishop of Peterborough
- Bernard Newman (1897–1968). Author
- Ken Burditt (1906–1977). Footballer, Norwich City, Millwall, Leicester
- Jack "Red" Beattie (1907–1990). Ibstock-born, Canadian-raised professional ice hockey player in the National Hockey League, Boston Bruins, Detroit Red Wings, and New York Americans
- Horace Greasley (1918–2010). British prisoner of war who later gained fame for escaping from his POW camp over 200 times, and returning into captivity each time.
- Dorian West (born 1967). Rugby footballer, Rugby World Cup winner
- Felix Buxton (born 1970). Musician, Basement Jaxx
- Stephen Graham (born 1973). Actor, lived in Ibstock
- Andrew Betts (born 1977). Great Britain basketball player
- Sam Bowen. Boxer, former British Super Featherweight Champion

== Sources and further reading ==
- Curtis, John (1831). A Topographical History of the County of Leicester. Ashby-de-la-Zouch: W. Hextall. pp. 80–81.
- Hoskins, W.G. (ed.); McKinley, R.A. (1951). A History of the County of Leicestershire, Volume 2. Victoria County History. pp. 5–7.
- Lewis, Samuel, ed. (1931) [1848]. A Topographical Dictionary of England (Seventh ed.). London: Samuel Lewis. pp. 600–603.
- Pevsner, Nikolaus (1960). Leicestershire and Rutland. The Buildings of England. Harmondsworth: Penguin Books. p. 125.
- Stephen Graham OBE Who is Stephen Graham, Hollywood star who lives in Leicestershire village - Leicestershire Live (leicestermercury.co.uk)
