= Measham railway station =

Former railway station in Leicestershire, England

Measham
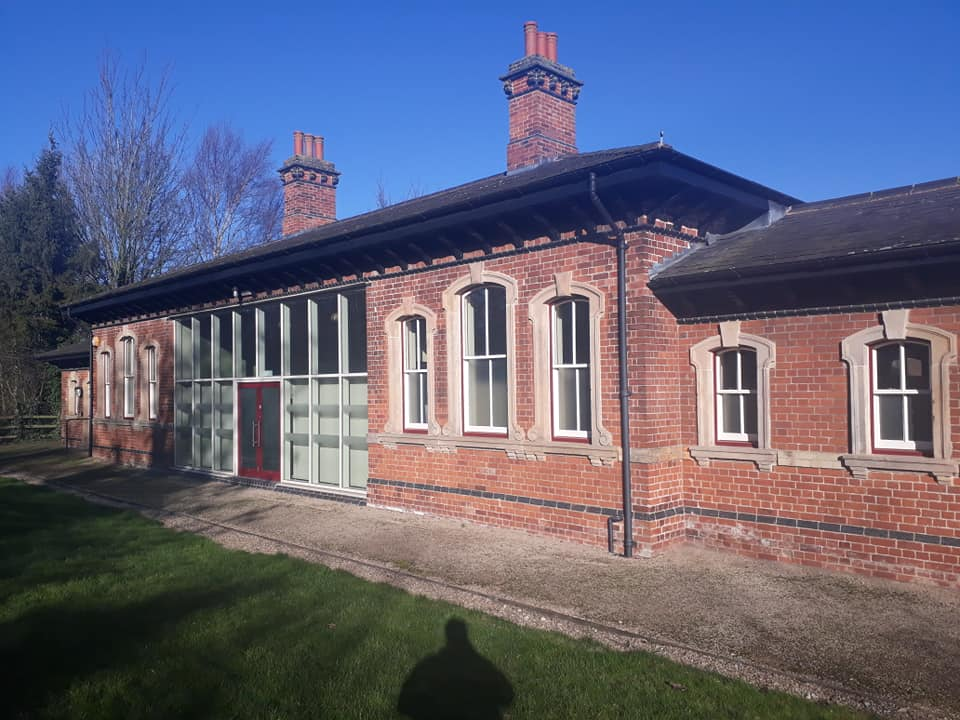
- Measham station in 2018

General information
- Location: Measham, North West Leicestershire; England
- Coordinates: 52.7033°N 1.5085°W
- Platforms: 2

Other information
- Status: Disused

History
- Original company: Ashby and Nuneaton Joint Railway
- Pre-grouping: Ashby and Nuneaton Joint Railway
- Post-grouping: London Midland and Scottish Railway

Key dates
- 1 Sept. 1873: Station opened
- 13 April 1931: Station closed to passengers
- 6 July 1964: Station closed to goods
- 20 June 1981: Branch to Donisthorpe Colliery closed.
Location

Measham railway station is a disused railway station that formerly served the village of Measham, North West Leicestershire from 1873 to 1931. The station was on the Ashby and Nuneaton Joint Railway.

The station is the only building on the Ashby - Shackerstone section to still be in situ. The trackbed has since been filled in and is now a footpath to Moira. The goods shed is also still standing at Measham. The station building now houses the Measham Museum.

| Preceding station | Disused railways | Following station |
|---|---|---|
| Donisthorpe; Line and station closed | Midland Railway, London and North Western Railway; Ashby and Nuneaton Joint Railway | Snarestone; Line and station closed |

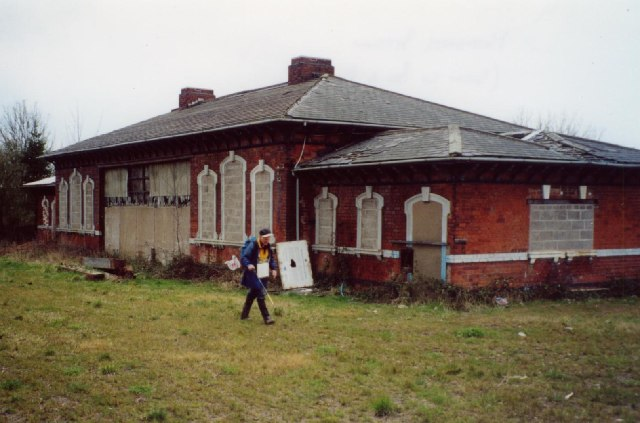
The station building in 2002, before renovation
