= Snarestone railway station =

Former railway station in Leicestershire, England

Snarestone
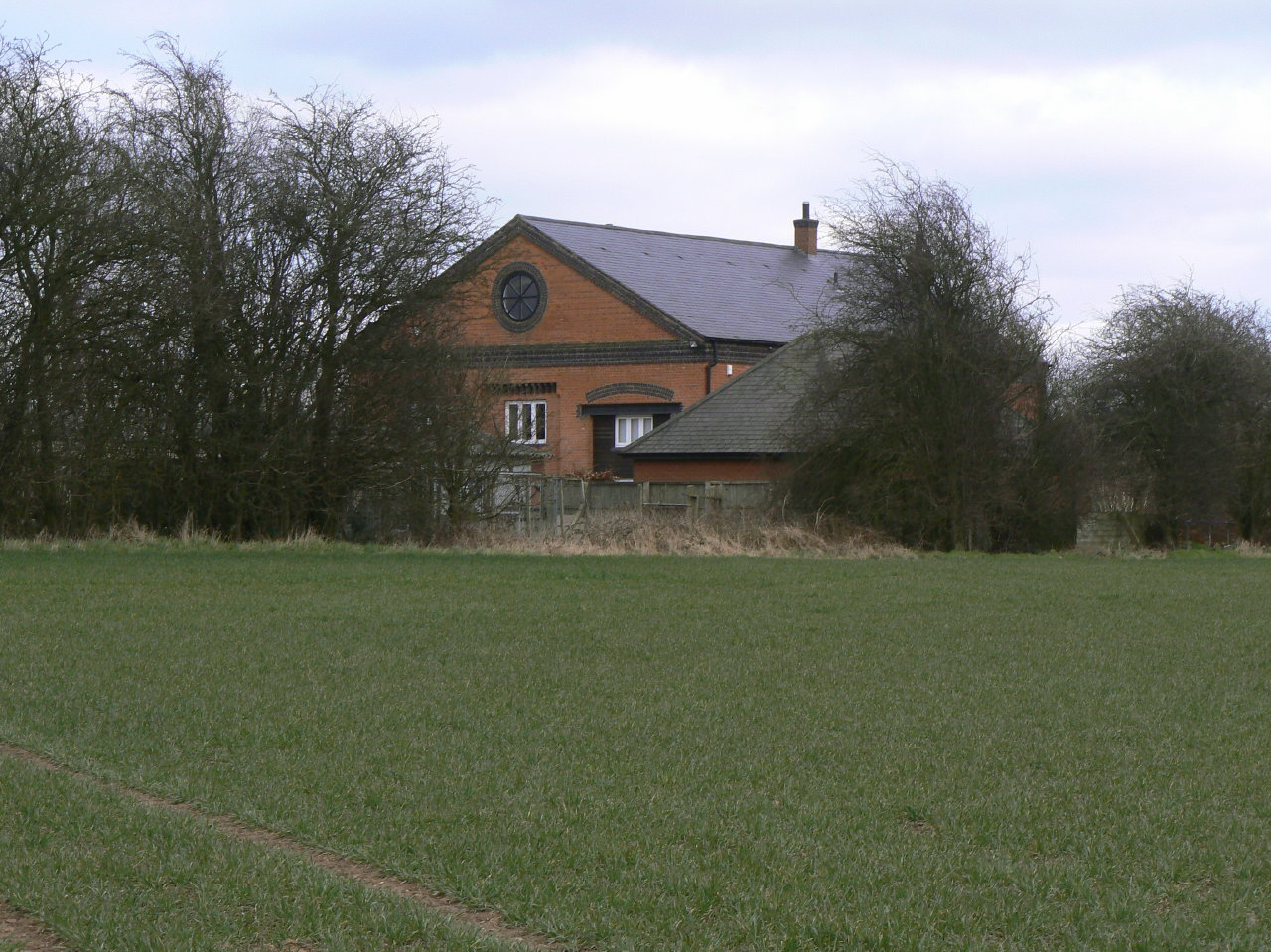
- Former engine shed at Snarestone station site, now a private residence.

General information
- Location: Snarestone, North West Leicestershire; England
- Coordinates: 52.6793°N 1.4984°W
- Platforms: 2

Other information
- Status: Disused

History
- Original company: Ashby and Nuneaton Joint Railway
- Pre-grouping: Ashby and Nuneaton Joint Railway
- Post-grouping: London Midland and Scottish Railway

Key dates
- 1 Sept 1873: Station opened
- 13 April 1931: Station closed to passengers
- 7 August 1967: Station closed to goods
Location

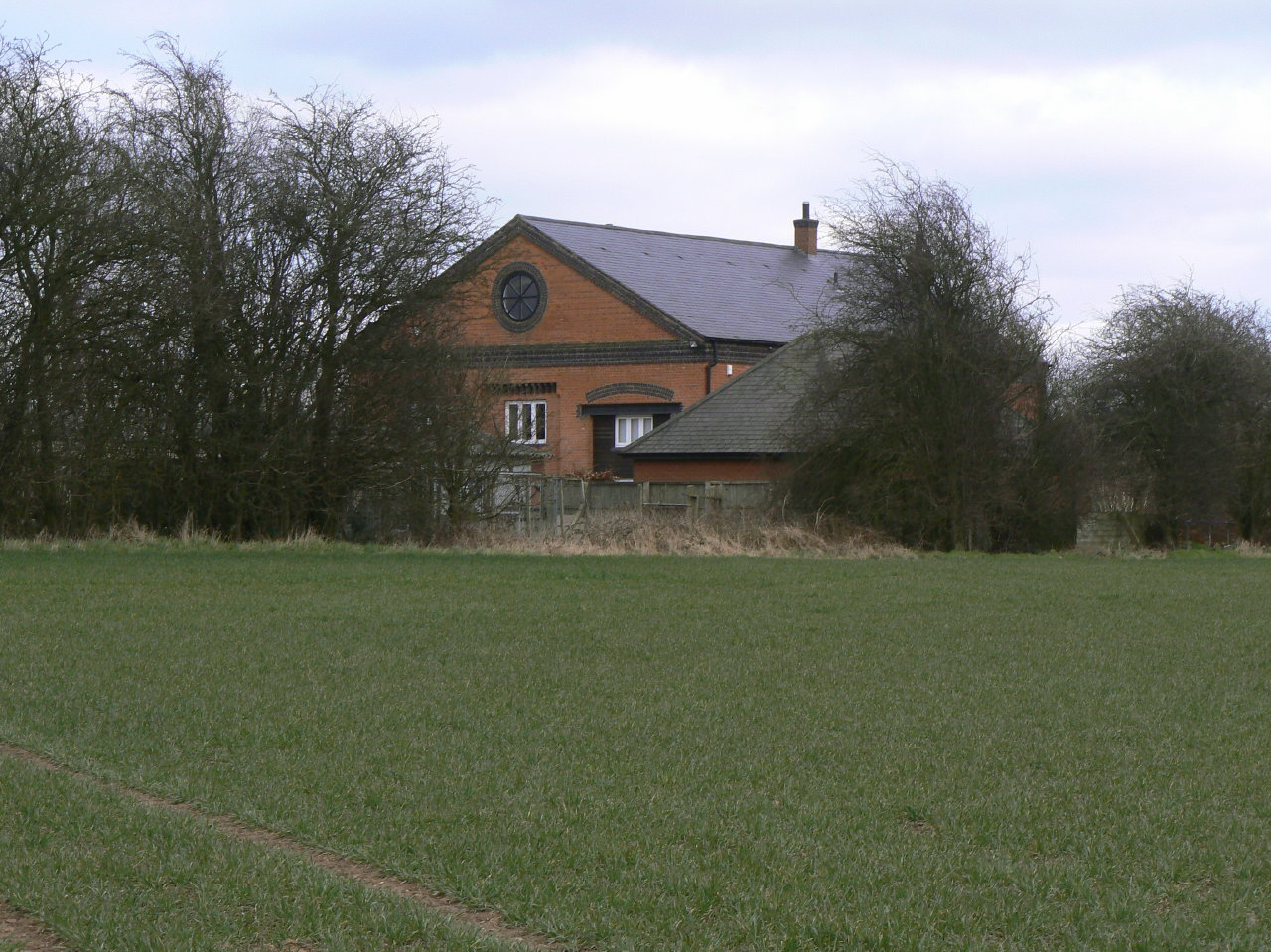

Snarestone railway station is a disused railway station that formerly served the village of Snarestone, North West Leicestershire from 1873 to 1931. The station was on the Ashby and Nuneaton Joint Railway. The station building has since been demolished but the station master's house and goods shed survive as private dwellings. Platforms are also evident but inaccessible.

| Preceding station | Disused railways | Following station |
|---|---|---|
| Measham; Line and station closed | Midland Railway, London and North Western Railway; Ashby and Nuneaton Joint Railway | Shackerstone; Line closed, station open |
