= Horace Greasley =

British Army soldier

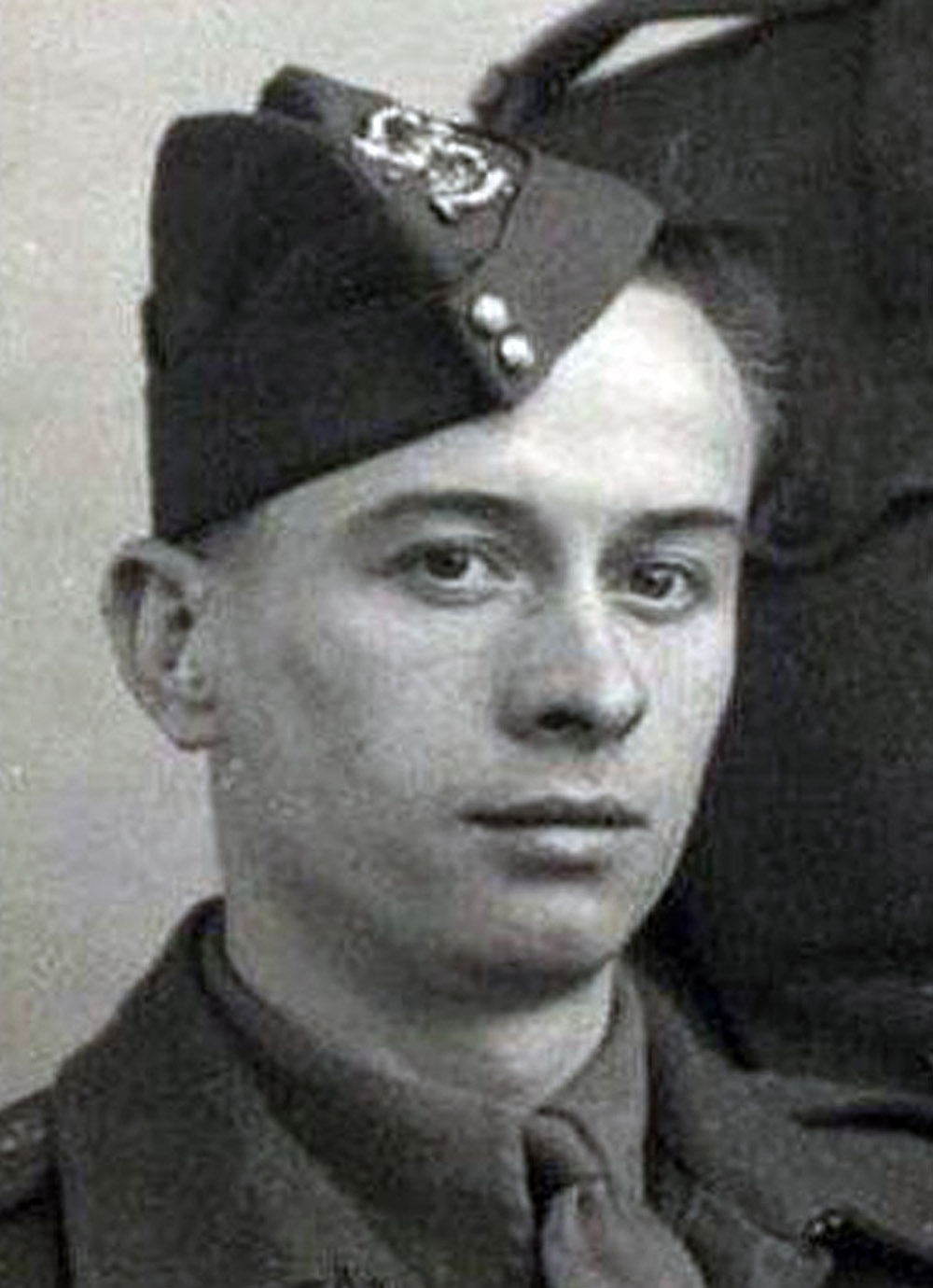
- Born: 25 December 1918; Ibstock, Leicestershire
- Died: 4 February 2010 (aged 91); L'Alfàs del Pi, Alicante, Spain- Costa Blanca
- Known for: Claims to have escaped and returned to his POW camp over 200 times to meet with his love interest
- Spouse(s): Kathleen (????-????) divorced Brenda Greasley (1975–2010) His death
- Children: 2

Joseph Horace Greasley (25 December 1918 – 4 February 2010) was a British soldier in the Second World War who was captured in May 1940 by the German Wehrmacht and later became famous for claiming that he escaped from his camp over 200 times in the conduct of a clandestine love affair, returning into captivity each time. He was the subject of a best-selling autobiography. He was also the subject of controversy for having claimed that he was the prisoner of war shown in a photograph staring at Heinrich Himmler, when the prisoner in question is identified elsewhere as a Soviet soldier.

== Autobiography ==
In early 2008, ghostwriter Ken Scott was introduced to Greasley, aged 89, so he could finally have his World War II memoirs recorded. Scott stated that he only acted as Greasley's fingers to type the book as Greasley suffered from extreme arthritis. The book was finished and published by the end of 2008 by Libros International, and gives Greasley's account of his decision to go to war, his capture, struggles, near-death experiences, brutality of the SS, the unique love of Rosa Rauchbach, the escapes, and his liberation. Authors Guy Walters and Adrian Weale have questioned the authenticity of some of the events recounted in the autobiography.

== Himmler photograph ==
The February 2010 Telegraph obituary published a photograph captioned "Greasley confronting Heinrich Himmler (wearing the spectacles) in the POW camp". The photograph and its description was republished by other news sources. Guy Walters asserted categorically that the soldier in the picture was not Greasley, stating that the picture is held by the US National Archives and the caption details show it was taken in Minsk (in Nazi-occupied Belarus) in mid-1941, that it was taken by a photographer for a propaganda film and identifies the soldier as a Soviet from his cap, and that the officers in the picture are the same officers who appear in the film with Himmler.
