= Harry German =

English cricketer

Personal information
- Full name: Harry German
- Born: 1 November 1865; Measham, Leicestershire, England
- Died: 14 June 1945 (aged 79); Charing Cross, London, England
- Batting: Right-handed
- Role: Occasional wicket-keeper
- Relatives: Arthur German (nephew)

Domestic team information
- Years: Team
- 1896–1898: Leicestershire

Career statistics
Competition	First-class
Matches	5
Runs scored	69
Batting average	7.66
100s/50s	–/–
Top score	13
Balls bowled	–
Wickets	–
Bowling average	–
5 wickets in innings	–
10 wickets in match	–
Best bowling	–
Catches/stumpings	–/–
- Source: Cricinfo, 14 January 2012

Harry German (1 November 1865 – 14 June 1945) was an English cricketer. German was a right-handed batsman who occasionally fielded as a wicket-keeper. He was born at Measham, Leicestershire.

German made his first-class debut for Leicestershire against Essex in the 1896 County Championship. He made four further first-class appearances for Leicestershire, the last of which came against Middlesex in the 1898 County Championship. In his five first-class matches, he scored a total of 69 runs at an average of 7.66, with a high score of 13.

He died at Charing Cross, London on 14 June 1945. His nephew, Arthur German, also played first-class cricket for Leicestershire.
