= Arthur German =

English cricketer (1905–1968)

Personal information
- Full name: Arthur German
- Born: 28 June 1905; Ashby-de-la-Zouch, Leicestershire, England
- Died: 2 February 1968 (aged 62); Aberdeen, Aberdeenshire, Scotland
- Batting: Right-handed
- Relatives: Harry German (uncle)

Domestic team information
- Years: Team
- 1923–1924: Leicestershire

Career statistics
Competition	First-class
Matches	3
Runs scored	73
Batting average	12.16
100s/50s	–/–
Top score	36
Balls bowled	–
Wickets	–
Bowling average	–
5 wickets in innings	–
10 wickets in match	–
Best bowling	–
Catches/stumpings	2/–
- Source: Cricinfo, 14 January 2012

Arthur German (28 June 1905 – 2 February 1968) was an English cricketer. German was a right-handed batsman. He was born at Ashby-de-la-Zouch, Leicestershire, and was educated at Repton School.

German made his first-class debut for Leicestershire against Sussex at the County Ground, Hove, in the 1923 County Championship. He made two further first-class appearances for Leicestershire the following season, against Surrey at The Oval, and Essex at Aylestone Road, Leicester. In his three first-class matches, he scored a total of 73 runs at an average of 12.16, with a high score of 36.

He died at Aberdeen, Scotland on 2 February 1968. His uncle, Harry German, also played first-class cricket for Leicestershire.
