= Joseph Wilkes =

English industrialist and agricultural improver

- Spouse(s): Elizabeth Wood
- Parent(s): Joseph Wilkes (farmer)

Joseph Wilkes (1733–1805) was an 18th-century English industrialist and agricultural improver born in the village of Overseal in Derbyshire but more commonly associated with the village of Measham in Leicestershire.

From a farming family, Wilkes was one of the leading businessmen in the area during the early part of the Industrial Revolution in England.

== Career ==
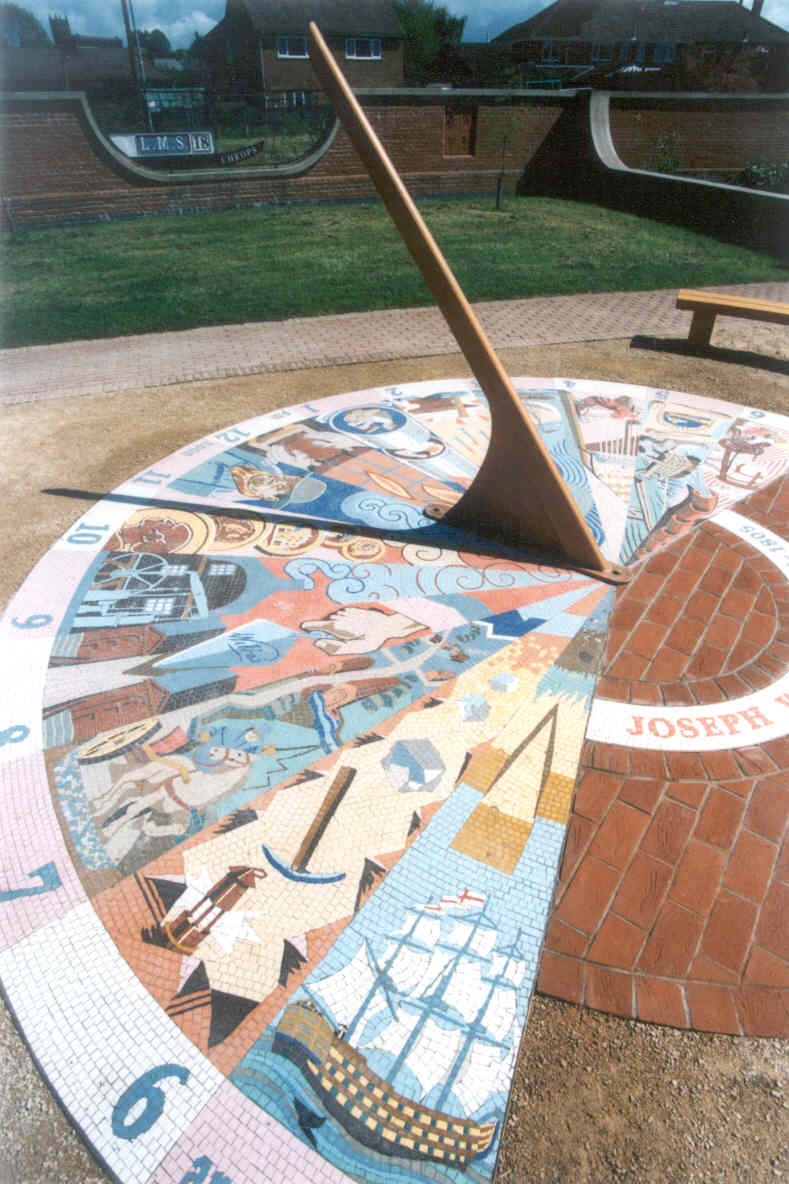
Sundial by Steve Field

Joseph Wilkes' business enterprises were many and varied, and during his lifetime he transformed Measham from a tiny mining village to a model settlement of the Industrial Revolution. Purchasing the manor with his brothers from William Wollaston in 1777 for £56,000, he undertook the development and expansion of the village, opening a bank, an inn, building factories, a boat yard, a market house and a vicarage, and constructing affordable housing for his workers. Many signs of this development are still visible today.

To commemorate Wilkes, a mosaic sundial displaying many of his enterprises, by the artist Steve Field, has been constructed near Wilkes Avenue in Measham.

=== Coal mining ===
One aspect of this industrial development was the mining of hard-crude-coal, that important mineral which was to fuel the furnaces of the Industrial revolution sweeping the nation at that time. In 1767 Wilkes leased the rights from William Wollaston to mine coal in Measham area, he later went on to own collieries in Measham, Oakthorpe, Donisthorpe, Moira and Brinsley in Nottinghamshire.

Wilkes sunk many new pits, employing Newcomen engines to pump water from their works which allowed coal to be mined at much greater depths. He also went on to employ steam winding gear at his Oakthorpe colliery which allowed men to be transported down, and coal to be brought up from the coalface more efficiently. To connect these collieries to the wider markets made available by the canals, Wilkes laid down horse-drawn iron tramways which made the movement of heavy loads of coal overland far more cost effective.

=== Textiles ===
In the area of textiles Wilkes collaborated with at one time, Sir Robert Peel in building cotton mills in Tamworth and Fazeley. He also leased and improved a bleach mill on the river Mease in 1774 and constructed huge cotton and carding mills in Measham and Ashby de la Zouch, harnessing water wheels and the latest Boulton and Watt steam engines to drive their apparatus. He also initiated local cottage industries, building many weaving shops in Measham and Appleby Magna.

=== Transport ===
In an effort to improve the transport links and open up the area to distant markets, he was active in building a coaching inn and turnpike roads in and around Measham, These he built along his own design, using a 'concave surface' which was more durable and easier to maintain.

He was also active in developing other transport networks, water transport being the most cost effective means of bulk shipment in those days, he was a member of a consortium calling itself the "Burton Boat Company" which leased the rights to make the River Trent navigable to barges in 1762. In the latter part of his life he was a promoter, and at one time treasurer, of the Ashby-de-la-Zouch Canal. Obviously well aware of the economic benefits the canal would bring to the district, Wilkes pushed local landowners such as the Earl of Moira to expedite its completion and was also to supply bricks for its construction. The canal was originally intended to link the Coventry Canal to the River Trent, it was finally completed over budget in 1804 and unfortunately never lived up to expectations.

Wilkes also saw the early potential in another means of transportation which was eventually to supersede the canals, namely, railways. Before the advent of the steam locomotive, horse-drawn carts on iron rails were the most efficient means of moving heavy loads overland. Wilkes promoted the use of these tramways in his article "On the Utility of Iron Rail-Ways"(1800), and in conjunction with Benjamin Outram was to construct iron tramways connecting his collieries to canals.

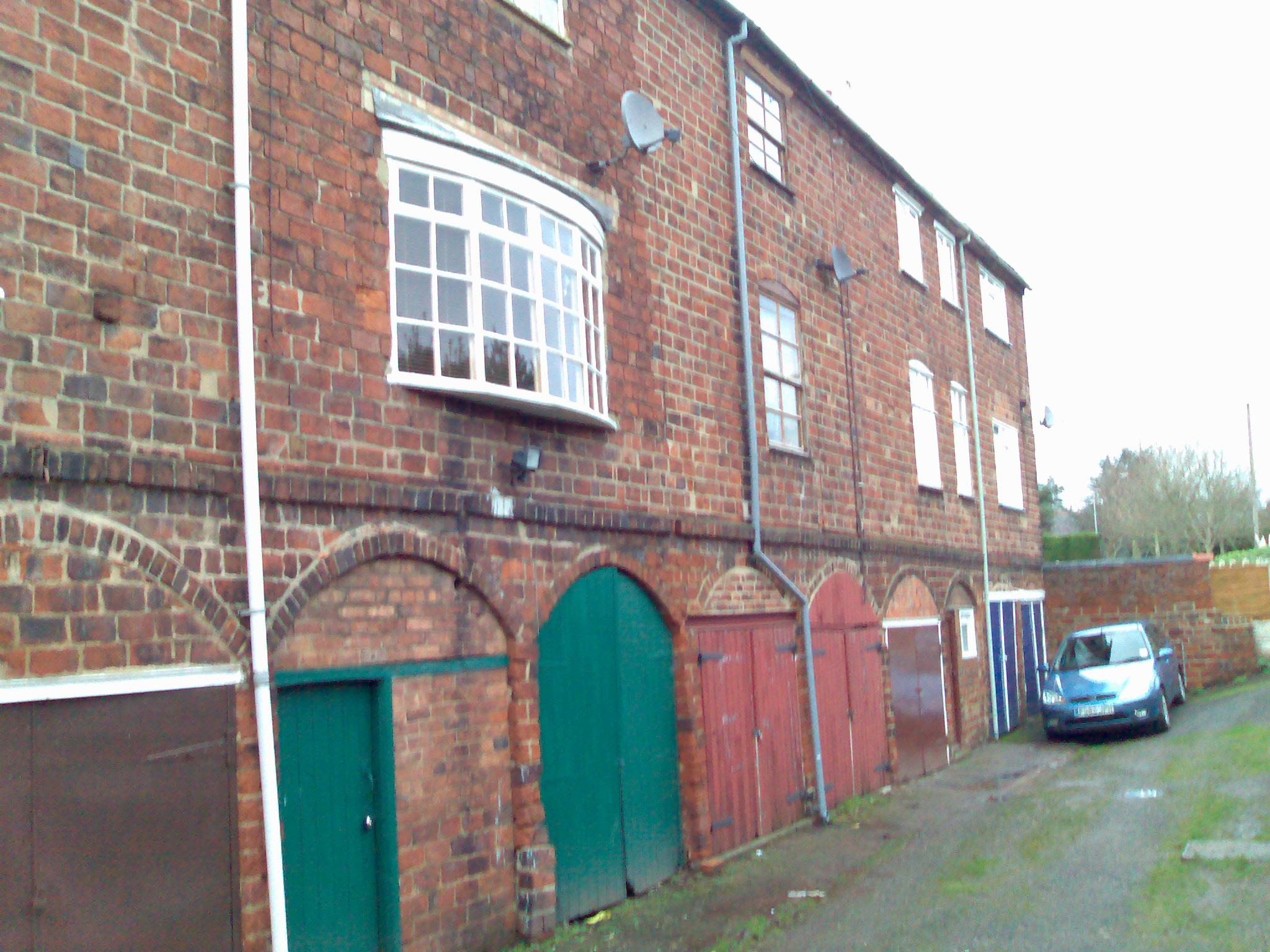
These buildings in Measham are constructed with Joseph Wilkes' double sized 'Jumb' or 'Gob' bricks and were originally part of his brickyard, The ground floor sheds were originally the brick-drying sheds, whilst the upper floors were used as weaving sheds.

=== Brick making ===
Many buildings of Wilkes' empire were built with bricks manufactured by his own brickyard in Measham, including his Jumb or Gob bricks, for which he is well known. These double sized bricks were manufactured between 1784 and 1803 and were intended to lessen the burden of the brick tax, which was levied on every thousand bricks used. A few buildings exhibiting Wilkes' signature recessed arches and his oversized bricks can still be seen in Measham and the surrounding area today.

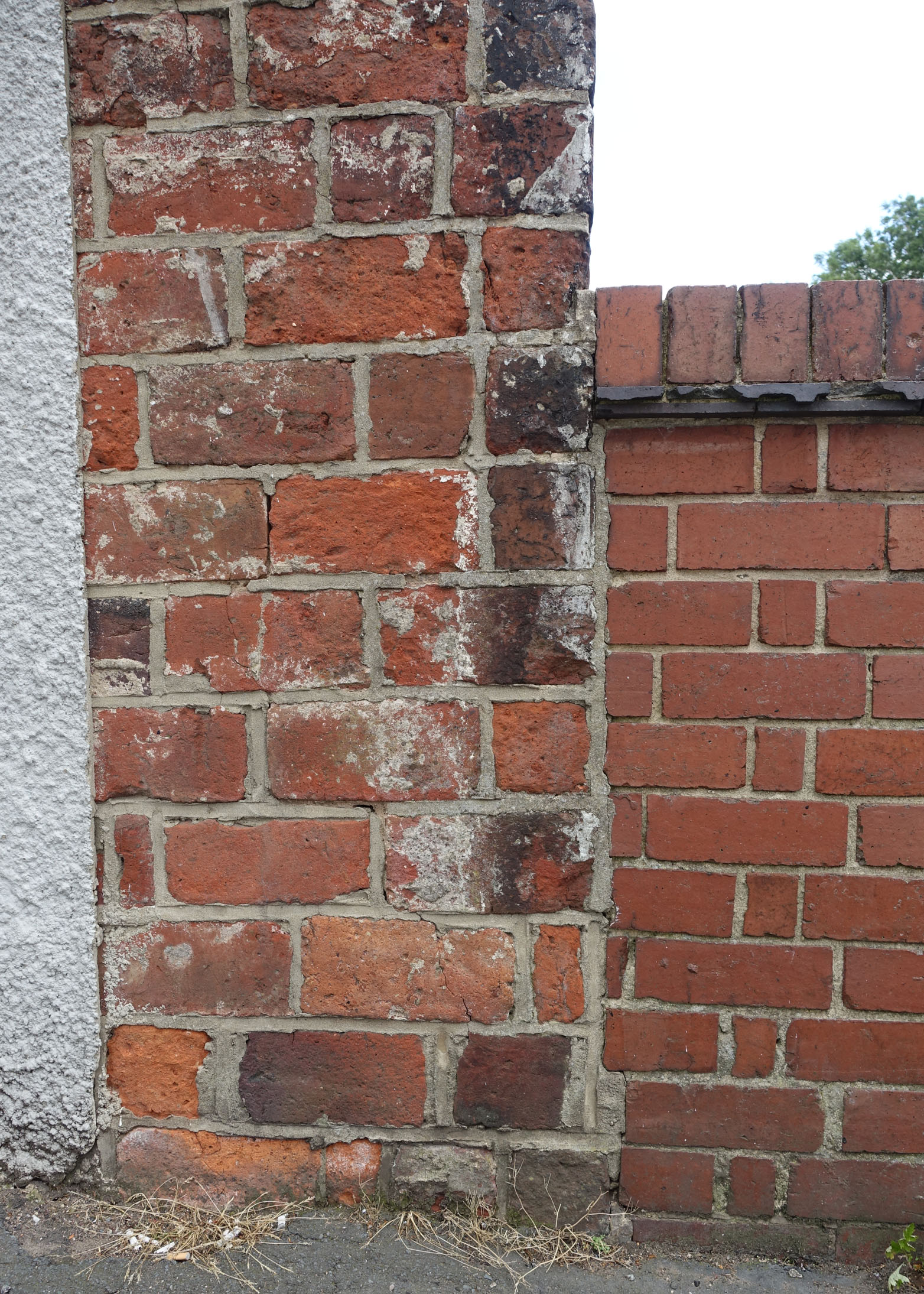
Wilkes Gobs oversize bricks in the wall of former Ashby Canal warehouse alongside modern bricks of bridge parapet, High Street, Measham

=== Agriculture ===
Wilkes was a keen agricultural experimenter and improver and was described by the agricultural writer Arthur Young as "a breeder, and a farmer on no slight scale" and John Farey writing in 1815 lamented "Would that every district in Britain had its Joseph Wilkes! in which case we need not import Corn, even for our increased population, or be half so dependent on foreign nations as we are". Intent on improving the productivity of his farmland and not averse to trying new methods, he experimented with different ways of fertilising his soils, advocating the deep ploughing and burning of the soil, and even experimenting with fertilising his land by throwing over water pumped from his mines. Wilkes also constructed a series of irrigation canals in the area around Measham and was a firm believer in using new farming machinery, such as Cooke's Horse-hoe.

In animal husbandry Wilkes experimented in techniques for storing animals underground, fed from overhead hoppers, he was also interested in the new science of selective breeding, being a member of the Leicestershire tup society, inaugurating the Smithfield Club, and breeding one of Robert Bakewell's celebrated rams.

== Personal life ==
Wilkes was born into a large and moderately well off family in 1733. His father, also named Joseph Wilkes, was a yeoman farmer, and owned a farm in Overseal.

Wilkes married Elizabeth Wood from Burton upon Trent in 1759. Wilkes' married life was relatively short, as his wife Elizabeth died in 1767. Although his only son did not survive past infancy, some of his daughters did grow up and were married; Joyce and Matilda married, respectively, brothers Rev. Thomas Fisher, of Idlicote, Warwickshire, and Rev. John Fisher, lord of the manor and rector of Higham on the Hill. They were sons of Thomas Fisher, of Caldecote Hall, Leicestershire, the Fisher family coming originally from Foremark, Derbyshire. Matilda and John Fisher were great-grandparents of Geoffrey Fisher, Archbishop of Canterbury from 1945 to 1961. Wilkes died in Croydon in 1805 and is buried there.
