= Market Bosworth railway station =

Former railway station in England

Market Bosworth
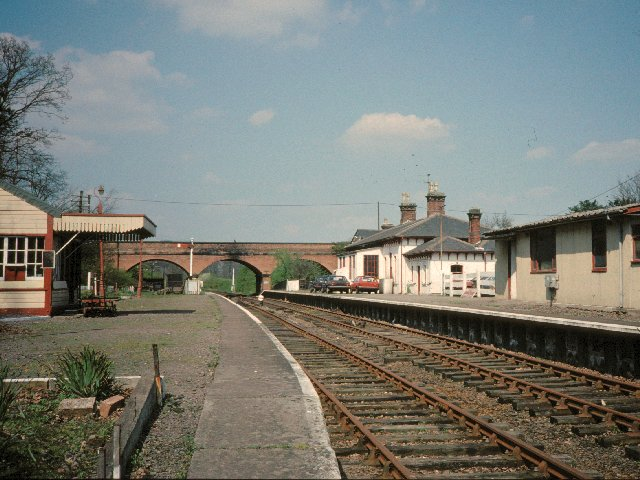

General information
- Location: Market Bosworth, Hinckley and Bosworth; England
- Coordinates: 52°37′28.50″N 1°25′15.50″W
- Grid reference: SK392031
- System: Station on heritage railway
- Manager: Battlefield Line Railway
- Platforms: 2

Key dates
- 18 August 1873: Opened to goods traffic
- 1 September 1873: Opened to passenger traffic
- 13 April 1931: Closed to passenger traffic
- 1954: Closed to all traffic
- 1973: Reopened on the Battlefield Line
Location

Market Bosworth railway station is a heritage railway station serving the town of Market Bosworth in Leicestershire, England. It was originally opened on the London and North Western Railway and the Midland Railway, who jointly operated the line between Moira West Junction and Nuneaton as the Ashby and Nuneaton Joint Railway. The station was designed by the Midland Railway company architect John Holloway Sanders.

Nowadays it is part of the heritage Battlefield Line Railway, some 3 miles (5 km) to the south of the railway's base at Shackerstone.

Original station buildings survive on platform 1, used by the private Station Garage. The track in platform one is a siding, used for the storage of wagons and diesel shunters in various states of disrepair. Platform 2 is on the running line and is the only one in use. The signal box also survives, as do several semaphore signals, though this signalling is not in commission thus the station is an unsignalled halt. The waiting room was originally at Chester Road on the Birmingham Cross-City Line; when this line was electrified between 1991 and 1993, the building was dismantled and reconstructed at Market Bosworth.

Volunteers have been slowly restoring the station. The station encountered severe vandalism at Easter 2008 with one building, the Permanent Way hut, completely destroyed by arson. Any windows that were originally intact in the signalbox were smashed. Nonetheless, the railway continues to restore the station. In May 2009, a passenger train hauled by LNER Thompson Class B1 No. 61306 halted at the station for the first time in at least ten years to allow passengers to see the progress at the station.

On the weekend of 19–20 March 2011, completion of a foot crossing at the south end of the station enabled it to be opened to the public for the first time. There is a car park in the former goods yard but only very basic facilities for passengers.

There is a long-term aspiration to restore the passing loop at the station to allow two train operation over the line.

Preceding station	Heritage railways	Following station
Shackerstone Terminus	Battlefield Line Railway	Shenton Terminus
Disused railways
Shackerstone; Line and station open	Midland Railway, London and North Western Railway; Ashby and Nuneaton Joint Railway	Shenton; Line and station open
