= Ibstock School =

Coordinates: 52.68883°N 1.399°W

Location
- Central Avenue; Ibstock, Leicestershire, LE67 6NE; England

Information
- Type: Academy
- Local authority: Leicestershire
- Trust: LIFE Multi-Academy Trust
- Department for Education URN: 138721 Tables
- Ofsted: Reports
- Head teacher: Sophie Williams
- Gender: Coeducational
- Age range: 11–16
- Website: www.ibstockschool.co.uk

Ibstock School is a coeducational secondary school located in Ibstock in the English county of Leicestershire.

Previously a community middle school administered by Leicestershire County Council, in September 2012 Ibstock School (previously Ibstock Community College until 2024) converted to academy status. The school is now sponsored by the LIFE Multi-Academy Trust. In September 2022 the school expanded its age range to 16, becoming a secondary school.

Ibstock Leisure Complex forms part of the school campus, and is jointly run by the school and North West Leicestershire District Council. The leisure complex offers facilities such as a swimming pool, gym, sports hall, sports pitches, dance studio and meeting rooms. The facilities are open for public use outside of school hours.
