= Arthur Samson =

English footballer

Personal information
- Full name: Ambrose Arthur Samson
- Date of birth: 14 October 1897
- Place of birth: Measham, Leicestershire, England
- Date of death: 1980 (aged 82)
- Place of death: Coalville, Leicestershire, England
- Height: 6 ft 0 in (1.83 m)
- Position: Goalkeeper

Senior career*
Years	Team	Apps	(Gls)
- Measham Town
1922–1923	Birmingham	2	(0)
1923–19??	Burton Town		
- * Club domestic league appearances and goals

Ambrose Arthur Samson (14 October 1897 – 1980) was an English professional footballer who played in the Football League for Birmingham. He played as a goalkeeper.

Samson was born in Measham, Leicestershire, and began his football career with Measham Town before joining Birmingham in 1922. He made his debut in the First Division on 3 March 1923, deputising for Dan Tremelling in a game at Preston North End which Birmingham won 3–2. Tremelling's form restricted Samson to two appearances that season, at the end of which he returned to non-league football with Burton Town.

The 1939 Register lists Samson as living with his wife, Elsie, in Ashby-de-la-Zouch, Leicestershire, and working as a colliery winding engineer. He died in 1980 in Coalville, Leicestershire, at the age of 82.
