= Hugglescote railway station =

Former railway station in Leicestershire, England

Coordinates: 52.705121°N 1.372884°W

Hugglescote

General information
- Location: Hugglescote, North West Leicestershire; England
- Platforms: 2

Other information
- Status: Disused

History
- Original company: Ashby and Nuneaton Joint Railway
- Pre-grouping: Ashby and Nuneaton Joint Railway
- Post-grouping: London Midland and Scottish Railway

Key dates
- 18 August 1873 - 1 September 1873: Opened to goods
- 1 September 1873: Opened to passengers
- 13 April 1931: Station closed to passengers
- 6 July 1965: Line closed to traffic
Location

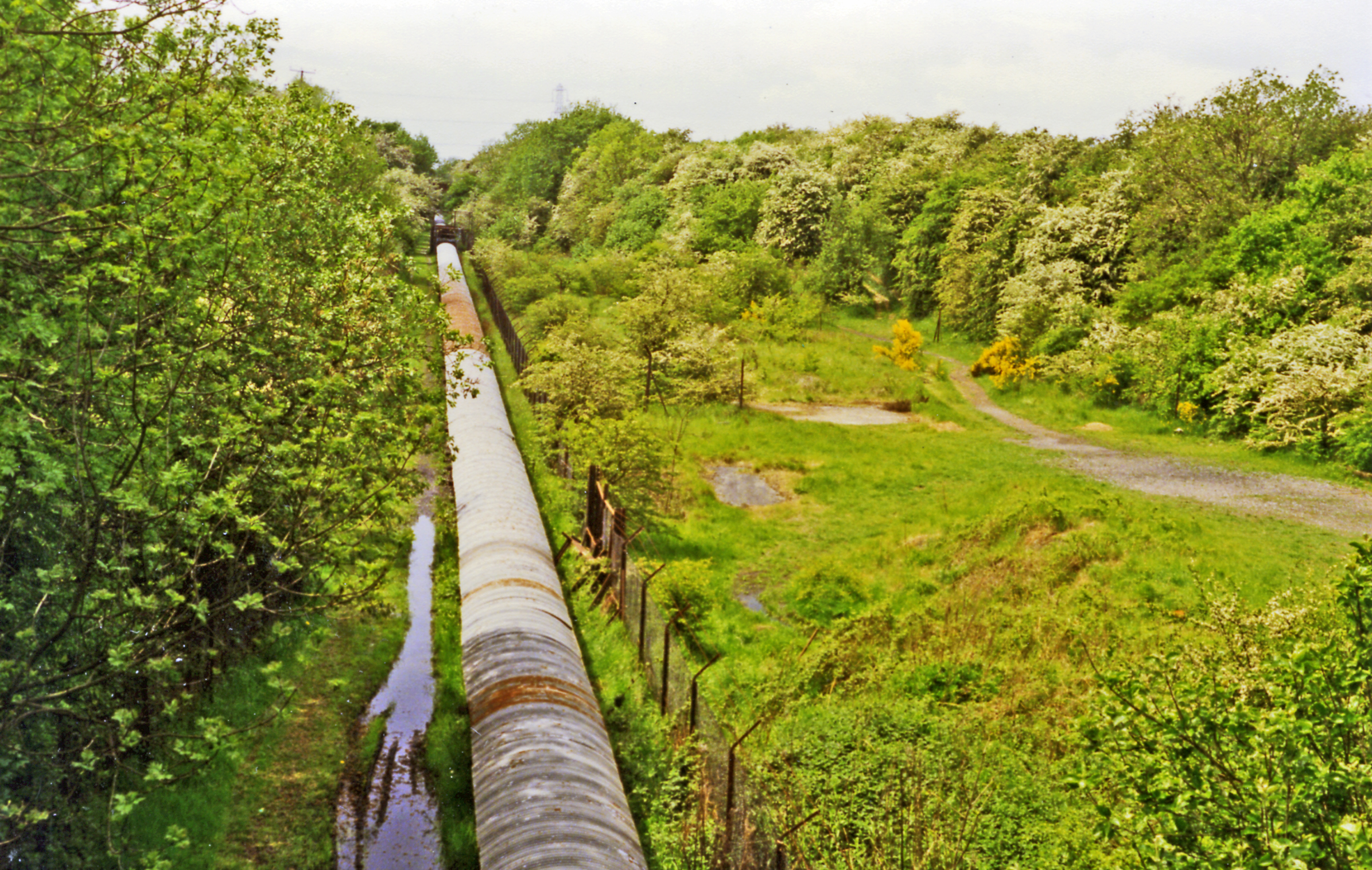
Disused trackbed in 1995, in use as route for a conveyor belt

Hugglescote railway station is a disused railway station on the former Ashby and Nuneaton Joint Railway. It served the large village of Hugglescote where it joined the Leicester - Burton line and Charnwood Forest Railway. It closed in 1931 to passengers but closed to parcel traffic in 1951. Goods continued to pass through until 1965 when the line was closed from Coalville to Shackerstone. The site has since been demolished and is now overgrown. It was briefly used for a conveyor but this has since been removed. The photograph shows the site of the station yard, the station was immediately behind this point of view.

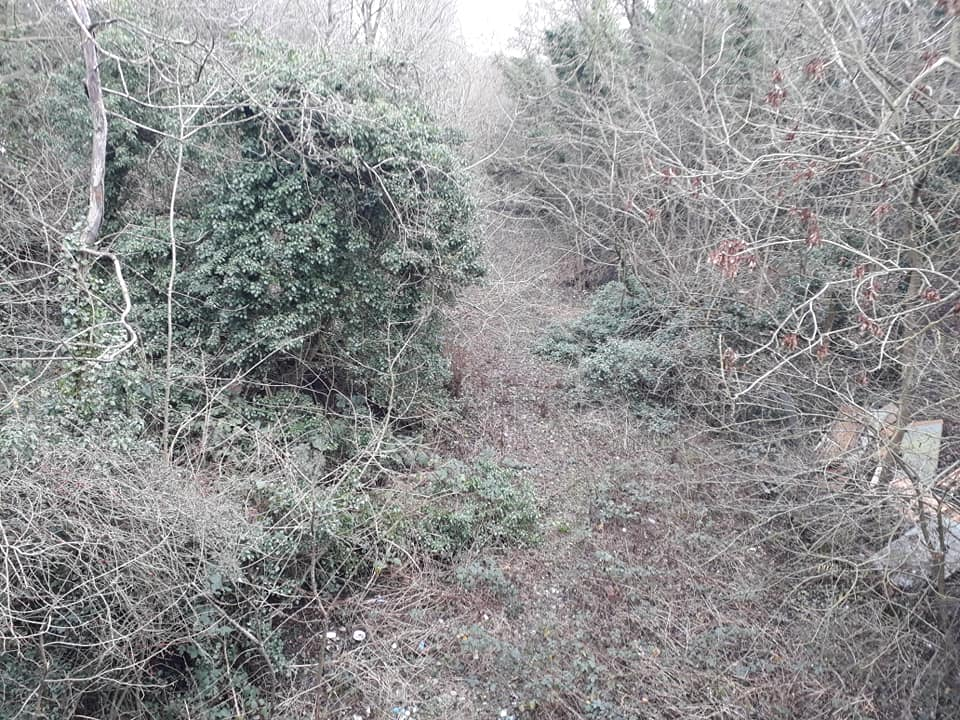

Preceding station	Disused railways	Following station
Coalville; Line and station closed	Midland Railway, London and North Western Railway; Ashby and Nuneaton Joint Railway	Heather and Ibstock; Line and station closed
Coalville East; Line and station closed	London and North Western Railway; Charnwood Forest Railway	Heather and Ibstock; Line and station closed
