= Elizabeth Ridgeway =

English murderer (died 1684)

- Born: Elizabeth Husbands prior to 1653; Ibstock, Leicestershire, England
- Died: 24 March 1684; Leicester, England
- Occupation: Servant
- Criminal charges: Murder
- Penalty: Death by burning

Details
- Victims: 4
- Span of crimes: 1681–1684
- Country: Kingdom of England

Elizabeth Ridgeway (died 24 March 1684) was an English woman convicted of poisoning her husband. While awaiting execution by burning at the stake, she confessed to previously poisoning her mother, a fellow servant, and a lover.

Ridgeway poisoned each of her victims by mixing white mercury or arsenic into her intended victim's food or drink.

== Life ==
Elizabeth Ridgeway, née Husbands, was born in the mid-17th century on a farm outside Ibstock, Leicestershire, England. She lived at home until about age 29, poisoning her mother after an argument, about a year before she took a job in town as a household servant. She poisoned a male co-worker in her household with arsenic, reportedly after developing a grudge against this individual. Ridgeway had many suitors during this time and poisoned John King in 1682 after she had backed herself into a corner romantically, having promised too much to King. She far preferred the wealthier Thomas Ridgeway and married him on 1 February 1683 after waiting through the winter.

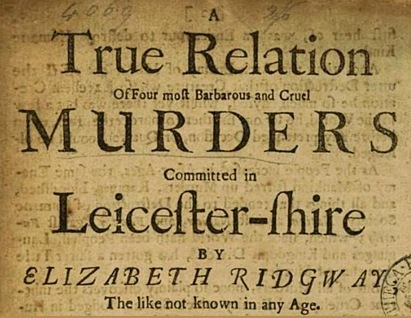
"A True relation of four most barbarous and cruel MURDERS committed in Leicester-shire by ELIZABETH RIDGWAY; The Like not Known in any Age. With the Particulars of Time, Place, (and other Circumstances)..." Printed by George Croom, 1684

All was not bliss as Ridgeway's sister called in his £20 debt to her shortly after the marriage, which nearly bankrupted the couple. She contemplated suicide for a time, but ultimately stirred some arsenic that she had purchased earlier in Ashby-de-la-Zouch into her husband's broth while he was at church. He ate most of it although he complained to his apprentices that it was gritty. Thomas Ridgeway died that evening, three weeks and three days after their wedding.

The apprentices suspected poisoning and, after her attempt to feed them arsenic-laced porridge failed, she attempted to bribe them into silence. One of them reported his suspicions to Ridgeway's in-laws and the local justice of the peace ordered an inquest by the coroner. Examination of the body confirmed that he had been poisoned and Elizabeth Ridgeway was jailed in Leicester to await trial. To test her guilt, she was supposedly forced to touch her husband's body in the belief that the body of the victim would spontaneously bleed in the presence of the murderer (cruentation) and the body gushed blood at the nose and mouth. During her trial on 14 March, she pleaded not guilty, but was convicted and sentenced to burn.

Despite some protests over the severity of the sentence, the judge refused to relent, but did ask John Newton, a local clergyman, to counsel Ridgeway. She had no interest in making her peace with God and toyed with him by promising full confessions multiple times before changing her mind. She finally admitted on the morning of her execution that she had poisoned her mother, a fellow servant, John King, and her husband and confessed that she had thought of suicide around the time of her mother's death three years previously.

== See also ==
- List of serial killers by country

== Bibliography ==
- Telfer, Tori (2017). Lady Killers. New York, New York: HarperCollins. ISBN 978-0-06-243374-9.
