= Shenton railway station =

Heritage railway station in England

Shenton

General information
- Location: Shenton, Hinckley and Bosworth; England
- Coordinates: 52°35′59.00″N 1°24′55.00″W
- Grid reference: SK396004
- System: Station on heritage railway
- Manager: Battlefield Line Railway
- Platforms: 1

Key dates
- 1 September 1873: opened
- 13 April 1931: closed for passengers
- 1965: closed entirely
Location

Shenton railway station is located about 1 mile from the village of Shenton, Leicestershire, England. It currently serves as a glassblowing studio Station Glass, cafe and ticket office. It is the southern terminus of the Battlefield Line Railway.

Shenton Station Pottery

It is the current southern terminus of the Battlefield Line Railway, which runs to here from Shackerstone. The station is located at the foot of Ambion Hill and is actually the reconstructed Humberstone Road railway station from Leicester. The original station closed in 1965 and was dismantled and relocated (except for a small lamp room that now serves as the Station Pottery).

The station is a former stop on the London and North Western Railway and the Midland Railway, who jointly operated the line between Moira West Junction and Nuneaton. The station was designed by the Midland Railway company architect John Holloway Sanders.

Preceding station	Heritage railways	Following station
Market Bosworth towards Shackerstone	Battlefield Line Railway	Terminus
Disused railways
Market Bosworth; Line and station open	Midland Railway, London and North Western Railway; Ashby and Nuneaton Joint Railway	Stoke Golding; Line and station closed
