= Shackerstone railway station =

Former railway station in England

Shackerstone

General information
- Location: Shackerstone, Hinckley and Bosworth; England
- Coordinates: 52°39′20″N 1°26′29″W
- Grid reference: SK379065
- System: Station on heritage railway
- Manager: Battlefield Line Railway
- Platforms: 2

Key dates
- 1873: opened
- 1931: passenger service withdrawn
- 1965: completely closed
Location

Shackerstone railway station is a preserved railway station and heritage museum in the village of Shackerstone in Leicestershire, England. It is the terminus and the headquarters of the heritage Battlefield Line Railway, with the Shackerstone Railwayana Museum, tea room, shop, loco shed and main rolling stock located here.

The Ashby Canal is nearby.

== History ==
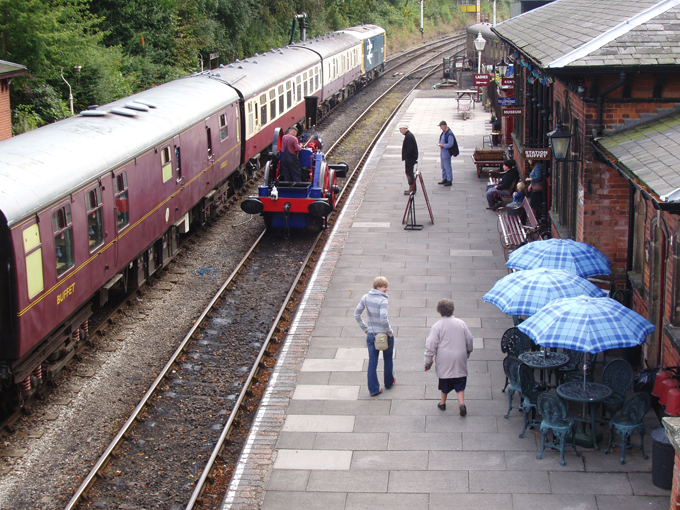
Shackerstone station looking south toward Market Bosworth

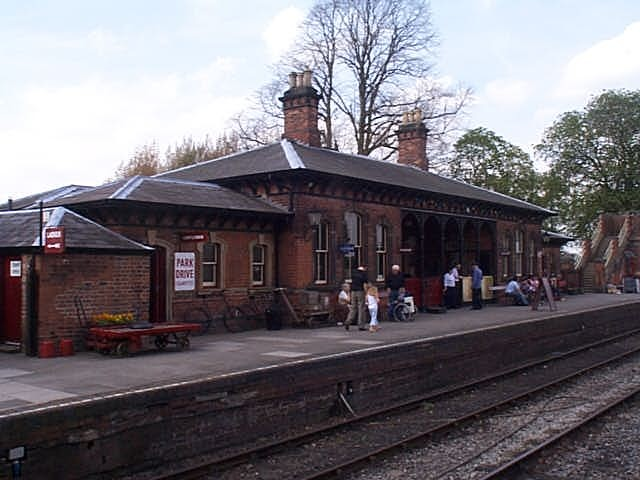
Shackerstone Station

The original intention was to site the station where it is today, but in response to a request from Lord Howe of Gopsall Hall, the Committee agreed to move it north of the junction and call it "Gopsall"; but soon altered their minds and moved it back to the junction. Land for this purpose was bought from Lord Howe, who in 1877, was allowed to plant trees along the approach road to the station. The station was designed by the Midland Railway company architect John Holloway Sanders.

Its position made Shackerstone strategically important in the operation of the line, and it seems to have been selected as the headquarters of the inspector, Manning, in charge of the working of the line. Probably he combined the post with the stationmastership (as was done on the GN-LNWR Joint Line in East Leicestershire at Melton Mowbray) for no stationmaster is named at Shackerstone in the first staff list, and Manning's pay, 50 shillings per week, was much higher than any other member of the ANJR's staff. It must also have ranked in the top class of three varieties of station planned by the committee, for constructional purposes, the estimated cost being £1,300 plus £350 for the stationmaster's house. The building of Shackerstone Station was undertaken by Messrs. J. & E. Woods of Derby, as part of a contract that also included the stations of Measham, Snarestone, Heather and Hugglescote, for which the contract price was £12,826.15. On this basis the price of Shackerstone should have been about £3,500. One thing remains at present unknown: the name of the architect. As the stations on the ANJR are similar to a few on the Midland system, it is likely that they are the work of a member of the Midland Railway's staff, as there is no reference in the minutes to payments to any outside architect in this connection.

During December 1902 King Edward VII, Queen Alexandra along with other dignitaries arrived at the station in the new LNWR Royal Train on their way to Gopsall Hall. The arrival did not go to planned, with the Kings exit door failing to open and the party having to leave from a door further along the train. This is in part due to the raising of platform one, intended to ease the alightment of the royal passengers. This alteration of the platform is still evident and is known as the 'platform hump'.

The station became a grade II listed building in 1989.

== The Sheds ==
The loco shed is signposted from Platform 1 and is only a short walk from the Station through the original goods yard. Access to parts of the shed and workshops are restricted for reasons of safety. The shed is made up of various sections of local NCB buildings and even part of a Nuneaton cinema.

The shed plays host to many different locomotives and is sectioned into two key areas. The main and central area is the "running shed". This features easy access to both the workshop and stores and includes an inside locomotive inspection pit. The 2nd area, which features 2 roads at the south end of the shed, is used many for storage of long-term projects.

In Early 2023 the railway announced that a new engine shed was to be constructed. As of March 2023 they were in the fundraising stage.

Preceding station	Heritage railways	Following station
Terminus	Battlefield Line Railway	Market Bosworth towards Shenton
Disused railways
Heather and Ibstock; Line and station closed	Midland Railway, London and North Western Railway; Ashby and Nuneaton Joint Railway	Market Bosworth; Line and station open
Snarestone; Line and station closed	Midland Railway, London and North Western Railway; Ashby and Nuneaton Joint Railway	Market Bosworth; Line and station open
