= Battlefield Line Railway =

Heritage railway in Leicestershire, England

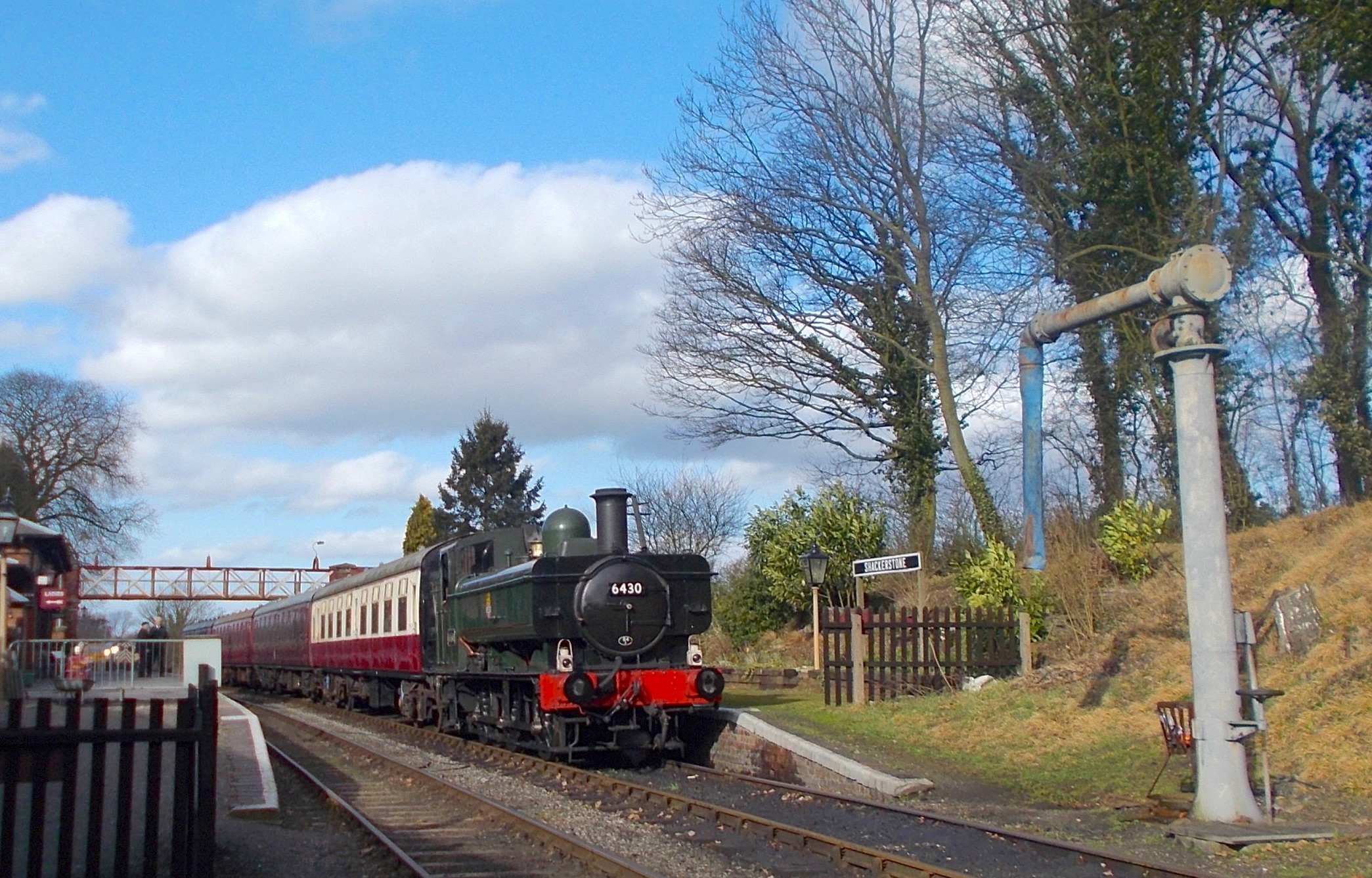
- British Railways (Western Region) 0-6-0PT 64xx Class No. 6430 at Shackerstone

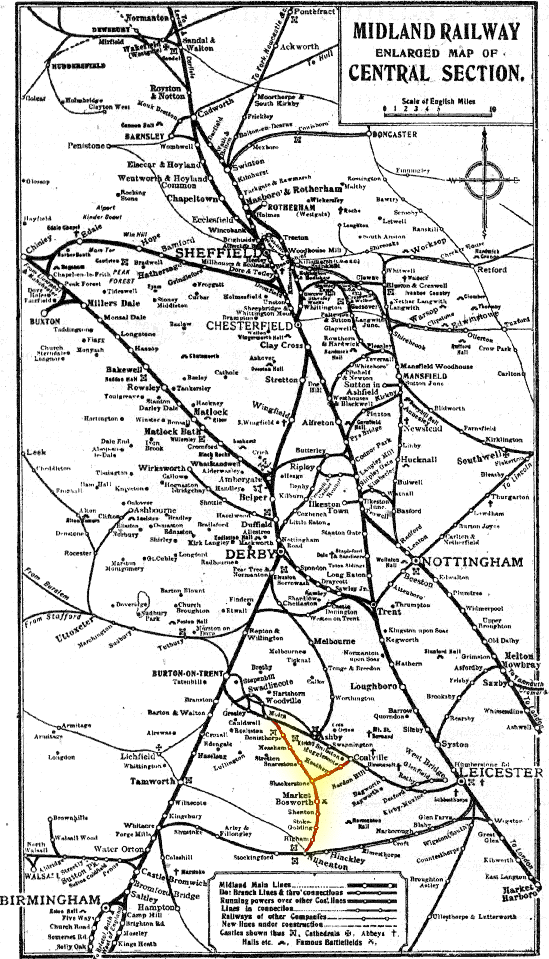
- The Battlefield Line, as shown on a period map

Commercial operations
- Name: London and North Western Railway; Midland Railway; British Rail
- Built by: London and North Western Railway
- Original gauge: 4 ft 8 1/2 in (1,435 mm) standard gauge

Preserved operations
- Owned by: Shackerstone Railway Society
- Operated by: Shackerstone Railway Society
- Length: 5 mi (8.0 km)
- Preserved gauge: 4 ft 8 1/2 in (1,435 mm) standard gauge

Commercial history
- Opened: 1873
- Closed: 1965

Preservation history
- 1973: Partial re-opening
- Headquarters: Shackerstone

Website
- www.battlefieldline.co.uk

Ashby and Nuneaton Joint Railway
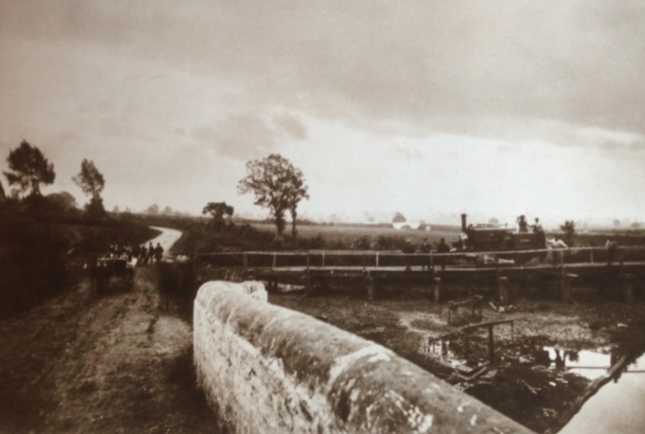
- Construction of the Ashby & Nuneaton joint railway near Dadlington using a Manning Wardle tank engine

The Battlefield Line Railway is a heritage railway in Leicestershire, England. It runs from Shackerstone to Shenton, via Market Bosworth, which is a total of 5 miles (8.0 km). Shenton is near Bosworth Field, which was the location of the final battle of the Wars of the Roses, immortalised in Shakespeare's Richard III, and inspired the name of the railway.

== Overview ==
The railway runs steam and diesel-hauled trains every weekend and bank holiday from March to December. In addition, a summer mid-week service is operated by the heritage diesel railcar; these run on Wednesdays in July and September and Tuesdays, Wednesdays and Thursdays in August. Special events take place throughout the year, including the Christmas Santa Specials.

== History ==
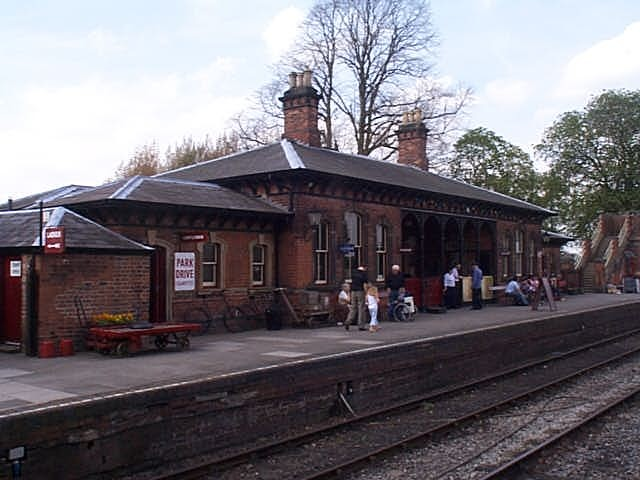
Shackerstone Station

The railway used to be part of the London and North Western Railway and the Midland Railway, who operated the line jointly between Moira West Junction and Nuneaton. The first trains ran along this section in 1873. At Shackerstone station, there was once a junction where one section branched off towards Moira and Ashby and the other went towards Coalville Junction. In 1883, the Charnwood Forest Railway was opened, which extended the branch from Coalville Junction to Loughborough's Derby Road station, passing through the village of Whitwick and town of Shepshed. In the 1923 Grouping, these lines were assigned to the London Midland and Scottish Railway. In 1931, the last scheduled passenger train went down the Charnwood Forest branch, with the line then only being open to freight and excursions until the 1960s. The Coalville Junction – Shackerstone section was dismantled and closed completely in 1964. The Ashby–Nuneaton line had its last passenger service in 1965, which was an enthusiasts' special, before British Rail pulled the rails up in 1970. In its heyday, Shackerstone was a busy station, with steam trains doing the workings between Ashby and Nuneaton, whilst a railcar did the service between Shackerstone and Loughborough Derby Road.

The line was originally double track but was later singled. Part of the line was called the Bluebell Line (the Charnwood Forest Line, Hugglescote to Loughborough Derby Road station; this line was only accessible via the ANJR).

The royal train now in the National Railway Museum went to Shackerstone on its first outing in December 1902. It conveyed King Edward VII, Queen Alexandra and Princess Victoria on their way to Gopsall Hall, where Handel is reputed to have composed his oratorio Messiah.

=== Renovation project ===
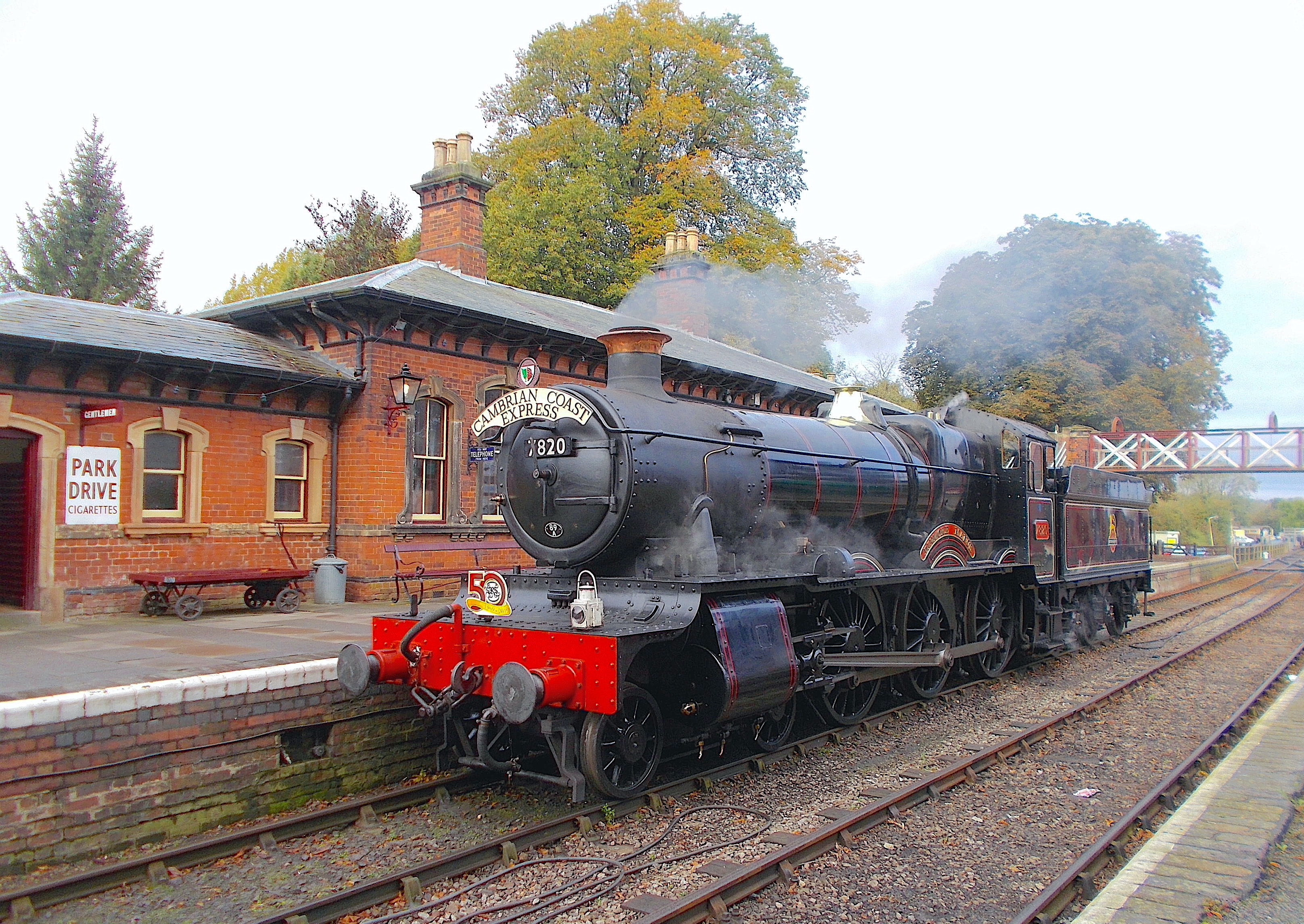
British Railways 78xx Class No. 7820 'Dinmore Manor' at Shackerstone

The Shackerstone Railway Society was set up in 1969 at Market Bosworth, but soon moved to Shackerstone in 1970, as they needed a proper home for their first steam engine. When they got to Shackerstone they found one through line still intact, and their first aim was to build some sidings. Later they reinstated the "down" platform and connected the sidings to the line to Market Bosworth.

In 1973, to celebrate the centenary of the line, a small train of open wagons was hauled to Market Bosworth. Following the successful conclusions of the negotiations with British Rail, a start was made on track rearrangements which created run-round loops at both ends of the line and a number of sidings at Shackerstone.

In the 1980s, the Battlefield Line launched a campaign to extend their line to Shenton. This involved buying 1 1/2 miles (2.4 km) of track and in 1992, after a successful campaign, the inaugural service arrived, hauled by the appropriately named 0-6-0 tank engine "Richard III." In 1994, Shackerstone Station featured in an episode of Rosie & Jim showcasing how a Steam Locomotive works. Featured was Hunslet 3855 'Glasshoughton Number 4'

== Route ==
The first section of the journey travelling south from Shackerstone (Grid ref SK 379 065) is a climbing gradient which continues until the train is clear of the station limits. The signal box on the left is the oldest Midland Railway Co. type one box still in operational use. The train then passes under the first bridge which carries the road to Barton-in-the-Beans, and into open farmland.

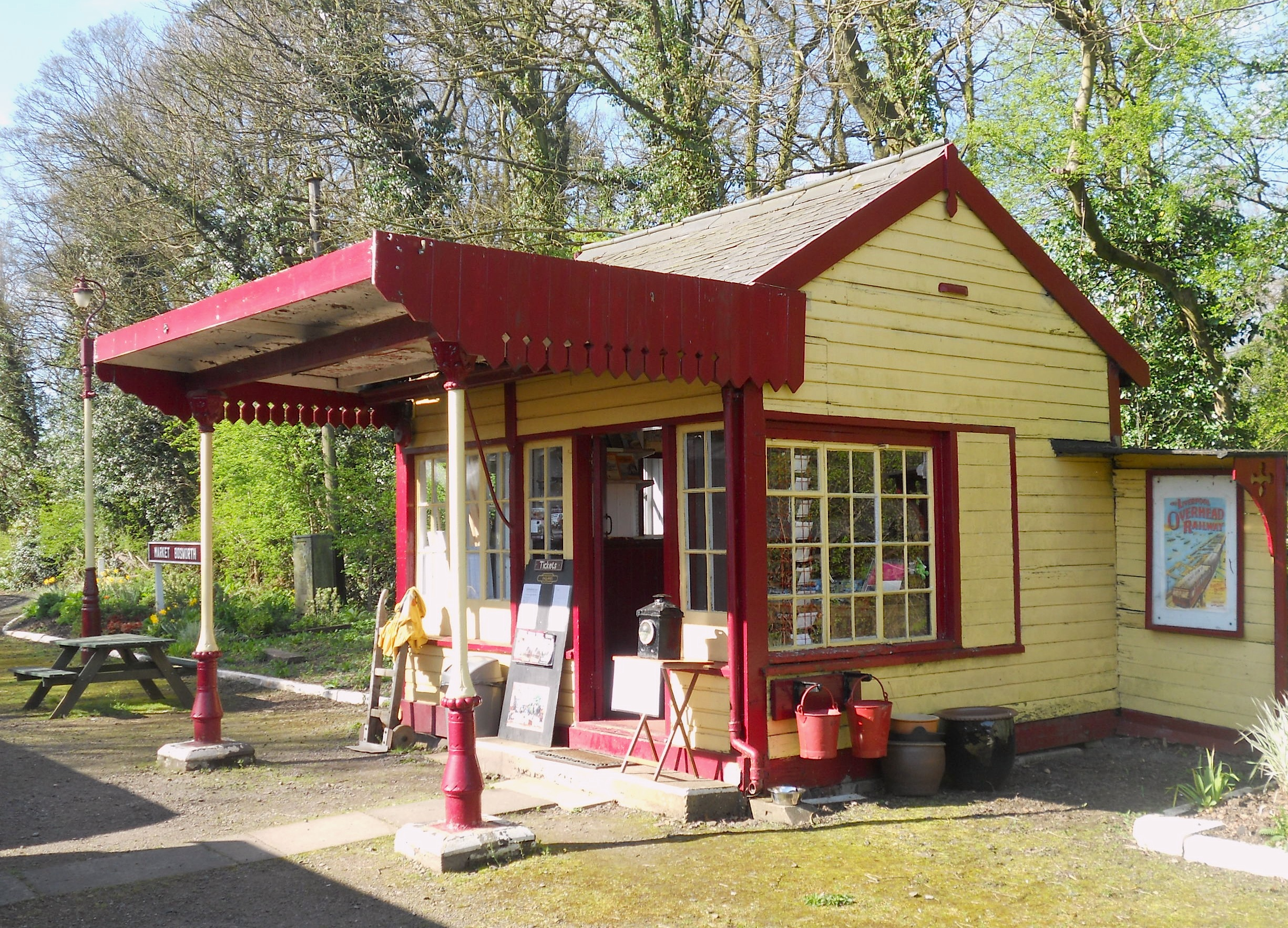
Market Bosworth Station

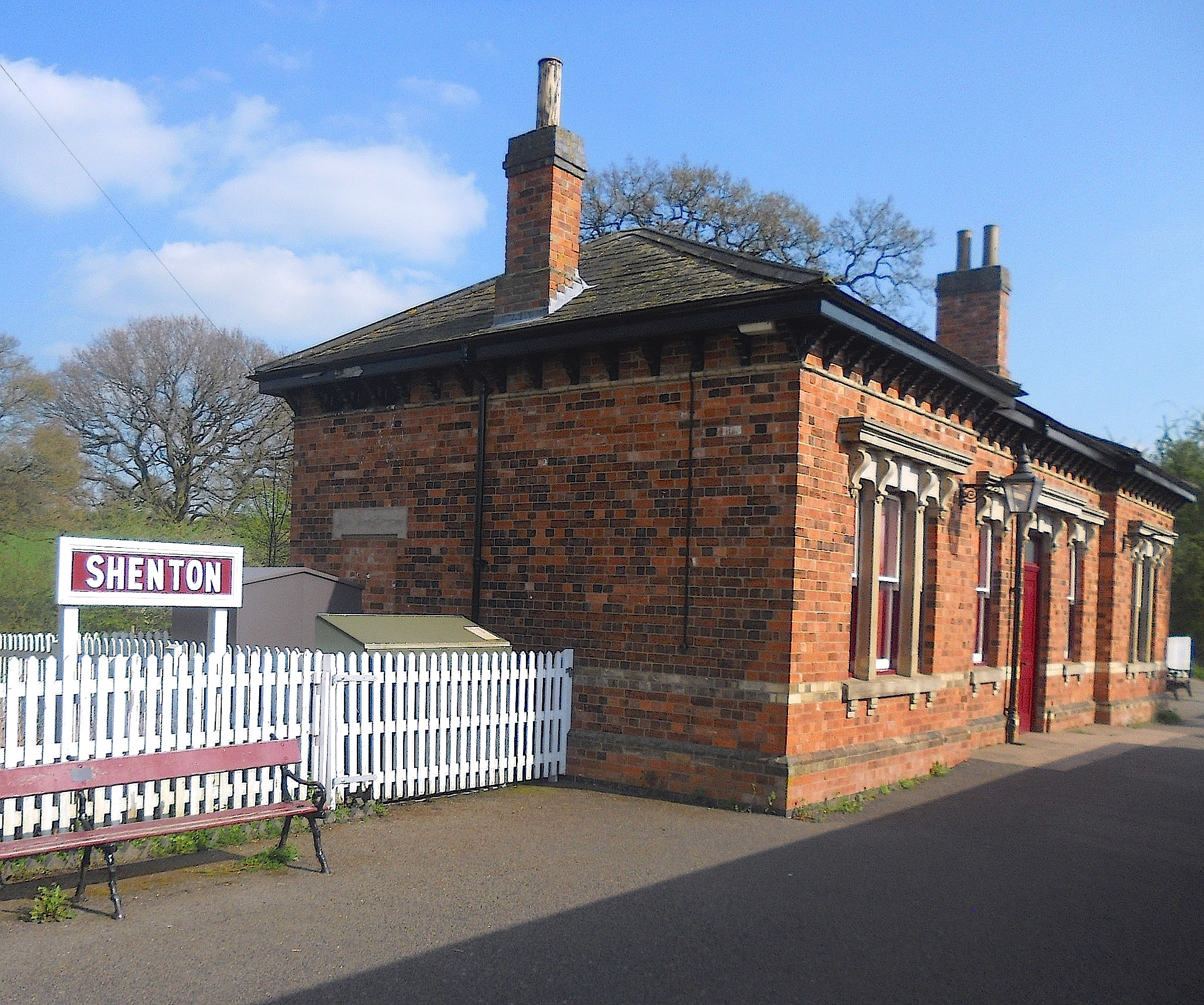
Shenton station

Market Bosworth is 3 miles (4.8 km) from Shackerstone. There are usually stored locomotives or wagons here. To the right can be seen the old buildings and signal box which used to control part of the operation of the station.

South of Market Bosworth station, the train passes Aqueduct Cottage and the Ashby Canal aqueduct beyond it. Trains slow as they cross the road bridge between Shenton and Sutton Cheney. As the line curves to the right, the train approaches the terminus at Shenton (SK 396 002), just over 4 1/2 miles (7.2 km) away from Shackerstone. The station pottery is the only surviving part of the original station. The present station is the reconstructed Humberstone Road station from Leicester. At the end of the line is a headshunt underneath an old cattle bridge. The small bridge was previously used to allow safe passage of farm traffic over the original railway.

== Rolling Stock ==
=== Diesel Multiple Units ===
Number & Name	Description	Current Status	Livery	Image
DMBS No M55005.	Class 122	Operational, used on passenger trains regularly (Railway owned). Built in 1958.	BR Blue	
DMS No 51321	Class 118	Sole survivor of the class (Railway owned). Built in 1960.	BR Green	
DMBS No 51131	Class 116	Operational, used on passenger trains regularly (Railway owned). Built in 1958.	BR Green	
