= Ashby and Nuneaton Joint Railway =

Railway in UK

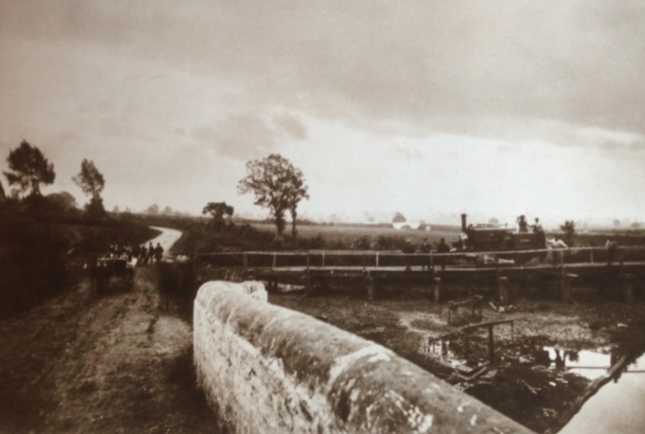
- Construction of the Ashby & Nuneaton joint railway near Dadlington using a Manning Wardle tank engine

The Ashby and Nuneaton Joint Railway was a pre-grouping railway company in the English Midlands, built to serve the Leicestershire coalfield. Both the Midland Railway and the London and North Western Railway (LNWR) wished to build a line on similar alignments, and they agreed to build jointly. Construction began in 1869 and the railway was opened in 1873. It linked Moira (near Ashby-de-la-Zouch) and Coalville with Nuneaton. Mineral traffic was busy, and the line formed a useful link for through goods trains. Some long distance passenger operation took place over the line, but it was never successful in carrying passengers.

The LNWR sponsored the Charnwood Forest Railway which branched off the Joint Railway near Coalville and ran to a terminus at Loughborough. The intention had been to connect to the Midland Railway main line there, but that attempt was refused. The passenger traffic on the Joint Railway and the CFR ceased in 1931, and the goods activity progressively ran down from 1964 onwards. The entire network is now closed to ordinary commercial railway operation, but a heritage railway operates near Market Bosworth.

== Canals and early railways ==
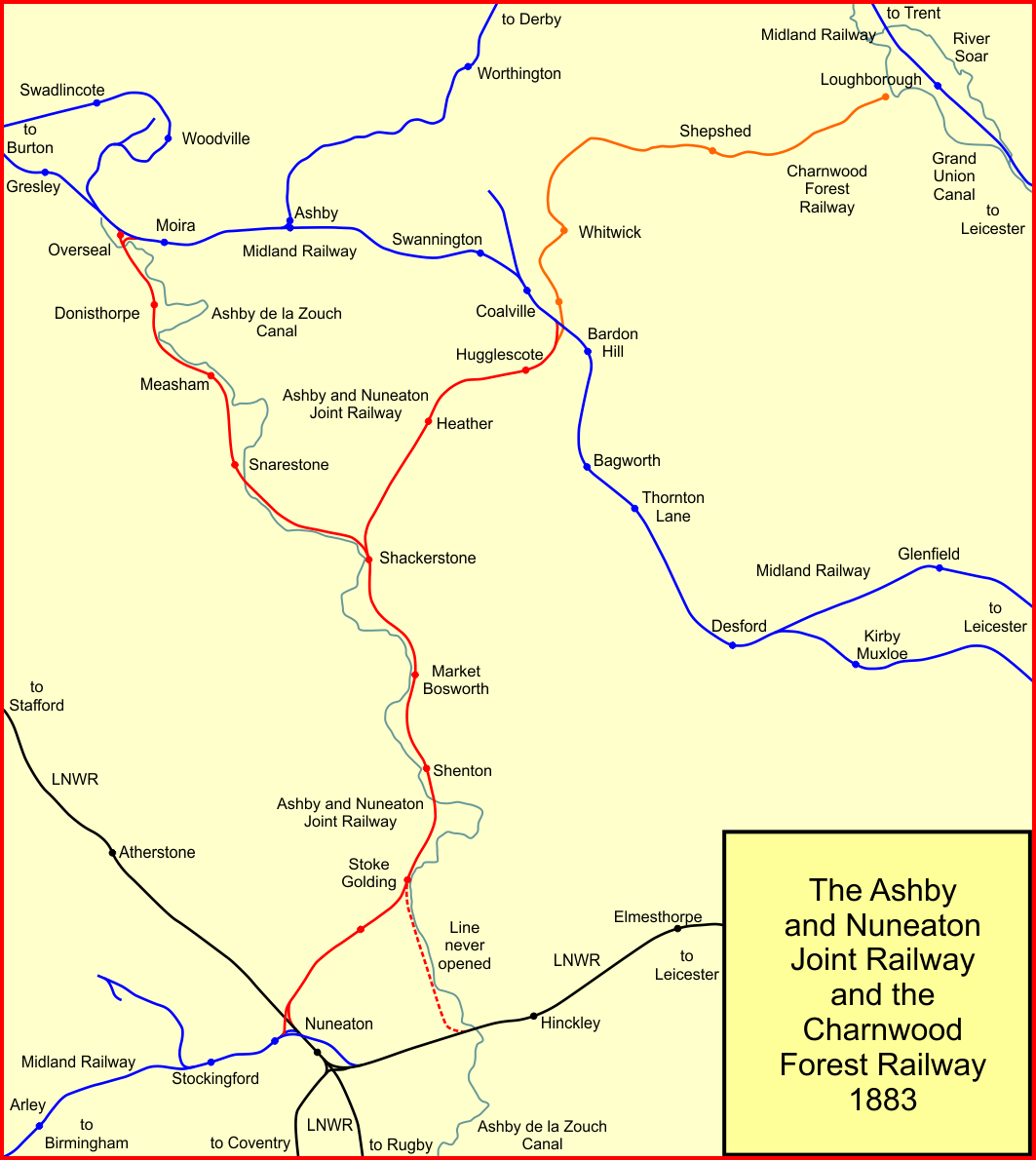
System map of the Ashby and Nuneaton Joint Railway and the Charnwood Forest Railway

The area surrounding the town of Ashby-de-la-Zouch was an important mineral-rich district producing coal, clay and high-quality stone. Heavy minerals were expensive to transport to market by animal power, and when canals became available, costs reduced considerably. The Ashby Canal and the Charnwood Forest Canal of the Leicester Navigation Company were constructed locally.

The first proposal for a railway through the district came in 1844. An independent company proposed the construction of a Rugby, Derby and Manchester line, to be capitalised at £1.5 million, which would have passed through Hinckley, Market Bosworth and Ashby-de-la-Zouch. At this early date the Midland Railway was fiercely territorial, and having acquired the Leicester and Swannington Railway, it wished to protect the area it considered to be its own from incursion. It opposed the scheme by putting forward its own line from Ashby to Hinckley, taking over a canal which followed much the same route. The Midland Railway purchased the canal in 1846 but did not proceed with construction of the line.

Midland Railway (Ashby and Nuneaton, &c.) Act 1866
- Act of Parliament
- Parliament of the United Kingdom
- Long title: An Act for enabling the Midland Railway Company to construct Railways for improving the Communication between Ashby-de-la-Zouch and Nuneaton and other Places; and for other Purposes.
- Citation: 29 & 30 Vict. c. cccxv

Dates
- Royal assent: 6 August 1866

In 1865 the London and North Western Railway put forward a scheme for a similar line, and the Midland Railway once again tried to fend it off with the Midland Railway (Ashby and Nuneaton, &c.) Act 1866 (29 & 30 Vict. c. cccxv) of 6 August 1866. As planned at the time, the main section of the line was to be a double track route from Ashby, on the Midland line between Burton and Leicester, and Hinckley on the Nuneaton to Leicester line of the LNWR, a distance of 18 miles on a north-west to south axis. In addition, there would be a four mile line from Stoke Golding south-westwards to Nuneaton LNWR station, and a spur at Nuneaton to the Midland Railway station. There would be a six-mile north-eastwards line from Shackerstone to Coalville, and a short spur near Moira forming a triangular junction. This amounted to 29 miles of railway, and authorised share capital was to be £350,000.

== Joint railway authorised ==
The LNWR reacted with a bill for the 1867 session of Parliament for a railway covering the same ground, but also going further to reach Burton, connecting several collieries on the way. Now the LNWR and the Midland Railway agreed to co-operate, and this resulted in agreement on a joint undertaking, to be called the Ashby and Nuneaton Joint Railway. The LNWR and Midland Railway would operate passenger trains, and the company would run its own trains from all the collieries in the Leicestershire coalfield.

London and North Western Railway (Ashby and Nuneaton Lines) Act 1867
- Act of Parliament
- Parliament of the United Kingdom
- Long title: An Act to vest in the London and North-western Railway Company, jointly with the Midland Railway Company, certain Railways between Ashby and Nuneaton in the County of Leicester; and for other Purposes.
- Citation: 30 & 31 Vict. c. xciv

Dates
- Royal assent: 17 June 1867

Text of statute as originally enacted

Midland and London and North Western Railways (Ashby and Nuneaton Railway) Act 1868
- Act of Parliament
- Parliament of the United Kingdom
- Long title: An Act to confer further Powers on the Midland and London and North-western Railway Companies for the Construction of Works in connexion with their Ashby and Nuneaton Railway; and for other Purposes.
- Citation: 31 & 32 Vict. c. xlix

Dates
- Royal assent: 25 June 1868

Text of statute as originally enacted

On 17 June 1867 the necessary act, the London and North Western Railway (Ashby and Nuneaton Lines) Act 1867 (30 & 31 Vict. c. xciv), was passed authorising the LNWR to work jointly with the MR to construct and maintain lines previously authorised to the Midland Railway. The LNWR was authorised to raise £200,000 as its share of the joint venture. Altered arrangements were necessary at Nuneaton, where a connection from Stoke Golding to the Trent Valley line of the LNWR north of Nuneaton, and another short connection to the Midland Railway at Nuneaton Abbey Junction. The following year, on 25 June 1868, the Midland and London and North Western Railways (Ashby and Nuneaton Railway) Act 1868 (31 & 32 Vict. c. xlix) was ratified and certain deviations were authorised.

Bad weather and labour problems delayed the completion of the work, and it was estimated that the cost of building the line had overrun by £67,438, to £349,715, "mostly due to the effect of heavy rain". Some of the route closely followed the Ashby canal, but whereas the latter twisted with the contours to maintain its level, numerous cuttings and embankments carried the railway in a more direct line. These caused considerable difficulty during construction as the contractors frequently encountered waterlogged sand and unstable clay which oozed out in sticky landslides. No spectacular engineering works proved necessary but in such an intensively farmed district nearly a hundred red brick bridges were required to carry country lanes, or as occupation crossings where property had been severed.

== Opening ==
The line opened on 18 August 1873 for goods trains, and on 1 September 1873 for all trains. There had been a celebratory opening ceremony on 16 August 1873. Passenger operation on the Shackerstone to Coalville section started on 1 September 1873. The main traffic of the Joint Line was coal trains taking the mineral from the Moira and Coalville districts to London; typically ten mineral trains daily were reported to be running in 1932.

Passenger traffic consisted of five down and six up trains between Nuneaton and Ashby, but in July 1890 the number of trains was nearly doubled, when a through service from Burton to Nuneaton was started. By 1892 this service was further enhanced to give through workings to Manchester via Leek and Macclesfield. When the LNWR route between Ashbourne and Parsley Hay opened in 1901, a new route from Buxton to Euston became available and two trains ran in each direction on weekdays. However all the through workings were discontinued during World War I. Through goods trains between Lancashire and Yorkshire and London used the branch particularly at night, and express milk trains from Derbyshire were also operated for many years.

== Hinckley line ==
The Hinckley line from Shackerstone Junction was completed as a double track route, but it was never used. Hinckley had been selected as the apparently obvious LNWR connection for the Joint Railway, but Nuneaton had many practical advantages, particularly as it was already a significant LNWR junction. It seems likely that the controversy of the LNWR's involvement and the negotiation of the joint status of the line caused the need for this section not to be questioned.

Captain Tyler visited the line for the purpose of carrying out the Board of Trade inspection and found some deficiencies, at which point John Crossley, the engineer for the line, stated that the line would not be opened, and that it would be acceptable if Tyler omitted the issue of approving it altogether. On 14 January 1875, local residents petitioned again for the line to be opened, but the company took legal opinion and were advised that there was no legal obligation actually to open it. The line was formally abandoned by an act of Parliament in 1914.

== The Charnwood Forest Railway ==
The Charnwood Forest Railway was authorised on 16 July 1874. It was an independent concern, and its purpose was to link the Ashby and Nuneaton Joint Railway at Coalville with the Midland Railway at Loughborough. The line was built from a junction near Coalville to its own Loughborough station, but the connection with the Midland line there was never made. The line was operated by the London and North Western Railway from its opening on 16 April 1883; the LNWR operated five passenger trains each way daily. The Charnwood Forest Company remained independent until Grouping in 1923, (Note: In 1923 most of the railway companies in Great Britain were compulsorily transferred into one or other of four new large companies, in a process known as the "Grouping", following the Railways Act 1921 Although the target date was 1 January 1923, trailing negotiations over compensation delayed many railways beyond that date.) when it was taken into the London Midland and Scottish Railway on 14 July 1923.

From the opening of the Charnwood Forest line, passenger trains on the Shackerstone-Coalville section of the joint line were worked by the LNWR, the motor trains working through to Loughborough. These ceased in 1931, and the whole Charnwood Forest line closed entirely in 1964.

The Charnwood Forest company was in the hands of the receiver from 1885 to 1909, and never paid a dividend on ordinary shares throughout its existence.

The proposal to extend at Loughborough to join the Midland Railway there was revived in 1908 but once again it was not proceeded with. After passenger closure in 1931, freight continued in the form of a pick-up goods that shunted in the various goods yards, sidings, quarries and collieries along the line. Ordinary freight services ceased on 7 October 1963, but the line from Coalville (Charnwood Forest Junction) was kept open as far as Shepshed for private siding traffic. However on 15 December 1963 the entire Charnwood Forest line was closed.

== Later operations, and closure ==
Through passenger services on the Ashby Line started on 1 July 1890, running from Nuneaton, via Burton to Uttoxeter and Ashbourne. Other enhancements followed, including a slip coach from Euston, slipped at Nuneaton via the Ashby & Nuneaton line, and continuing to Buxton. A return working was attached to a main line train at Rugby. The passenger service had never been buoyant financially, and it was discontinued from 13 April 1931. Nevertheless, after passenger closure the line continued to be busy with through freight traffic. Seventeen daily freight trains traversed the line from then, right up until 1948. There were a number of fitted freight trains operating, some originating as far away as Accrington. Several used the Churnet Valley Railway to Stockport.

After the ordinary passenger service ceased on both lines on 13 April 1931, excursions continued to run to Skegness until 1961. Freight traffic ceased from Shackestone to Hugglescote on 6 April 1964, the section from Measham to Market Bosworth being closed to all traffic on 12 November 1971, and Market Bosworth to Nuneaton on 19 July 1971. A short section at Hugglescote reopened about 1976 as part of the new rail link to Coalfield Farm open cast site loading point. This was currently in use in 1988. From Measham and Donisthorpe Colliery to Overseal (the northern end of the joint line) closed to all traffic on 20 June 1981.

== Locations ==
- Moira West Junction; on Midland Railway line from Leicester to Burton;
  - Moira East Junction; east facing junction;
- Moira South Junction;
- Donisthorpe; opened 1 May 1874; closed 13 April 1931;
- Measham; opened 1 September 1873; closed 13 April 1931;
- Snarestone; opened 1 September 1873; closed 13 April 1931;
- Shackerston; opened 1 September 1873; closed 13 April 1931;
- Market Bosworth; opened 1 September 1873; closed 13 April 1931;
- Shenton; opened 1 September 1873; closed 13 April 1931;
- Stoke Golding; opened 1 September 1873; closed 13 April 1931;
- Higham on the Hill; opened 1 September 1873; closed 13 April 1931;
- Nuneaton Abbey Street; Midland Railway station;
  - Nuneaton Trent Valley; LNWR station.

=== Coalville branch ===
- Coalville Junction;
- Charnwood Forest Junction;
- Hugglescote; opened 1 September 1873; closed 13 April 1931;
- Heather; opened 1 September 1873; renamed Heather & Ibstock 1 September 1894; closed 13 April 1931;
- Shackerstone; above.

=== Charnwood Forest Railway ===
- Charnwood Forest Junction;
- Coalville East; opened 16 April 1883; renamed Coalville 1 May 1905; renamed Coalville LNW May 1910; renamed Coalville East 2 June 1924; closed 13 April 1931;
- Whitwick; opened 16 April 1883; closed 13 April 1931;
- Thringstone; opened 2 April 1907; closed 13 April 1931;
- Grace Dieu; opened 2 April 1907; closed 13 April 1931;
- Sheepshed; opened 16 April 1883; renamed Shepshed 1888; closed 13 April 1931;
- Snells Nook; opened 2 April 1907; closed 13 April 1931;
- Loughborough; opened 16 April 1883; closed 13 April 1931.

== Heritage railway ==
Part of the line between Shackerstone and Shenton has been re-opened as the Battlefield Line Railway, a heritage railway.
