= Grade II* listed buildings in Hinckley and Bosworth =

There are over 20,000 Grade II* listed buildings in England. This page is a list of these buildings in Hinckley and Bosworth.

== Hinckley and Bosworth ==
Name	Location	Type	Completed (Note: The date given is the date used by Historic England as significant for the initial building or that of an important part in the structure's description.)	Date designated	Grid ref. (Note: The grid reference is based on the British national grid reference system, sometimes known as OSGB36, used by the Ordnance Survey.) Geo-coordinates	Entry number (Note: The "List Entry Number" is a unique number assigned to each listed building and scheduled monument by Historic England.)	Image
Church of St Catherine	Burbage, Hinckley and Bosworth	Parish Church	1842	8 March 1963	SP4427592747; 52°31′51″N 1°20′56″W	1295212	Church of St Catherine More images
The Old Grange and Attached Stable Wing	Burbage, Hinckley and Bosworth	Kitchen	1697	8 March 1963	SP4440092657; 52°31′48″N 1°20′49″W	1178068	Upload Photo
Church of All Saints	Cadeby, Hinckley and Bosworth	Parish Church	Late 13th century	7 November 1966	SK4258302339; 52°37′02″N 1°22′21″W	1074283	Church of All Saints More images
Old Manor House and attached barn and service block	Desford, Hinckley and Bosworth	Farmhouse	19th century	22 October 1952	SK4789903334; 52°37′32″N 1°17′38″W	1074078	Upload Photo
Church of St Martin	Desford, Hinckley and Bosworth	Parish Church	Late 13th century	7 November 1966	SK4786203469; 52°37′37″N 1°17′40″W	1361378	Church of St Martin More images
Church of St Simon and St Jude	Earl Shilton, Hinckley and Bosworth	Parish Church	15th century	8 March 1963	SP4711698198; 52°34′46″N 1°18′22″W	1074259	Church of St Simon and St Jude More images
Stables and kennels to Bradgate House	Groby, Hinckley and Bosworth	Kennels	1856	29 November 1988	SK5070209288; 52°40′44″N 1°15′05″W	1361383	Upload Photo
Groby Old Hall	Groby, Hinckley and Bosworth	House	Late 15th century	22 October 1952	SK5238907574; 52°39′48″N 1°13′37″W	1074083	Groby Old Hall More images
Church of St Peter	Higham on the Hill, Hinckley and Bosworth	Parish Church	12th century	7 November 1966	SP3826795560; 52°33′24″N 1°26′13″W	1178178	Church of St Peter More images
Bosworth Hall	Market Bosworth, Hinckley and Bosworth	Country House Hotel	c1680-90	28 May 1987	SK4083803332; 52°37′34″N 1°23′53″W	1251547	Bosworth Hall More images
Church of St Peter	Market Bosworth, Hinckley and Bosworth	Parish Church	13th century	7 November 1966	SK4074703260; 52°37′32″N 1°23′58″W	1307453	Church of St Peter More images
The Dower House	Market Bosworth, Hinckley and Bosworth	House	Early 18th century	3 August 1970	SK4060403237; 52°37′31″N 1°24′06″W	1361288	Upload Photo
Church of St Michael	Markfield, Hinckley and Bosworth	Parish Church	C12-C14	7 November 1966	SK4870510039; 52°41′09″N 1°16′51″W	1320243	Church of St Michael More images
Church of All Saints	Nailstone, Hinckley and Bosworth	Parish Church	Late 14th century	7 November 1966	SK4180507143; 52°39′37″N 1°23′00″W	1361277	Church of All Saints More images
Osbaston Hall	Osbaston, Hinckley and Bosworth	Country House	Late 16th century	7 November 1966	SK4237504512; 52°38′12″N 1°22′31″W	1361278	Osbaston Hall More images
Church of All Saints	Kirkby Mallory, Peckleton, Hinckley and Bosworth	Parish Church	Early 14th century	7 November 1966	SK4540800344; 52°35′56″N 1°19′52″W	1074237	Church of All Saints More images
Church of St Martin	Stapleton, Peckleton, Hinckley and Bosworth	Church	Early 14th century	7 November 1966	SP4347198451; 52°34′56″N 1°21′36″W	1074234	Church of St Martin More images
Church of St Philip and St James	Ratby, Hinckley and Bosworth	Parish Church	C13, C14, C15	7 November 1966	SK5131105963; 52°38′56″N 1°14′35″W	1074093	Church of St Philip and St James More images
Church of St Mary the Virgin	Congerstone, Shackerstone, Hinckley and Bosworth	Parish Church	16th century	7 November 1966	SK3669705447; 52°38′44″N 1°27′33″W	1074210	Church of St Mary the Virgin More images
Church of St Peter	Shackerstone, Hinckley and Bosworth	Parish Church	Late 15th century	7 November 1966	SK3741306737; 52°39′25″N 1°26′54″W	1188168	Church of St Peter More images
Help-out Mill	Odstone, Shackerstone, Hinckley and Bosworth	Mill House	Early 19th century	10 January 1973	SK3791507811; 52°40′00″N 1°26′27″W	1188178	Help-out Mill More images
Church of All Saints	Sheepy Magna, Sheepy, Hinckley and Bosworth	Parish Church	15th century	11 June 1966	SK3261201321; 52°36′31″N 1°31′11″W	1177853	Church of All Saints More images
Church of St Botolph	Sibson, Sheepy, Hinckley and Bosworth	Church	Late C13-early 14th century	7 November 1966	SK3541500910; 52°36′17″N 1°28′43″W	1177977	Church of St Botolph More images
The Great Barn at Newhouse Grange	Sheepy Magna, Sheepy, Hinckley and Bosworth	Aisled Barn	14th century	7 November 1966	SK3176402349; 52°37′05″N 1°31′56″W	1361280	Upload Photo
Church of St James	Sutton Cheney, Hinckley and Bosworth	Church	1635	7 November 1966	SK4164500471; 52°36′02″N 1°23′12″W	1074245	Church of St James More images
Church of St James	Dadlington, Sutton Cheney, Hinckley and Bosworth	Church	Late 13th century	7 November 1966	SP4036198064; 52°34′44″N 1°24′21″W	1361304	Church of St James More images
Church of St John the Evangelist	Shenton, Sutton Cheney, Hinckley and Bosworth	Parish Church	c. 1860	7 November 1966	SK3867100336; 52°35′58″N 1°25′50″W	1074247	Church of St John the Evangelist More images
Shenton Hall	Shenton, Sutton Cheney, Hinckley and Bosworth	House	c. 1620	7 November 1966	SK3873000297; 52°35′57″N 1°25′47″W	1178135	Shenton Hall More images
Dovecote at Shenton Hall	Shenton, Sutton Cheney, Hinckley and Bosworth	Dovecote	1719	7 November 1966	SK3867900291; 52°35′57″N 1°25′49″W	1074248	Upload Photo
Gatehouse to Shenton Hall	Shenton, Sutton Cheney, Hinckley and Bosworth	Gatehouse	1629	7 November 1966	SK3871500331; 52°35′58″N 1°25′47″W	1361305	Gatehouse to Shenton Hall
Hall Farmhouse	Sutton Cheney, Hinckley and Bosworth	Farmhouse	Early 17th century	22 October 1952	SK4182700516; 52°36′03″N 1°23′02″W	1074243	Upload Photo
Church of the Holy Trinity	Norton Juxta Twycross, Twycross, Hinckley and Bosworth	Church	Early 14th century	7 November 1966	SK3228607066; 52°39′37″N 1°31′27″W	1294757	Church of the Holy Trinity More images
Church of All Saints	Ratcliffe Culey, Witherley, Hinckley and Bosworth	Church	Early 14th century	7 November 1966	SP3267699416; 52°35′30″N 1°31′09″W	1188508	Church of All Saints More images
Church of St Michael	Fenny Drayton, Witherley, Hinckley and Bosworth	Parish Church	12th century	7 November 1966	SP3503897113; 52°34′15″N 1°29′04″W	1361313	Church of St Michael More images
Church of the Assumption of St Mary	Hinckley and Bosworth	Parish Church	Early 14th century	8 March 1963	SP4271393823; 52°32′26″N 1°22′18″W	1361297	Church of the Assumption of St Mary More images
The Great Meeting	Hinckley, Hinckley and Bosworth	Unitarian Chapel	1722	8 March 1963	SP4263494104; 52°32′35″N 1°22′22″W	1295167	Upload Photo
