= Kendall's Meadow =

Protected area in Leicestershire, England

Coordinates: 52.578°N 1.421°W

- Site of Special Scientific Interest
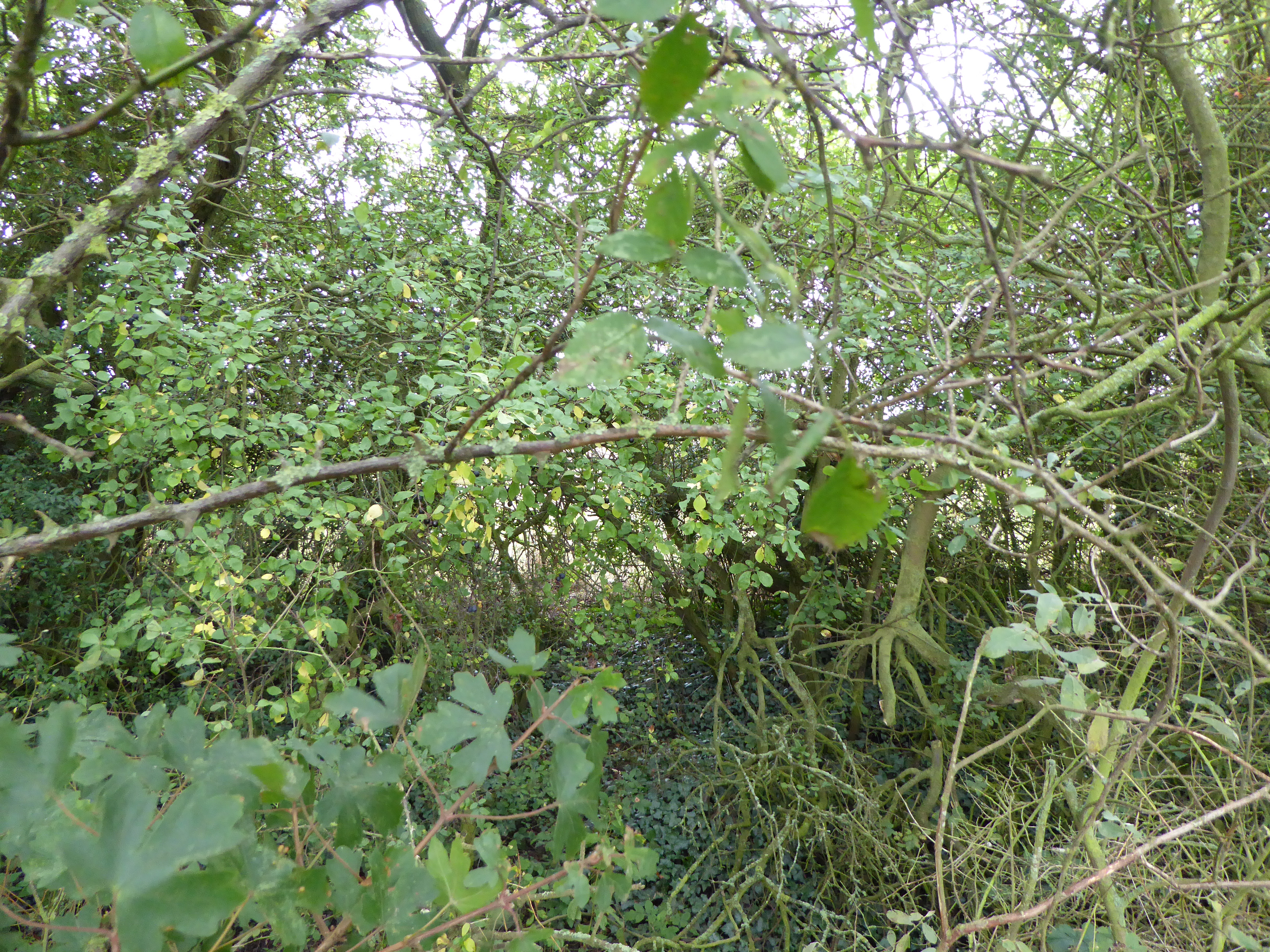
- Location of Kendall's Meadow.
- Area of search: Leicestershire
- Grid reference: SP 393 980
- Interest: Biological
- Area: 2.7 hectares
- Notification date: 1985
- Location map: Magic Map

Kendall's Meadow is a 2.7-hectare (6.7-acre) biological Site of Special Scientific Interest north of Stoke Golding in Leicestershire.

Over a dozen grass species grow on this traditionally managed hay meadow, such as common bent, red fescue, crested dog's tail and yellow oat grass. There are also many herbs including cat's ear and yellow rattle.

The site is private land with no public access.
