= William Pratt (cricketer) =

English cricketer

Personal information
- Full name: William Ewart Pratt
- Born: 2 July 1895; Hinckley, Leicestershire, England
- Died: 27 May 1974 (aged 78); Leicester, Leicestershire, England
- Batting: Right-handed
- Bowling: Unknown

Domestic team information
- Years: Team
- 1920–1930: Leicestershire

Career statistics
Competition	First-class
Matches	9
Runs scored	166
Batting average	10.37
100s/50s	–/–
Top score	29*
Balls bowled	72
Wickets	–
Bowling average	–
5 wickets in innings	–
10 wickets in match	–
Best bowling	–
Catches/stumpings	2/–
- Source: Cricinfo, 7 February 2013

William Ewart Pratt (2 July 1895 – 27 May 1974) was an English cricketer. Pratt was a right-handed batsman, although his bowling style is unknown. He was born at Hinckley, Leicestershire.

Pratt made his first-class debut for Leicestershire against Warwickshire in the 1920 County Championship at Ashby Road, Hinckley. The following season he made a further six first-class appearances in the 1922 County Championship, before making two further appearances in the 1930 County Championship against Somerset and Warwickshire. In his total of nine first-class matches, Pratt scored 166 runs at an average of 10.37, with a high score of 29 not out.

He died at Leicester, Leicestershire on 27 May 1974.
