= Robert Chessher =

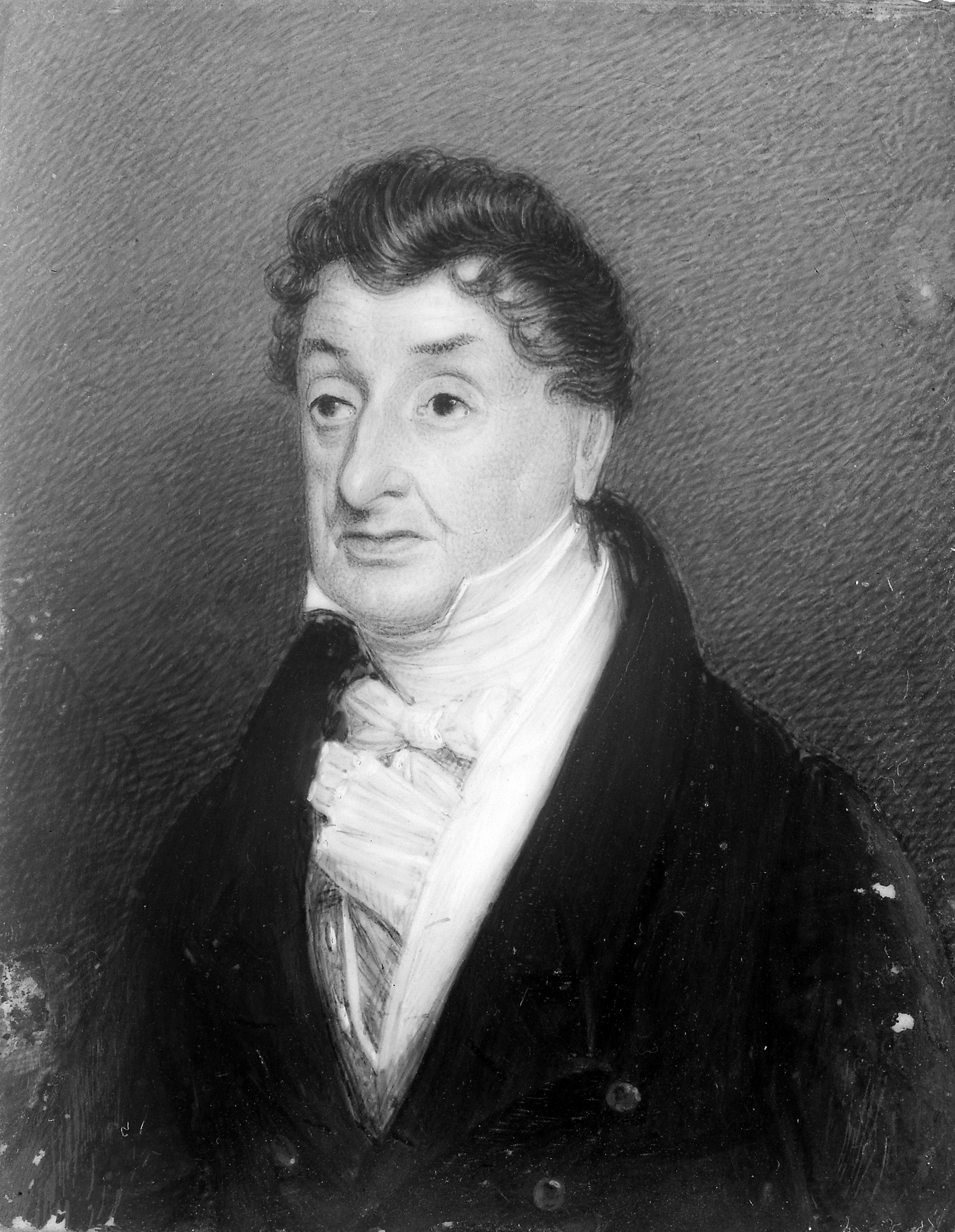
- Born: 1750; Hinckley, Leicestershire, England
- Died: 31 January 1831 (aged 80–81); Hinckley, Leicestershire, England
- Education: Bosworth School
- Occupation: Orthopedist
- Known for: Inventing the double-inclined plane for bone fractures
- Relatives: Whalley (stepfather)

Robert Chessher (1750–1831) was the first British Orthopedist. He invented the double-inclined plane to help in the treatment of lower-body bone fractures.

== Life ==
Chessher was born in Hinckley in Leicestershire, in 1750. His father died during his infancy, and his mother married a surgeon named Whalley, residing also at Hinckley; and to him, after education at Bosworth school, young Chessher was apprenticed.

He early showed aptitude for improvising supports for fractured limbs, especially for the purpose of obviating contraction of muscles and skin. At the age of eighteen he became a pupil of Dr. Denman, the eminent London accoucheur, attending William Hunter's and Fordyce's lectures. He afterwards became house surgeon to the Middlesex Hospital, but before long returned to Hinckley, on his stepfather's death, and remained there, unmarried, during the remainder of his life, resisting solicitations to return to London. He died on 31 January 1831.

== Work ==
Chessher was a very ingenious mechanician, employing a mechanic named Reeves to carry out his ideas. After 1790 he applied a double-inclined plane to support fractured legs with great success. He invented several instruments for supporting weak spines and for relieving the spinal column from the weight of the head, and for applying gentle steady friction to contracted limbs or muscles. It is to be regretted that his manuscript cases were not published, but his retiring manners prevented his merits from being fully known. His personal character appears to have been most estimable.

== Sources ==
- Leonard F. Peltier. Fractures: A History and Iconography of Their Treatment. p. 35.
