= Castle Mead Radio =

Radio station in Hinckley, Leicestershire, England

Hinckley, Leicestershire; England
- Broadcast area: Hinckley Hospital, Sunnyside Hospital
- Branding: CMR

Programming
- Language: English
- Format: General Music

History
- First air date: 9 November 1990

Technical information
- Transmitter coordinates: 52.63122°N 1.15668°W

Links
- Website: castlemeadradio.co.uk

Castle Mead Radio is a hospital radio station broadcasting to Hinckley and Sunnyside Hospitals in Hinckley, Leicestershire, England. It provides music, talk and entertainment to staff, patients and visitors. It has been broadcasting since late 1990. In 2011 to mark its 21st birthday began broadcasting on the internet.
