= Upton, Leicestershire =

Hamlet in Leicestershire, England

Coordinates: 52.593°N 1.465°W

Upton
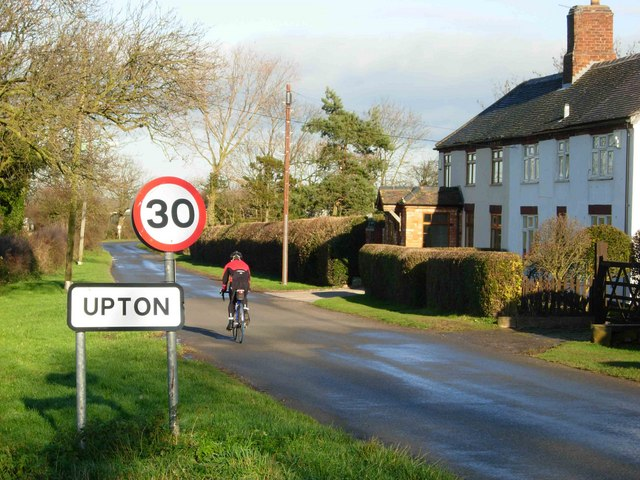

- Location within Leicestershire
- Civil parish: Sheepy
- District: Hinckley and Bosworth
- Shire county: Leicestershire
- Region: East Midlands
- Country: England
- Sovereign state: United Kingdom
- Post town: NUNEATON
- Postcode district: CV13
- Dialling code: 01455

Upton, is a small hamlet and former civil parish, now in the parish of Sheepy, in the Hinckley and Bosworth district of Leicestershire, England. It is on the Leicestershire and Warwickshire border west of Shenton and south-east of Sibson. In 1931 the parish had a population of 104.

The local area is predominantly agricultural. Upton is a ribbon development with a mixture of Georgian, Victorian and more modern properties along Main Road. There is a caravan park and restaurant both operated by Upton Barn. The hamlet has one post box.

Administratively, Upton falls under Hinckley and Bosworth Borough Council and Leicestershire County Council

== History ==
Upton was formerly a township in the parish of Sibson, from 1866 Upton was a civil parish in its own right, on 1 April 1935 the parish was abolished to form Sheepy.

== Longhorn Cattle in Upton ==
In 1745, George Chapman following the work of Robert Bakewell (farmer) started a Longhorn cattle herd in Upton that proved prize winning and influential over the development of the breed during this period. The Chapman family continued breeding Longhorns into the mid 19th century

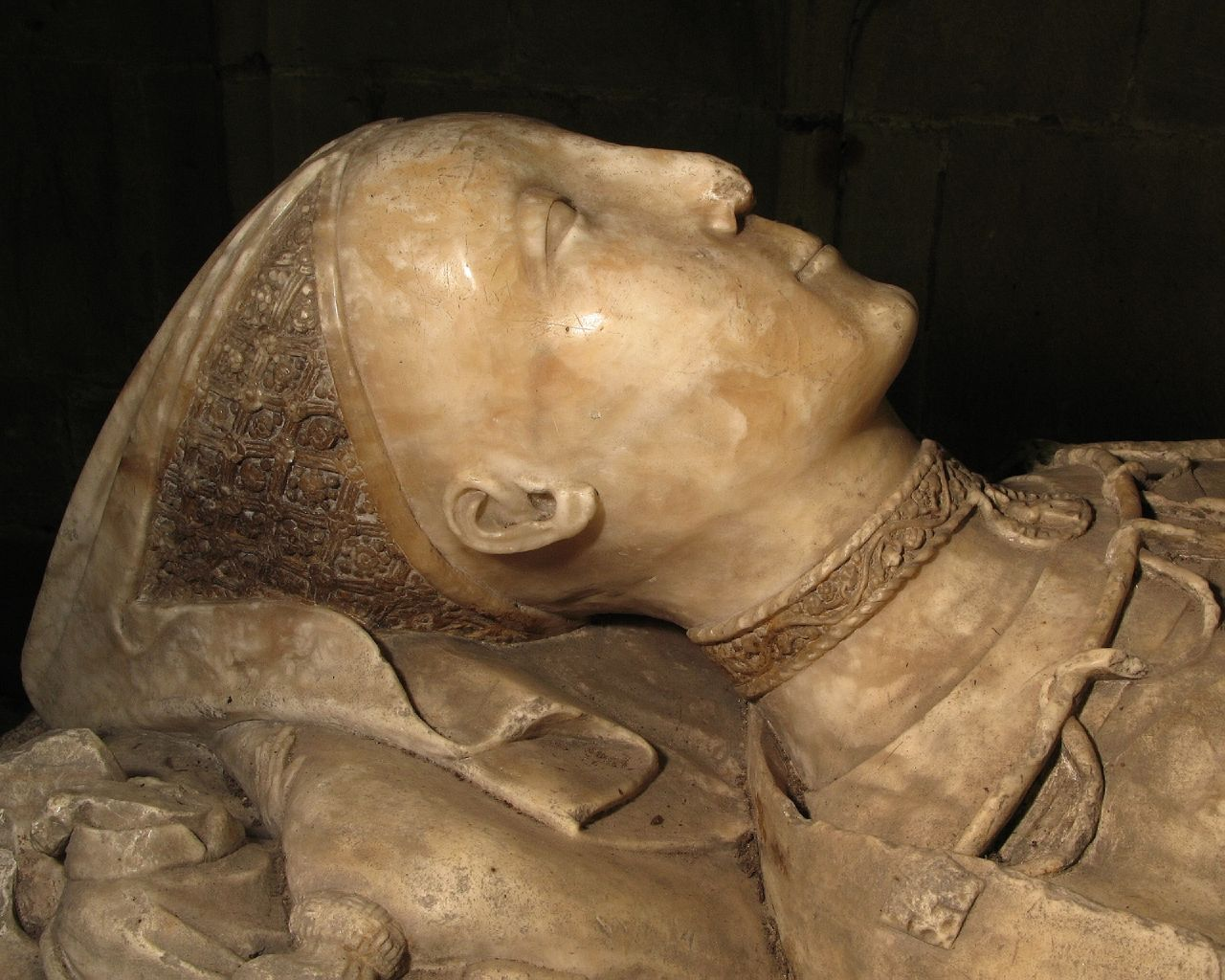
Elizabeth Marshall, heiress of Upton, married Ralph Fitzherbert in the 16th century.

== Cheese in Upton ==
Red Leicestershire cheese is made in Upton by the Leicestershire Handmade Cheese Co. The cheese is marketed under the ‘Sparkenhoe’ name. Cheese making began in November 2005. Sparkenhoe was the name of one of the Longhorn bulls bred by the Chapman family.
