= Sibson, Leicestershire =

Village in Leicestershire, England

Coordinates: 52.604794°N 1.478004°W

Sibson
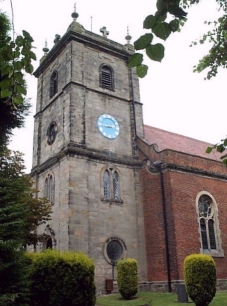
- Parish church of Saint Botolph

- Location within Leicestershire
- Civil parish: Sheepy
- District: Hinckley and Bosworth
- Shire county: Leicestershire
- Region: East Midlands
- Country: England
- Sovereign state: United Kingdom
- Post town: Nuneaton
- Postcode district: CV13
- Dialling code: 01827
- Police: Leicestershire
- Fire: Leicestershire
- Ambulance: East Midlands
- UK Parliament: Hinckley and Bosworth

Sibson (otherwise Sibstone or Sibston) is a village and former civil parish, now in the parish of Sheepy, in the Hinckley and Bosworth district, in western Leicestershire, England, close to the border with North Warwickshire. It is situated approximately midway between the towns of Hinckley and Measham, and slightly northeast of Atherstone. In 1931 the parish had a population of 264.

== History ==
The manor of Sibson, also called Sibetesdone or Sibbesdon, was part of John le Poter's inheritance in the time of Henry I. It changed hands several times over the centuries, passing to Thomas Corbett of Legh in 1420, and Keytes of Gloucestershire, in the early 17th century. The ancient parish of Sibson included the chapelry of Upton. In 1866 Sibson and Upton became separate civil parishes. In 1935 the civil parish of Sibson merged with the civil parishes of Upton, Sheepy Magna and Sheepy Parva to form the new civil parish of Sheepy.

=== The Civil War ===
During the English Civil War Sibson made a number of claims for losses and "free quarter" from the local parliamentary garrisons. In June 1646, William Mousley and William King claimed for lost horses taken by soldiers from the Tamworth garrison. Colonel Purefoy from the Coventry garrison extorted money and "provinder". As many as 44 soldiers under the command of Colonel Cheshire from the Warwick garrison were quartered here for nearly two weeks on one occasion. Sibson is also notable as the birthplace of Peter Temple, a regicide, born here 1599 and apprenticed to a linen draper.*

=== Population ===
The national census of 1801 records that the village had a population of 45 families, comprising 220 people, mostly employed in agriculture. In 1803 about 740 acres (3.0 km^{2}) in the parish was enclosed by Pendock Neale, the lord of the manor, leaving a proportion to the rector, Thomas Neale "equal to the value of his uninclosed glebe and right of common". In 1810 the manor of Sibson with 880 acres (3.6 km^{2}) of freehold enclosed land and the advowson of the rectory, a newly erected rectory-house, coach-house, stables, and yards, altogether worth about a thousand pounds was offered for sale.

== The parish Church ==
An engraved illustration of the church from 1793 printed by John Nichols, shows the rectory and perhaps one of Pendock Neale's tenants carting hay.
