= Joseph Nutt =

Joseph Nutt (c. 1700 – 16 October 1775) was an English surveyor of highways, born in Hinckley, Leicestershire. After studying medicine in London, he returned to Hinckley to practice as a doctor. He became popular in his local community for his frequent practice of treating poor people free of charge. When later he was elected surveyor of highways for the parish, Nutt came up with a method of flooding the highways in order to produce more solid ground. In spite of initial resistance, the new method met with success. John Dyer, Nutt's friend, wrote about him in the poem The Fleece.

In 1774, Nutt married Susannah Goode (1714–1799). He died at Hinckley the next year.
