= St Martin's Catholic Academy =

St. Martin's Catholic Academy

Location
- Stoke Golding; Nuneaton, Warwickshire, CV13 6BF; England; 52°34′18″N 1°24′03″W

Information
- Type: Academy
- Motto: Veritas (Truth)
- Religious affiliation: Roman Catholic
- Established: 1948
- Department for Education URN: 138290 Tables
- Ofsted: Reports
- Principal: Clive Wright
- Gender: Coeducational
- Age: 11 to 16
- Enrolment: 775 (2025)
- Houses: Biblical places associated with Mary: Bethlehem; Cana; Hebron; Jerusalem; Nazareth
- Twitter: @stmartin1963
- Website: http://www.saint-martins.net

Saint Martin's Catholic Academy (formerly Saint Martin's Catholic High School) is a coeducational 11-16 Roman Catholic secondary school located in Stoke Golding, near to Hinckley, Leicestershire, England. It is part of the Diocese of Nottingham, and is built on the same grounds as the former Dominican nunnery.

== History ==
Saint Martin's was originally established in 1948 by the Dominican Sisters of St. Catherine of Siena based in King William's Town, South Africa as an independent girls' school, Blessed Martin in the Fields at Stoke Lodge, Stoke Golding. This branch of the Dominican order was founded in 1877 by a group of women from Augsburg in Germany. Although now a state funded Catholic academy, the school grounds and buildings are still owned by the Dominicans.

The site of Stoke Lodge convent was adjacent to the current school site. The current school building was constructed in 1963. Due to poor condition of the old Lodge, it was demolished in 1971 and the convent was rebuilt. The convent chapel was dedicated to The Holy Spirit and St Martin. The convent finally closed in 2011 and the land sold for housing.

The current school site retains a significant area of the former grounds of the Lodge; many of the old trees on the site give evidence of its former landscape.

The school itself is named after Saint Martín de Porres, a Dominican saint from Lima in Peru.

In 1963 Saint Martin's became a Voluntary Aided Co-ed Catholic School and in 2014 it converted to an Academy, part of the St Dominic's Multi-Academy Trust. This Trust was incorporated into the St Thomas Aquinas Catholic Multi-Academy Trust in 2018, a federation incorporating all the state-funded Catholic Schools in Leicestershire.

== Notable alumni ==
- Dean Richards – Former England international rugby union player and coach; number eight for Leicester Tigers, England and the British & Irish Lions.
- Stacey Foster – Midlands Correspondent, ITV News.
- Salvatore Scarpa – Actor, writer and film producer.
- Max Burgoyne-Moore – Film editor, director and writer.
- Harry Yorke – Deputy Political Editor at *The Sunday Times*.
- Amy Payne (née Harris) – British journalist; reporter and presenter for *BBC East Midlands Today*.

== Gallery ==
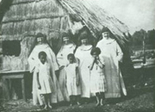

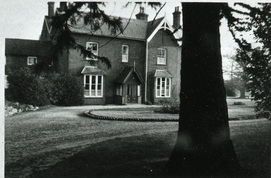
St Martin in the Fields Convent School

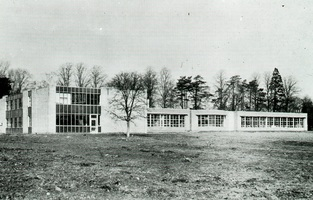
The new Building circa 1963

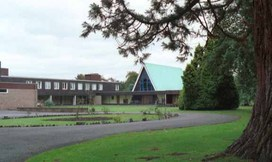
The new convent that replaced the old lodge.

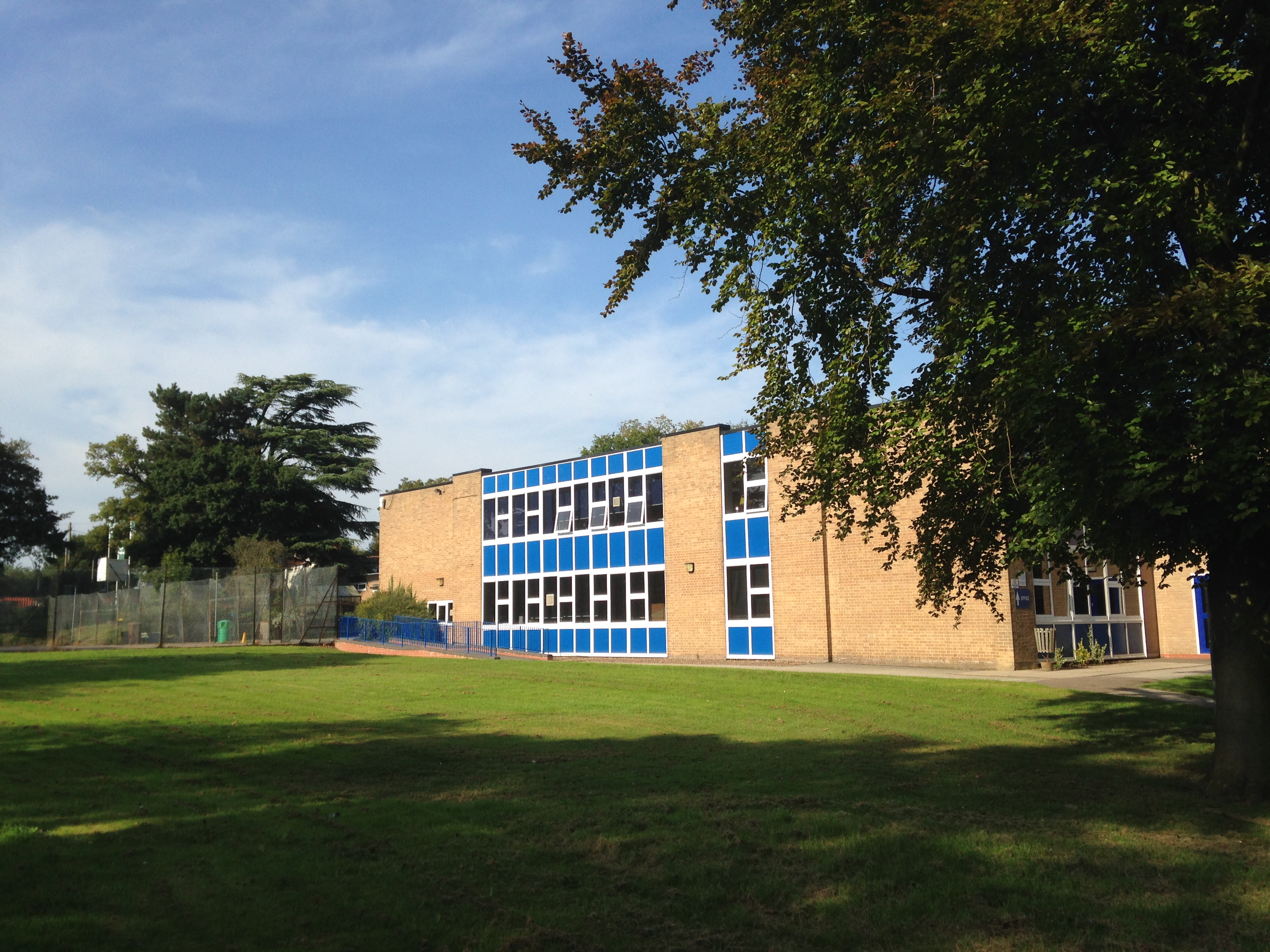
The school building

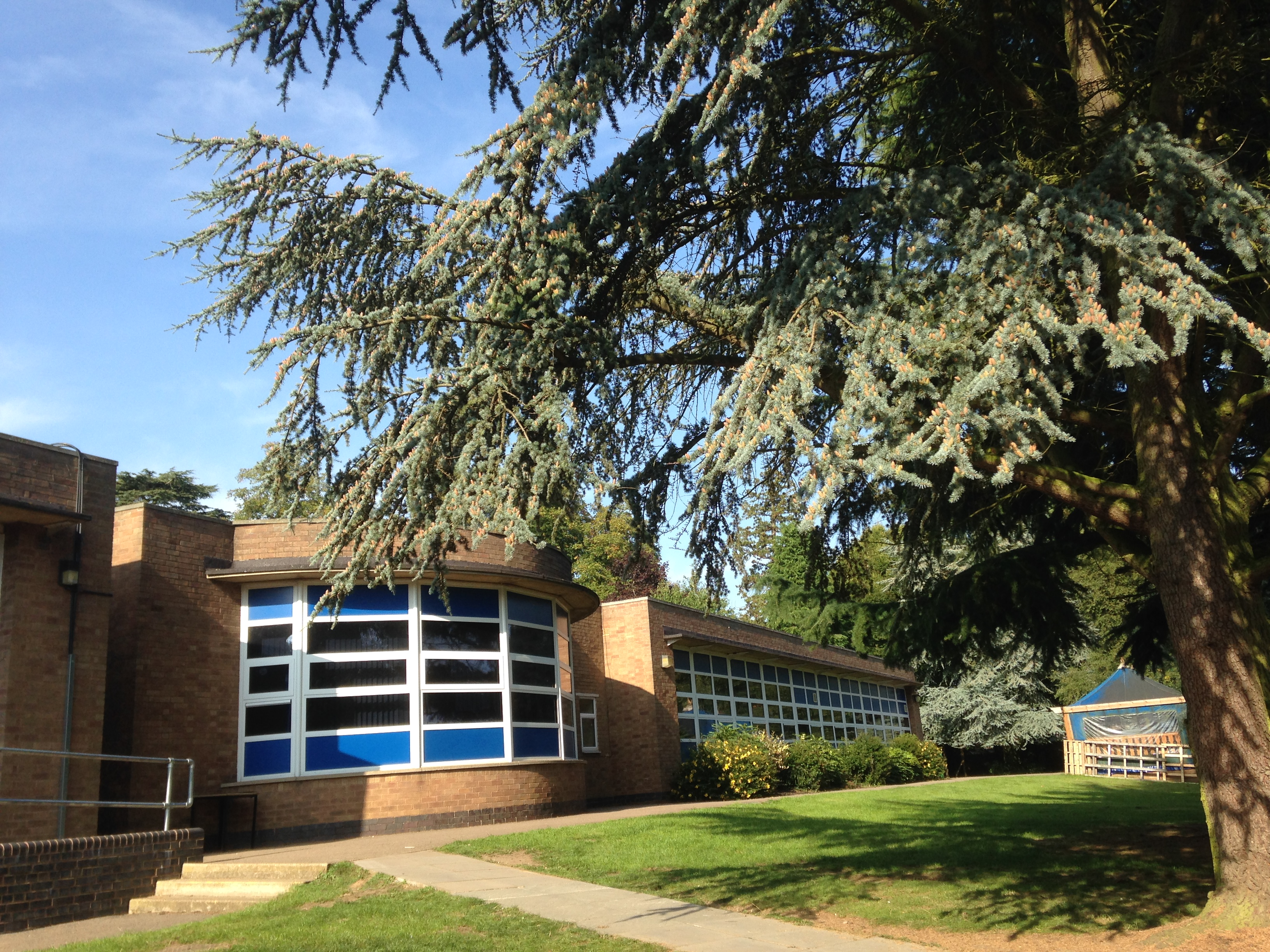
