= Sheepy =

Civil parish in Leicestershire, England

Coordinates: 52.610°N 1.521°W

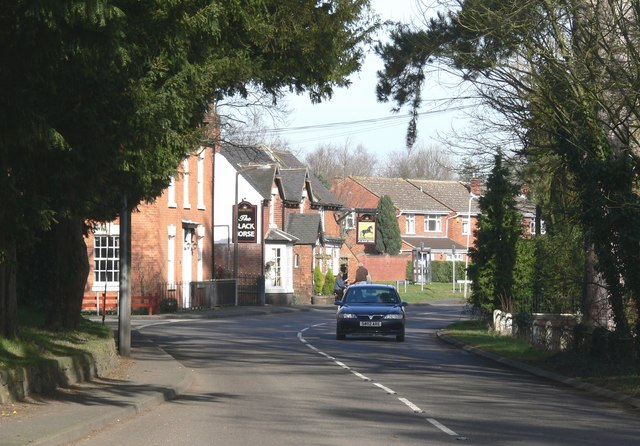
- Sheepy Magna

- Location within Leicestershire
- Population: 1,174 (2011)
- OS grid reference: SK3201
- Civil parish: Sheepy
- District: Hinckley and Bosworth
- Shire county: Leicestershire
- Region: East Midlands
- Country: England
- Sovereign state: United Kingdom
- Post town: ATHERSTONE
- Postcode district: CV9
- Dialling code: 01827
- Police: Leicestershire
- Fire: Leicestershire
- Ambulance: East Midlands
- UK Parliament: Hinckley and Bosworth

Sheepy is a civil parish in the Borough of Hinckley and Bosworth in Leicestershire, England. It contains the villages of Sheepy Magna, Sheepy Parva, Sibson, Wellsborough, Upton, Pinwall and Cross Hands—collectively 449 homes. At the 2001 census, the parish had a population of 1,192, including Orton on the Hill but falling slightly to 1,174 at the 2011 census.

== History ==
The parish was created in 1935 from the merger of the four civil parishes of Sheepy Magna, Sheepy Parva, Sibson and Upton.

Sheepy was mentioned in the Domesday Book of 1086 as comprising 14 households. It was recorded as lying within the hundred of Guthlaxton and the county of Leicestershire.

During the English Civil War, Sheepy provided free quarter and horses to troops from the parliamentary garrisons from north Warwickshire. In June 1646, Gregory Kent, the parish clerk, submitted a claim for losses to the Warwickshire County Committee, including claims for free quarter for about a hundred horses and men under the command of Captain Flower and Captain Ottway of the Coventry garrison. Mr Burbidge, and Captain Turton were charged with taking a mare worth £6.13.4. The offender was probably Richard Burbidge, garrison quartermaster at Edgbaston Hall under Colonel Tinker Fox. At the siege of Tamworth, soldiers under the command of Captain Castleton apparently made off with valuable horses belonging to Thomas Owen, John Thurman, John Vincent, John Toon and Mr Kent, the town clerk.

== Community ==
The Anglican parish church in Sheepy Magna is All Saints while the parish church in Sibson is St Botolph's church. These churches, along with other nearby churches form the Sheepy Benefice. All Saints in Sheepy Magna probably pre-dates 1150, although the present church building was rebuilt in 1778 on the site of the earlier building.

There are many groups running in the community including Cubs, Scouts, Beavers, Rainbows, Brownies, Inspirations Choir, School PTA, Mother's Union, WI, Local History, Fruit and Vegetable Society, Playing field committee and Sheepy Bonfire Society NHW.

The Memorial Hall is charity run and Thomas Leaving Charity provides two houses on Twitchell Lane.
