= Stoke Golding =

Village in Leicestershire, England

Coordinates: 52.5706°N 1.4147°W

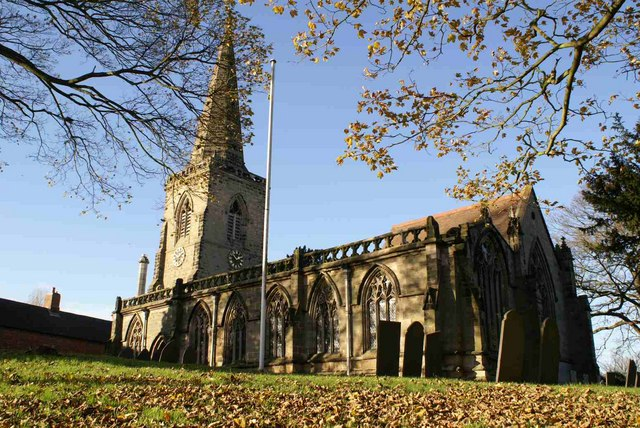
- Parish church of Saint Margaret

- Location within Leicestershire
- Population: 1,684 (2011)
- OS grid reference: SP399973 Stoke Golding
- District: Hinckley and Bosworth
- Shire county: Leicestershire
- Region: East Midlands
- Country: England
- Sovereign state: United Kingdom
- Post town: NUNEATON
- Postcode district: CV13
- Dialling code: 01455
- Police: Leicestershire
- Fire: Leicestershire
- Ambulance: East Midlands
- UK Parliament: Hinckley and Bosworth

Stoke Golding is a village and civil parish in the Hinckley and Bosworth district of Leicestershire, England, close to the county border with Warwickshire. According to the 2001 census, the total population was 1,721 in just over 700 houses. The population at the 2011 census was 1,684 in 723 households. The village is 15 miles (24 km) from the city of Leicester, about 3 miles (4.8 km) northwest of Hinckley and 4.5 miles (7.2 km) northeast of Nuneaton. The village is bordered on the west by the Ashby Canal, well-used for recreational purposes.

== History ==
Stoke Golding's unique historical claim to fame is that, in 1485, the people of the village witnessed the unofficial rural coronation of Henry VII, the first Tudor monarch. His defeat of Richard III, last of the Plantagenets, at the Battle of Bosworth Field marked the end of the Wars of the Roses, and heralded the accession to the throne of the Tudor dynasty. In so doing, Stoke Golding claims to be the birthplace of the Tudor dynasty.

After Henry Tudor was victorious over Richard III at the Battle of Bosworth Field, which took place in the marshland known as the Redemore between Stoke Golding, Dadlington, Shenton and Sutton Cheney, Henry's entourage retired to hilly ground near the village of Stoke Golding. Here, Henry's impromptu coronation was performed with a circlet, by tradition retrieved from a nearby thorn bush. This area became known as Crown Hill and Crownhill Field.

Local historical accounts of the Battle of Bosworth Field tell of the villagers climbing onto the battlements of the church of St Margaret of Antioch to view the bloody battle on 22 August 1485. The windowsills of the church show grooves which, legend has it, were caused by the soldiers sharpening their swords and axes on the eve of the battle. After the fighting, large pits were dug around Stoke Golding and the villages of Dadlington and Fenny Drayton, the nearest villages to the battlefield, for the burial of the dead. Henry then rewarded some of his followers and knighted the more senior of his supporters.

== Facilities ==
Stoke Golding has an impressive grade I listed Saxon church, that of St Margaret of Antioch, a Church of England church in the Diocese of Leicester. The church is roughly in the centre of the village and is a good example of the churches of that period. There is a Methodist church in the village that was first opened in 1857.

Transport facilities include a local hourly bus (except Sundays) to Nuneaton and Hinckley.

Stoke Golding once had a railway station, on the Ashby and Nuneaton Joint Railway, closed to passengers in 1931.

=== Schools ===
The primary school children (4 to 11 years) of Stoke Golding and nearby villages mostly attend St Margaret's Church of England Primary School, located next to the church within the village. St Martin's Catholic Academy is a secondary school located in the village.

== Sport ==
A short lived greyhound racing track was opened on 19 April 1930. The racing was independent (not affiliated to the sport's governing body, the National Greyhound Racing Club) and was known as a flapping track, the nickname given to independent tracks. The racing was run by the Stoke Golding Greyhound Association and the main race distance was 450 yards (410 m).

== Notable people ==
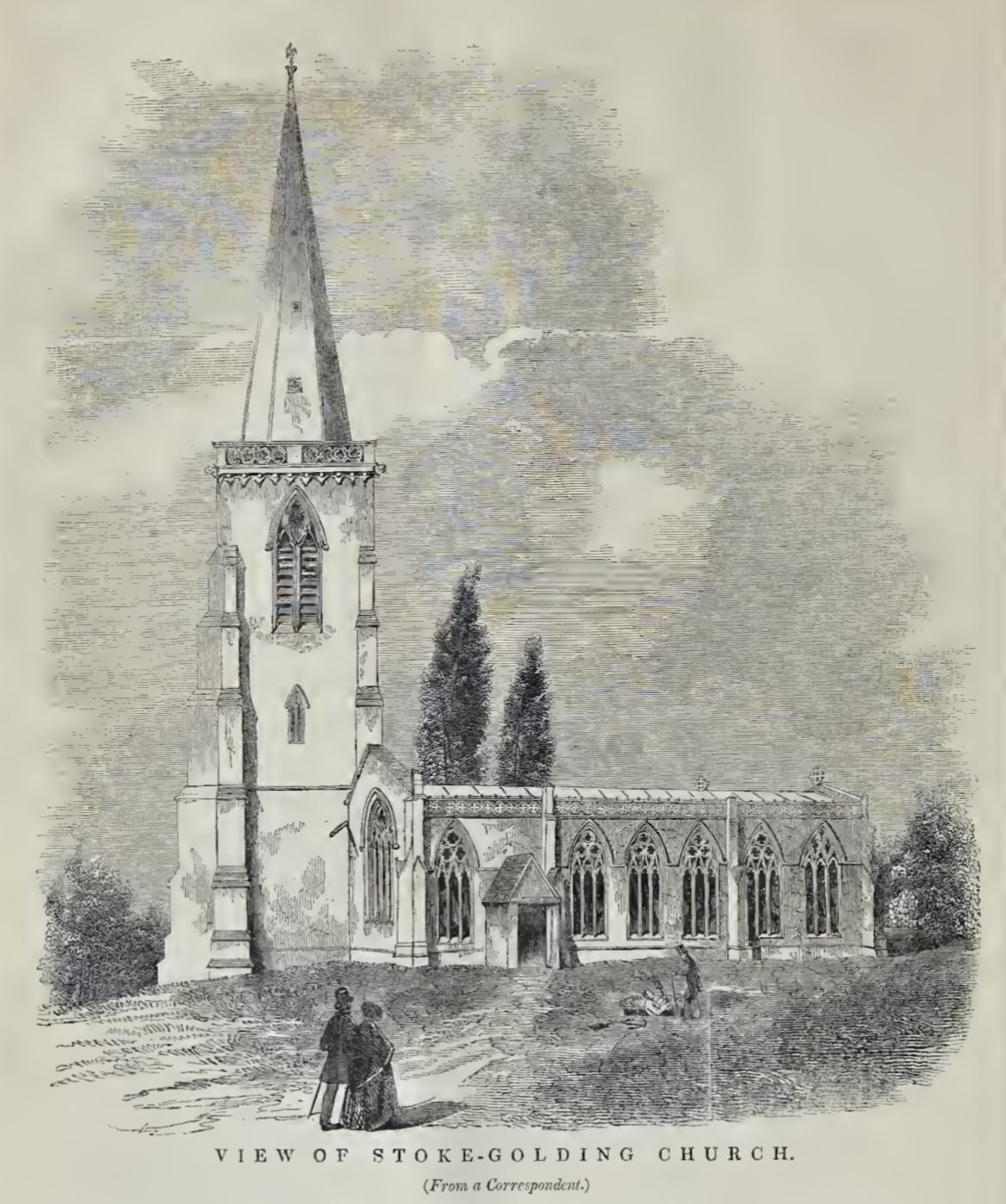
Illustration of the parish church of Saint Margaret, Stoke Golding, Leicestershire, 1844

- Francis Brokesby
- Martine Croxall, news presenter on BBC News
- Rex Malcolm Chaplin Dawson FRS, biochemist
- Sir William Edge, 1st Baronet
- Sir Henry Firebrace
