= St Mary's Church, Hinckley =

Coordinates: 52.5426°N 1.3753°W

St Mary's Parish Church, Hinckley
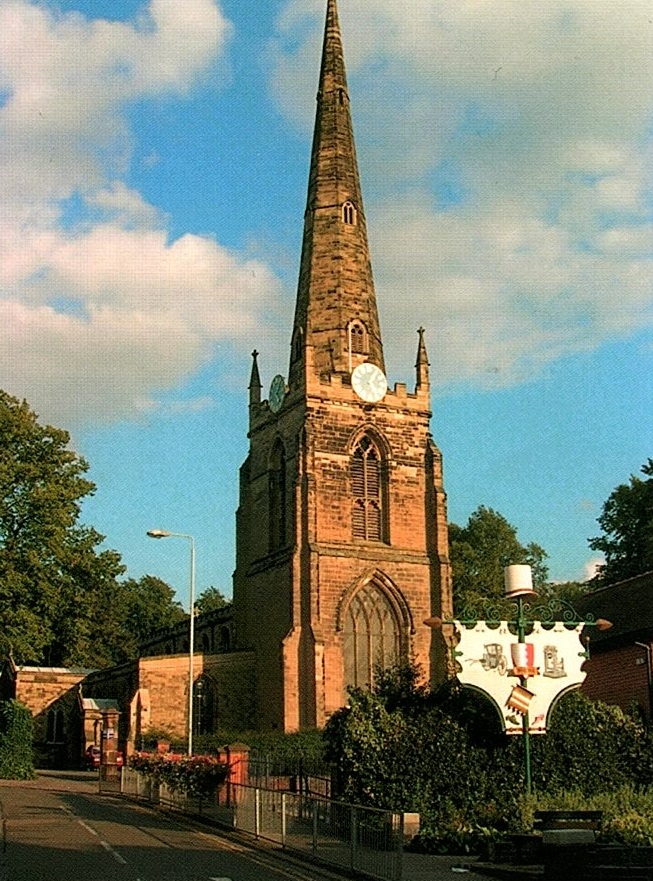
- St Mary's Church, Hinckley

- Location in Hinckley
- OS grid reference: SP 42713 93823
- Location: Hinckley, Leicestershire
- Country: England
- Denomination: Anglican

History
- Status: Parish church
- Dedication: Saint Mary

Architecture
- Functional status: Active
- Heritage designation: Grade II*
- Architect: William FitzOsbern
- Architectural type: Church

Administration
- Province: Canterbury
- Diocese: Leicester
- Archdeaconry: Loughborough
- Parish: St Mary's Parish

St Mary's Parish Church is the oldest building in Hinckley, and is situated in central Hinckley. It is an Anglican Parish Church in the Diocese of Leicester and is designated by Historic England as a Grade II* listed building. In addition, the North Chapel of the Church has been converted into a coffee bar.

== Brief history ==
St Mary's parish church in Hinckley was dedicated in the Middle Ages to the Assumption of Saint Mary the Virgin. This church building has stood on the site for almost nine hundred years, although there may well have been a church already on the site, as the remnants of an Anglo-Saxon sun-dial is visible on the diagonal buttress on the south-east corner of the chancel. The church was built by William FitzOsbern, who came over with William the Conqueror.

== 1066 – 1926 ==
A parish church has stood in this site for over 900 years. F.C Bedford, who wrote a guide to St Mary's in 1936, says, `It is generally agreed among historians that a Saxon church existed at one time in Hinckley'. The name Hinckley is Anglo-Saxon: 'Hinck' is someone's name, and 'ley' is a meadow. So if there was an Anglo-Saxon settlement here, it is fairly safe to assume that there would have been a church building. The church's income was granted by its founder, William FitzOsbern, to the Abbey of Lyre in Normandy, and the connection with this Norman abbey continued intermittently until 1415 when the revenue was finally transferred to the Priory of Mount Grace in Yorkshire. (This piece of history explains the name given to Mount Grace High School, Leicester Road, Hinckley, which is built on land once owned by the church).

When Henry VIII dissolved the monasteries in 1542 he gave the former estates of Mount Grace Priory in Hinckley, together with the patronage (the right to appoint the vicar) of St Mary's to the Dean and Chapter of Westminster Abbey. The Dean and Chapter kept the patronage until 1874 when it was transferred to the Bishop of Peterborough. When Leicester became a separate diocese in 1926 it was taken over by the Bishop of Leicester, who remains the patron to this day.

A Benedictine priory was founded in Hinckley in the eleventh century. The old priory building, which was on the south side of the church (where the present St Mary's Church Community Hall is) survived until 1827 when it was demolished, to make way for cottages (Hunter's Row). These were demolished in 1912.

== Present building ==
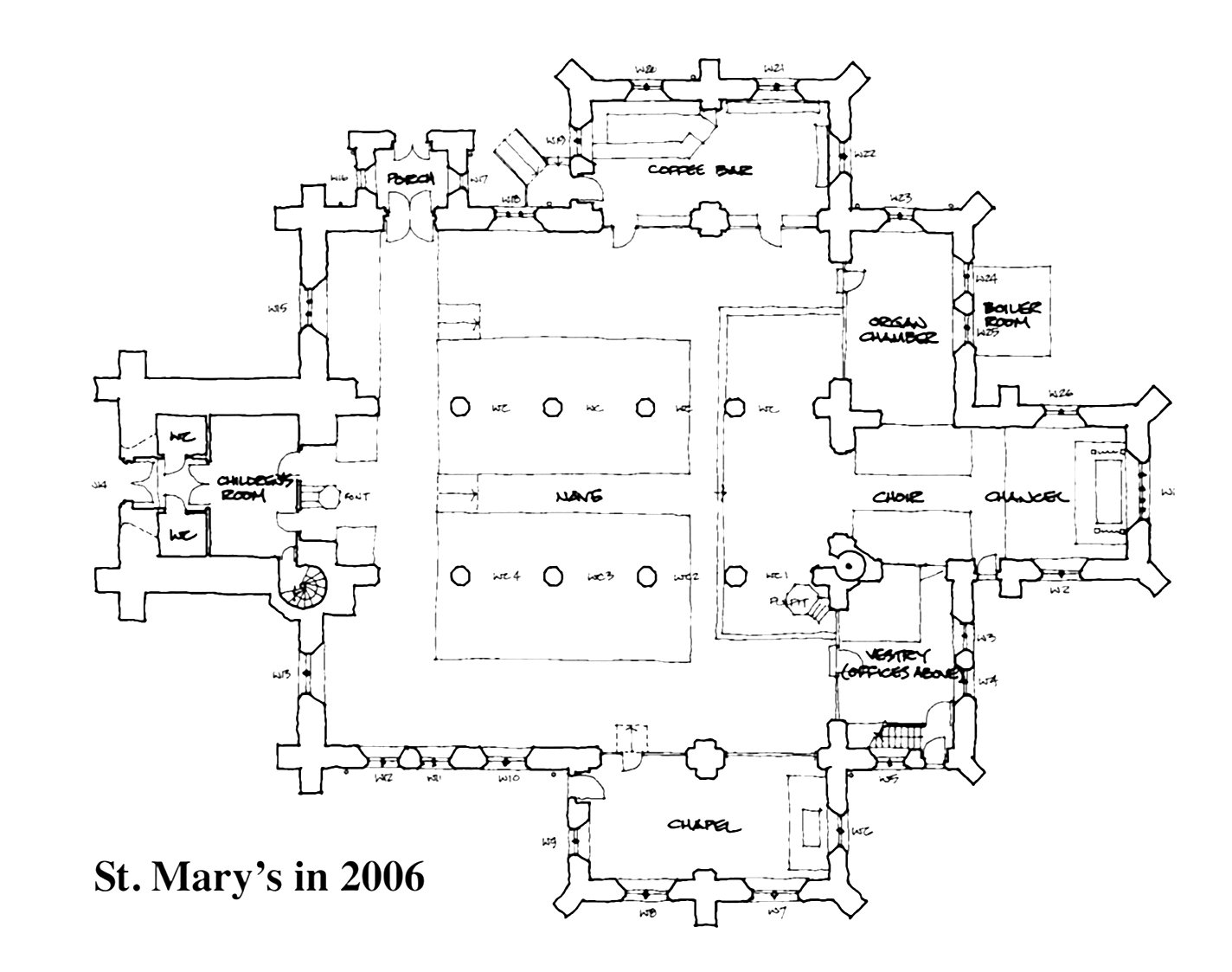
The layout of St Mary's Church, Hinckley, 2006

The present church was rebuilt in the thirteenth century. A beam found during the Victorian rebuilding was inscribed with the date 1246. The oldest parts of the church you see today date from the thirteenth and fourteenth centuries – roughly 1240 to 1400. These are the tower, nave and chancel.

A large scale restoration took place between 1875 and 1878, at a cost of £10,000 (in today's money about £10,000,000, if you take into account an average working man's wage). The architect was Ewan Christian. The vicar was Rev W.H. Disney, who spent ten years at Hinckley (1874 -1884). He wrote about his time in Hinckley in his autobiography, Incidents during Thirty Years Clerical Work in Ireland and England (published 1898). He begins his account of his ministry in Hinckley: `My health is now broken. The nervous system gave way under the strain of ten years' unceasing work in a manufacturing town in Leicestershire'. There is a plaque in memory of Rev. W.H. Disney on the south wall of the Chancel in the church.

The old north and south aisles and transepts were demolished in 1875, along with the great west singing gallery or singing loft, erected 1723. This gallery projected two bays towards the east. There were also galleries in the north and south aisles, which were also demolished. The poor used to be herded into the north gallery, which was filled with benches seating 360. New and larger aisles and transepts were built. When completed there was seating for 1,200 people, all on oak pews. Each transept had its own door so that the children could enter and leave without disturbing the rest of the congregation! The chancel was restored and re-roofed in 1880. A lot of the stone used by the Victorians in the 1875/78 restoration was of poor quality, and has had to be replaced over the years.

== Restoration 1993 – 2006 ==
Extensive restoration work was carried out to the spire and tower in 1993 & 1994. The top twelve feet of the spire was completely rebuilt, with much new stone. The south west pinnacle was rebuilt, and some of the decorative work on the tower renewed. The north stone spitter (or spout to throw water away from the tower) was completely renewed, and the underside carved with a likeness of the vicar. Several other areas of stonework were restored including much of the parapet on the two gables of the Lady Chapel and elsewhere.

Further restoration was carried out in 1998–9. Among other work, the south east buttress to the vestry was underpinned and rebuilt, and the upper half of the east wall of the Lady Chapel (1999) had to be completely rebuilt. Early in 2006 a lot of crumbling stonework was replaced – in the eastern section of the north aisle. In particular fine new stone was added to the buttress at the north west corner of the north aisle, and the north west corner of the north transept. Also the whole of the interior was redecorated areas were re-plastered, and repairs carried out to several window sills. The total cost was about £35,000.

== Exterior ==
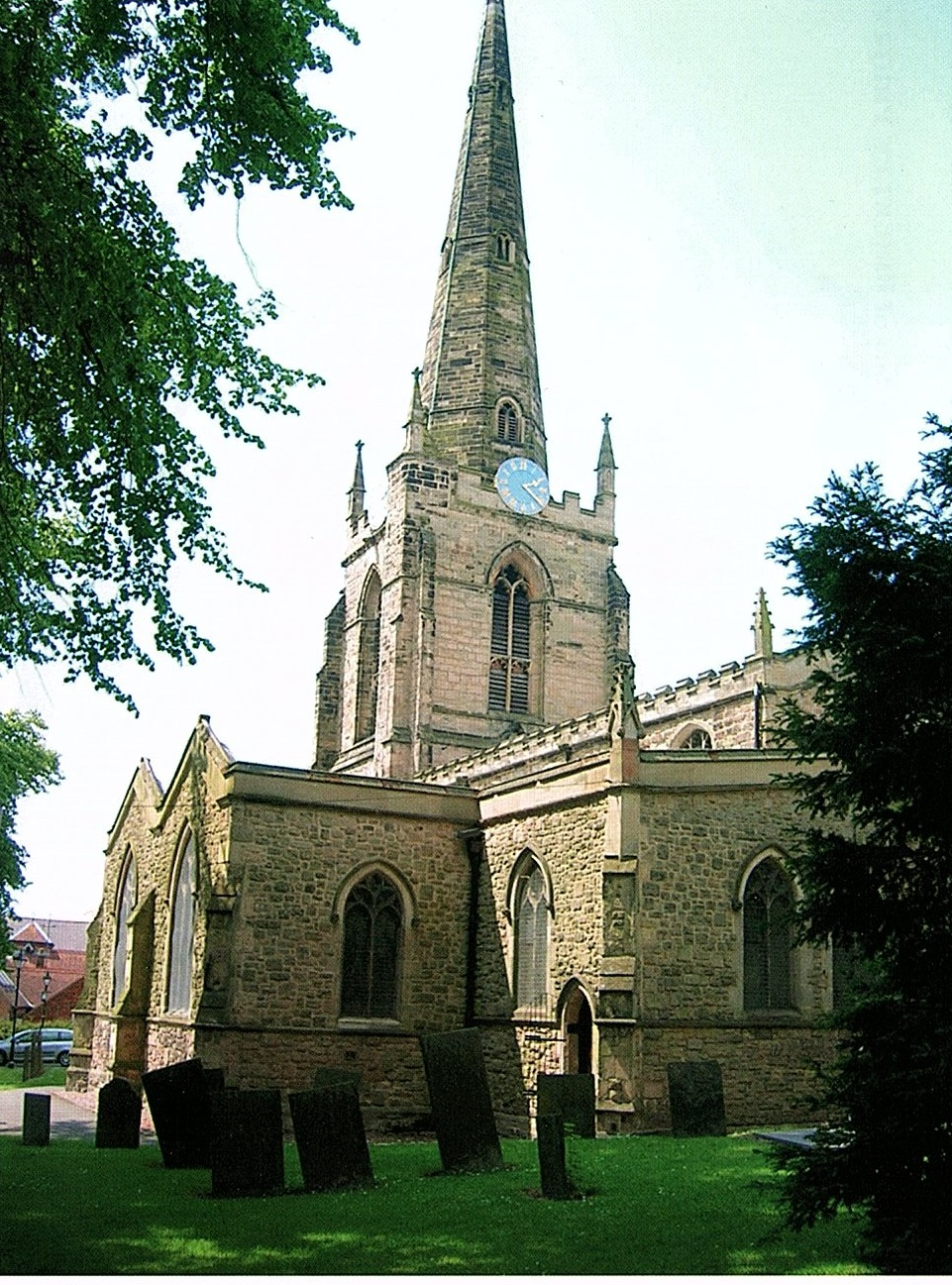
St Mary's Church, Hinckley, from south=east

The outstanding feature of the church is undoubtedly the tower (25.3 metres) and spire (a further 30 .5 metres) which can be seen for miles around. This massive tower, whose walls are 1.7m thick, was built in the early fourteenth century. The large western window was added in the fifteenth century. The stone surrounding the west door was restored in 1895.

The tower has battlements with angle pinnacles. It is supported by eight buttresses set in pairs at the angles, each having four stages. At the south-east comer of the tower is a stone winding staircase which gives access to the battlements and a splendid view of the town, and far off Coventry. The spire was erected in 1788, replacing an earlier one which had been badly damaged two years previously by storms and lightning.

The copper weathercock is 63.5 cm high, 95.25 cm long and weighs 5 kg, and was made for the new spire in 1788, and is inscribed with the name of the vicar, John Cole Galloway. (Re-gilded 1994)

The walls of the nave are thirteenth century but the battlements with crocketted pinnacles at the comers are Victorian.

== Interior ==
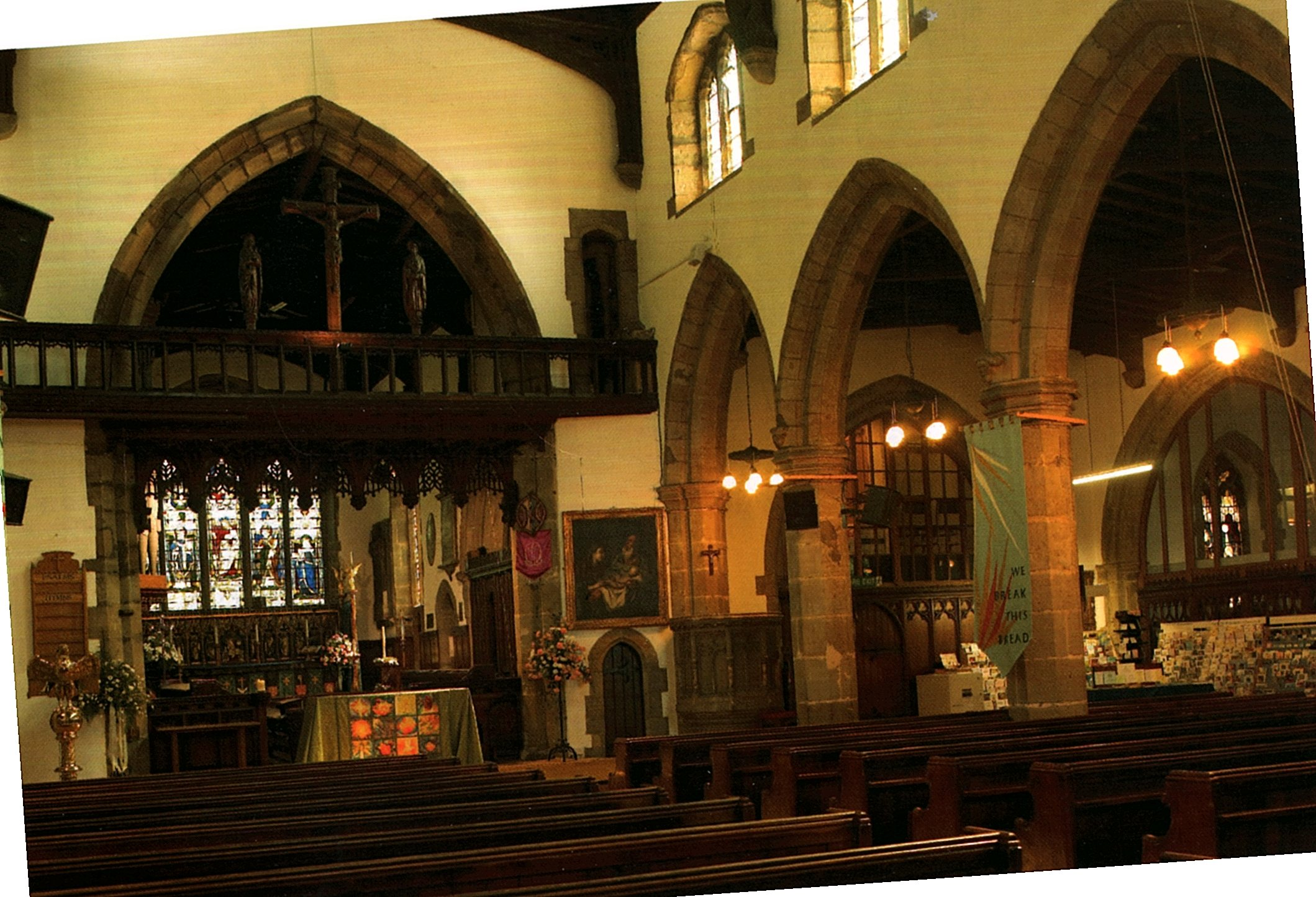
The interior of St Mary's Church, Hinckley, showing nave and rood loft

The church is entered via the north door, or through what was the North Chapel but is now the coffee bar.

The total length of the church, including the chancel and tower, is 38.4 m. But the most remarkable feature is the width of the building compared with its length: it is almost a square. The total length of the nave is only 19.1 m, while the width of the nave and aisles is 21.7 m, and including the transepts, 31.7 m. The chancel is also small for such a large building, being only ll.9 m long and 5.5 m wide. The tower is 5.6 m by 5.6 m. The height of the nave to the centre of the roof is 11 m.

== Font ==
Part of the restoration of 1875–78 : it was originally placed near the north door, and was removed to its present position in 1888. It has a circular bowl, on four small attached piers, with four marble shafts standing on a high base. Round the bowl is carved the text; ``Suffer little children to come unto me and forbid them not." (Words of Jesus, see Mark, Chapter 10, verse 14)

== Tower arch ==
Perhaps the finest architectural feature of the church is this arch (early fourteenth century). It is four-centred, the upper curves of which are very flat, without capitals, and with ribs at each angle running from floor to the point of the arch.

== Rood screen ==
In medieval times, there would have been a beautifully carved rood screen, but this was destroyed during the reformation. However, the original thirteenth-century winding stone stair still remains and in accessed on the right of the chancel arch. The steps have never been restored and are very worn.

The current rood screen was erected in 1905 as a memorial to Queen Victoria, at a cost of £250. In 1931 the crucifix and figures of St Mary (on the left) and St John were added. The choir stalls all belong to the Victorian restoration.

== Music at St Mary's ==
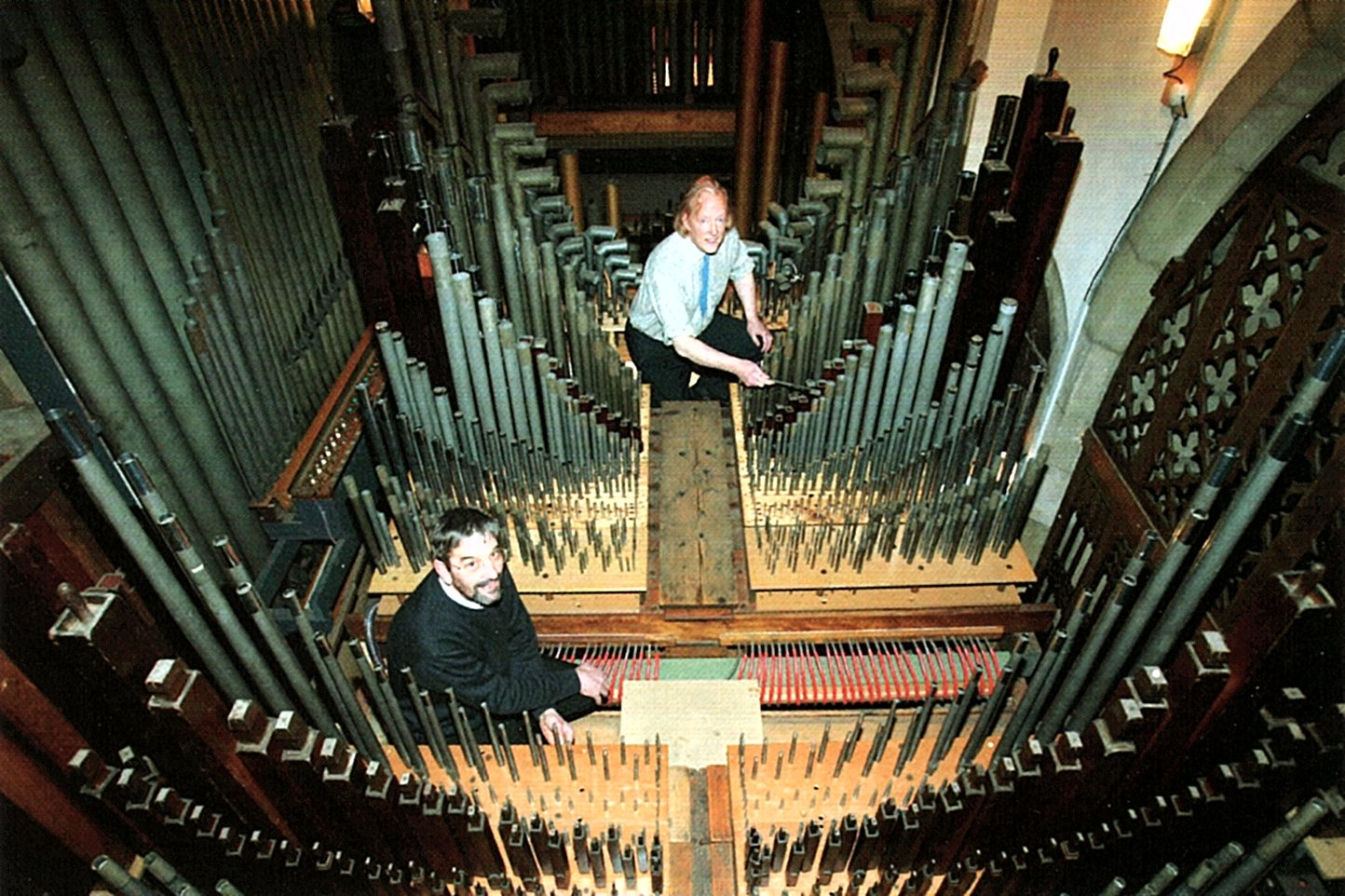
Roger FiField (centre) and Rowan Almet (left) during the installation of the current organ at St Mary's, Hinckley

There is a long history of music at St Mary's Church. The church currently boasts an organ, two worship bands and numerous choirs including a traditional robed choir and Gospel Choirs.

The first organ was installed in the east gallery in 1808, built by George Pike England, the son of the famous organ builder George England. It had three keyboards, 21 stops and 1,370 pipes but no pedal board. It cost £525.

During the Victorian restoration, the organ was rebuilt on the south side of the chancel. In 1908 a new organ was built by Norman and Beard in the north transept of the chancel. It had 37 speaking stops and over 2,000 pipes. It was electrified in 1966. By the 1990s it was in much need of restoration and it was eventually dismantled and replaced with an organ from a redundant church in Leicester – St Paul's, Kirby Road. This organ contained some original pipework by Brindley & Foster of Sheffield. The installation of the organ, completed in 2005, was done by Roger Fifield of Leamington Spa. It has 43 speaking stops and about 2,500 pipes.

== Stained-glass windows ==
There are a number of stained-glass windows remaining in the church.

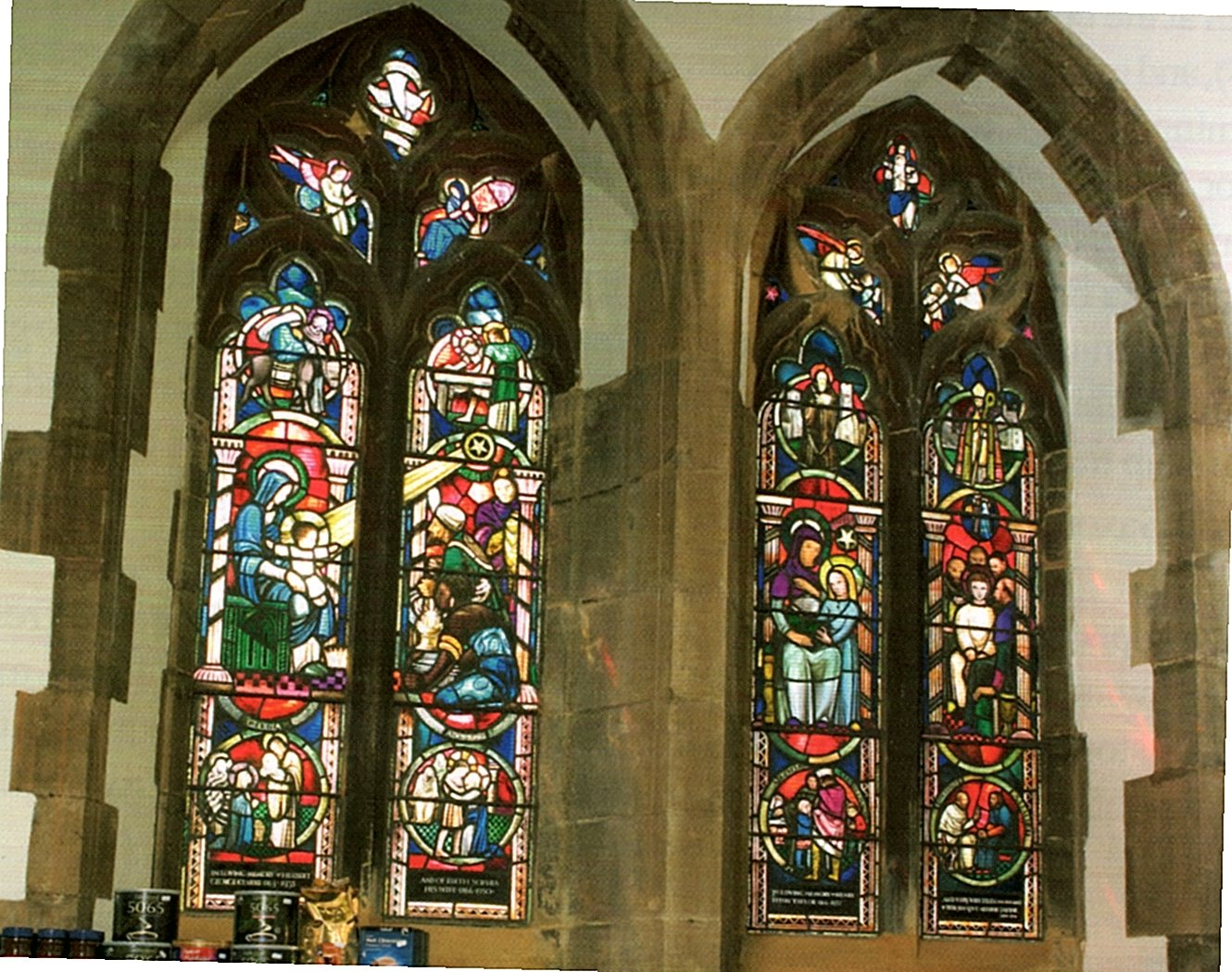
Stained-glass windows depicting the childhood of Christ and education

At the west end of the south aisle are two windows. The one on the left in memory of Herbert and Edith Clark. Herbert became chairman of Sketchley Dye Works and lived in Forest View (now in the grounds of John Cleveland College)

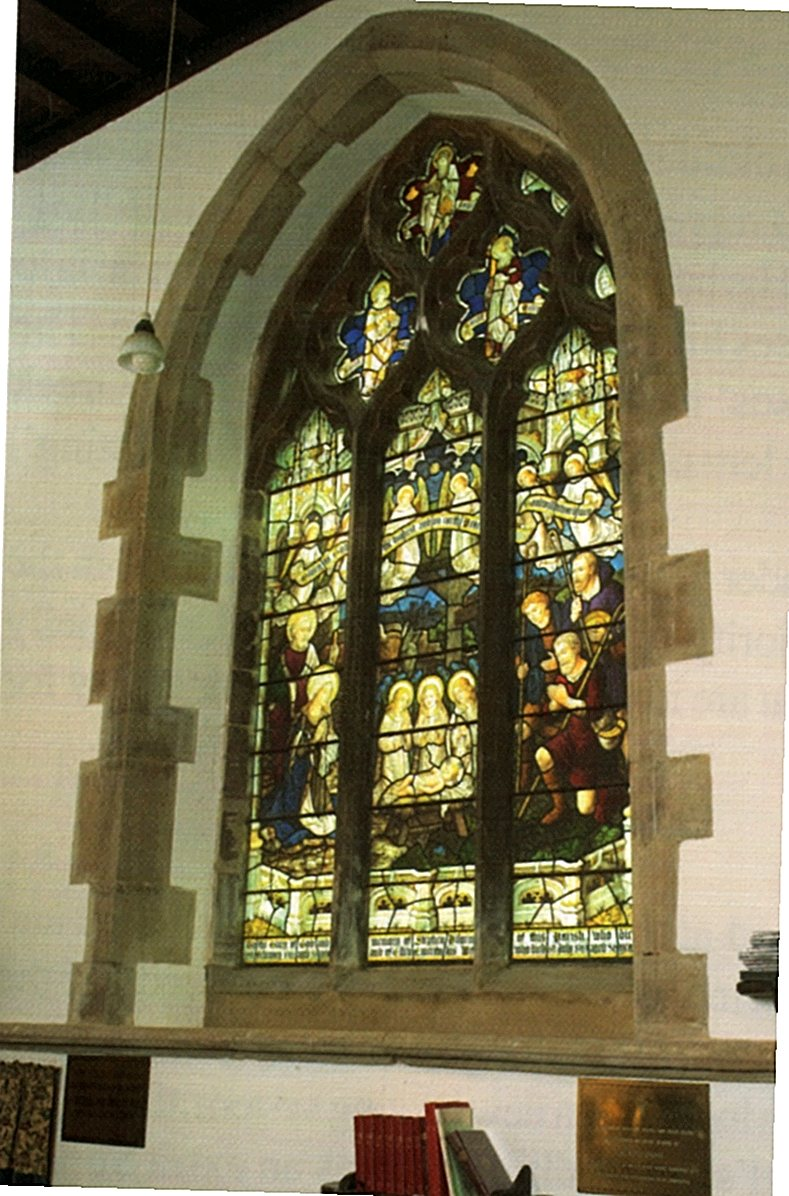
Burlison and Grylls created this window with a very English-looking Mary and a shepherd resembling George V in 1919

In the side chapel is probably the favourite window in St Mary's, depicting the Nativity. It was created by Burlison and Grylls in 1919 and shows a very English looking Mary, with golden hair, and shepherds with well trimmed beards, one even resembling George V.

Other windows include The Annunciation by Mayer & Co about 1890, also in the Side Chapel, and in the north aisle, near the entrance, is the Resurrection Window, in memory of Elizabeth and Margaret Yeomans (1925) which was made by Christopher Webb.

== Clock, bells and chimes ==
The church contains one of the finest peals of bells in the county. Five of these were first cast at the start of the seventeenth century. In 1925 all eight were recast; the heaviest weighs 1.12 tonnes. The bells are still rungs every Sunday for the main morning worship, and practice sessions are held on Monday evening.

The current clock was installed by Gillett & Johnston of Croydon in 1876. It strikes the Westminster Quarters on four bells.

In the clock room there is also a carillon – it operates like a large musical box. The mahogany barrel is 1.22m long and 0.91m in diameter. The clock and carillon underwent a major restoration in 2016. The tunes change every day. Three original tunes remain – Hymn by Handel, The National Anthem and Highland Laddie. Other tunes include Aurelia by SS Wesley, St Francis Xavier by Handel.
