= Hinckley =

Town in Leicestershire, England

Coordinates: 52.5413°N 1.3725°W

- Town
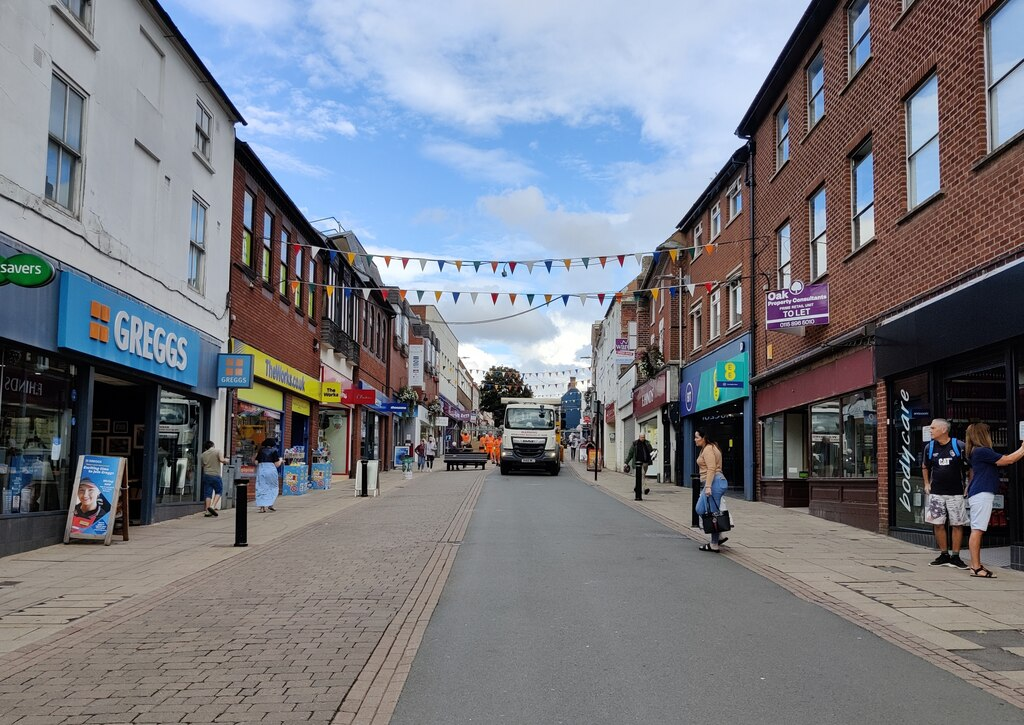
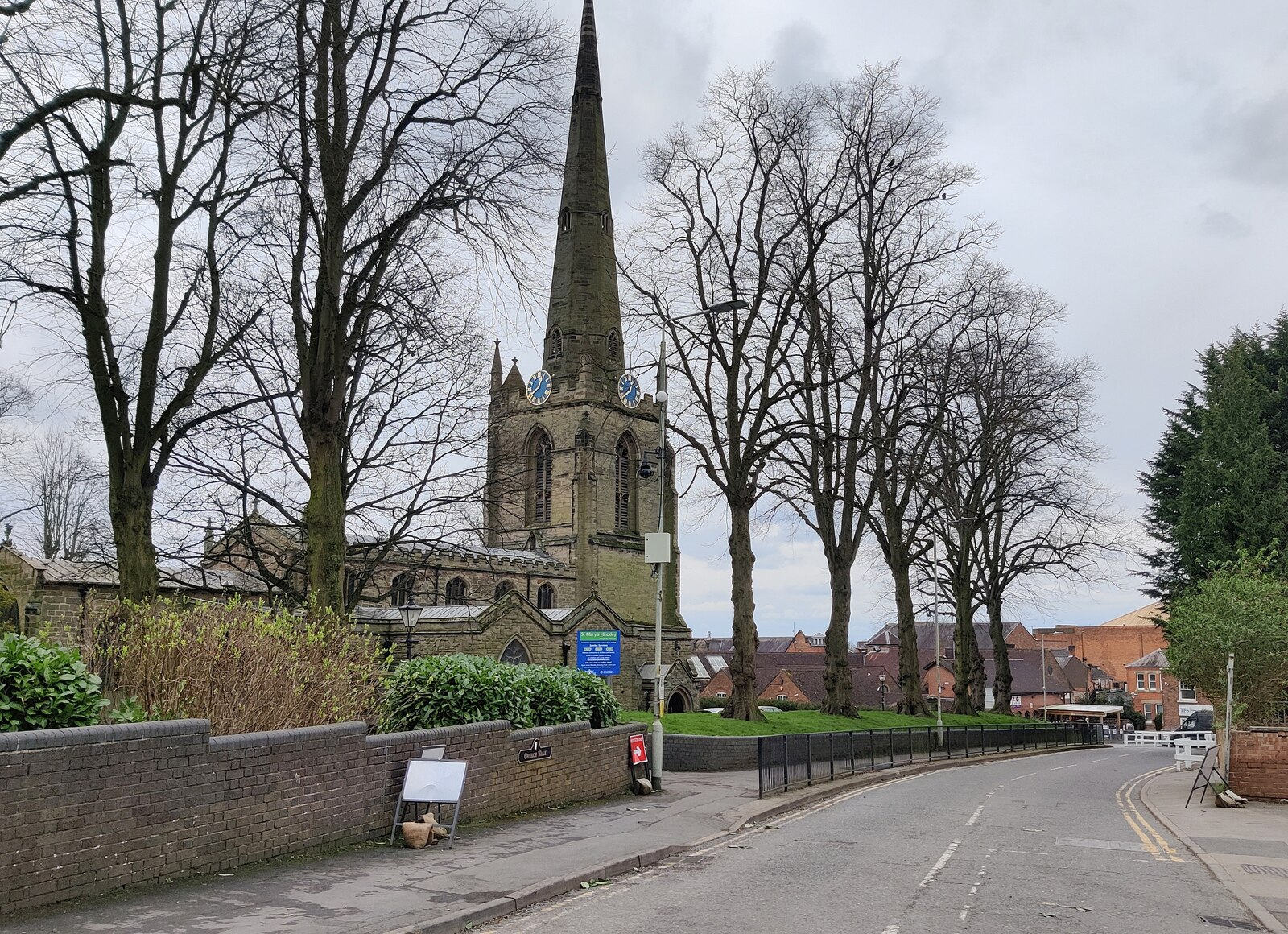
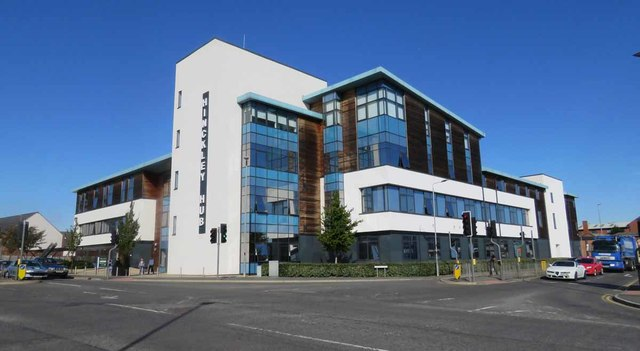
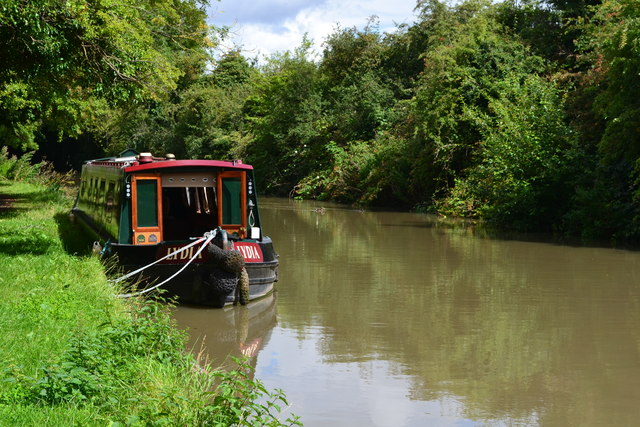
- Castle Street St Mary's Church The Hub Ashby Canal

- Location within Leicestershire
- Population: 50,712 (Urban area included Burbage)
- OS grid reference: SP425939
- Civil parish: Hinckley (Unparished)/Burbage (Parished)
- District: Hinckley and Bosworth
- Shire county: Leicestershire
- Region: East Midlands
- Country: England
- Sovereign state: United Kingdom
- Areas of the town: List: Burbage (Village); Burbage St Catherines and Lash Hill (Ward); Burbage Sketchley and Stretton (Ward); Castle (Ward); Clarendon (Ward); De Montfort (Ward); Lash Hill; Leicester Grange; Sketchley; St Catherine's; Stretton; Tilton; Trinity (Ward)
- Post town: HINCKLEY
- Postcode district: LE10
- Dialling code: 01455
- Police: Leicestershire
- Fire: Leicestershire
- Ambulance: East Midlands
- UK Parliament: Hinckley and Bosworth

Hinckley is a market town in south-west Leicestershire, England, administered by Hinckley and Bosworth Borough Council. Hinckley is the third largest settlement in Leicestershire, after Leicester and Loughborough, and is about halfway between Leicester and Coventry, close to Nuneaton and Watling Street, on the border with Warwickshire. The town is part of an urban area with the large village of Burbage to the south.

== History ==
In 2000, archaeologists from Northampton Archaeology discovered evidence of Iron Age and Romano-British settlement on land near Coventry Road and Watling Street.

Hinckley has a recorded history going back to Anglo-Saxon times; the name Hinckley is Anglo-Saxon: "Hinck" is a personal name and "ley" is a clearing in a wood. By the time of the Domesday Book in 1086, Hinckley was quite a large village, and it grew over the following 200 years into a small market town—a market was first recorded there in 1311. There is evidence of an Anglo-Saxon church—the remnants of an Anglo-Saxon sundial being visible on the diagonal buttress on the south-east corner of the chancel.

Hinckley is around four miles (six kilometres) south of what is believed to be the location of the Battle of Bosworth, the last significant battle of the Wars of the Roses, which occurred in 1485, and resulted in Henry Tudor's forces defeating those of King Richard III.

=== 17th century ===
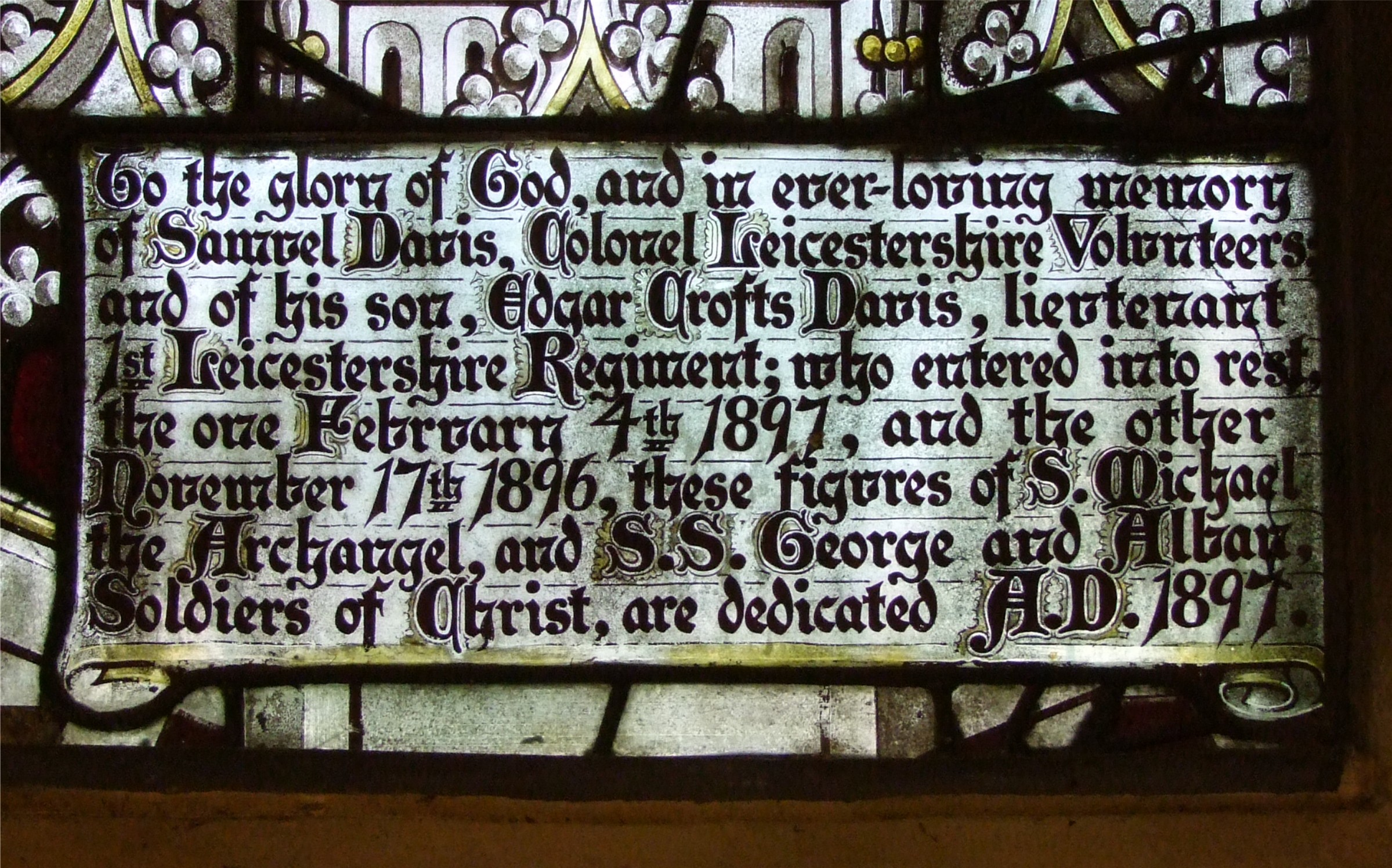
This inscription is part of a window in St Mary's church, Hinckley

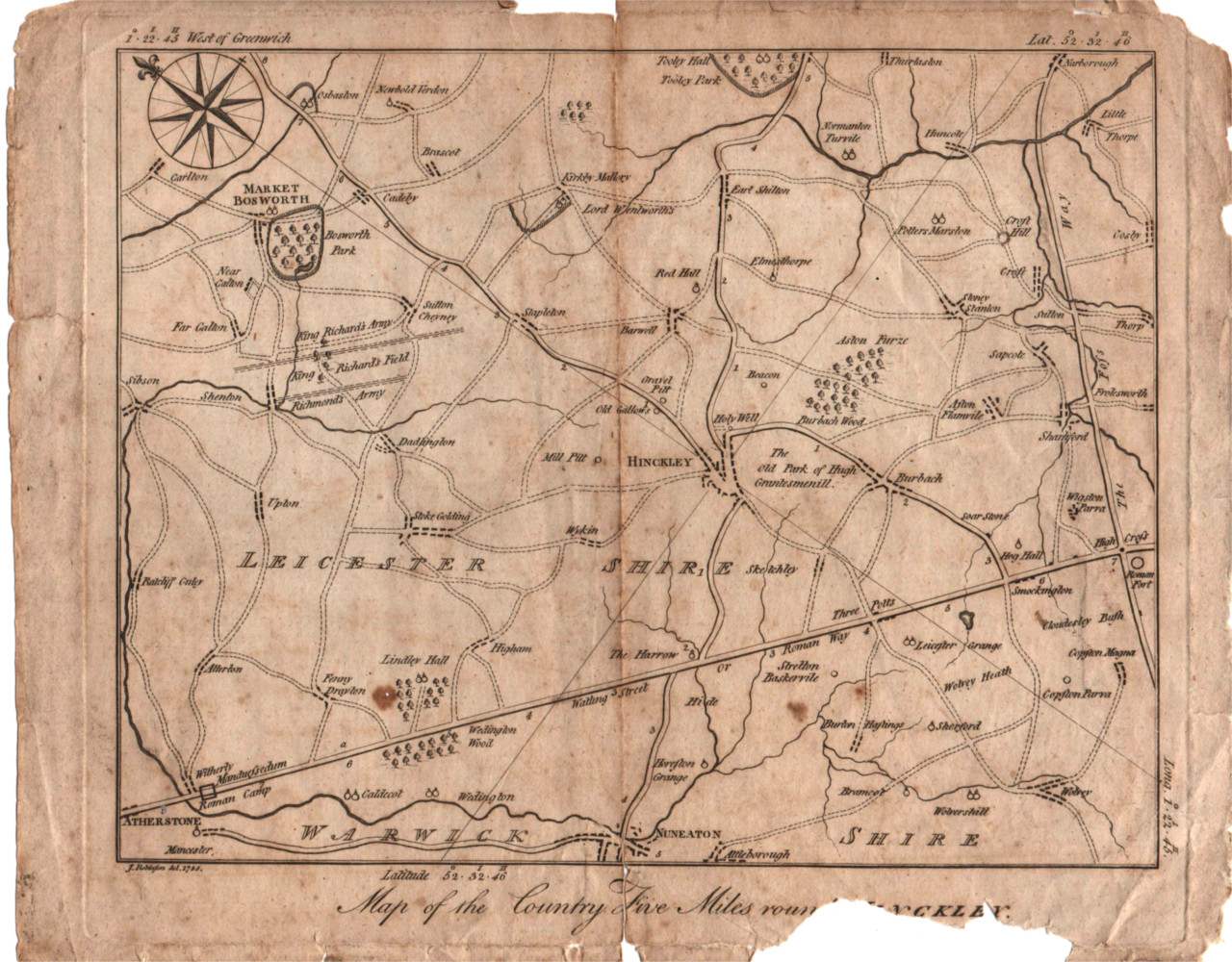
Map of Hinckley and its surroundings dated 1786

In the 17th century, the town developed a hosiery industry, producing stockings and similar items. Hinckley played a prominent part in the English Civil War. Its proximity to several rival strongholds—the royalist garrisons at Caldicote, Ashby de la Zouch and Leicester, and those of the Parliamentarians at Tamworth and Coventry—and the presence of parties of troops or brigands occupying several fortified houses in nearby Warwickshire, led to frequent visits by the warring parties. The local townsfolk were forced to decide whether to declare their allegiances openly or attempt to remain neutral—with the risk of having to pay levies, ransoms, and fines to both sides.

In March 1644, Hinckley was occupied by a group of Royalist troops, though they were soon driven out by a force of Parliamentarians, who took many prisoners.

The Civil War years were a particularly unsettled time for the clergy in and around Hinckley. Parsons with parliamentary leanings like Thomas Cleveland, the vicar of Hinckley, suffered sequestration by the Leicester County Committee, like some of his "malignant" neighbours accused of visiting royalist garrisons or preaching against Parliament.

The town was visited by both parliamentary and royalist troops from the rival garrisons, particularly parliamentary troops from Tamworth, Coventry and Astley Castle in Warwickshire. Troops from Coventry garrison were particularly active in the town, taking horses and "free quarter" and availing themselves of 'dyett and Beere', and taking some of the inhabitants hostage for ransom. Royalist troops raided the town to threaten those with parliamentary sympathies. The notorious Lord Hastings of Ashby de la Zouch is recorded to have "coursed about the country as far as Dunton and Lutterworth and took near upon a hundred of the clergymen and others, and carried them prisoners … threatening to hang all them that should take the Parliament's Covenant".

Parliamentary newssheets record that on the night of 4 March 1644, Hastings's men brought in "26 honest countrymen from several towns" intending to take them to Ashby de la Zouch, along with a huge herd of cattle, oxen and horses from the country people and a minister named Warner. These prisoners were herded into Hinckley church and asked "in a jeering manner, 'Where are the Round-heads your brethren at Leicester? Why come they not to redeem you?'"

The Parliamentarians responded in a memorable "Skirmish or Great Victory for Parliament". Colonel Grey with 120 foot-soldiers and 30 troopers from Bagworth House rushed to Hinckley and retook the town, routed the Royalists, rescued the cattle and released their imprisoned countrymen. No doubt the inhabitants of the town were as relieved as any when Ashby finally surrendered, as Vicars records, "a great mercy and mighty preservation of the peace and tranquility of all those adjacent parts about it."

=== 19th century ===
At the time of the first national census in 1801, Hinckley had a population of 5,158: twenty years later it had increased by about a thousand. The largest industry in the early 19th century was the making of hosiery and only Leicester had a larger output of stockings. In the district, it was estimated around 1830 that 6,000 persons were employed in this work.

Between 1816 and 1822, Ada Byron, the only legitimate daughter of the poet, Lord Byron, lived at Kirby House, Kirkby Mallory six miles (ten kilometres) from Hinckley. She was cared for by her grandmother, while running their midland estates and necessitating frequent visits to the bank in Hinckley. Ada would go with her, and it is recorded, Ada "loved Hinckley". If she misbehaved, her grandmother would leave her at home. Ada was christened at Kirkby Mallory Parish Church and a significant memorial stands in the churchyard to her. Hinckley is recognised as Ada's childhood home town. She was known latterly as Ada Lovelace and when working with Charles Babbage, she foresaw computerisation, writing the first computer programme.

Joseph Hansom built the first Hansom cab in Hinckley in 1835.

In 1899 a cottage hospital was built to celebrate the Diamond Jubilee of Queen Victoria two years earlier. Money was raised by the local townspeople and factory owners, notably John and Thomas Atkins who also had a hand in building many of the key buildings of Hinckley. The cornerstone was laid by Sir John Fowke Lancelot Rolleston.

This hospital was central to the people of Hinckley and supported by local workers who donated one penny a week for its upkeep until it was adopted by the NHS in 1948. Over the years it expanded to align with the town. The hospital now appears dilapidated in some areas and is threatened with closure, sale and demolition by West Leicestershire Clinical Commissioning Group and NHS Properties Ltd.

=== Recent ===
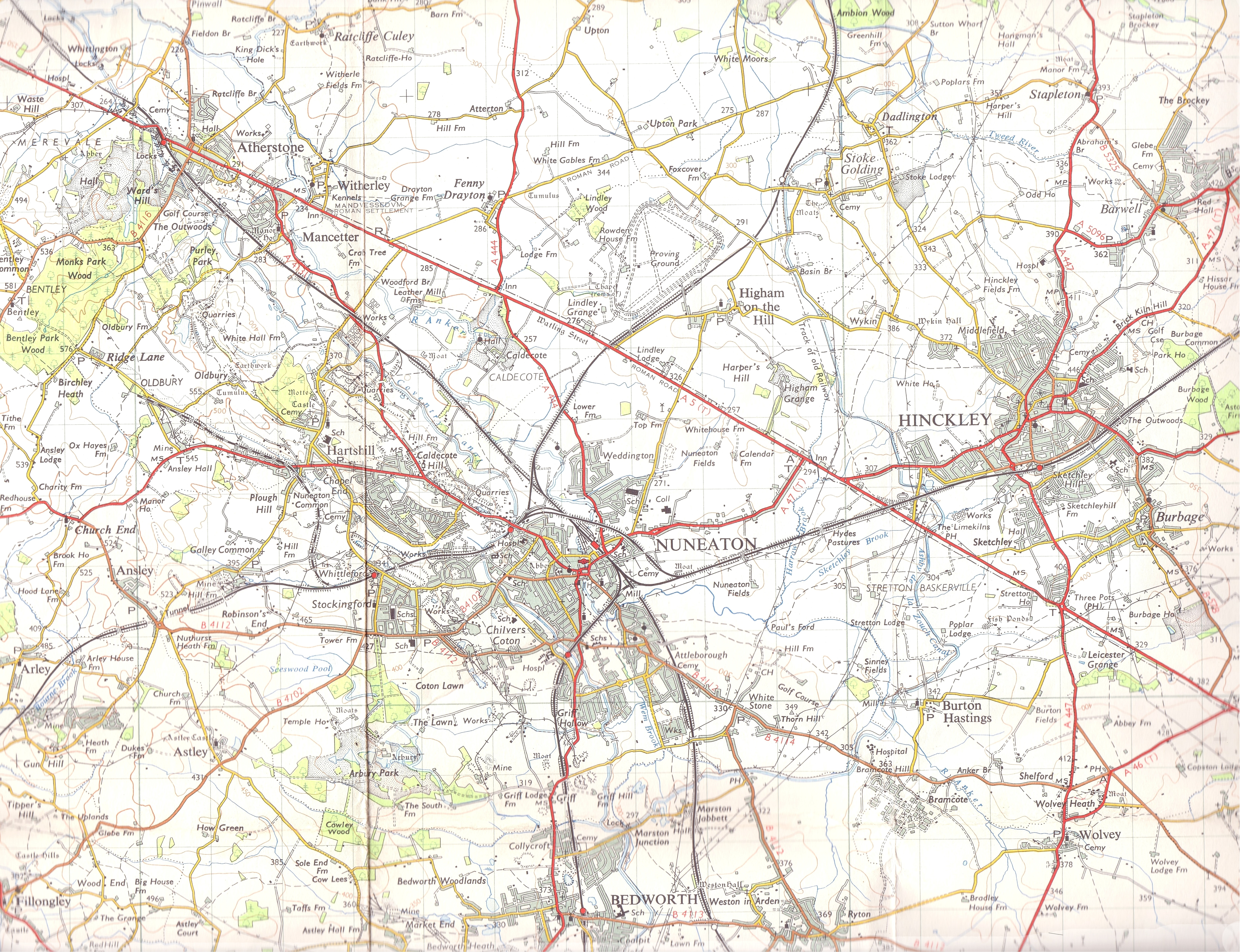
A 1961 1 inch = 1 mile series map, covering Hinckley, Nuneaton, part of Bedworth, Atherstone, Ansley, Burton Hastings, Hartshill and Wolvey

On 16 May 1941 eleven people were killed, which was the worst attack in the county, outside Leicester. Nearby Nuneaton was heavily bombed that night. In Merevale Avenue, four men, six women and one child were killed. Numbers 5 and 7 had a direct hit.

The hosiery industry remained important for much of the 20th century, and by 1939 the Hinckley and District Hosiery Union alone had 6,000 members.

The area was subject to new housing developments in the 1950s, 1960s and 1990s.

== Geography ==
Hinckley's suburban districts include Hollycroft, Middlefield, Stoneygate, Wykin, Forest View, West Hinckley, Saxon Paddock and Druid Quarter. The suburbs of Burbage, Sketchley and Lash Hill are separated from the rest of Hinckley by the railway line.

== Governance ==
Hinckley became an urban district under the Local Government Act 1894, covering the ancient parish of Hinckley. In 1934, under a County Review Order, Hinckley urban district expanded to include the ancient parishes of Barwell, Burbage and Earl Shilton and most of Stoke Golding. In 1974, under the Local Government Act 1972 the Hinckley urban district was abolished, becoming an unparished area in the borough of Hinckley and Bosworth. Since then, the civil parishes of Barwell, Burbage, Earl Shilton and Stoke Golding have been re-established. The core urban area remained unparished.

== Landmarks ==
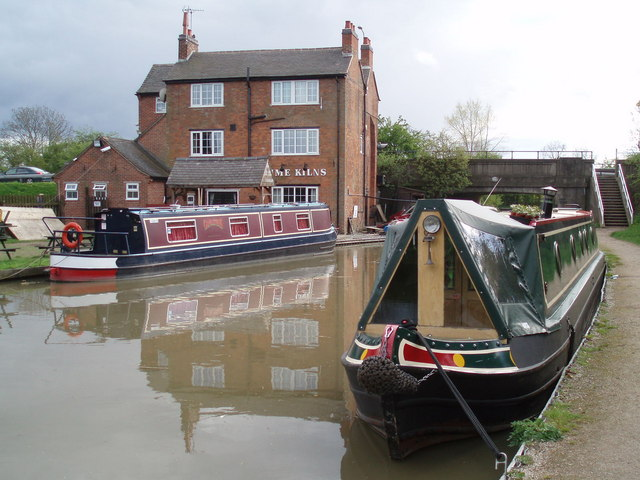
The canalside pub, The Lime Kilns, nr. Hinckley stands at the point where the Ashby Canal is crossed by the A5

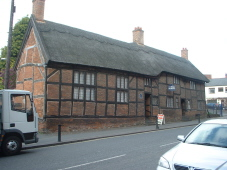
The framework knitters' cottages, Hinckley, site of the Hinckley and District Museum

- The site of the Battle of Bosworth, administered by Leicestershire County Council, includes an interpretation centre at Ambion Hill, where Richard III encamped the night before the battle. St James's Church at Dadlington is the place where many of the dead were buried and where a chantry was founded on their behalf
- Hinckley Museum is in a range of 17th-century timber-framed framework knitters' cottages. It was opened in 1996 and is open each year from Easter Monday to the end of October. The museum prepares new exhibitions for each season.
- Stoke Golding has a medieval church with a carved arcade and fine 13th-century window tracery

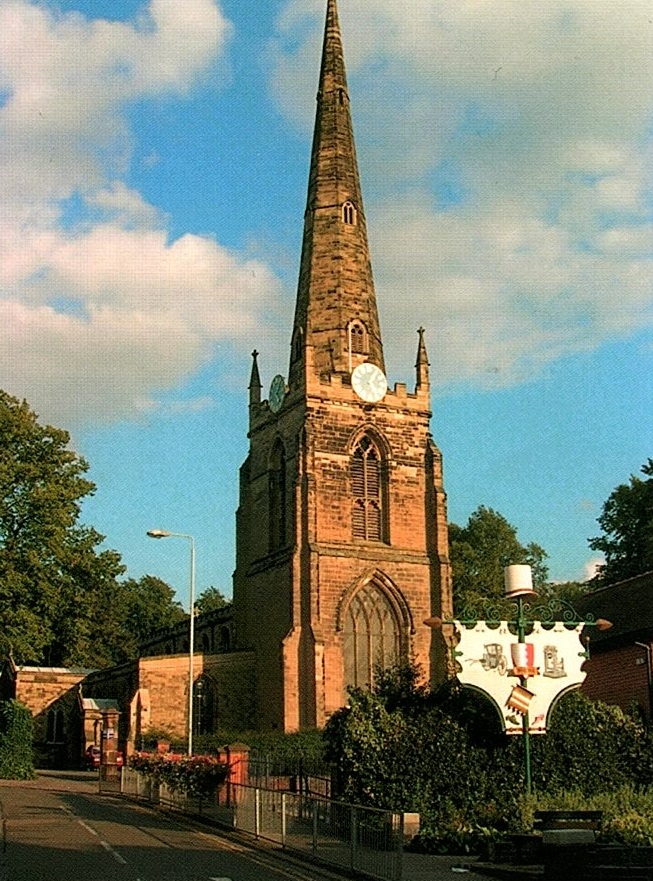
St Mary's Church

- St Mary's Church, the Church of England parish church of the Assumption of Saint Mary the Virgin, in the centre of Hinckley, is 13th-century. There is a local folk tale that a tombstone in the churchyard marking the grave of Richard Smith, a young saddler murdered in the Market Place in 1727, "bleeds" every 12 April, the anniversary of his death. The church is open daily, Monday – Saturday, 10.00 to 4.00 pm, and Sunday during services.
- The Great Meeting of 1722, hidden away behind old hosiery factories, is a notable early example of nonconformist architecture with a galleried interior.
- Britannia (Burbage) Scout HQ: the home of 1st Britannia Scout Group is a specially designed and built scout hall.
- Hollycroft Park was donated by the notable local Atkins family to the people of Hinckley in 1934, the park has two tennis courts, a bowling green, golf course, band stand and gardens. The park is the base for some of the town's biggest events including the Proms and Worldfest music events. Due to the high standards achieved within Hollycroft Park it has been awarded with Green Flag status for both 2010/1 and 2011/2
- Brodick Park in the west of Hinckley was recently the subject of controversy between local people and the Council which had wanted to sell the park for housing, however following a recent change in administration, this sale has been cancelled. The park has now been planted with trees to make a nature reserve.
- The Ashby Canal, the longest contour canal in England, passes through the town
- Hinckley has two former quarries, quite close to one another, called the Little Pit and Big Pit. The Little Pit is now designated a Site of Ecological Interest (SINC), and has been transformed by a local community group into an angling club to preserve the area of water and surrounding wildlife. It is opposite the Asda superstore entrance and is fenced off from the public. The Big Pit remains the subject of controversy between local residents and developers. It is on Ashby Road, between the cemetery and a parade of shops. It too is fenced off from public access.
- Shopping Centres: Hinckley's biggest shopping centre, Britannia Centre on Castle Street, has more than 12 stores and stalls. Hansom Court on Stockwell Head (named after the inventor of the Hansom Cab) has a number of stores. There is also The Crescent, an outdoor shopping area, containing a bus station, a supermarket and cinema, among other stores.

== Industry ==
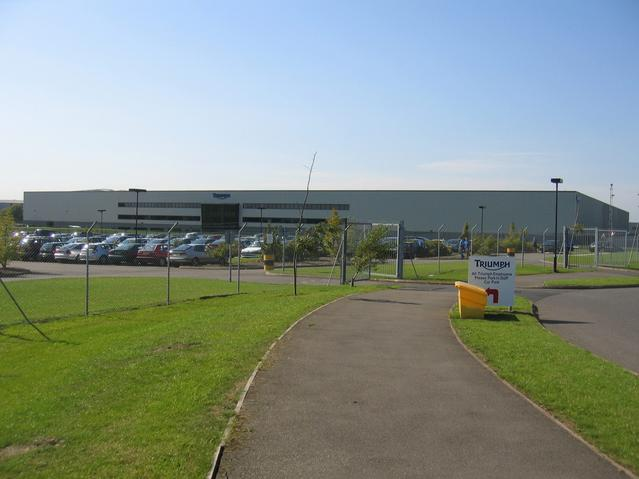
The Triumph Motorcycle Factory at Hinckley

Hinckley is a traditional centre of the hosiery industry. The first framework knitting machine was brought here by Joseph Iliffe in the 17th century and by the 19th century Hinckley was responsible for a large proportion of Britain's hosiery production. Since the Second World War the hosiery industry has steadily shrunk although several textile firms remain in the area. Hinckley & District Museum, housed in a range of former framework knitters' cottages, tells the story of the hosiery industry and contains some examples of framework knitting machines.

Paynes Garages Ltd, one of the oldest family-owned Ford Motor Dealerships in the UK. Established by JA Payne in 1907, the firm became Ford Dealers in 1922. The business remains family owned with Nigel Payne, grandson of the founder, one of the current Directors.

The town's central location and good links to the UK motorway network have made it a common location for distribution warehouses. Hammonds Furniture, a family owned nationwide fitted furniture company, was established in the town in 1926 by Thomas Hammonds, and currently employs over 850 people in its two Hinckley factories.

Hinckley has housed the Triumph Motorcycles Ltd facility since 1990. Founded in 1902 Triumph is one of the oldest motorcycle producers still in activity.

Electricity was first provided Hinckley by the Leicestershire and Warwickshire Electric Power Company in 1913. Hinckley power station was built in Nutts Lane adjacent to the railway and the Ashby Canal. The power station closed in the early 1950s, when electricity was supplied from the National Grid.

Hinckley is home to a well-established creative and technology community with designers, illustrators, artists and photographers taking up residence in the town, particularly in converted buildings such as the renovated Atkins Building (formerly Atkins Hosiery, also home to the Hinckley Times newspaper) and Graphic House on Druid Street, also a former factory converted to modern office and studio use.

Sports car manufacturer Ultima Sports are based in Hinckley. They claim to have set the fastest roadcar lap around the Top Gear test track with their GTR720 model, although it has never appeared on the programme.

== Transport ==
The town is equidistant (19 km/12 miles) from Coventry and Leicester and 8 km (5 mi) to the east of Nuneaton. The small town of Ibstock is 18 km (11 mi) to the north on the A447.

=== Roads ===
The A47 between Nuneaton and Leicester was by-passed around the town during the early 1990s when the Northern Perimeter Road (Normandy Way) was completed. As well as relieving congestion in the town centre, new commercial developments have been built along the route.

Hinckley is also served by the A5 and the M69. The A5 links Hinckley to Tamworth, Staffordshire in the north-west and Milton Keynes in the south-east. The M69 links Hinckley to the nearest cities, Coventry, and Leicester, and the M1 and M6 motorways.

=== Bus ===
Arriva Midlands are the main operator of bus services within the town centre operating services to Leicester, Burbage, Earl Shilton and Nuneaton from their depot in Barwell.

Centrebus operate service LC6 to Coalville while Stagecoach in Warwickshire also operate a number of other routes around Hinckley. Stagecoach operate the 148 alongside Arriva's 158, Leicester - Nuneaton, whilst the 148 continues to Coventry.

=== Railway ===
Hinckley railway station is on the Nuneaton to Leicester section of the Birmingham to Peterborough Line and has regular services between Birmingham and Leicester via Narborough and Nuneaton. Journeys to London can be made via the West Coast Main Line through Nuneaton to London Euston or the Midland Main Line via Leicester to London St Pancras.

=== Airports ===
The nearest airports are East Midlands and Birmingham.

== Media ==
The local radio station, Fosse 107, serves the town and the surrounding area. The town's local newspaper is the weekly paid-for Hinckley Times, which is published every Wednesday. The Hinckley Times regularly publish news stories on their own section of the Leicester Mercury's website, LeicestershireLive. Castle Mead Radio is a hospital radio station which serves the patients and staff of Hinckley's two main hospitals. BBC local radio station that broadcast to the town is BBC Radio Leicester, BBC CWR can also be received in the town.

Local television news programmes are BBC East Midlands Today and ITV News Central (East).

== Sport ==
The town has had six notable football clubs over the years:

- Hinckley Town – formed in the 19th century, dissolved in 1906, reformed in 1972 and merged with Hinckley Athletic in 1997 to form Hinckley United
- Hinckley Athletic – formed in 1906 as Hinckley United, changed name to Hinckley Athletic after World War II, merged with Hinckley Town in 1997 to form Hinckley United
- Hinckley F.C. – formed in 1967 as Downes Sports, changed name to Hinckley Downes in 2007, and again to Hinckley in 2010, before dissolving in 2011
- Hinckley United – formed in 1997 as result of a merger between Hinckley Athletic and Hinckley Town, dissolved in 2014
- Hinckley Leicester Road – formed in 2013,
- Hinckley A.F.C. – formed in 2014

Hinckley Rugby Club, was formed in 1893 and has been based at the Leicester Road Sports ground since 1968. The club has played in rugby league since 1987. The first team currently play in National 2 North (level 4).

Hinckley Ladies' Netball Club is based at the Leicester Road Sports Ground and has four senior teams in the Coventry and Warwickshire Netball League. Hinckley Gymnastics Club, established in 1971, is based at Clarendon Park.

Hinckley Basketball Club was founded in 1974, and included staff, ex-students and students of John Cleveland College. The team folded after the 2012–13 season, because of player shortage, then reformed in 2014. It plays home games at Green Towers club on Richmond Road. The two club teams are the Hinckley 69ers in Division 2, and Hinckley Hail in Division 4, of the Leicestershire men's league.

Hollycroft Park, in the centre of Hinckley, contains two tennis courts, a golf pitch'n'putt and a lawn bowls green with pavilion. Greentowers, a self-funded charity, is a youth club at Richmond Park which contains a climbing wall, skate park, astro turf pitch, and a BMX track.

On 8 May 2014, the Hinckley to Bedford second stage of The Women's Tour Great Britain cycle race, departed from Hinckley.

Heart of England Boxing Club is based on Druid Street in the town

== Education ==
The main primary schools in the area are Battling Brook CP, Richmond, Hinckley Parks, St. Peter's Catholic, St. Mary's Church of England, Westfield Infant and Junior Schools, Burbage Infant and Junior Schools and Sketchley Hill Primary School (in Burbage). The high (secondary) schools include Redmoor, St Martin's Catholic Academy (in Stoke Golding), Hastings (in Burbage) and The Hinckley School. The Hinckley School also operates a sixth form. North Warwickshire & Hinckley College, a Further Education college, is also in the town. The only other major college in the area is Heath Lane Academy (Earl Shilton). The closest universities are the University of Leicester, Leicester De Montfort University and Coventry University, all approximately 12 miles (19 kilometres) from central Hinckley. There are also many pre-schools (nurseries) such as St Peters Pre school little explorers, St Bernards, Flutterbies Hinckley, Smiles PreSchool, etc. Within Hinckley there is also Dorothy Goodman Special School that caters for both juniors and seniors with disabilities, with units integrated within other local schools, most notably the Fusion Academy in neighbouring Barwell.

== Culture ==
Simon de Montfort's banner, described as the 'Arms of Honour of Hinckley', per pale indented argent and gules, is shown in stained glass in Chartres Cathedral, and is used in Hinckley's coat of arms, local sports teams and other organisations. Combined with Montfort's personal coat of arms, it forms part of the club crest for the town's football club Hinckley A.F.C.

Concordia Theatre, of 400 seats and regular productions, is near the centre of the town in Stockwell Head. The local council holds an annual 'Proms in The Park' event.

French organist and composer Louis Vierne gave a recital and stayed one night in Hinckley while on a tour of England, and later wrote a carillon piece for organ called "The Bells of Hinckley", inspired by a carillon of bells he heard there. It is the last movement of his fourth suite of Vingt-quatre pièces de fantaisie.

The town is mentioned in Shakespeare's Henry IV, Part 2 (Act 5, Scene 1):

Davy: Now, sir, a new link to the bucket must need be had: and, sir, do you mean to stop any of William's wages, about the sack he lost the other day at Hinckley fair?

Hinckley is mentioned in the Monty Python sketch "Olympic Hide and Seek Final" as the home town of one of the competitors.

The Simon Pegg and Nick Frost comedy horror series Truth Seekers has a major plot line centered around Hinckley. The episode 'The Hinckley Boy' sees Frost's character travel to the town.

== Notable people ==
- John Cleveland (1613–1658), English royalist poet and political satirist, attended Hinckley Grammar School
- Joseph Nutt (1700–1775), surveyor of highways
- William Bass (1717–1787), founder of Bass Brewery
- Richard Amner (1736–1803), Presbyterian divine
- John Nichols (1745–1826), author, printer and antiquary
- Robert Chessher (1750–1831), first British orthopedist
- George Canning (1770–1827), second shortest-serving former Prime Minister of the United Kingdom
- Joseph Hansom (1803–1882), lived in Hinckley, where he invented the hansom cab
- Ada Lovelace (1815-1852), mathematician
- Nat Langham (1820–1871), middleweight bare-knuckle prize fighter
- William Aucott (1830–1915), trade unionist
- Charlotte Mary Brame (1836–1884), Victorian novelist
- William Butler (1843–1907), founder of Mitchells & Butlers Brewery
- Jahleel Brenton Carey (1847–1883), military officer
- Robert James Lees (1849-1931), Victorian Spiritualist was born in Hinckley
- Frederick Fox Riley (1869–1934), trade unionist
- Colonel Ernest Clive Atkins (1870–1953)
- Charles Watts (1894–1979), cricketer
- Clifford Groocock (1895–1988), trade union leader
- William Pratt (1895–1974), cricketer
- Ernie Walker (1889–1958), former Leicester City footballer
- Edmund Percival (1907–1951), research chemist
- Jack Busson (1910–1989), professional golfer
- Rex Malcolm Chaplin Dawson (1924–2021), biochemist
- Donald Cobley (1928–1999), Olympic pentathlete
- Alan Bray (1929–2016), sports shooter
- Una Stubbs (1937–2021), actress, television personality, and dancer, grew up in Hinckley
- Davey Graham (1940–2008), influential guitarist and folk singer
- Geoffrey Richardson (1950), musician, viola player, multi-instrumentalist
- Alan Taylor (1953), former West Ham United footballer
- Phil Oakey (1955), singer with The Human League
- Simon Webster (1964), former West Ham United footballer
- Sarah Jane Coleman (1970), professional artist, born and based in Hinckley. Attended John Cleveland College. Niece of musician Geoffrey Richardson.
- Graeme Hawley (1975), actor who played John Stape in Coronation Street
- Andy Lee (1980), professional snooker player
- Paul Hines (1980), BriSCA Formula 1 Stock Cars driver, former British and European Champion
- Jim Smallman (1978), co-founder of Progress Wrestling and WWE NXT writer, grew up in Hinckley
- Glen Richards (1983), Australian former professional motorcyclist
- Lauren Samuels (1988), television and West End actress, trained in Hinckley
- Manu Tuilagi (1991), Leicester Tigers and England rugby player, attended John Cleveland College

== Folklore ==
Hinckley was known to its residents for many years as "Tin 'At" (tin hat). It is reputed that, many years ago, one of the itinerant sheep drovers bragged that he could drink a hat full of ale. The local landlord put this man to the test by getting the local blacksmith to make a tin hat, which he then filled with ale. Thereafter, the town became known as "Tin 'At". Another explanation is that the people of Hinckley used to place buckets on water pumps to keep them clean and prevent the spread of illness, the bucket obviously being the "Tin 'At". A tin hat can be seen on top of the flag pole which sits on the roof of the Coral branch at the corner of Castle Street and Market Place. There is also a pub called The Tin Hat, and an annual fair held each December in the town centre called The Tin Hat Fair.

== Twinning ==
Hinckley is twinned with Le Grand-Quevilly, France, and joined with Herford, Germany in the early 1970s. Hinckley is also twinned with Midland, Ohio, United States.
