= Ashby Canal Trust =

Waterway society in Leicestershire, England

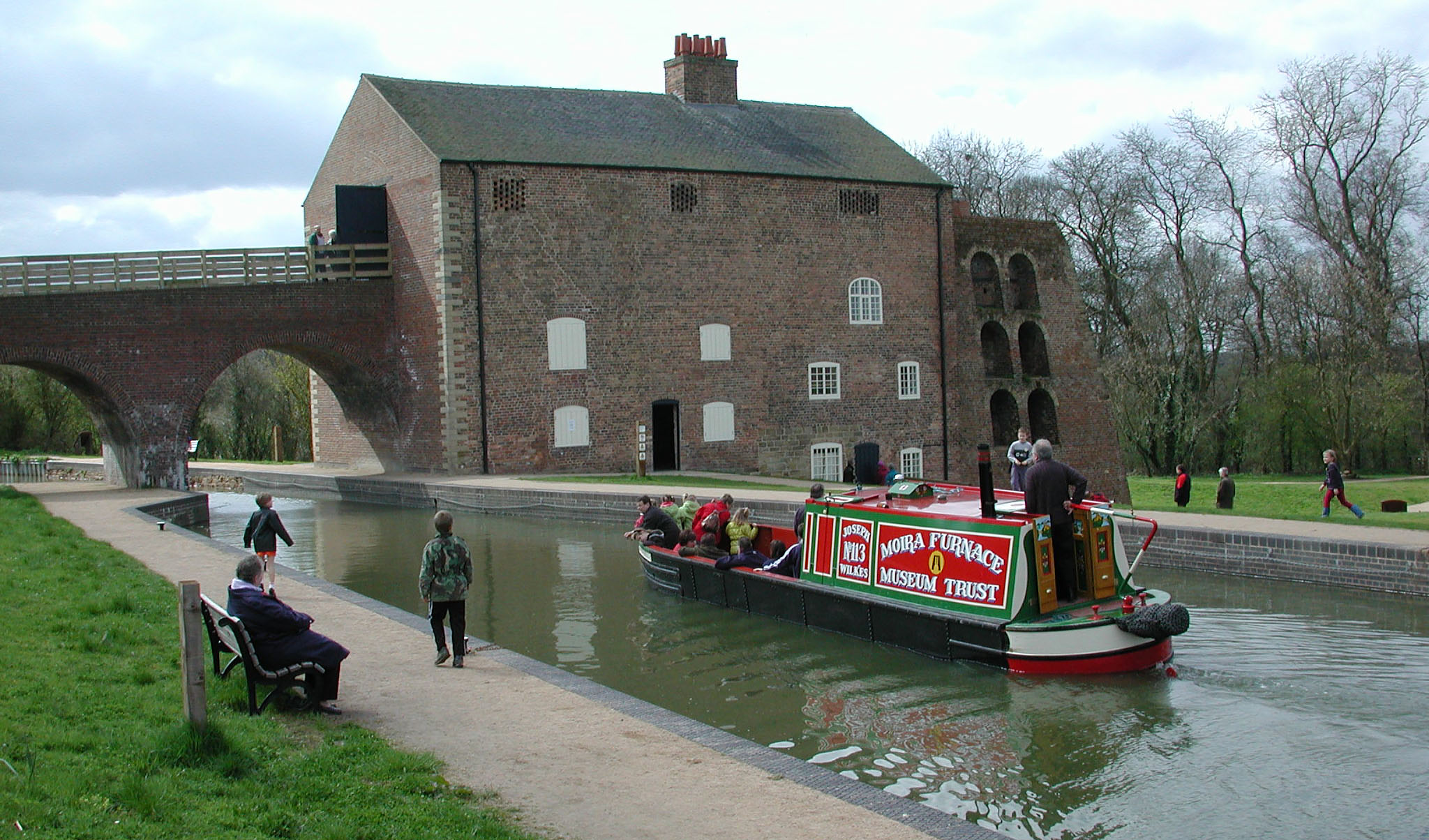
Moira Furnace

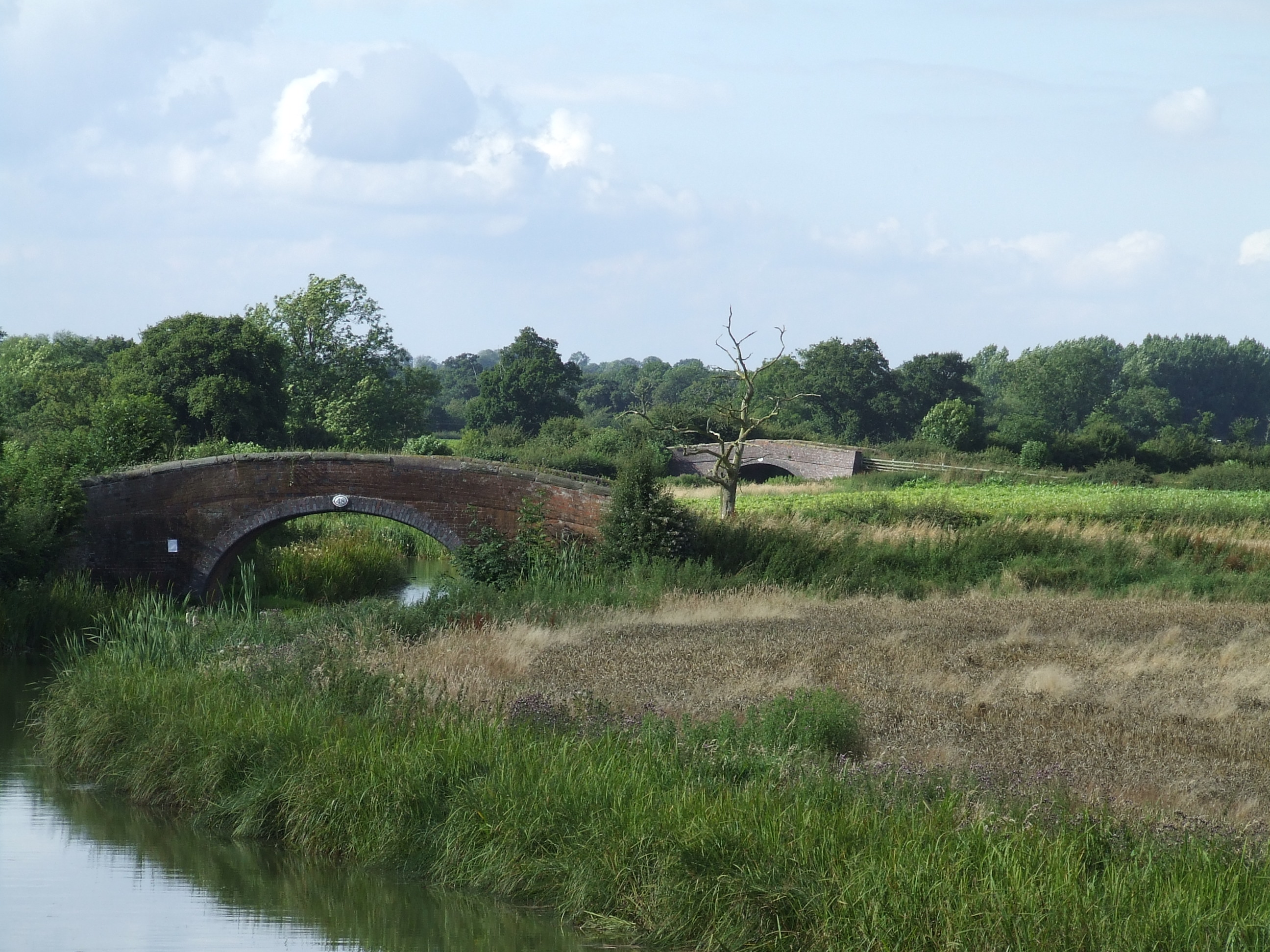
Ashby Canal near Congerstone

The Ashby Canal Trust is a waterway society based at Measham, Swadlincote, Leicestershire, England, UK, and concerned with the restoration of a part of the Ashby Canal, also known as the Ashby-de-la-Zouch Canal. The restoration project is funded by:

- Leicestershire County Council
- Ashby Canal Association
- Ashby Canal Trust and Ashby Canal Trust Supporters
- Community Foundation
- East Midlands Development Agency
- Inland Waterways Association
- Measham Development Trust
- National Forest Company

Since 2009, the Inland Waterways Association has held an annual National Trailboat Festival on the restored length of the Ashby Canal at Moira, at the most northern end of the canal in Leicestershire. The IWA allocated the Festival there to "showcase the work carried out by the Ashby Canal Trust and raise awareness for the continuing restoration".

== See also ==
- Ashby Canal Association
- National Forest
- List of waterway societies in the United Kingdom
