= Moira Furnace =

Coordinates: 52.732977°N 1.535892°W

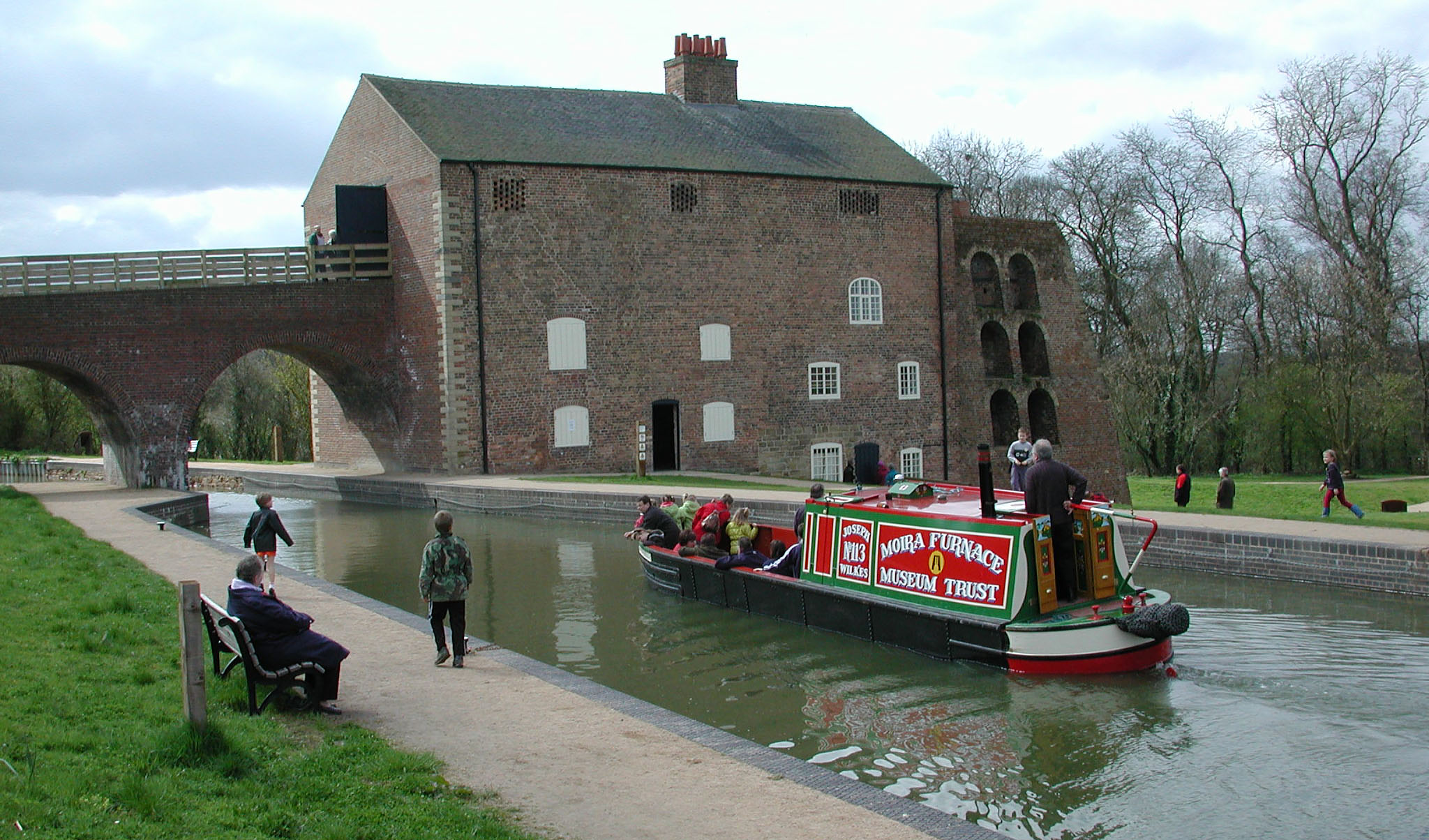
Moira Furnace and the Ashby de la Zouch Canal after restoration

Moira Furnace is a nineteenth-century iron-making blast furnace located in Moira, Leicestershire, on the banks of the Ashby-de-la-Zouch Canal. Built by the Earl of Moira in 1804, the building has been preserved by North West Leicestershire District Council as a museum featuring lime kilns and craft workshops.

It is a most important industrial monument, since it is remarkably well-preserved, and dates from a formative period of the Industrial Revolution.

== Description ==
Moira Furnace was a coke-fuelled, steam-engine blown blast furnace for the smelting of iron from local iron ore, with an attached foundry for the manufacture of cast-iron goods.

The preserved furnace consists of the blast furnace, the attached bridgehouse, and the loading ramp. The blast furnace is the vertical structure with the blank arches at the lowest part of the site. The furnace within was supplied with raw materials (iron ore, coke, and limestone) by tipping them in through a charging port at the top, accessed from the bridgeloft. The loading ramp, which spans the Ashby Canal, allowed the raw materials to be raised into the bridgeloft, which comprises the top floor of the bridgehouse, the large building with the pitched roof behind the furnace. In the bridgeloft the materials were probably weighed and, maybe, mixed before being charged into the furnace.

When the furnace was fired the steam engine blower, now gone, forced a continuous blast of air into the bottom of the furnace in order to make the coke burn brighter and raise the temperature inside high enough to melt the iron (1,538 °C, 2,800 °F). The hot gases exhausted from the low chimney at the top of the furnace. When ready, the molten iron was tapped from the bottom of the furnace and run into moulds to produce pig iron.

Moira Furnace is one of the few remaining blast furnaces from this period of innovation - because it was a commercial failure. Had it been successful then it is highly likely that over time the site would have developed and the first furnace replaced.

== History ==
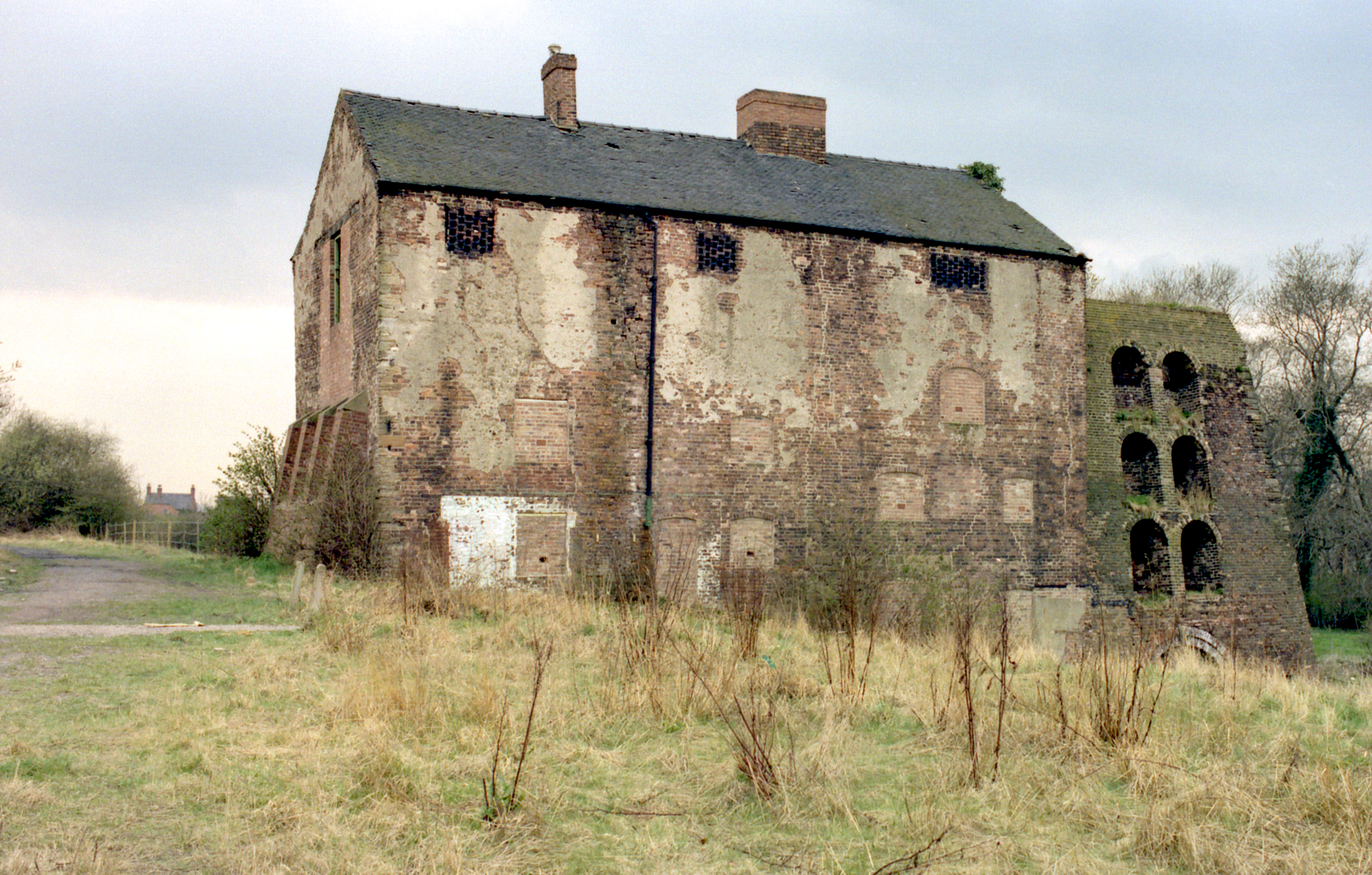
Moira Furnace and the course of the Ashby de la Zouch Canal in 1982, before restoration

In 1804, the Earl of Moira had the furnace constructed to take advantage of the iron ore and abundant coal which were present underground in the surrounding Ashby Woulds area owned by him. The location was chosen for its proximity to the Ashby Canal for transport, and the lie of the land which allowed the furnace to be built low down so the raw materials did not need raising very high.

However, this was a period of development in blast furnace design and some of the features of Moira Furnace do not appear to have been successful. It was brought into blast in 1806, and used intermittently until 1811, though the foundry remained in use until after 1844 by utilising iron brought in from elsewhere.

The historical evidence shows that, although saleable iron was at times produced, over the period that the furnace operated it experienced continual problems. Documents mention bad design, bad construction, bad raw materials, and bad management, but many of the documents were written by individuals trying to divert the blame from themselves. The furnace was abandoned with its final charge still inside, partially smelted. Metallurgical examination has shown a high sulphur content in the raw materials, which may have been a contributory factor, and the chimney shows signs of severe overheating, indicating a design fault or operating problem.

The attached foundry continued to be used for some years, using brought-in pig iron, though it was demolished later in the 19th century. Meanwhile the bridgehouse and the engine house, which was a separate building to the side of the furnace, were converted to dwellings and survived. However, by the 1970s they had become derelict and affected by mining subsidence and the engine house was demolished. After pressure by Philip Riden and from Leicestershire Industrial History Society, the furnace and bridgehouse were scheduled as an ancient monument. The site was acquired by North West Leicestershire District Council in 1981, who sponsored a Community Programme to restore the site and develop it as a museum and country park.

Inside the bridgehouse there is now a museum, operated by the Moira Furnace Museum Trust, which is open regularly. It has information boards and displays about Moira Furnace and the industrial heritage of the area.

The furnace has become a popular site for the detection of paranormal activity by Swadlincote Paranormal Investigations, who first visited the furnace with Richard Felix and Phil Whyman. They hold nocturnal events here, which are open to the public.

== Gallery ==
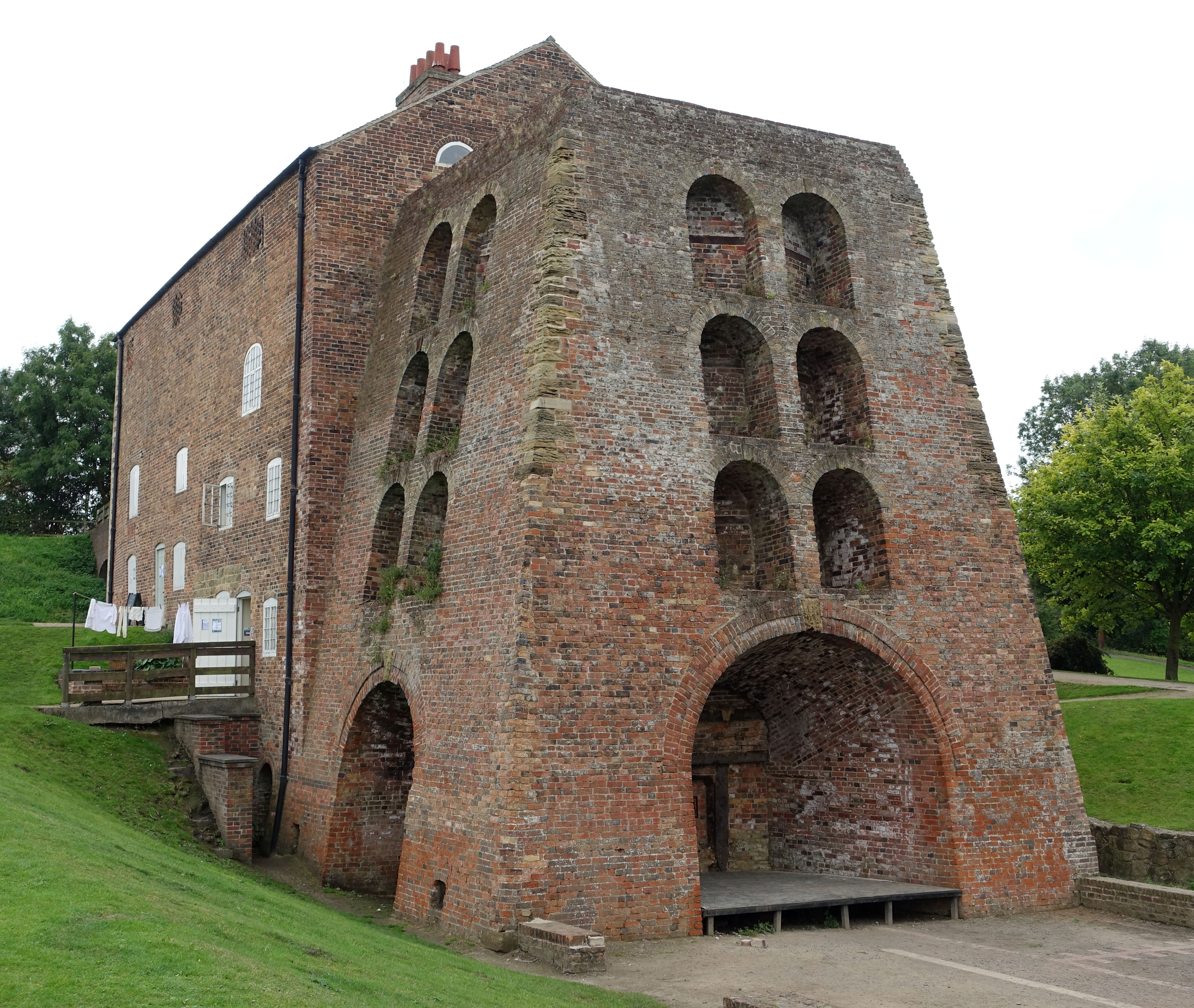
Moira Furnace with the furnace stack at the front and the bridgehouse building at the rear, originally there would have been a casting shed in front of the furnace where the iron 'pigs' were produced

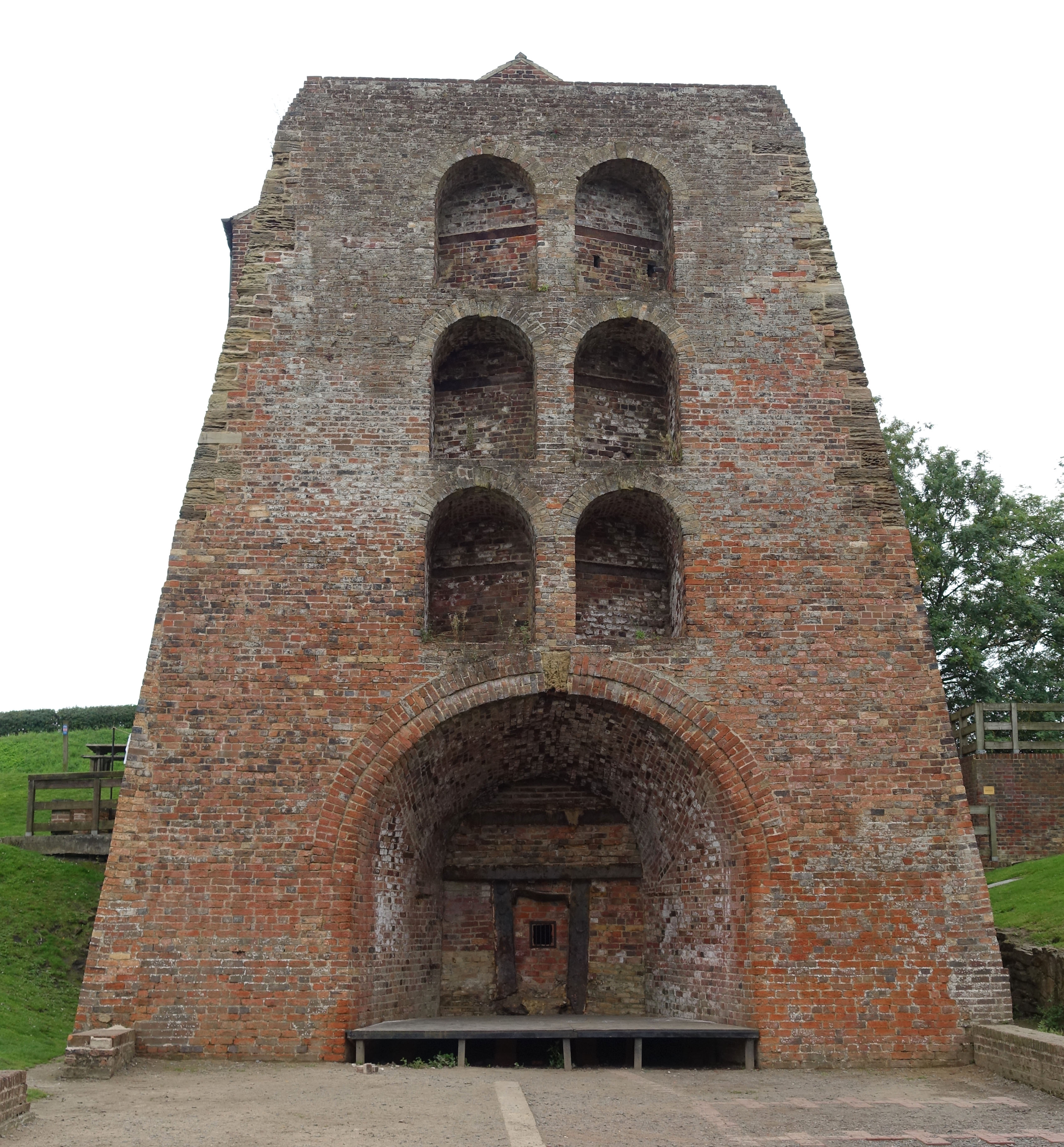
The front of the furnace, with the casting arch and hearth at the bottom

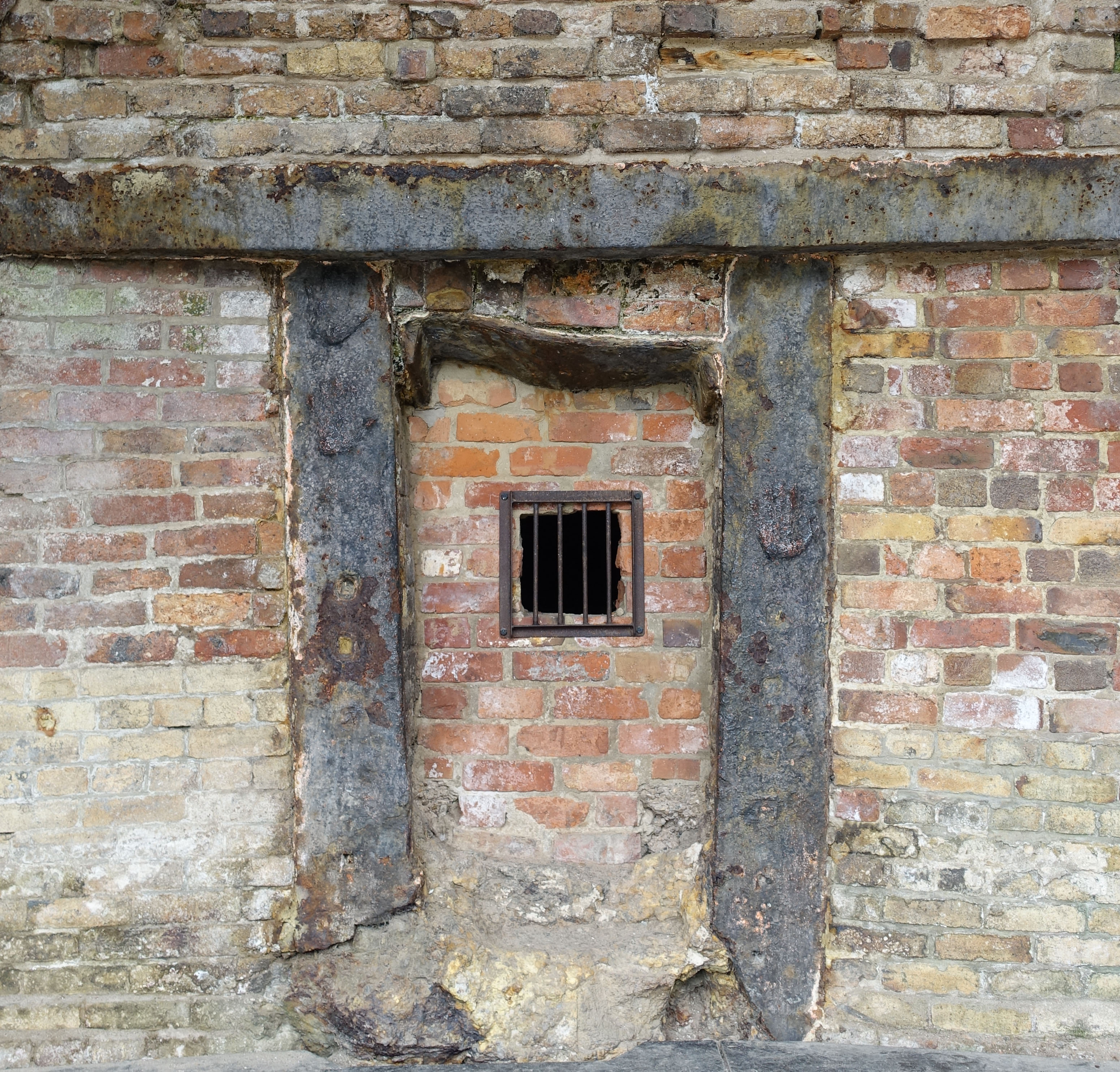
The hearth of the furnace, with the remains of the last failed firing showing as the yellowish mass at the bottom. Of interest are the hand impressions cast into the uprights of the hearth. A hole has been made to allow a view of the now emptied inside of the furnace

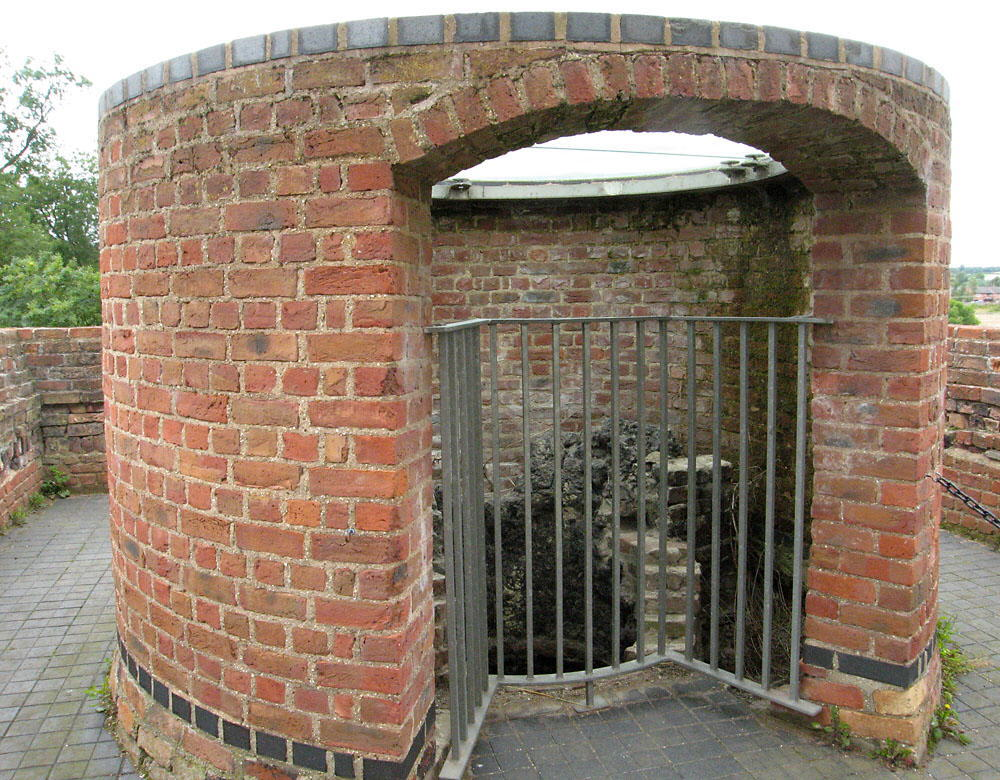
The chimney on top of the furnace. The new outer wall has a gap for viewing the original inner wall (badly damaged by overheating) and down into the furnace

== See also ==
- Ashby-de-la-Zouch Canal
