= Ashby Canal =

Canal in England

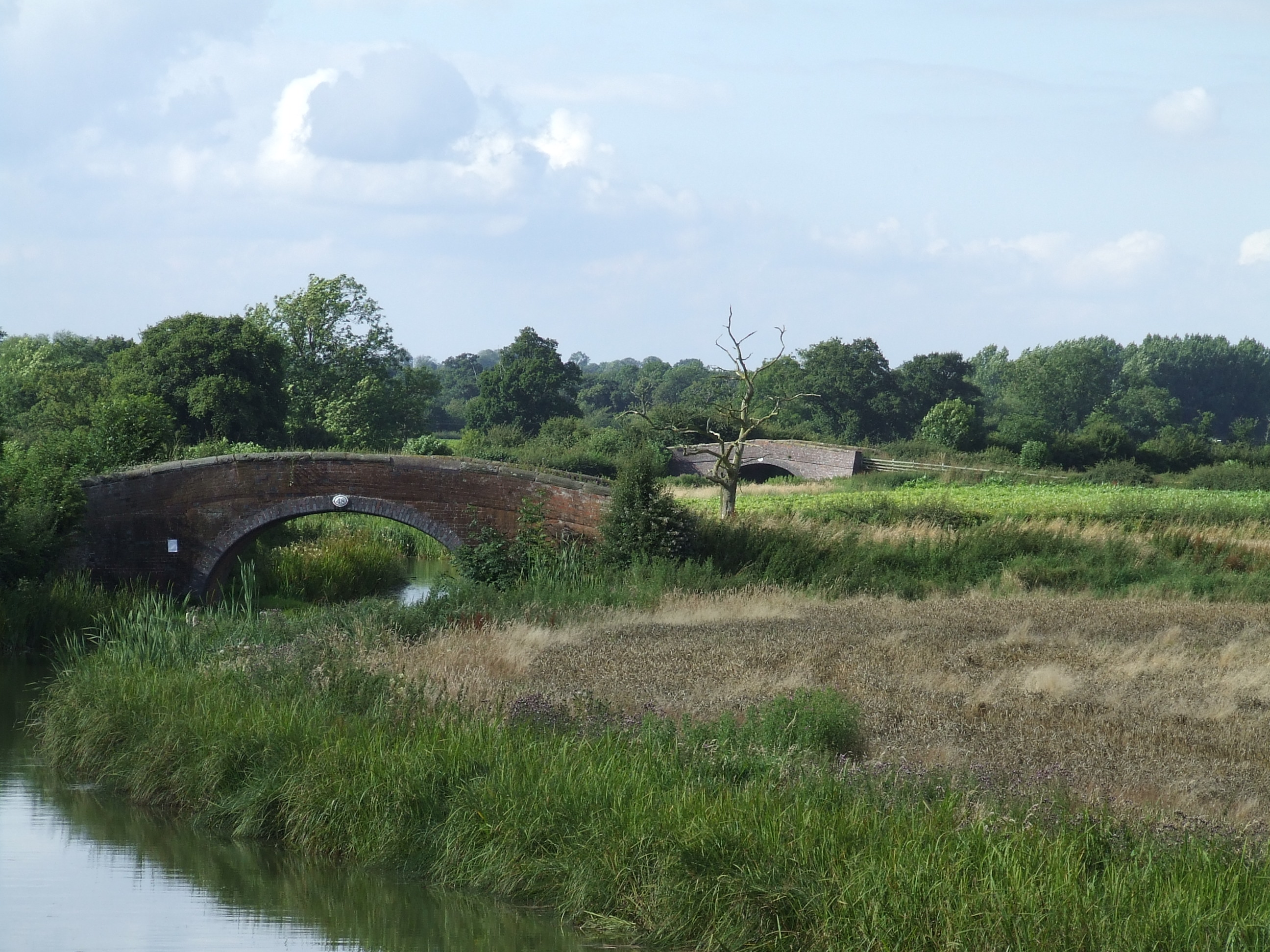
- The canal near Congerstone

Specifications
- Length: 31 miles (50 km)
- Maximum boat length: 72 ft 0 in (21.95 m)
- Maximum boat beam: 7 ft 0 in (2.13 m)
- Status: part open, part under restoration
- Navigation authority: Canal & River Trust

History
- Principal engineer: Robert Whitworth
- Other engineer: Benjamin Outram
- Date of act: 1794
- Date completed: 1804
- Date closed: 1944, 1957, 1966

Geography
- Start point: Ashby-de-la-Zouch
- End point: Marston
- Branch of: Coventry Canal

The Ashby-de-la-Zouch Canal is a 31-mile (50 km) long canal in England which connected the mining district around Moira, just outside the town of Ashby-de-la-Zouch in Leicestershire, with the Coventry Canal at Bedworth in Warwickshire. It was opened in 1804, and a number of tramways were constructed at its northern end, to service collieries. The canal was taken over by the Midland Railway in 1846, but remained profitable until the 1890s, after which it steadily declined. Around 9 miles (14 km) passed through the Leicestershire coal field, and was heavily affected by subsidence, with the result that this section from Moira, southwards to Snarestone, was progressively closed in 1944, 1957 and 1966, leaving 22 miles (35 km) of navigable canal.

The abandoned section is the subject of a restoration project and was the first canal where a new section had been authorised under the Transport and Works Act 1992. The Transport and Works Order was obtained by Leicestershire County Council, as some of the original route had been infilled and built over, and restoration therefore involved construction on a new route through the centre of Measham. It is hoped that all but the final 1-mile (1.6 km) section of the canal can be re-opened. An isolated section near Moira Furnace and the National Forest visitor centre was opened between 1999 and 2005, and is the location for an annual trailboat festival.

== Route ==
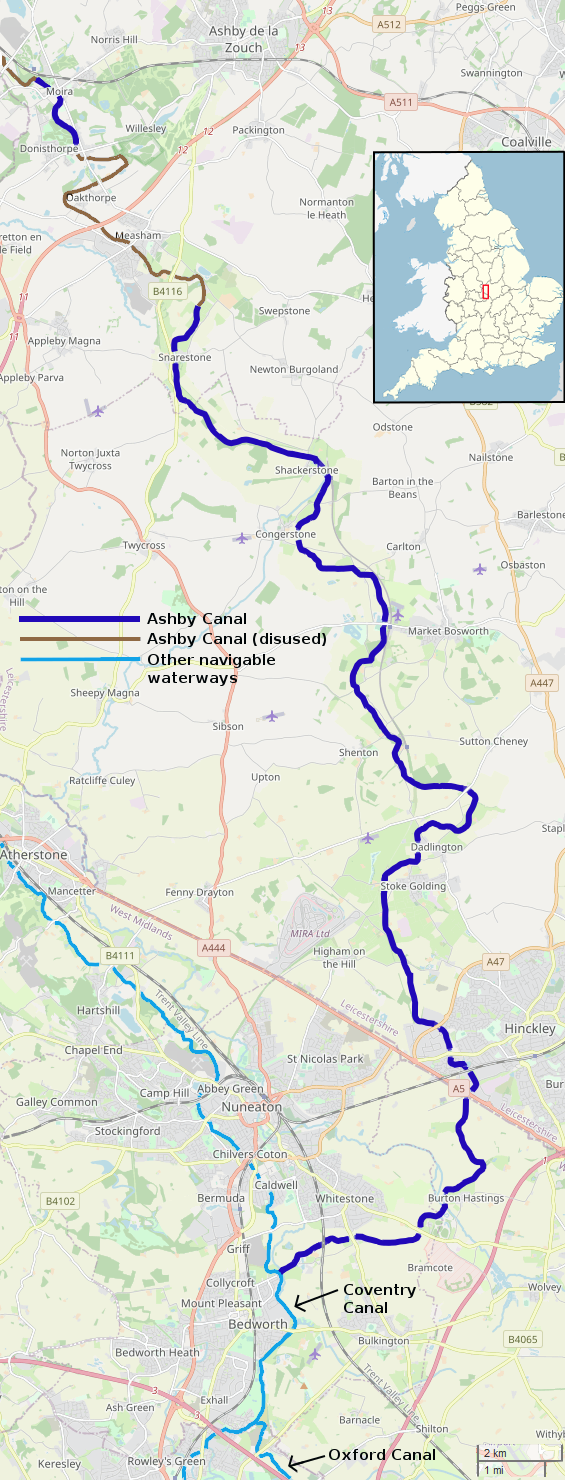
Geographic map of the canal (zoom in to see detail)

The canal starts at a junction with the Coventry Canal just outside Bedworth and travels north-east for about 7 miles (11 km) through the town of Hinckley. It then continues to run north through largely rural and remote countryside for another 15 miles (24 km) until reaching its terminus at Snarestone. Near Sutton Cheney Wharf, it passes the foot of Ambion Hill, the site of the Battle of Bosworth Field. At Shackerstone, it passes the station that is the headquarters of the Battlefield Line Railway.

== History ==
=== Origins ===
In the last half of the 18th century there had been an increasing need for transport to exploit the coal reserves at Ashby Wolds and lime from the quarries north of Ashby-de-la-Zouch. The first proposal was for a canal running from Burton-on-Trent on the upper River Trent to Marston on the Coventry Canal. A second suggestion was for a canal from Ashby Wolds to the Coventry Canal at Griff. Both proposals were made in December 1781. The first was opposed by the Coventry company, though the second was not. Robert Whitworth had estimated the cost of the project at £46,396, but the scheme was dropped a year later. William Jessop proposed a canal and tramway between Breedon and the Trent, with a connecting link to the Trent and Mersey Canal in 1787, which also came to nothing. A proposal in 1790 was well received at the time, but opposition afterwards prevented a bill being submitted to Parliament. Another proposal for a canal northwards to the Trent at Burton was actively discussed between 1791 and 1793. There was wide support for a canal to Griff in 1792, but the muted support of Penn Assheton Curzon, a local landowner and Member of Parliament, led to it being dropped.

Ashby de la Zouch Canal Act 1794
- Act of Parliament
- Parliament of Great Britain
- Long title: An Act for making and maintaining a navigable canal, from the Coventry canal, at or near Marston Bridge, in the parish of Bedworth, in the county of Warwick, to a certain close in the parish of Ashby de la Zouch, in the county of Leicester, and for continuing the same from thence, in one line, to the lime works at Ticknall, in the county of Derby, and in another line to the lime works at Cloudhill, in the said county of Leicester, with certain cuts or branches from the said canal.
- Citation: 34 Geo. 3. c. 93
- Territorial extent: Great Britain

Dates
- Royal assent: 9 May 1794
- Commencement: 9 May 1794 (Note: The Acts of Parliament (Commencement) Act 1793.)

Status: Current legislation

Text of statute as originally enacted

In October 1792, Robert Whitworth revised his plan from 1781. The proposal featured a level canal from Griff, near Nuneaton, to Ashby Wolds, which would cost £63,402. From there it would climb 139 feet (42 m) to a summit which would be supplied with water by a steam pumping engine. After a further 5 miles (8 km), the summit level would descend through 84 feet (26 m) to level branches, which would serve collieries at Ticknall, Coleorton, Cloud Hill, near Breedon-on-the-Hill, and Staunton Harold. The cost of this section would be £82,143. The plans were checked by Jessop, and formed the basis for a bill to authorise a company with powers to raise £150,000 of capital. Hard negotiation with Curzon and the Coventry Canal was required, during which the junction with the Coventry Canal was moved from Griff to Marston, but the bill finally became an act of Parliament, the Ashby de la Zouch Canal Act 1794 (34 Geo. 3. c. 93), in May 1794. Whitworth and his son, also called Robert, were appointed as engineers in July, and construction began. (Robert Whitworth was later remembered with the naming in 2002 of Whitworth Avenue on the new George Wimpey development in Hinckley, which overlooks the Ashby Canal).

=== Construction ===
By October 1796, it had become obvious that the costs of construction had been seriously underestimated. In addition, around one quarter of the shareholders had not honoured their pledges, and so the company had less capital than expected. The company decided that the only solution was to replace the branch canals with tramways. For a brief time at the start of 1797, the company investigated the possibility of extending the canal to the River Trent at Burton-on-Trent, and building tramways from the quarries to the river. Amalgamation with the Trent Navigation was considered, but the plans failed due to the lack of capital. In May 1797, Robert Whitworth Jr. became ill, and the Whitworths were replaced by Thomas Newbold. An investigation at that time into the state of the collieries at Ashby Wolds revealed that they were unlikely to be producing coal by the time the canal opened. By March the following year, the top section from Ashby Wolds to Market Bosworth was operational.

The company had been considering the option of building tramways since 1793, and finally asked Newbold to investigate the possible lines for railways which would serve the canal at Ashby Wolds in June 1798. They then asked Benjamin Outram to advise, and he reported in September. He suggested running the lines to Willesley Basin rather than Ashby Wolds, as this route would cost over £8,000 less. The lines as built ran from the basin through Ashby to a junction at Old Parks, where one branch ran through Lount to Cloud Hill, replacing the proposed canal and its diversion through Coleorton. The other branch led from Old Parks to Ticknall, with branches to the quarries between Calke Abbey and Staunton Harold. The total length of the lines was around 12 1/2 miles (20 km).

In 1799, Outram had discussions with the company about the gauge of the tramways, and although lines at Crich and for the Derby Canal used a gauge of 3 ft 6 in (1,067 mm), he recommended that it should be made wider, at 4 ft 2 in (1,270 mm), forecasting that, within a few years, railways would be the principal mode of transport for merchandise. The wider gauge would increase the cost of tunnels and bridges, but only by £785 on a final contract price of £29,500. His quotation was accepted, although repeated requests by Outram for his contract to be signed were ignored.

Outram's engineer for the line was John Hodgkinson who was experienced in the work, but problems arose because the committee insisted that it should proceed on all sections of the line simultaneously, which made supervision difficult. Moreover, perennially short of money, they were dilatory in making decisions and providing funds, which caused Outram problems at his Butterley Works as he was having to refuse contracts, so that he could be ready to provide the canal with material, as and when it was authorised. During this period of delay, the labour costs and the price of iron also rose. Even though Outram's experience of his treatment by the canal proprietors must have spoilt his satisfaction on the completion of the lines, they were arguably a major achievement and a model for railways in the future.

=== Later history ===
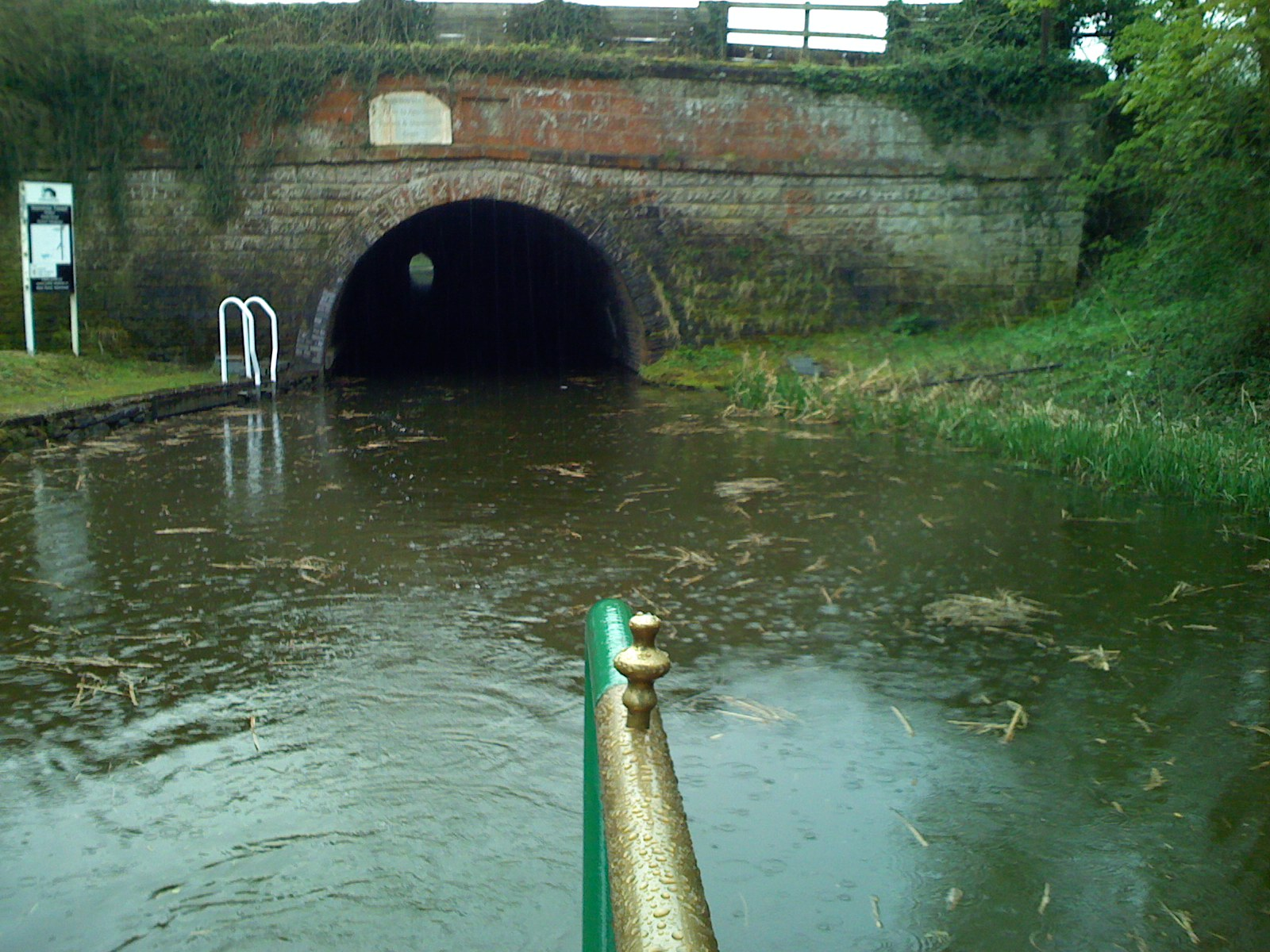
Snarestone Tunnel, just before the present terminus, is crooked in the middle

The tramways were completed towards the end of 1802, and the level section of the canal from Marston to Moira was opened on 19 April 1804. The only lock was a stop lock at Marston, to protect the water supplies. By this time, the finances were not in good shape, as failures of the shareholders to honour calls on the shares had resulted in the company borrowing £21,539 to complete the work, and the mines were still not producing coal at a rate which would have made the canal profitable. The final cost of construction was around £184,070. The main source of traffic was from the pits at Moira, which steadily expanded, particularly in the 1820s, enabling the loans to be paid off between 1820 and 1827, and the first dividend to be paid in 1828. In 1819, the company and the Coventry Canal agreed to convert the stop lock between the canals so that it was only suitable for narrow boats, and they shared the cost of conversion. The reasons for this are unclear, since wide-beamed boats continued to operate on the canal, but could not move further afield. Profitability was improved after the company sent Crossley, their engineer, on a fact-finding tour of local canals in 1822. He investigated tolls for coal, and the system of drawbacks which some of them used. Such a system was them implemented on the Ashby, whereby coal travelling the whole length of the canal was subject to a refund or drawback on the tolls. The effect was immediate, with the amount of coal qualifying for the drawback rising five-fold between 1824 and 1828, from 4,367 to 22,011 tons, and reaching 37,316 tons in 1837.

In 1823, there were calls for tramways to be built from the head of the canal to Swadlincote and Church Gresley. It took the committee two and a half years to decide to proceed, and the 3-mile (4.8 km) Swadlincote Railway was opened on 21 July 1827. It was built with double tracks, and used edge rails, similar to modern railways, rather than the L-shaped tram plates of the Willesley system. The cost of £4,262 was financed by a mortgage, which was paid off less than a year after opening. The Ticknall branch was extended in 1829, when a line from it to Dimsdale was authorised and built. The Coleorton Railway, which was run by an independent company, and used edge rails, opened in 1833. Negotiations between the two companies resulted in a connecting line being built between Cloud Hill and Worthington Rough, which used a type of rail called a "rib rail", where the vertical flange of Outram's L-shaped rail was made much wider, so that wagons with flanged wheels could use it as an edge rail. The Ashby engineer was asked to prepare a quotation for the conversion of the entire Willesley system to rib rails in 1837, but there is no record as to whether this work was carried out.

=== Railway ownership ===
In 1845, the Midland Railway were planning to build the Atherstone, Ashby-de-la-Zouch and Burton-on-Trent railway, and offered to buy the canal for £110,000. They agreed to maintain the canal until the railway was built, but there was no longer-term agreement on its future. Since most of the coal which used the canal travelled onwards via the Coventry Canal and the Oxford Canal, these companies faced a big drop in toll revenues, and fought hard to get the Midland Railway's bill amended. As well as a commitment to maintaining the canal, they also had a clause added which allowed the Coventry Canal to undertake maintenance and charge the railway for the work if the railway company failed in their obligations. An act of Parliament, the Midland Railway (No. 2) Act 1846 (9 & 10 Vict. c. cciii) was passed, which authorised the takeover, but the railway line as envisioned was not built. It was nearly 30 years later that serious railway competition arrived, when the London and North Western Railway and the Midland Railway jointly opened the Ashby and Nuneaton Joint Railway from Overseal to Nuneaton in 1873. The following year, the Midland reused the section of tramway from Ashby to Worthington, Leicestershire, enlarging the Old Parks tunnel, as part of a line that ran through Melbourne to Derby. The remainder of the tramway lines were kept for local use, with the branch to Ticknall closing in 1915.

The canal continued to carry significant tonnages, which gradually decreased, from 138,117 tons in 1862 to 113,659 tons in 1882. After that, the decline was more rapid, dropping to 33,329 tons by 1893. By the 1890s, the railway owners had reduced maintenance on the canal, knowing that the Coventry Canal were unlikely to invoke their powers under the Midland Railway (No. 2) Act 1846, since they too were in trouble. On 2 January 1918, there was a major breach in the canal when an embankment some 2 miles (3.2 km) below Moira collapsed. The cost of reinstatement was £9,864, and the canal reopened on 23 July 1919. The upper section was increasingly affected by subsidence from the coal mining. Despite this, the Moira Coal Company shipped 20,807 tons along the canal in 1943, and the total tonnage on the canal that year was 43,733 tons. The owners, by now the London, Midland and Scottish Railway (LMS), tried to give the canal to the Coventry Canal Company in 1944, but they refused it unless there was money to fund the maintenance. The 2 1/2-mile (4 km) section from Moira to Donisthorpe was promptly abandoned by the London Midland and Scottish Railway (Canals) Act 1944 (8 & 9 Geo. 6. c. ii), allowing the Moira Coal Company to mine under its course. Another 5 miles (8 km) were closed in 1957, under an act of Parliament, the British Transport Commission Act 1957 (5 & 6 Eliz. 2. c. xxxiii) obtained by the British Transport Commission, and the Measham to Snarestone section was closed in 1966, even though coal was regularly loaded there.

Traces of the old railway can still be seen, particularly towards Ticknall. A low embankment, still with some stone sleeper blocks crosses a field and a tunnel passes under the drive to Calke Abbey. There is also an arch bridge in Ticknall village where the line ran into the quarries.

== Restoration ==
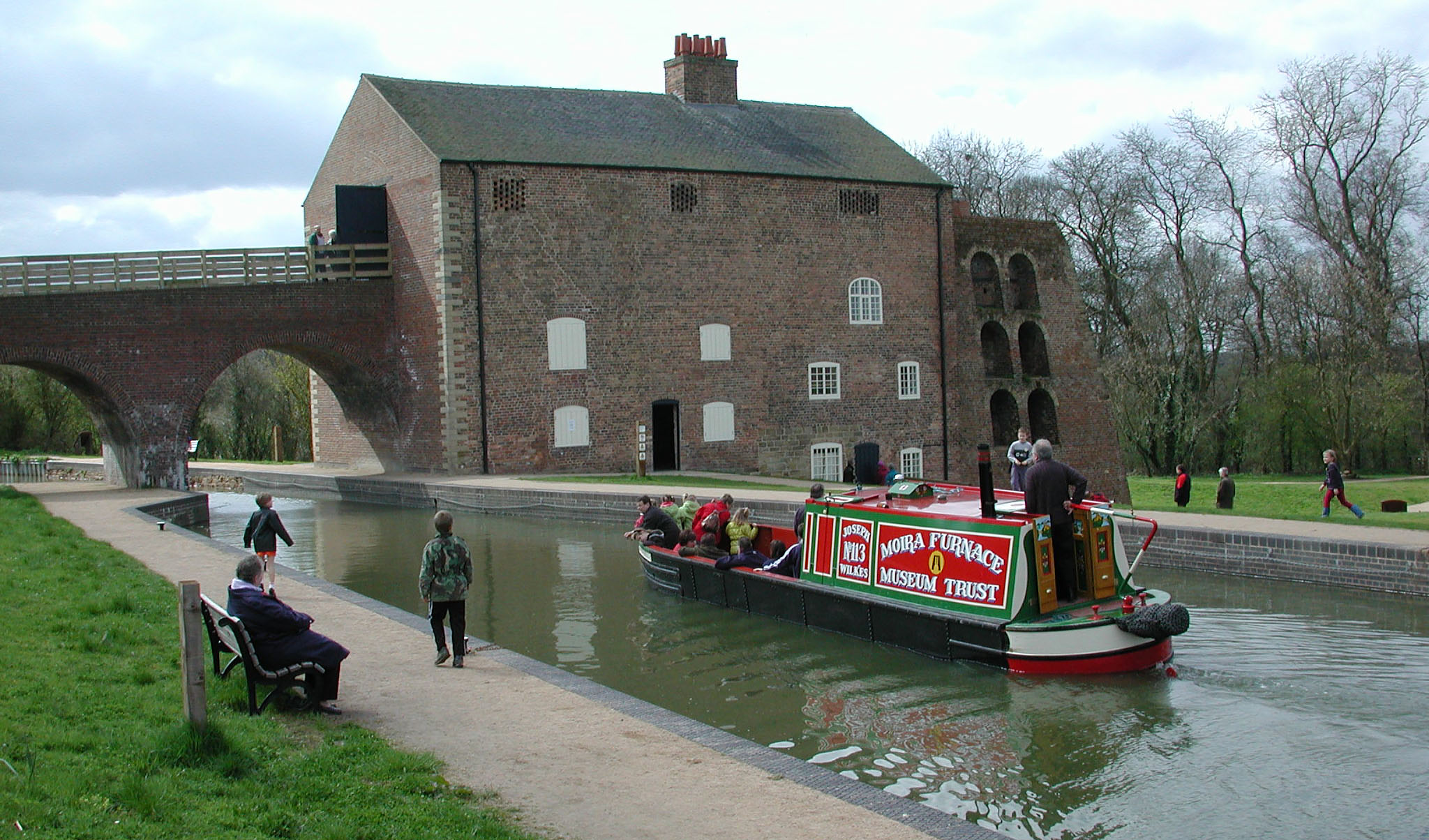
The restored section of the Ashby de la Zouch Canal alongside Moira Furnace, now a museum.

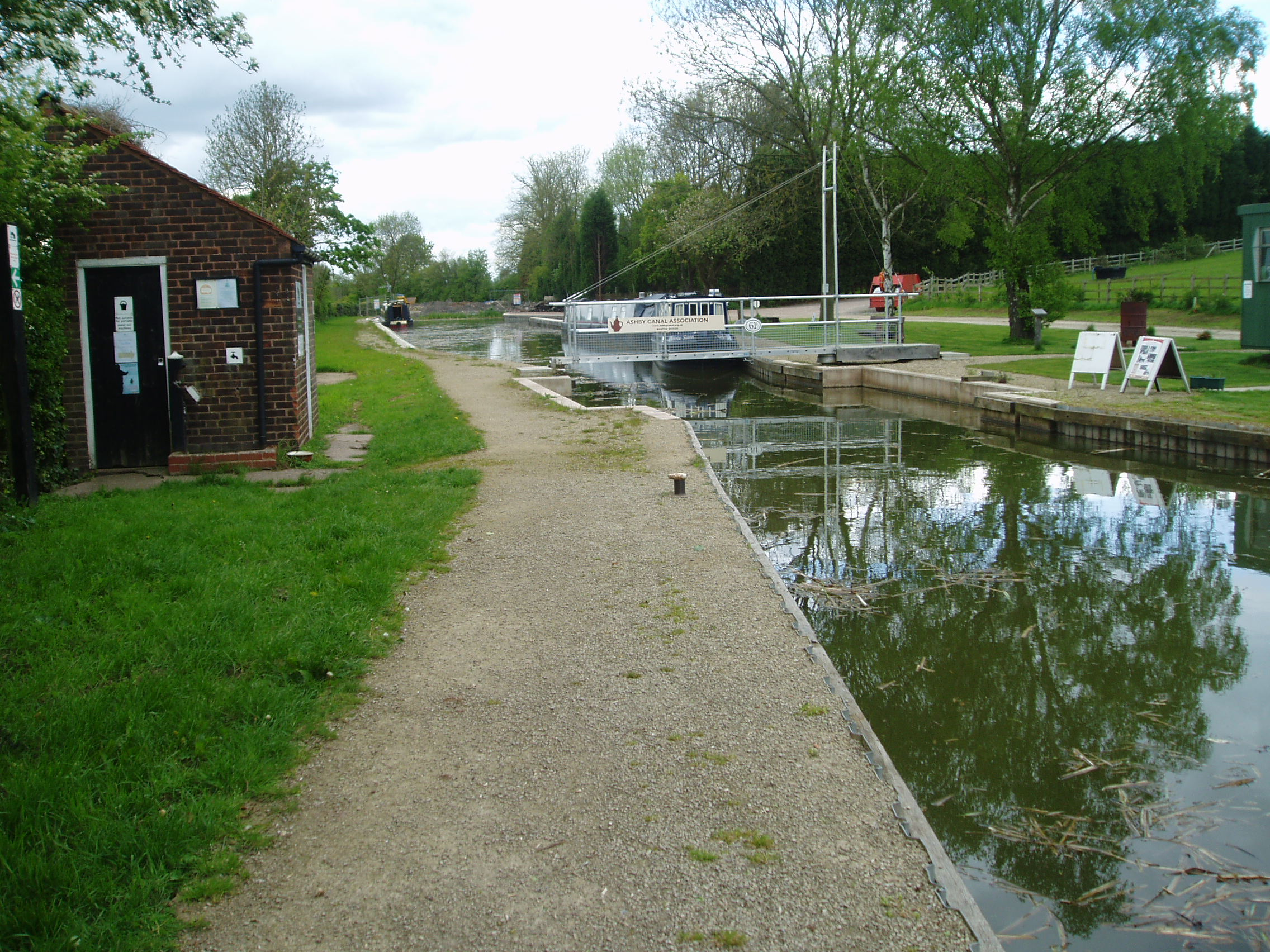
The short new section of canal at Snarestone excavated in 2010. Beyond the bend at the far end, work started on the next section in 2012.

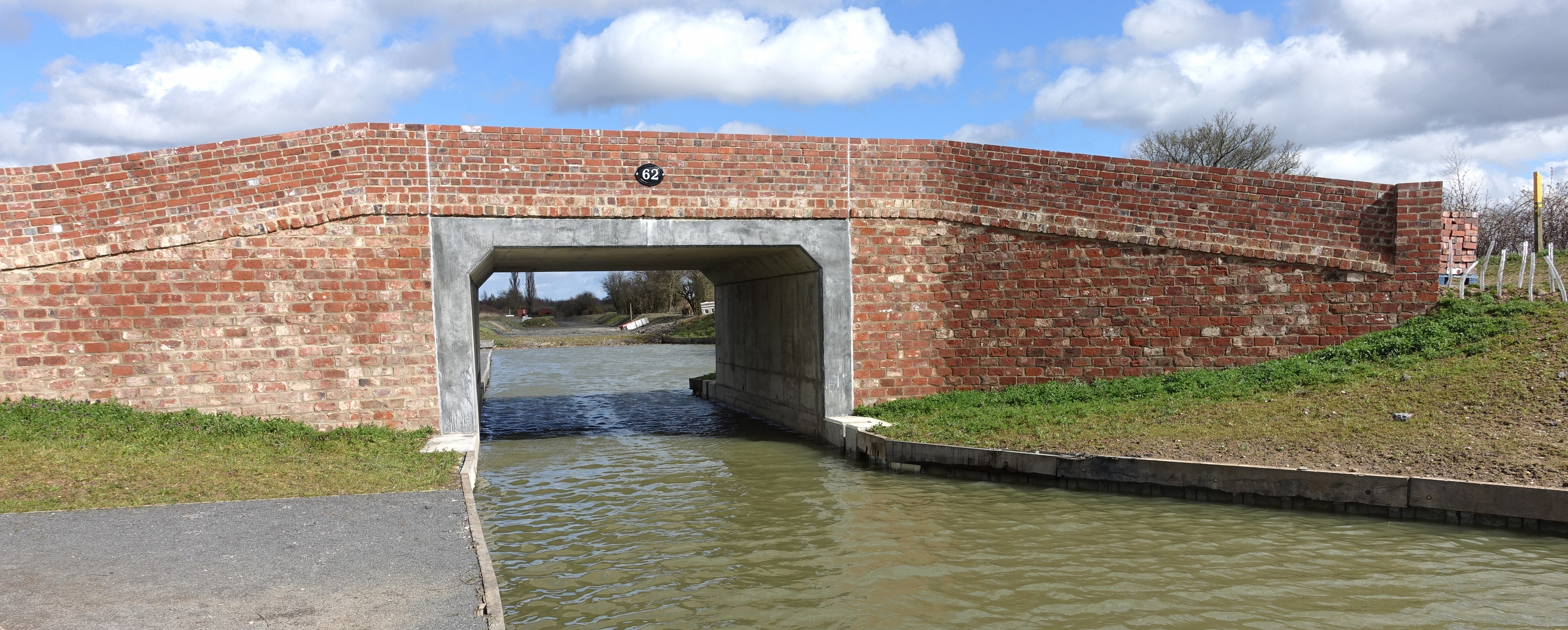
The reconstructed bridge 62 and the winding hole beyond formed the limit of restoration from Snarestone in March 2016.

The closure of the canal north of Snarestone in 1966 led to the formation of the Ashby Canal Association, to ensure that no more was closed and to work towards the reopening of the northern section. In 1992, the engineering consultants W. S. Atkins produced a feasibility study for the restoration of the canal between Snarestone and Moira, which concluded that there were no obstacles which could not be resolved. They also recommended that the reconstruction should be suitable for broad-beam boats, rather than 7-foot (2.1 m) narrow boats, as this would have ecological advantages. By 1997, Leicestershire County Council had bought much of the route, and had located two funding packages worth over £1 million. However, they failed to reach agreement with one landowner over the purchase of a parcel of land, and because the deadlines were not met, the funding was lost. They therefore resolved to obtain an order under the Transport and Works Act 1992, which would allow them to use compulsory purchase powers if necessary. In order to promote and assist the restoration of the canal north of Snarestone, the Ashby Canal Trust was set up in 2000. It is a limited company, with directors representing the Ashby Canal Association, the Canal & River Trust, Hinckley and Bosworth Borough Council, the Inland Waterways Association, Leicestershire County Council and North West Leicestershire District Council.

Since the mining industry in the area has ceased, there have been fewer problems with subsidence, and the current plans are to re-open the canal to the National Forest visitor centre at Moira, about 1 mile (1.6 km) short of its original terminus at Spring Cottage. Between 1999 and 2005, a stretch of the canal near Moira was restored and re-filled with water, passing the historic Moira Furnace, a blast furnace from the 19th century which has been converted to provide visitor facilities including a craft centre, museum and cafe. The restored stretch is some 1 1/2 miles (2.4 km) long, and includes a new lock built to overcome the problems caused by mining subsidence. Below the restored section, the way forward has been blocked by the construction of the A42 main road across the canal's formation. In November 2004, a public enquiry was held in connection with the application for a Transport and Works Order. Most objections were withdrawn, leaving one from English Nature, which was accommodated by including a provision for off-line nature reserves, and the Order was granted in October 2005.

The Order allows Leicestershire County Council to purchase land and construct 2 1/2 miles (4 km) of canal from Snarestone to Measham. Initially, this would follow the original route, but would diverge near Measham, to use the track of a redundant railway. The new canal would pass through Measham Station and cross the High Street on an aqueduct. The Transport and Works Act Order was introduced by the British Parliament in 1992 as a way of simplifying the legal processes for railway and canal projects, and works which interfere with navigation rights. Although a number of railway projects had previously been authorised under this legislation, the Ashby Canal Order obtained by Leicestershire County Council was the first time that construction of a canal had been authorised in this way. Purchase of the land between Snarestone and Measham had been completed by 2010. Re-construction of the first 100 yards (91 m) of the infilled section began on 26 February 2009, after a grant from the East Midlands Development Agency was secured. The £0.5 million project involved the provision of a stop lock, a new slipway, an improved winding hole and a wetland nature reserve, running parallel to the canal and connected to it. The stop lock chamber marks the division between the part of the canal owned by the Canal & River Trust, and that owned by Leicestershire County Council, although no gates have been fitted while the length of canal beyond the chamber is short.

=== Progress ===
On 23 June 2011, Leicestershire County Council reached agreement with UK Coal for them to extract coal and fireclay at their Minorca Opencast site near Measham. As part of the planning gain, UK Coal will alter Gallows Lane to allow the new canal to pass under it, will provide a water storage lake, reducing the cost of the next phase by £1 million, and will provide £1.28 million to fund the reconstruction of the section north of Snarestone. They will also make available any clay removed from the site which is suitable for puddling the new section of waterway. Work on the extension towards Measham has been undertaken by contractors and volunteers, including members of the Waterway Recovery Group. In 2015, bridge 62, once known as Faulks Bridge, was reinstated, and a 50-foot (15 m) winding hole was constructed just beyond it, enabling boats to use the new section. The bridge is located about 1/4 mile (0.40 km) from the site of Gilwiskaw Aqueduct, which will be the next major structure to reinstate.

In 2013, parts of the restoration were threatened when the plans for the route of High Speed 2 (HS2), a high-speed rail link which would connect London to Birmingham, Manchester and York, were published. The new line would have cut through the middle of Measham, where a major development consisting of 450 houses, together with restoration of 1/2 mile (0.8 km) of the original route of the canal and the construction of a canal basin, was put on hold. Revised plans, published on 15 November 2016, routed the railway further to the east, crossing the line of the canal on a viaduct. As a result, the chairman of the Ashby Canal Association, Peter Oakden, expected work on the development to start in the summer of 2017, and was hopeful that the extension of the canal to link up with the Measham Wharf development could be completed by 2021, before any work on the rail link was likely to begin. However on 17 July 2017 the revised route of HS2 was rejected by the Secretary of State and a new final route within 85 yards (80 m) of the original 2013 proposal was confirmed. This route runs through the planned area for the 450 houses, causing the developers to cancel the development, and therefore the canal reinstatement in Measham, as unviable. In the longer term however, the latest HS2 route through Measham and the consequential moving of the A42 dual carriageway, should allow bridges to be built, funded by the HS2 project, for the canal to cross under both HS2 and the A42 when reinstated between Measham and Moira.

In 2020, the process of transferring the Transport and Works Order from Leicestershire County Council to the Ashby Canal Association was almost complete when it was interrupted by the onset of the COVID-19 pandemic. Once the transfer is completed, the association can proceed with further restoration work.

== Site of Special Scientific Interest ==
The 6-mile (9.7 km) stretch between Carlton Bridge, north of Market Bosworth, and Turnover Bridge, north of Snarestone is a 15.4-hectare (38-acre) biological Site of Special Scientific Interest in Leicestershire, designated in 1989. The site has diverse aquatic flora and invertebrates, and the submerged plants are of particular interest. These include mare's tail, spiked water-milfoil and perfoliate pondweed. Nine species of dragonfly have been recorded, and there are also water shrews and the nationally rare water beetle Haliplus mucronatus. In 2013, the Canal and River Trust received a grant of nearly £20,000 from Natural England to enable them to tackle invasive species such as mink, terrapins, zander, Japanese knotweed and giant hogweed.

== Coordinates ==
Point	Coordinates (Links to map resources)	OS Grid Ref	Notes
North terminus, Moira	52.739°N 1.542°W	SK310158	
Current north terminus	52.686°N 1.489°W	SK346099	
Snarestone tunnel	52.681°N 1.495°W	SK342093	
Canal near Shackerstone	52.659°N 1.446°W	SK375069	
A47 road crossing	52.541°N 1.405°W	SP404938	
Southern terminus	52.490°N 1.459°W	SP368881	

== See also ==
- Ashby Canal Association
- Ashby Canal Trust
- Moira Furnace
- Ticknall Tramway

== Bibliography ==
- Clinker, C. R.; Hadfield, C. (1978). The Ashby-de-la-Zouch Canal and its Railways (PDF). Bristol: Avon-Anglia Publications & Services. Reprinted from (1958) the Transactions of the Leicestershire Archaeological and Historical Society. doi:10.5284/1107845. ISBN 978-0-905466-16-3.
- Cumberlidge, Jane (2009). Inland Waterways of Great Britain (8th Ed.). Imray Laurie Norie and Wilson. ISBN 978-1-84623-010-3.
- Hadfield, Charles (1970). The Canals of the East Midlands. David and Charles. ISBN 0-7153-4871-X.
- LCC (July 2009). "Ashby Canal Restoration Business Plan Summary" (PDF). Leicester County Council. Archived from the original (PDF) on 3 March 2016.
- Potter, Hugh (November 2010). "The Other Northern Reaches". Waterways World. 39 (11). ISSN 0309-1422.
- Squires, Roger (2008). Britain's restored canals. Landmark Publishing. ISBN 978-1-84306-331-5.
