= Ashby Canal Association =

Waterway society in the England

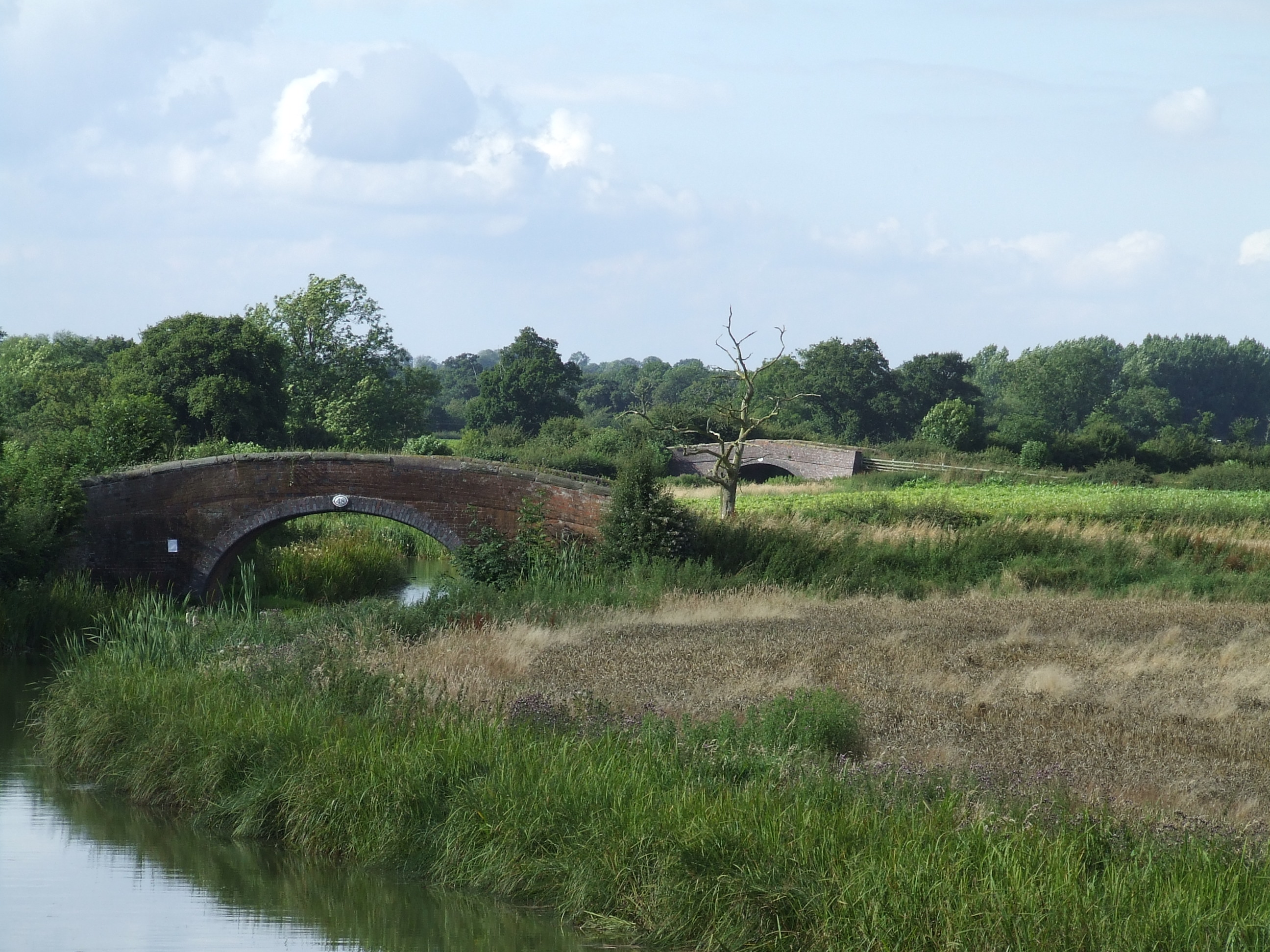
Ashby Canal near Congerstone

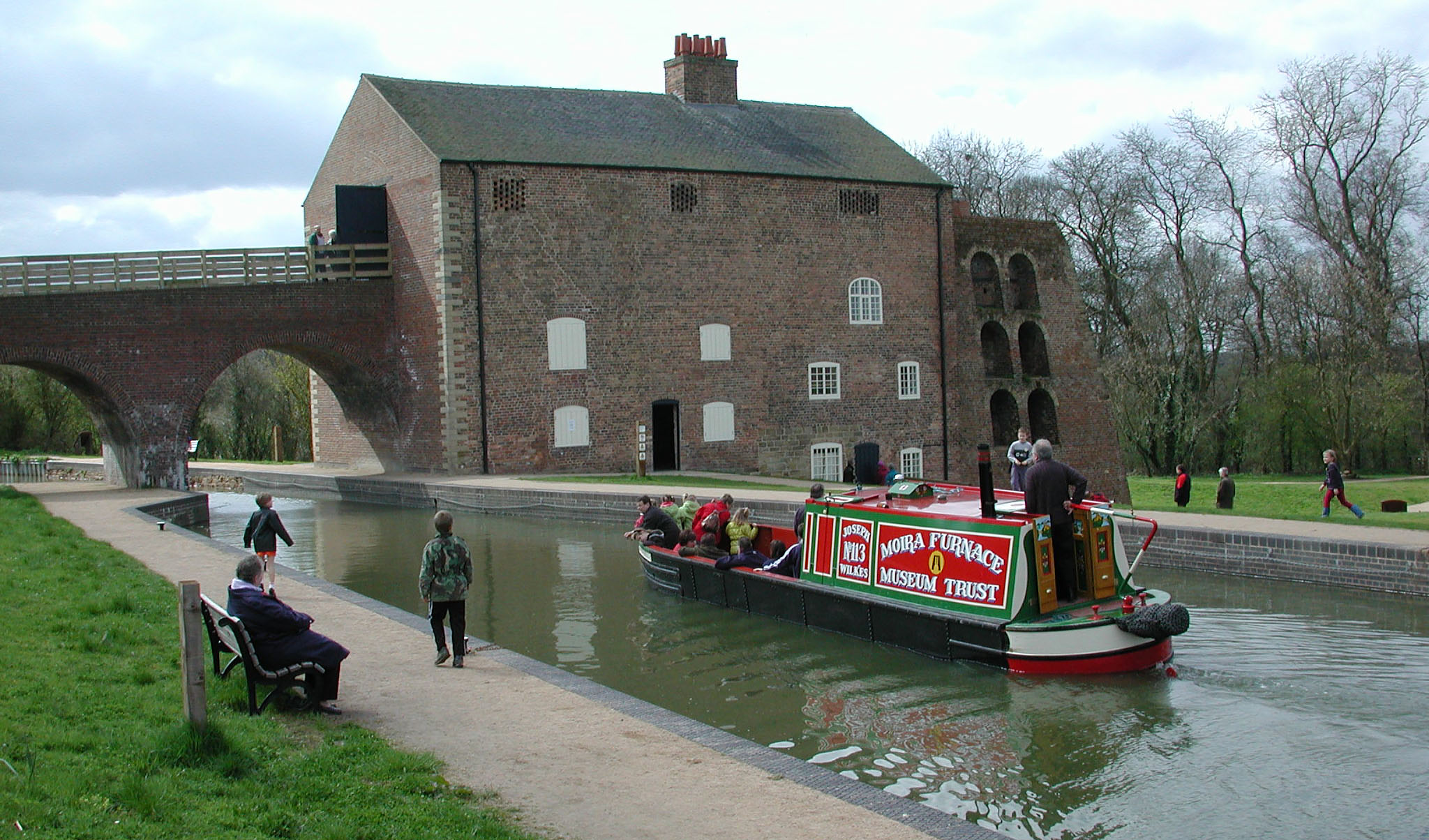
Moira Furnace, Ashby-de-la-Zouch Canal

The Ashby Canal Association (ACA) is a waterway society and a registered charity, in Leicestershire and Staffordshire, England, concerned with the Ashby Canal, and affiliated to the Inland Waterways Association.

The Association was founded in 1966 in response to the closure of the northern eight miles of the Ashby Canal. The Association's work parties are active in the restoration and reconnection to the main waterway, in partnership with the Ashby Canal Trust.

== See also ==
- Ashby Canal Trust
- List of waterway societies in the United Kingdom
- National Forest
