= Hinckley and Bosworth Borough Council elections =

Local government elections in Leicestershire, England

Hinckley and Bosworth Borough Council elections are held every four years. Hinckley and Bosworth Borough Council is the local authority for the non-metropolitan district of Hinckley and Bosworth in Leicestershire, England. Since the last boundary changes in 2003, 34 councillors are elected from 16 wards.

== Council elections ==
- 1973 Hinckley and Bosworth Borough Council election
- 1976 Hinckley and Bosworth Borough Council election
- 1979 Hinckley and Bosworth Borough Council election
- 1983 Hinckley and Bosworth Borough Council election (New ward boundaries)
- 1984 Hinckley and Bosworth Borough Council election
- 1986 Hinckley and Bosworth Borough Council election (Borough boundary changes took place but the number of seats remained the same)
- 1987 Hinckley and Bosworth Borough Council election
- 1991 Hinckley and Bosworth Borough Council election (Borough boundary changes took place but the number of seats remained the same)
- 1995 Hinckley and Bosworth Borough Council election
- 1999 Hinckley and Bosworth Borough Council election
- 2003 Hinckley and Bosworth Borough Council election (New ward boundaries)
- 2007 Hinckley and Bosworth Borough Council election
- 2011 Hinckley and Bosworth Borough Council election
- 2015 Hinckley and Bosworth Borough Council election
- 2019 Hinckley and Bosworth Borough Council election
- 2023 Hinckley and Bosworth Borough Council election

== Election results ==
	Overall control	Conservative	Labour	Lib Dem
2023	Lib Dem	10	2	22
2019	Lib Dem	11	2	21
2015	Conservative	21	1	12
2011	Lib Dem	15	1	18
2007	Lib Dem	13	2	19
2003	Conservative	20	6	8

== Results maps ==
2003 results map

2007 results map

2011 results map

2015 results map

2019 results map

2023 results map

== By-election results ==
=== 1995-1999 ===
Groby By-Election 24/09/1998
Party	Candidate	Votes	%	±%
Conservative	John Collins	598	42.7	+5.0
Liberal Democrats	Mary Pringle	462	33.0	+12.8
Labour	Stephen Hunnybun	339	24.2	−17.9
Majority		136	9.7	
Turnout		1,399	24.0	
Conservative hold		Swing		

=== 1999-2003 ===
Clarendon By-Election 23/03/2000
Party	Candidate	Votes	%	±%
Liberal Democrats	Stuart Bray	853	59.2	+2.8
Conservative	Arthur Noon	353	24.5	−0.3
Labour	Jane Wilkins	142	9.9	−8.8
Independent	P J Hagan	57	4.0	+4.0
Independent	Mike Hall	35	2.4	+2.4
Majority		500	34.7	
Turnout		1,440	19.0	
Liberal Democrats hold		Swing		

Desford and Peckleton By-Election 12/12/2002
Party	Candidate	Votes	%	±%
Liberal Democrats	Dianne Finney	655	50.1	−0.6
Conservative	Ruth Camamile	540	41.3	−8.0
Labour	T Murray	113	8.6	+8.6
Majority		115	8.8	
Turnout		1,308	33.3	
Liberal Democrats gain from Conservative		Swing		

=== 2003-2007 ===
Barwell By-Election 12/08/2004
Party	Candidate	Votes	%	±%
Liberal Democrats	Sandra Franks	739	45.7	+45.7
Conservative	Allan Keddy	448	27.7	−25.1
Labour	Andre Wheeler	244	15.1	−32.1
BNP	Mike Shore	187	11.6	+11.6
Majority		291	18.0	
Turnout		1,618	27.6	
Liberal Democrats gain from Conservative		Swing		

Groby By-Election 06/10/2005
Party	Candidate	Votes	%	±%
Conservative	Peter Batty	785	43.4	−18.5
Liberal Democrats	Kenneth Charles Long	545	30.1	+30.1
BNP	Robert Crane	247	13.7	+13.7
Independent	John Hagen	232	12.8	−6.2
Majority		240	13.3	
Turnout		1,809	33.6	
Conservative hold		Swing		

=== 2007-2011 ===
Hinckley Castle By-Election 24 April 2008
Party	Candidate	Votes	%	±%
Liberal Democrats	Bronwen Witherford	802	57.0	−10.0
BNP	Mike Shore	264	18.8	+18.8
Conservative	Ian Coe	226	16.1	−8.7
Labour	Clark Mitchell	116	8.2	+0.0
Majority		538	38.2	
Turnout		1,408	29.6	
Liberal Democrats hold		Swing		

Markfield, Stanton and Fieldhead By-Election 13 November 2008
Party	Candidate	Votes	%	±%
Conservative		637	35.2	−0.1
Labour		521	28.8	−11.7
Liberal Democrats		390	21.5	+12.8
BNP		263	14.5	−1.0
Majority		116	6.4	
Turnout		1,811		
Conservative hold		Swing		

=== 2015-2019 ===
Burbage Sketchley and Stretton By-Election 5 October 2017
Party	Candidate	Votes	%	±%
Conservative	David Macdonald	822	39.0	−4.6
Liberal Democrats	Robert Mayne	785	37.3	+8.3
Labour	Christina Emmett	321	15.2	+2.0
UKIP	Neale Smith	120	5.7	−8.5
Independent	Danny Findlay	57	2.7	+2.7
Majority		37	1.8	
Turnout		2,105		
Conservative hold		Swing		
