= 2003 Hinckley and Bosworth Borough Council election =

2003 UK local government election

Results of the 2003 Hinckley and Bosworth Borough Council election

Elections to Hinckley and Bosworth Borough Council were held on 1 May 2003. The whole council was up for election, with boundary changes having taken place since the last election in 1999. The Conservative Party took overall control of the council.

== Election result ==
Hinckley & Bosworth local election result 2003
Party	Seats	Gains	Losses	Net gain/loss	Seats %	Votes %	Votes	+/−
Conservative	20			+9	58.8			
Liberal Democrats	8			-6	23.5			
Labour	6			-3	17.6			

== Ward results ==
Groby (2)
Party	Candidate	Votes	%	±%
Conservative		1,187		
Conservative		1,116		
Independent		365		
Labour		365		
Labour		321		
Turnout		3,354		
