= 2019 Hinckley and Bosworth Borough Council election =

2019 UK local government election

← 2015	2 May 2019	2023 →

All 34 seats to Hinckley and Bosworth Borough Council 18 seats needed for a majority

	First party	Second party	Third party
Party	Liberal Democrats	Conservative	Labour
Last election	12 seats, 29.4%	21 seats, 37.6%	1 seat, 18.0%
Seats won	21	11	2
Seat change	▲9	▼10	▲1
Popular vote	28,691	22,212	8,834
Percentage	46.4%	35.9%	14.3%
Swing	▲17.0%	▼1.7%	▼3.7%
Council control before election
Conservative
Council control after election
Liberal Democrats

The 2019 Hinckley and Bosworth Borough Council election took place on 2 May 2019 to elect members of Hinckley and Bosworth Borough Council in England. This was on the same day as other local elections. The election resulted in the Liberal Democrats gaining control of the council from the Conservatives.

== Results summary ==
2019 Hinckley and Bosworth Borough Council election
Party	Candidates	Seats	Gains	Losses	Net gain/loss	Seats %	Votes %	Votes	+/−
Liberal Democrats	34	21	9	0	▲9	61.8	46.4	28,691	+17.0
Conservative	34	11	0	10	▼10	32.4	35.9	22,212	–1.7
Labour	33	2	1	0	▲1	5.9	14.3	8,834	–3.7
UKIP	5	0	0	0	Steady	0.0	1.9	1,185	–9.9
Independent	2	0	0	0	Steady	0.0	0.7	463	–2.2
Green	1	0	0	0	Steady	0.0	0.7	424	+0.5

== Ward results ==
=== Ambien ===
Ambien
Party	Candidate	Votes	%	±%
Conservative	Jonathan Collett	648	59.5	+6.7
Liberal Democrats	Wendy Moore	167	15.3	+0.2
UKIP	Irina Ratcliffe	153	14.0	−4.8
Labour	Rupert Herd	121	11.1	−2.2
Turnout		1,107	37.53	
Conservative hold		Swing		

=== Barlestone, Nailstone & Osbaston ===
Barlestone, Nailstone & Osbaston
Party	Candidate	Votes	%	±%
Liberal Democrats	Bill Crooks	887	80.3	+18.9
Conservative	Jenny Simmons	135	12.2	−7.5
Labour	Cory Cronogue	83	7.5	−1.5
Turnout		1,112	42.41	
Liberal Democrats hold		Swing		

=== Barwell ===
Barwell
Party	Candidate	Votes	%	±%
Conservative	Hazel Smith	704	39.4	
Conservative	Russell Roberts	647	36.2	
Conservative	Huw Williams	629	35.2	
Liberal Democrats	Michael Gould	611	34.2	
Liberal Democrats	Pete Stead-Davis	600	33.5	
Liberal Democrats	Patricia Gould	590	33.0	
Labour	Jim Buck	401	22.4	
Labour	Andre Wheeler	396	22.1	
Labour	Rick Middleton	345	19.3	
Turnout		1,849	27.75	
Conservative hold		Swing		
Conservative hold		Swing		
Conservative hold		Swing		

=== Burbage Sketchley & Stretton ===
Burbage Sketchley & Stretton
Party	Candidate	Votes	%	±%
Liberal Democrats	Danny Findlay	1,250	46.0	
Liberal Democrats	Barry Walker	1,248	45.9	
Liberal Democrats	Paul Williams	1,226	45.1	
Conservative	Amanda Wright	1,099	40.4	
Conservative	Mike Hall	1,078	39.7	
Conservative	David MacDonald	973	35.8	
Labour	Phil Naldrett	300	11.0	
Labour	Debbie Wilbur	294	10.8	
Labour	James Ross	276	10.2	
Turnout		2,763	37.13	
Liberal Democrats gain from Conservative		Swing		
Liberal Democrats gain from Conservative		Swing		
Liberal Democrats gain from Conservative		Swing		

=== Burbage St Catherine's & Lash Hill ===
Burbage St Catherine's & Lash Hill
Party	Candidate	Votes	%	±%
Liberal Democrats	Richard Flemming	697	46.1	
Liberal Democrats	Dawn Glenville	697	46.1	
Conservative	Nigel Nickerson	585	38.7	
Conservative	Roger Johnson	536	35.5	
UKIP	Neale Smith	198	13.1	
Labour	Christina Emmett	158	10.5	
Labour	Marie Mills	149	9.9	
Turnout		1,606	33.78	
Liberal Democrats gain from Conservative		Swing		
Liberal Democrats gain from Conservative		Swing		

=== Cadeby, Carlton & Market Bosworth with Shackerstone ===
Cadeby, Carlton & Market Bosworth with Shackerstone
Party	Candidate	Votes	%	±%
Conservative	Maureen Cook	728	65.3	+9.9
Liberal Democrats	David Taylor	233	20.9	+3.7
Labour	Rosie Yule	154	13.8	−0.1
Turnout		1,142	38.79	
Conservative hold		Swing		

=== Earl Shilton ===
Earl Shilton
Party	Candidate	Votes	%	±%
Conservative	Chris Ladkin	890	42.9	
Conservative	Claire Allen	868	41.9	
Conservative	Richard Allen	854	41.2	
Liberal Democrats	Vivienne Darker	730	35.2	
Liberal Democrats	Sue Mannion	722	34.8	
Liberal Democrats	Mathew Hulbert	679	32.7	
Labour	Anna Franklin	359	17.3	
Labour	Lorraine Daniels	335	16.2	
Labour	Justine Duplock	318	15.3	
Turnout		2,141	26.81	
Conservative hold		Swing		
Conservative hold		Swing		
Conservative hold		Swing		

=== Groby ===
Groby
Party	Candidate	Votes	%	±%
Liberal Democrats	Martin Cartwright	863	51.8	
Liberal Democrats	Ted Hollick	815	48.9	
Conservative	Jenny O'Shea	652	39.1	
Conservative	Atul Joban	505	30.3	
Labour	Katharine Griffiths	209	12.5	
Labour	Julia Taylor	163	9.8	
Turnout		1,715	31.72	
Liberal Democrats hold		Swing		
Liberal Democrats hold		Swing		

=== Hinckley Castle ===
Hinckley Castle
Party	Candidate	Votes	%	±%
Liberal Democrats	Stuart Bray	914	59.8	
Liberal Democrats	Linda Mullaney	856	56.0	
Conservative	Natasha Jolob	352	23.0	
Conservative	Peter Wallace	322	21.1	
Labour	Rosie Lythgoe-Cheetham	269	17.6	
Labour	James Medhurst	229	15.0	
Turnout		1,558	30.45	
Liberal Democrats hold		Swing		
Liberal Democrats hold		Swing		

=== Hinckley Clarendon ===
Hinckley Clarendon
Party	Candidate	Votes	%	±%
Liberal Democrats	David Bill	1,351	68.0	
Liberal Democrats	Ann Pendlebury	1,198	60.3	
Liberal Democrats	Keith Lynch	1,161	58.4	
Conservative	Dave Beck	409	20.6	
Conservative	Del Young	352	17.7	
Conservative	Malcolm Cook	284	14.3	
Labour	Chris Kealey	215	10.8	
Labour	Lauren Gamble	168	8.5	
Labour	Marian Naldrett	163	8.2	
Independent	Benn Moore	129	6.5	
Turnout		2,021	28.82	
Liberal Democrats hold		Swing		
Liberal Democrats hold		Swing		
Liberal Democrats hold		Swing		

=== Hinckley De Montfort ===
Hinckley De Montfort
Party	Candidate	Votes	%	±%
Liberal Democrats	Michael Mullaney	1,802	59.5	
Liberal Democrats	Keith Nichols	1,627	53.7	
Liberal Democrats	Scott Gibbens	1,529	50.5	
Conservative	Jan Kirby	862	28.5	
Conservative	Connor Daldry	752	24.8	
Conservative	Khalid Ansari	638	21.1	
UKIP	Brian Reid	431	14.2	
Labour	Tony Wallis	232	7.7	
Labour	Valerie Mitchell	229	7.6	
Labour	Heather White	187	6.2	
Turnout		3,037	37.14	
Liberal Democrats gain from Conservative		Swing		
Liberal Democrats hold		Swing		
Liberal Democrats hold		Swing		

=== Hinckley Trinity ===
Hinckley Trinity
Party	Candidate	Votes	%	±%
Liberal Democrats	David Cope	835	59.4	
Liberal Democrats	Lynda Hodgkins	774	55.1	
UKIP	Chris Simpson	256	18.2	
Conservative	Andrew Baines	249	17.7	
Conservative	Michelle Nash	231	16.4	
Labour	Jemima Sampson	128	9.1	
Labour	Kathy Leese	123	8.8	
Turnout		1,412	25.63	
Liberal Democrats hold		Swing		
Liberal Democrats hold		Swing		

=== Markfield, Stanton & Field Head ===
Markfield, Stanton & Field Head
Party	Candidate	Votes	%	±%
Labour	Matthew Lay	1,097	60.2	
Labour	Andy Furlong	720	39.5	
Conservative	Peter Bedford	652	35.8	
Conservative	William Surtees	427	23.4	
Independent	David Sprason	334	18.3	N/A
Liberal Democrats	David Mullaney	93	5.1	
Liberal Democrats	Dale Smith	63	3.5	
Turnout		1,833	38.48	
Labour hold		Swing		
Labour gain from Conservative		Swing		

=== Newbold Verdon with Desford & Peckleton ===
Newbold Verdon with Desford & Peckleton
Party	Candidate	Votes	%	±%
Liberal Democrats	Joyce Crooks	1,423	54.9	
Liberal Democrats	Mark Sheppard-Bools	1,289	49.7	
Liberal Democrats	Robin Webber-Jones	1,116	43.1	
Conservative	Ruth Camamile	879	33.9	
Conservative	Miriam Surtees	759	29.3	
Conservative	Brian Sutton	706	27.2	
Green	Mick Gregg	424	16.4	N/A
Labour	Terry Gallagher	237	9.1	
Labour	Sarah Hall	187	7.2	
Labour	Tony Simhani	174	6.7	
Turnout		2,636	40.12	
Liberal Democrats gain from Conservative		Swing		
Liberal Democrats gain from Conservative		Swing		
Liberal Democrats gain from Conservative		Swing		

=== Ratby, Bagworth & Thornton ===
Ratby, Bagworth & Thornton
Party	Candidate	Votes	%	±%
Conservative	Ozzy O'Shea	1,196	72.7	
Conservative	Christopher Boothby	1,002	60.9	
Labour	Steven Malcherczyk	326	19.8	
Liberal Democrats	Rosanne Webber-Jones	280	17.0	
Liberal Democrats	Noel Robinson	169	10.3	
Turnout		1,686	32.37	
Conservative hold		Swing		
Conservative hold		Swing		

=== Twycross & Witherley with Sheepy ===
Twycross & Witherley with Sheepy
Party	Candidate	Votes	%	±%
Conservative	Kevin Morrell	609	58.5	−0.5
Liberal Democrats	Roger Laine	196	18.8	+6.9
UKIP	Alan Wood	147	14.1	+0.1
Labour	Hannah Moreton	89	8.5	−6.6
Turnout		1,044	40.12	
Conservative hold		Swing		
