= 2023 Hinckley and Bosworth Borough Council election =

2023 UK local government election

← 2019	4 May 2023	2027 →

All 34 seats to Hinckley and Bosworth Borough Council 18 seats needed for a majority

	First party	Second party
Leader	Stuart Bray	Richard Allen
Party	Liberal Democrats	Conservative
Seats before	21	9
Seats won	22	10
Seat change	▲1	▼1
Popular vote	28,195	21,617
Percentage	48.0%	36.8%
Swing	▲1.6%	▲0.9%
	Third party	Fourth party
Leader	Matthew Lay
Party	Labour	Independent
Seats before	2	2
Seats won	2	0
Seat change	Steady	Steady
Popular vote	5,940	1,059
Percentage	10.1%	1.8%
Swing	▼4.2%	▲1.1%
- Winner of each seat at the 2023 Hinckley and Bosworth Borough Council election
Leader before election
Stuart Bray
Liberal Democrats
Leader after election
Stuart Bray
Liberal Democrats

The 2023 Hinckley and Bosworth Borough Council election was held on 4 May 2023, to elect members of Hinckley and Bosworth Borough Council in Leicestershire, England. This was on the same day as other local elections across England. All sixteen wards were for election, each with between one and three councillors to be elected.

The Liberal Democrats retained control of the council.

== Summary ==
=== Election results ===
2023 Hinckley and Bosworth Borough Council election
Party	Candidates	Seats	Gains	Losses	Net gain/loss	Seats %	Votes %	Votes	+/−
Liberal Democrats	29	22	1	0	▲1	64.7	48.0	28,195	+1.6
Conservative	34	10	1	2	▼1	29.4	36.8	21,617	+0.9
Labour	15	2	1	1	Steady	5.9	10.1	5,940	–4.2
Green	4	0	0	0	Steady	0.0	1.8	1,076	+1.1
Independent	4	0	0	0	Steady	0.0	1.8	1,059	+1.1
Reform UK	4	0	0	0	Steady	0.0	1.2	680	N/A
UKIP	1	0	0	0	Steady	0.0	0.2	144	–1.7

== Ward results ==
Hinckley and Bosworth Borough Council election results.

Sitting councillors are marked with an asterisk (*).

=== Ambien ===
Ambien (1 seat)
Party	Candidate	Votes	%	±%
Conservative	Miriam Surtees	631	66.4	+6.9
Liberal Democrats	Genesta Cope	320	33.6	+18.3
Majority		311	32.8	−11.4
Turnout		951	32.6	−4.9
Conservative hold		Swing	-5.7	

=== Barlestone, Nailstone & Osbaston ===
Barlestone, Nailstone & Osbaston (1 seat)
Party	Candidate	Votes	%	±%
Liberal Democrats	Bill Crooks*	783	84.0	+3.7
Conservative	Madaleine Lee	149	16.0	+3.8
Majority		634	68.0	−0.1
Turnout		932	35.6	−6.8
Liberal Democrats hold		Swing	0.0	

=== Barwell ===
Barwell (3 seats)
Party	Candidate	Votes	%	±%
Conservative	Michael Simmons	606	36.7	+0.5
Labour Co-op	Charlotte Green	597	36.1	+14.0
Conservative	Hazel Smith*	593	35.9	−3.5
Labour Co-op	Jim Buck	537	32.5	+10.1
Labour Co-op	Robert Parkinson	532	32.2	+12.9
Conservative	Connor Daldry	513	31.1	−4.1
Independent	Michelle Nash	375	22.7	N/A
Independent	Russ Roberts*	308	18.6	−17.6
Green	Cassie Wells	263	15.9	N/A
Turnout		1,652	23.7	−4.1
Conservative hold				
Labour Co-op gain from Conservative				
Conservative hold				

=== Burbage Sketchley and Stretton ===
Burbage Sketchley and Stretton (3 seats)
Party	Candidate	Votes	%	±%
Liberal Democrats	Barry Walker*	1,534	59.2	+13.3
Liberal Democrats	Richard Flemming	1,530	59.1	+13.1
Liberal Democrats	Paul Williams*	1,496	57.8	+12.7
Conservative	Shirley Iliffe	885	34.2	−6.2
Conservative	Mary Sherwin	862	33.3	−6.4
Conservative	Peter Wallace	801	30.9	−4.9
UKIP	William Robinson	144	5.6	N/A
Turnout		2,590	32.4	−4.7
Liberal Democrats hold				
Liberal Democrats hold				
Liberal Democrats hold				

- Richard Flemming was a member for Burbage St Catherines and Lash Hill from 2019 to 2023

=== Burbage St Catherines and Lash Hill ===
Burbage St Catherines and Lash Hill (2 seats)
Party	Candidate	Votes	%	±%
Liberal Democrats	Dawn Glenville*	847	56.9	+10.8
Liberal Democrats	Pete Stead-Davis	779	52.4	+6.3
Conservative	Mark Thomas	621	41.7	+6.2
Conservative	Nick Nickerson	609	40.9	+2.2
Turnout		1,488	32.6	−1.2
Liberal Democrats hold				
Liberal Democrats hold				

=== Cadeby, Carlton and Market Bosworth with Shackerstone ===
Cadeby, Carlton and Market Bosworth with Shackerstone (1 seat)
Party	Candidate	Votes	%	±%
Conservative	Maureen Cook*	610	50.2	−15.1
Liberal Democrats	Andrew Tessier	480	39.5	+18.6
Labour	Geoff Dams	125	10.3	−3.5
Majority		130	10.7	−33.7
Turnout		1,215	41.1	+2.3
Conservative hold		Swing	-16.8	

=== Earl Shilton ===
Earl Shilton (3 seats)
Party	Candidate	Votes	%	±%
Liberal Democrats	Anna Weightman	789	36.4	+1.2
Conservative	Richard Allen*	785	36.2	−5.0
Conservative	Claire Allen*	783	36.1	−5.8
Liberal Democrats	Ben Paczek	781	36.0	+1.2
Conservative	Chris Ladkin*	763	35.2	−7.7
Liberal Democrats	Patrick Weightman	688	31.7	−1.0
Labour	Ivan Faver	358	16.5	−0.8
Labour	Carole Sharma	351	16.2	±0.0
Labour	Andre Wheeler	324	14.9	−0.4
Green	Rhiannon Carter	249	11.5	N/A
Reform UK	Peter Chesire	173	8.0	N/A
Turnout		2,169	26.6	−0.2
Liberal Democrats gain from Conservative				
Conservative hold				
Conservative hold				

=== Groby ===
Groby (2 seats)
Party	Candidate	Votes	%	±%
Liberal Democrats	Martin Cartwright*	947	56.0	+4.2
Liberal Democrats	Ted Hollick*	876	51.8	+2.9
Conservative	Gary Richardson	617	36.5	−2.6
Conservative	David Hyde	524	31.0	+0.7
Independent	John Hagan	161	9.5	N/A
Reform UK	Kim Robinson	93	5.5	N/A
Turnout		1,692	31.8	+0.1
Liberal Democrats hold				
Liberal Democrats hold				

=== Hinckley Castle ===
Hinckley Castle (2 seats)
Party	Candidate	Votes	%	±%
Liberal Democrats	Stuart Bray*	861	61.5	+1.7
Liberal Democrats	Linda Mullaney*	812	58.0	+2.0
Conservative	John Brown	329	23.5	+0.5
Conservative	Martin Leman	279	19.9	−1.2
Labour	James Ross	223	15.9	−1.7
Labour	Guy Macgregor-Devlin	219	15.7	+0.7
Turnout		1,399	27.7	−2.8
Liberal Democrats hold				
Liberal Democrats hold				

=== Hinckley Clarendon ===
Hinckley Clarendon (3 seats)
Party	Candidate	Votes	%	±%
Liberal Democrats	Cathie Gibbens	1,146	62.6	−5.4
Liberal Democrats	Ann Pendlebury*	1,120	61.1	+0.8
Liberal Democrats	Keith Lynch*	1,076	58.7	+0.3
Conservative	Lee Howard	341	18.6	−2.0
Conservative	Victoria Stapleton	330	18.0	+3.7
Labour	Paul Baddeley	324	17.7	+6.9
Conservative	Del Young	309	16.9	−0.8
Independent	Benn Moore	215	11.7	+5.2
Turnout		1,832	28.8	−3.2
Liberal Democrats hold				
Liberal Democrats hold				
Liberal Democrats hold				

- David Bill (Liberal Democrats) retired at this election after representing the ward for 50 years since 1973

=== Hinckley De Montfort ===
Hinckley De Montfort (3 seats)
Party	Candidate	Votes	%	±%
Liberal Democrats	Michael Mullaney*	1,597	58.6	−0.9
Liberal Democrats	Lynda Hodgkins	1,478	54.2	+0.5
Liberal Democrats	Scott Gibbens*	1,429	52.4	+1.9
Conservative	Jan Kirby	839	30.8	+2.3
Conservative	Jonny Bray	730	26.8	+2.0
Conservative	Derek Roulston	703	25.8	+4.7
Labour	James Davis	309	11.3	+3.6
Reform UK	Andy Egginton	213	7.8	N/A
Reform UK	Keith Silcock	201	7.4	N/A
Turnout		2,725	33.1	−4.0
Liberal Democrats hold				
Liberal Democrats hold				
Liberal Democrats hold				

- Lynda Hodgkins was a member for Hinckley Trinity from 2019 to 2023

=== Hinckley Trinity ===
Hinckley Trinity (2 seats)
Party	Candidate	Votes	%	±%
Liberal Democrats	David Cope*	874	69.4	+10.0
Liberal Democrats	James Moore	734	58.3	+3.2
Conservative	Amanda Hills	282	22.4	+4.7
Conservative	Ronald Walker	241	19.1	+2.7
Labour	Rosie Lythgoe-Cheetham	192	15.3	+6.2
Turnout		1,259	23.3	−2.3
Liberal Democrats hold				
Liberal Democrats hold				

=== Markfield, Stanton and Fieldhead ===
Markfield, Stanton and Fieldhead (2 seats)
Party	Candidate	Votes	%	±%
Labour Co-op	Christopher Lambert	797	47.8	−12.4
Conservative	Claire Harris	779	46.7	+10.9
Labour Co-op	Robert Martin	674	40.4	+0.9
Conservative	Leigh Quilter	674	40.4	+17.0
Green	Lisa Wren	195	11.7	N/A
Turnout		1,667	34.9	−3.6
Labour Co-op hold				
Conservative gain from Labour Co-op				

=== Newbold Verdon with Desford and Peckleton ===
Newbold Verdon with Desford and Peckleton (3 seats)
Party	Candidate	Votes	%	±%
Liberal Democrats	Joyce Crooks*	1,593	61.0	+6.1
Liberal Democrats	Mark Bools*	1,525	58.4	+8.7
Liberal Democrats	Robin Webber-Jones*	1,415	54.2	+11.1
Conservative	Peter Bedford	1,034	39.6	+5.7
Conservative	Ross Hills	913	35.0	+5.7
Conservative	James Paterson	831	31.8	+4.6
Turnout		2,610	37.0	−3.1
Liberal Democrats hold				
Liberal Democrats hold				
Liberal Democrats hold				

=== Ratby, Bagworth & Thornton ===
Ratby, Bagworth & Thornton (2 seats)
Party	Candidate	Votes	%	±%
Conservative	Ozzy O'Shea*	1,062	64.1	−8.6
Conservative	Christopher Boothby*	950	57.4	−3.5
Labour	Ashley Martin	378	22.8	+3.0
Green	Mark Wren	369	22.3	N/A
Liberal Democrats	David Mullaney	163	9.8	−7.2
Liberal Democrats	Noel Robinson	126	7.6	−2.7
Turnout		1,656	29.4	−3.0
Conservative hold				
Conservative hold				

=== Twycross and Witherley with Sheepy ===
Twycross and Witherley with Sheepy (1 seat)
Party	Candidate	Votes	%	±%
Conservative	Brian Sutton	639	61.7	+3.2
Liberal Democrats	Robert Mayne	396	38.3	+19.5
Majority		243	23.4	−16.3
Turnout		1,035	40.7	+0.6
Conservative hold		Swing	-8.1	

== Changes 2023–2027 ==
- Chris Boothby, elected as a Conservative, left the party to sit as an independent in May 2024.
- Charlotte Green, elected for Labour, joined the Liberal Democrats in May 2024.
