= 1995 Hinckley and Bosworth Borough Council election =

1995 UK local government election

Elections to Hinckley and Bosworth Council were held on 4 May 1995. The whole council was up for election. The Conservative Party lost overall control of the council. The overall turnout was 43.6%.

== Election result ==
Hinckley & Bosworth local election result 1995
| Party | Seats | Gains | Losses | Net gain/loss | Seats % | Votes % | Votes | +/− |
|---|---|---|---|---|---|---|---|---|
| Liberal Democrats | 16 | 7 | 0 | +7 | 47.1 | | | |
| Labour | 13 | 8 | 0 | +8 | 38.2 | | 26,069 | |
| Conservative | 5 | 0 | 15 | -15 | 14.7 | | 19,820 | |
| Independent | 0 | 0 | 0 | 0 | 0 | | 130 | |

== Ward results ==
Ambien
| Party | Candidate | Votes | % | ±% |
|---|---|---|---|---|
| Labour | J French | 400 | 39.6 | |
| Conservative | P Wills | 354 | 35.0 | |
| Liberal Democrats | K Stephenson | 256 | 25.3 | |
| Majority | | 46 | 4.6 | |
| Turnout | | 1,010 | | |
| Labour gain from Conservative | | Swing | | |

Bagworth
| Party | Candidate | Votes | % | ±% |
|---|---|---|---|---|
| Labour | S Murphy | 481 | 64.2 | |
| Conservative | N McCausland | 226 | 30.2 | |
| Liberal Democrats | J Payne | 42 | 5.6 | |
| Majority | | 255 | 34.0 | |
| Turnout | | 749 | | |
| Labour gain from Conservative | | Swing | | |

Barlestone, Nailstone and Osbaston
| Party | Candidate | Votes | % | ±% |
|---|---|---|---|---|
| Liberal Democrats | W Crooks | 850 | 60.5 | |
| Labour | W Moore | 348 | 24.8 | |
| Conservative | J Crane | 208 | 14.8 | |
| Majority | | 502 | 35.7 | |
| Turnout | | 1,406 | | |
| Liberal Democrats hold | | Swing | | |

Barwell (3)
| Party | Candidate | Votes | % | ±% |
|---|---|---|---|---|
| Labour | S Francks | 1,411 | | |
| Labour | P Page | 1,254 | | |
| Labour | A Wheeler | 1,230 | | |
| Conservative | J Russell | 684 | | |
| Conservative | R Aldridge | 636 | | |
| Conservative | D Astley | 585 | | |
| Liberal Democrats | A Cooper | 266 | | |
| Liberal Democrats | M Gould | 236 | | |
| Liberal Democrats | P Gould | 222 | | |
| Turnout | | 6,524 | | |
| Labour hold | | Swing | | |
| Labour gain from Conservative | | Swing | | |
| Labour gain from Conservative | | Swing | | |

Burbage (3)
| Party | Candidate | Votes | % | ±% |
|---|---|---|---|---|
| Liberal Democrats | A Crabtree | 1,361 | | |
| Conservative | E Atkin | 1,288 | | |
| Liberal Democrats | P Hall | 1,249 | | |
| Conservative | M Bevins | 1,239 | | |
| Liberal Democrats | A Stevens | 1,122 | | |
| Conservative | A Noon | 1,116 | | |
| Labour | A MacQueen | 855 | | |
| Labour | P Kavanagh | 799 | | |
| Labour | I Wilcock | 765 | | |
| Turnout | | 9,794 | | |
| Liberal Democrats gain from Conservative | | Swing | | |
| Conservative hold | | Swing | | |
| Liberal Democrats gain from Conservative | | Swing | | |

Cadeby, Carlton and Market Bosworth
| Party | Candidate | Votes | % | ±% |
|---|---|---|---|---|
| Liberal Democrats | A Goodwin | 429 | 42.8 | |
| Labour | R Collett | 293 | 29.2 | |
| Conservative | P Cutress | 280 | 28.0 | |
| Majority | | 136 | 13.6 | |
| Turnout | | 1,002 | | |
| Liberal Democrats gain from Conservative | | Swing | | |

Castle (3)
| Party | Candidate | Votes | % | ±% |
|---|---|---|---|---|
| Liberal Democrats | V Bill | 1,175 | | |
| Liberal Democrats | G Cope | 1,011 | | |
| Liberal Democrats | D Wood | 878 | | |
| Labour | E Gabriel | 683 | | |
| Labour | N Payne | 680 | | |
| Labour | G Whyman | 634 | | |
| Conservative | C Claridge | 499 | | |
| Conservative | B Snow | 491 | | |
| Conservative | G Rainford | 489 | | |
| Independent | C Parr | 130 | | |
| Turnout | | 6,670 | | |
| Liberal Democrats hold | | Swing | | |
| Liberal Democrats hold | | Swing | | |

Clarendon (3)
| Party | Candidate | Votes | % | ±% |
|---|---|---|---|---|
| Liberal Democrats | D Bill | 1,390 | | |
| Liberal Democrats | K Lynch | 1,121 | | |
| Liberal Democrats | G Payne | 1,081 | | |
| Labour | R Banks | 749 | | |
| Labour | M Mills | 667 | | |
| Labour | S Drodge | 661 | | |
| Conservative | T Beck | 375 | | |
| Conservative | K Brown | 373 | | |
| Conservative | W Wonders | 319 | | |
| Turnout | | 6,736 | | |
| Liberal Democrats hold | | Swing | | |
| Liberal Democrats hold | | Swing | | |

De Montfort (3)
| Party | Candidate | Votes | % | ±% |
|---|---|---|---|---|
| Liberal Democrats | J White | 1,202 | | |
| Liberal Democrats | W Moore | 1,025 | | |
| Liberal Democrats | D Wright | 1,006 | | |
| Conservative | G Johnson | 929 | | |
| Conservative | P Wallace | 892 | | |
| Conservative | C Oliver | 836 | | |
| Labour | V Mitchell | 666 | | |
| Labour | C Mitchell | 666 | | |
| Labour | G Francks | 646 | | |
| Turnout | | 7,867 | | |
| Liberal Democrats gain from Conservative | | Swing | | |
| Liberal Democrats gain from Conservative | | Swing | | |
| Liberal Democrats gain from Conservative | | Swing | | |

Desford and Peckleton (2)
| Party | Candidate | Votes | % | ±% |
|---|---|---|---|---|
| Liberal Democrats | R Cole | 689 | | |
| Conservative | A Wainwright | 641 | | |
| Conservative | R Camamile | 619 | | |
| Liberal Democrats | R Dabell | 606 | | |
| Labour | T Murray | 511 | | |
| Labour | A Furlong | 447 | | |
| Turnout | | 3,513 | | |
| Liberal Democrats gain from Conservative | | Swing | | |
| Conservative hold | | Swing | | |

Earl Shilton (3)
| Party | Candidate | Votes | % | ±% |
|---|---|---|---|---|
| Labour | D Bown | 1,758 | | |
| Labour | J Bown | 1,566 | | |
| Labour | R Ellis | 1,561 | | |
| Conservative | P Priestnall | 610 | | |
| Conservative | G Redshaw | 581 | | |
| Conservative | J Martin | 513 | | |
| Liberal Democrats | C Tompkins | 492 | | |
| Liberal Democrats | D Inman | 418 | | |
| Liberal Democrats | G Pratt | 352 | | |
| Turnout | | 7,851 | | |
| Labour hold | | Swing | | |
| Labour hold | | Swing | | |

Groby (2)
| Party | Candidate | Votes | % | ±% |
|---|---|---|---|---|
| Labour | A Howlett | 903 | | |
| Conservative | C Dobbin | 806 | | |
| Conservative | M Halliday | 750 | | |
| Labour | F Mukaddam | 734 | | |
| Liberal Democrats | M Lynch | 432 | | |
| Liberal Democrats | E Garbutt | 407 | | |
| Turnout | | 4,032 | | |
| Labour gain from Conservative | | Swing | | |
| Conservative hold | | Swing | | |

Markfield (2)
| Party | Candidate | Votes | % | ±% |
|---|---|---|---|---|
| Labour | L Neville | 913 | | |
| Labour | M Lay | 902 | | |
| Conservative | M Browning | 832 | | |
| Conservative | D Crane | 710 | | |
| Liberal Democrats | E Scrine | 202 | | |
| Liberal Democrats | J Finney | 104 | | |
| Turnout | | 3,663 | | |
| Labour gain from Conservative | | Swing | | |
| Labour gain from Conservative | | Swing | | |

Newbold Verdon
| Party | Candidate | Votes | % | ±% |
|---|---|---|---|---|
| Liberal Democrats | J Crooks | 755 | 64.5 | |
| Labour | D MacPhail | 269 | 23.0 | |
| Conservative | D Brooks | 146 | 12.5 | |
| Majority | | 486 | 41.5 | |
| Turnout | | 1,170 | | |
| Liberal Democrats hold | | Swing | | |

Ratby
| Party | Candidate | Votes | % | ±% |
|---|---|---|---|---|
| Labour | R Bennett | 735 | 57.8 | |
| Conservative | R Fraser | 445 | 35.0 | |
| Liberal Democrats | A Cruickshank | 91 | 7.2 | |
| Majority | | 290 | 22.8 | |
| Turnout | | 1,271 | | |
| Labour gain from Conservative | | Swing | | |

Sheepy and Witherley
| Party | Candidate | Votes | % | ±% |
|---|---|---|---|---|
| Conservative | R Furniss | 631 | 58.2 | |
| Labour | J Schwiening | 272 | 25.1 | |
| Liberal Democrats | M Shaw | 181 | 16.7 | |
| Majority | | 359 | 33.1 | |
| Turnout | | 580 | | |
| Conservative hold | | Swing | | |

Trinity (2)
| Party | Candidate | Votes | % | ±% |
|---|---|---|---|---|
| Labour | D Everitt | 820 | | |
| Liberal Democrats | D Cope | 704 | | |
| Liberal Democrats | P Scola | 693 | | |
| Labour | R Scarth | 655 | | |
| Conservative | M Gladman | 198 | | |
| Conservative | R Shooter | 163 | | |
| Turnout | | 3,233 | | |
| Labour gain from Conservative | | Swing | | |
| Liberal Democrats hold | | Swing | | |

Twycross and Shackerstone
| Party | Candidate | Votes | % | ±% |
|---|---|---|---|---|
| Conservative | B Sutton | 343 | 59.1 | |
| Labour | I Granger | 149 | 25.7 | |
| Liberal Democrats | M Richardson | 88 | 15.2 | |
| Majority | | 194 | 33.4 | |
| Turnout | | 580 | | |
| Conservative hold | | Swing | | |
