= 2015 Hinckley and Bosworth Borough Council election =

2015 UK local government election

Results by ward

The 2015 Hinckley and Bosworth Borough Council election took place on 7 May 2015 to elect members of the Hinckley and Bosworth Borough Council in England. It was held on the same day as other local elections.

The Conservatives won 21 of 34 councillors, with the Liberal Democrats winning 12 and Labour winning one. The Conservatives thus replaced the Liberal Democrats as the largest party on the council.

== Results summary ==
2015 Hinckley and Bosworth Borough Council election
Party	Candidates	Seats	Gains	Losses	Net gain/loss	Seats %	Votes %	Votes	+/−
Conservative	32	21	7	1	▲6	61.8	34.5	20,301	–9.7
Liberal Democrats	34	12	1	7	▼6	35.3	27.1	15,943	–5.1
Labour	34	1	0	0	Steady	2.9	16.9	9,950	–5.1
UKIP	19	0	0	0	Steady	0.0	17.5	10,298	+17.5
Independent	6	0	0	0	Steady	0.0	3.6	2,133	+2.0
Green	1	0	0	0	Steady	0.0	0.4	243	+0.4

== Results by ward ==
=== Ambien ===
Ambien
Party	Candidate	Votes	%
Conservative	Reg Ward	1,110	52.8
UKIP	Tracey Clarke	394	18.8
Liberal Democrats	Cathy Phayres	317	15.1
Labour	Rupert Herd	280	13.3
Majority		716	34.1
Turnout		2101	75.5
Conservative hold			

=== Barlestone, Nailstone and Osbaston ===
Barlestone, Nailstone and Osbaston
Party	Candidate	Votes	%
Liberal Democrats	Bill Crooks	1,125	61.4
Conservative	Alan Greenwood	360	19.7
UKIP	Geoff Woodcroft	181	9.9
Labour	Patrick Casswell	165	9.0
Majority		765	41.8
Turnout		1831	70.7
Conservative hold			

=== Barwell ===
Barwell
Party	Candidate	Votes	%
Conservative	Hazel Smith	1,329	
Conservative	Russell Roberts	1,271	
Conservative	Huw Williams	1,201	
UKIP	Gordon Davies	960	
UKIP	Bob Rattigan	898	
UKIP	Terry Wilson	873	
Labour	Sandra Francks	861	
Liberal Democrats	Michael Gould	744	
Liberal Democrats	Charlotte Green	738	
Labour	Andre Wheeler	695	
Labour	Barry Granger	694	
Liberal Democrats	Mathew Hulbert	640	
Turnout			59.45
Conservative hold			
Conservative gain from Liberal Democrats			
Conservative gain from Liberal Democrats			

=== Burbage Sketchley & Stretton ===
Burbage Sketchley & Stretton
Party	Candidate	Votes	%
Conservative	Mike Hall	2,313	
Conservative	Amanda Wright	2,176	
Conservative	Stan Rooney	1,998	
Liberal Democrats	Rob Mayne	1,537	
Liberal Democrats	Richard Flemming	1,439	
Liberal Democrats	John Moore	1,436	
UKIP	Alan Wood	753	
Labour	Mark Jackson	701	
Labour	Marian Naldrett	666	
Labour	Jemima Sampson	614	
Turnout			72
Conservative hold			
Conservative gain from Liberal Democrats			
Conservative gain from Liberal Democrats			

=== Burbage St Catherines & Lash Hill ===
Burbage St Catherines & Lash Hill
Party	Candidate	Votes	%
Conservative	Peter Wallace	1,094	
Conservative	Mark Nickerson	1,069	
Liberal Democrats	Ann Hall	1,022	
Liberal Democrats	Howard Wilkins	775	
UKIP	Neale Smith	593	
Labour	Marie Mills	455	
Labour	Gwenfron Granger	361	
Turnout			66.67
Conservative gain from Liberal Democrats			
Conservative gain from Liberal Democrats			

=== Cadeby Carlton & Market Bosworth with Shackerstone ===
Cadeby Carlton & Market Bosworth with Shackerstone
Party	Candidate	Votes	%
Conservative	Maureen Cook	1,243	55.4
Liberal Democrats	Jeremy White	386	17.2
Labour	Jean Fryett	313	13.9
UKIP	Elaine Simpson	303	13.5
Majority		957	42.6
Turnout		2245	76.7
Conservative hold			

=== Earl Shilton ===
Earl Shilton
Party	Candidate	Votes	%
Conservative	Janice Richards	1,973	
Conservative	Richard Allen	1,819	
Conservative	Chris Ladkin	1,740	
UKIP	Joe Hallam	1,166	
Labour	Christine Dallas	1,065	
Labour	Colin Ellis	1,041	
Labour	Lesley Panton	949	
UKIP	Michael Sammons	926	
Liberal Democrats	Steven Baker	843	
Liberal Democrats	Pam Wills	696	
Liberal Democrats	Patricia Gould	629	
Turnout			61.8
Conservative hold			
Conservative hold			
Conservative hold			

=== Groby ===
Groby
Party	Candidate	Votes	%
Liberal Democrats	Martin Cartwright	1,290	
Liberal Democrats	Ted Hollick	1,129	
Independent	Peter Batty	1,083	
Independent	Leigh Quilter	967	
UKIP	Paul Sharma	814	
Labour	Dianne Esmond	649	
Labour	John Henderson	482	
Independent	Robert Fraser	341	
Turnout			68
Liberal Democrats hold			
Liberal Democrats gain from Conservative			

=== Hinckley Castle ===
Hinckley Castle
Party	Candidate	Votes	%
Liberal Democrats	Stuart Bray	1,321	
Liberal Democrats	Bron Witherford	913	
Conservative	Ian Coe	674	
Conservative	Michelle Coe	597	
UKIP	Geoff Geary	533	
Labour	Eamonn Gabriel	524	
Labour	Steve Malcherczyk	296	
Green	Roger Hill	243	
Turnout			57.9
Liberal Democrats hold			
Liberal Democrats hold			

=== Hinckley Clarendon ===
Hinckley Clarendon
Party	Candidate	Votes	%
Liberal Democrats	David Bill	1,918	
Liberal Democrats	Keith Lynch	1,419	
Liberal Democrats	Diane Taylor	1,360	
Conservative	Christopher Ashton	1,129	
Conservative	Peter Morris	901	
Conservative	Mary Sherwin	900	
UKIP	Gary Cart	809	
UKIP	John Crowley	796	
Labour	John Kealey	630	
Labour	Sarah Furlong	531	
Labour	Rod Parker	478	
Independent	Benn Moore	190	
Turnout			62.3
Liberal Democrats hold			
Liberal Democrats hold			
Liberal Democrats hold			

=== Hinckley De Montfort ===
Hinckley De Montfort
Party	Candidate	Votes	%
Conservative	Jan Kirby	1,852	
Liberal Democrats	Lynda Hodgkins	1,825	
Liberal Democrats	Keith Nichols	1,796	
Conservative	Rosemary Wright	1,753	
Liberal Democrats	Ann Pendlebury	1,735	
Conservative	Alan Ottey	1,703	
UKIP	Ben Wyatt	1,033	
Labour	Josie Johnson	708	
Labour	Val Mitchell	667	
Labour	Charles Leggat	655	
Independent	Scott Gibbens	231	
Turnout			66.9
Conservative gain from Liberal Democrats			
Liberal Democrats hold			
Liberal Democrats hold			

=== Hinckley Trinity ===
Hinckley Trinity
Party	Candidate	Votes	%
Liberal Democrats	David Cope	1,475	
Liberal Democrats	Genesta Cope	1,196	
Conservative	David Beck	873	
UKIP	Christopher Simpson	671	
Conservative	Andrew Clayton	660	
Labour	Karen Coffey	433	
Labour	Laura McManus	417	
Turnout			59.94
Liberal Democrats hold			
Liberal Democrats hold			

=== Markfield, Stanton & Field Head ===
Markfield, Stanton & Field Head
Party	Candidate	Votes	%
Labour	Matthew Lay	1,461	
Conservative	Paul Bessant	1,050	
Conservative	David Surtees	995	
Labour	Andrew Furlong	782	
Independent	Sue Sprason	629	
Liberal Democrats	Michael Greenwood	308	
Liberal Democrats	Patricia Bannister	196	
Turnout			59.1
Labour hold			
Conservative hold			

=== Newbold Verdon with Desford & Peckleton ===
Newbold Verdon with Desford & Peckleton
Party	Candidate	Votes	%
Conservative	Ruth Camamile	2,054	
Conservative	Miriam Surtees	1,644	
Conservative	Brian Sutton	1,387	
Liberal Democrats	Joyce Crooks	1,314	
Liberal Democrats	Dianne Finney	1,211	
UKIP	David Sprason	1,064	
Liberal Democrats	John Finney	1,013	
Labour	Terry Gallagher	711	
Labour	Tricia Russell	657	
Labour	Tony Simhani	530	
Turnout			71
Conservative hold			
Conservative hold			
Conservative hold			

=== Ratby, Bagworth and Thornton ===
Ratby, Bagworth & Thornton
Party	Candidate	Votes	%
Conservative	Ozzy O'Shea	2,080	
Conservative	Christopher Boothby	1,942	
UKIP	David Rowe	747	
Labour	Derek Fryett	696	
Labour	Mark Proctor	615	
Liberal Democrats	Ann Crabtree	282	
Liberal Democrats	Dale Smith	203	
Turnout			67.6
Conservative hold			
Conservative hold			

=== Twycross & Witherley with Sheepy ===
Twycross & Witherley with Sheepy
Party	Candidate	Votes	%
Conservative	Kevin Morrell	1,167	59.0
Labour	Andrew Gilbrenny	298	15.1
UKIP	David Sperry	277	14.0
Liberal Democrats	Donald Wright	236	11.9
Majority		869	43.9
Turnout		1978	78.9
Conservative hold			
