= 1999 Hinckley and Bosworth Borough Council election =

1999 UK local government election

Elections to Hinckley and Bosworth Council were held on 6 May 1999. The whole council was up for election. The council stayed under no overall control.

== Election result ==
Hinckley & Bosworth local election result 1999
Party	Seats	Gains	Losses	Net gain/loss	Seats %	Votes %	Votes	+/−
Liberal Democrats	14			−2	41.2			
Conservative	11			+6	32.4			
Labour	9			−4	26.5			
