= Ashby Potters' Guild =

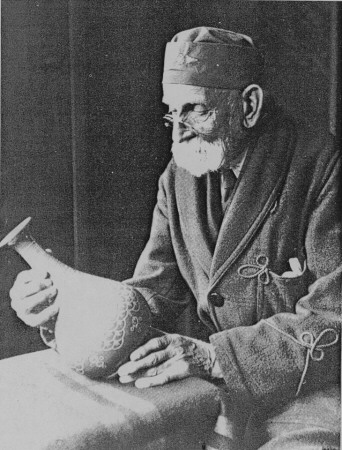
William Ault inspecting his company's work.

Ashby Potters' Guild was an English art pottery existing from 1909 to 1922.

The studio pottery was established in 1909 in Woodville, Derbyshire, by Pascoe Tunnicliffe (1881–1956). Tunnicliffe's father, Edwin Rowland Tunnicliffe, who lived in Woodlville, had taken over a ceramics factory known as Victoria Pottery in 1897 and produced a range of utilitarian household wares. Ashby Potters' Guild was an expansion of the business intended to produce more high-end art pottery. Pascoe Tunnicliff created experimental decorative glaze effects and worked with Thomas Camm, who was in charge of design.

Tunnicliffe exhibited at the International Exhibition Brussels 1910, the Turin International Exhibition 1911, the Ghent Exhibition 1913 and the British Industrial Arts Exhibition (1920).

Studio production was temporarily suspended during the first World War. In 1922 the pottery merged with the Ault Faience Pottery to form Ault and Tunnicliffe. The owner of Ault Faience Pottery, William Ault had retired and Pascoe Tunnicliffe became the works director. The merged company was later renamed Aultcliff and renamed again in 1937 as Ault Potteries Ltd.

== Examples in public collections ==
Ceramics by the Ashby Potter's Guild are in the collection of a number of museums including the Museum of New Zealand Te Papa Tongarewa, Derby Museum and Art Gallery, the Victoria and Albert Museum and locally Sharpe's Pottery Museum in Swadlincote.

== See also ==
- Bretby Art Pottery
