= Dorman Museum =

Museum in Middlesbrough, England

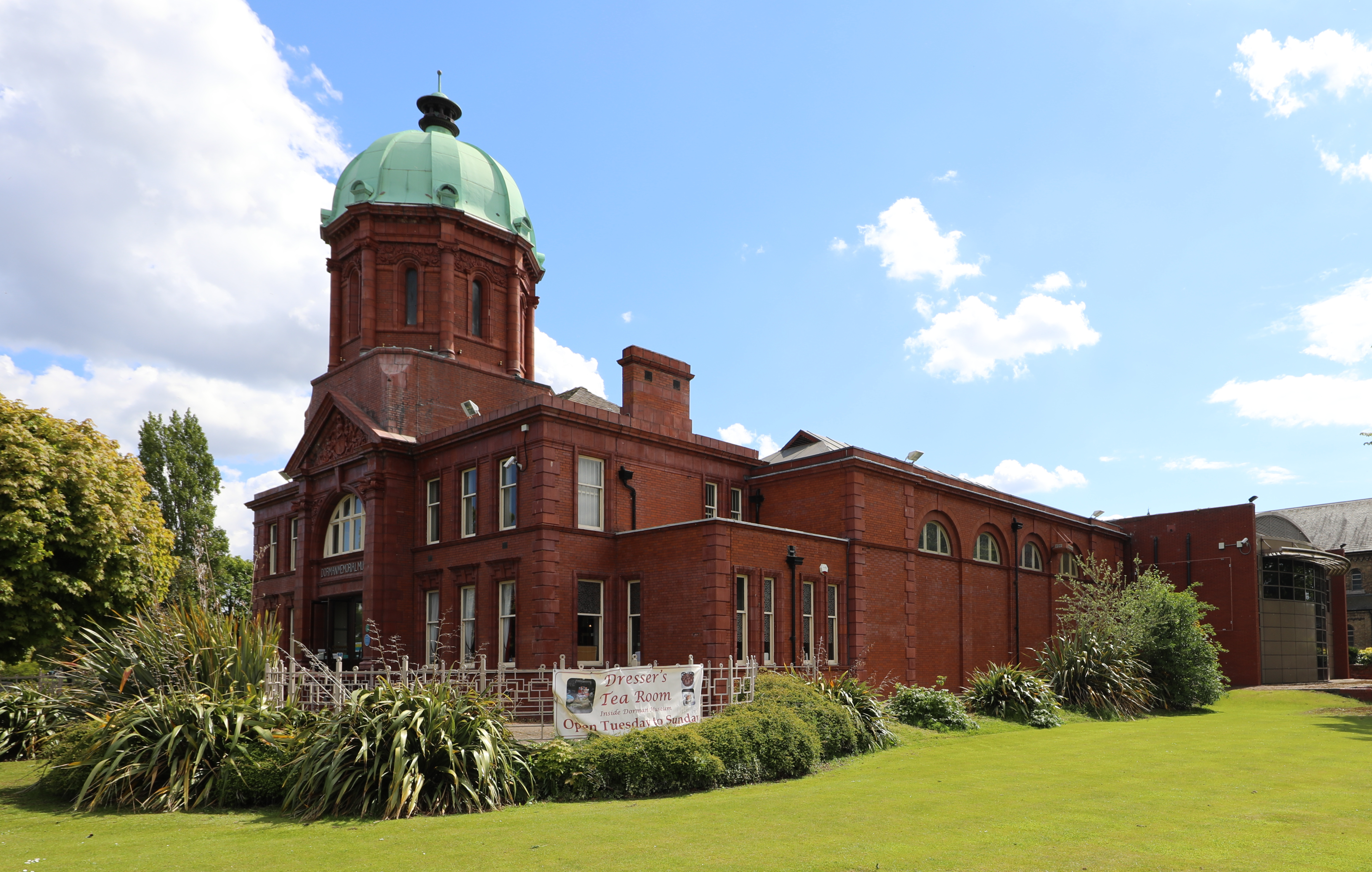
- Dorman Museum
- Established: 1 July 1904
- Location: Linthorpe Road, Middlesbrough
- Coordinates: 54.5644°N 1.2409°W
- Parking: Street parking adjacent to museum
- Website: middlesbroughmuseums.co.uk/dorman-museum/

Dorman Museum is a local and social history museum on the town centre side of Albert Park, Linthorpe in Middlesbrough, North Yorkshire, England. It is one of two museums operated by the local borough council, along with the Captain Cook birthplace in Stewart Park. As of May 2024 the museum remains closed for renovations.

The museum was founded by Sir Arthur Dorman of the Dorman Long engineering company in honour of his son George Lockwood Dorman, who died of enteric fever at Kroonstad in the Second Boer War.

At its official opening on 1 July 1904, the museum's theme was the natural sciences. Since then, galleries of the local Linthorpe Art Pottery, work by Victorian industrial designer Christopher Dresser, and Middlesbrough's history have eclipsed this early theme. Remnants of the original Victorian and Edwardian collection of taxidermied, plinth-mounted animals are in the Nelson Room; various taxidermied exotic birds in their original cases with decorative painted backgrounds and colourful and large birds' eggs.

== Visiting the museum ==
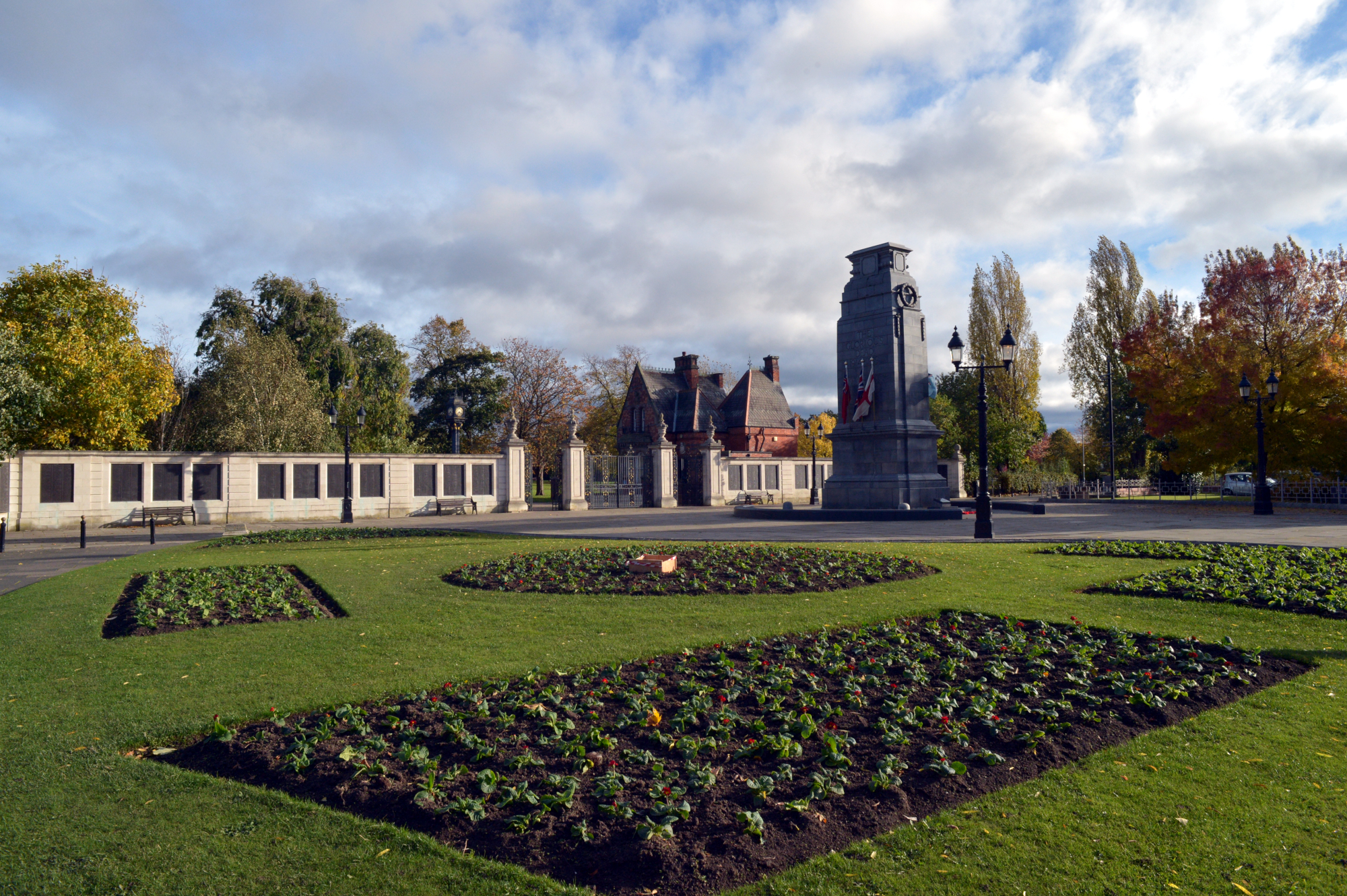
The war memorial in front of the museum entrance

The Dorman Museum has eight permanent display galleries and a changing temporary exhibition spaces on the ground floor. Small exhibitions also take place within the ground floor corridor. Access to the upper floor is by the main staircase or lift. The museum also has a Victorian style tearoom on the ground floor, named Dresser's Tea Room.

== Original collection ==
The original collection included items such as a stuffed and mounted eagle owl in the act of taking a hare; a stuffed lion in a "rampant" pose; and many birds' eggs, butterflies, and insects preserved under glass and in drawers, with covers over the glass to avoid the effects of light on the specimens. One particular specimen case contained a model, at least 100 times normal size, of a human head louse. At about the same time, the museum possessed a fossil of an ichthyosaur. There was also a stuffed ribbonfish, a few metres in length.

One of the first contributors to the museum was Henry Bolckow, founder of Middlesbrough's largest ironworks, Bolckow Vaughan, who paid for some stuffed birds in 1874.

== Christopher Dresser designs and Linthorpe Art Pottery wares ==
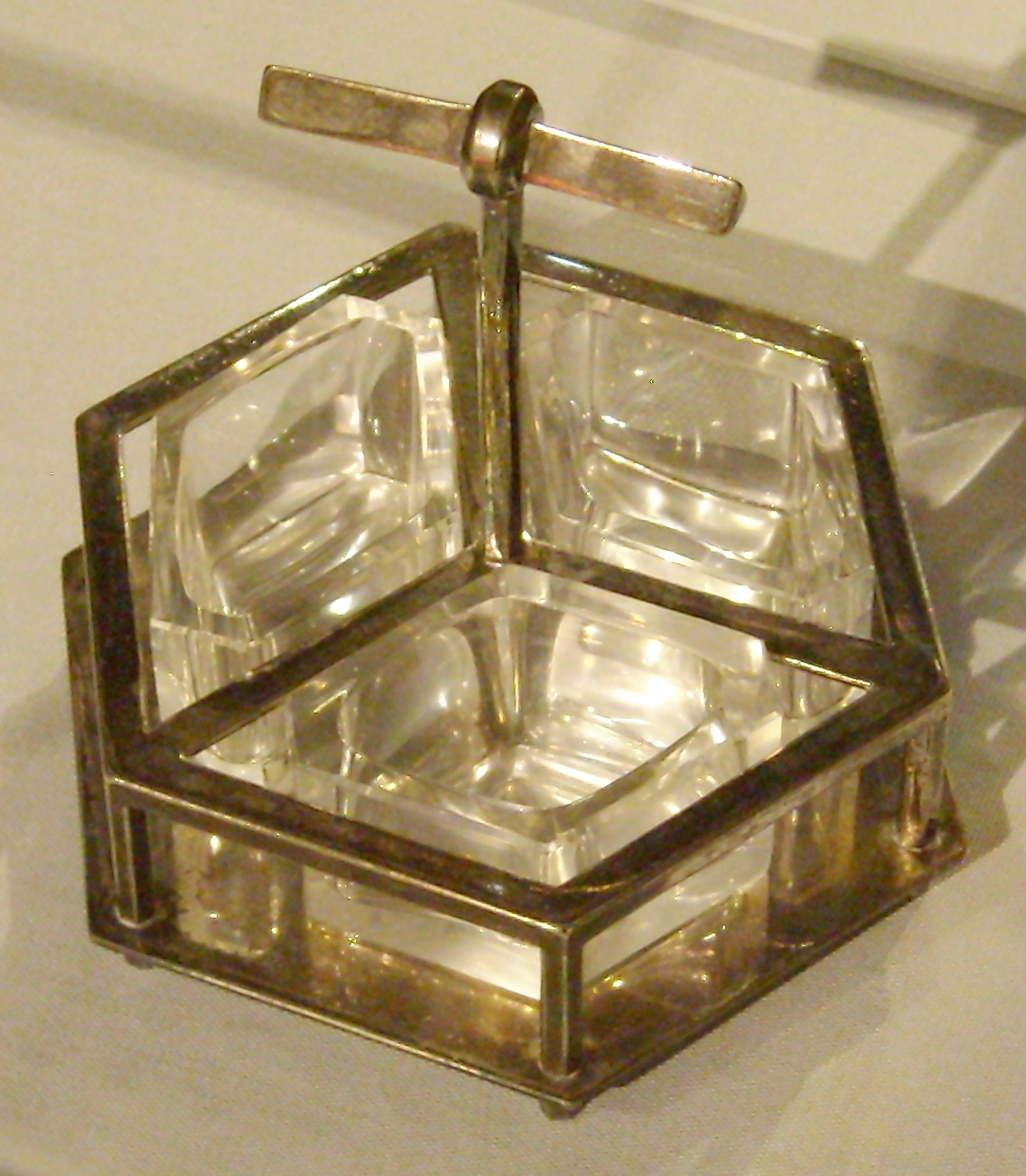
Dresser Cruet Set

Christopher Dresser was a pivotal figure in the Aesthetic Movement and deeply involved in the Linthorpe Art Pottery less than a mile from the museum which after the closure thus has the primary Dresser collection. This was backed by a Heritage Lottery Fund grant leading to the 2014-refurbished gallery. It showcases 160 works produced directly from his designs, as well as those produced by others influenced by his work, and the collection expands. The mostpart was bought from one collector – further helped by the Art Fund and the V&A's Purchase Grant Fund. The Linthorpe Art Pottery gallery covers the pottery's success, sources and lasting inspirations – by no means limited to ceramics.

The museum runs an education and activity programme covering these vibrant and dynamic collections.

== Other artefacts ==
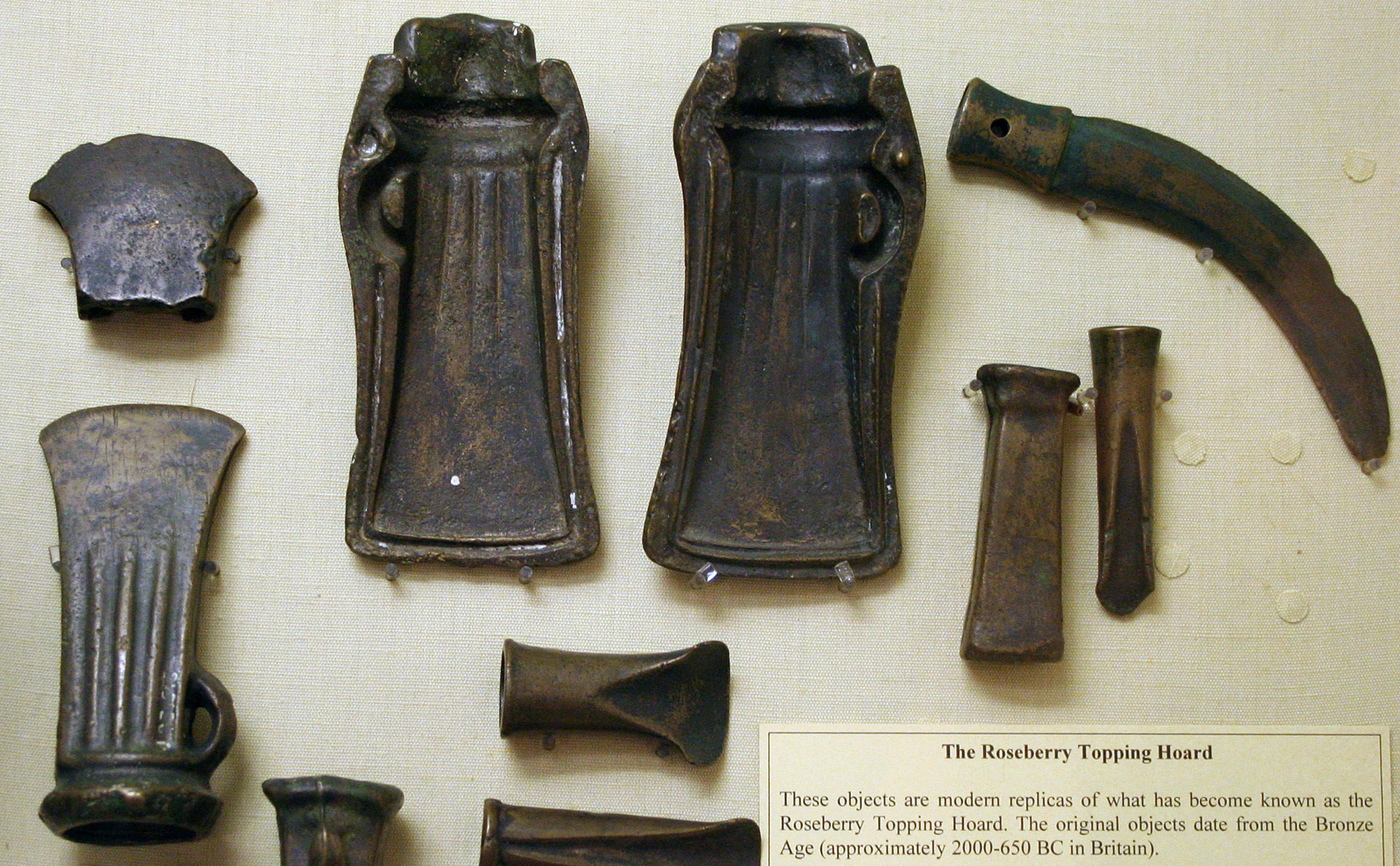
Roseberry Topping hoard

=== Elgee's excavations ===
The museum has a library of journals and photographs by Frank Elgee during his excavations. Principally at the Bronze Age hillfort at Eston Nab and burial grounds at Loose Howe, also, a dug-out canoe recovered from the Tees 8-foot (2.4 m)deep in 1926 is on view. A green plaque dedicated to Elgee – curator between 1923 and 1932 – graces the entrance.

=== Botanical collections ===
- Herbarium of Margaret Stovin assembled between 1798 and 1850. Comprises two major sections:
  - British wild species (20 volumes)
  - Planted exotics (10 volumes)
- The Rob, Hill and Chisholm collections amounting to 29 wallets of material.
- The Thomas 2-volume collection of British grasses.

=== Bronze implements ===
Replicas of the Roseberry Topping Bronze Age hoard, bronze axe- and spear-heads and the mould of a large axe head itself, ideal for making more axes from, are in a display case.

=== Coins and medals ===
1,900 items including commemorative medallions, badges and banknotes as well as coins and military medals. Collections include the Yearby hoard of 16th- and 17th-century coins, the Thorpe Thewles hoard of Henry II and Henry III silver pennies and the Middridge hoard of Edward I coins.

=== Costumes and textiles ===
2,400 items of women's fashions from the 20th century including shoes, hats and accessories. There is also a small collection of uniforms, including military, childrenswear, under garments, sportswear and men's suits, and an additional collection of 130 items, mostly Victorian.

=== Decorative arts, mainly ceramics and glass ===
340 items, mostly consisting of pieces from the Middlesbrough Pottery with some examples from other regional potteries and glass manufacturers. There is a small collection of pieces from the Bretby Art Pottery and Ault Pottery because of their connections with the Linthorpe Pottery. There is also a collection of 19th-century Japanese figures or okimono, possibly carved from walrus ivory.

=== Geological collection ===
A fossil (natural history) and a geological collection of rocks and minerals exists.

=== Photographs ===
This collection consists of about 3,500 prints, glass negatives and carte de visite, plus 2,190 lantern slides.

=== 1930s to 80s social, domestic and technological history ===
There are approximately 16,000 objects in the social history collections. The museum started to collect everyday objects in the 1930s, recognising that society was rapidly changing and old ways of life disappearing.

=== World cultures ===
The museum's collection of around 1,500 artefacts from different world cultures has its origins in the colonial era. Sir Alfred Pease, in addition to his hunting trophies, also gave a collection of beadwork from North-East Africa. George Lockwood Dorman within his brief life had managed to collect ethnographical items from abroad, including Australia, New Zealand, Oceania – and South Africa when he was stationed there during the Boer War. These items formed an important part of the museum's founding collections.

=== Zoological collection ===
These still represent the major part of the museum's holdings, numbering in excess of 150,000 specimens. The bulk of the collections are made up of invertebrates, especially molluscs and insects. A popular seasonal item was a beehive in an acrylic glass case with an exit through a side window, allowing to seeing the bees at work.

=== Archive and ephemera ===
The museum has archived materials related to the wider collections. The ephemera collection spans the booming period of Middlesbrough and is wide-ranging, consisting of commercial printed materials such as posters, invoices, letterheads, and newspaper cuttings relating to Middlesbrough events and people.

== Permanent display galleries ==
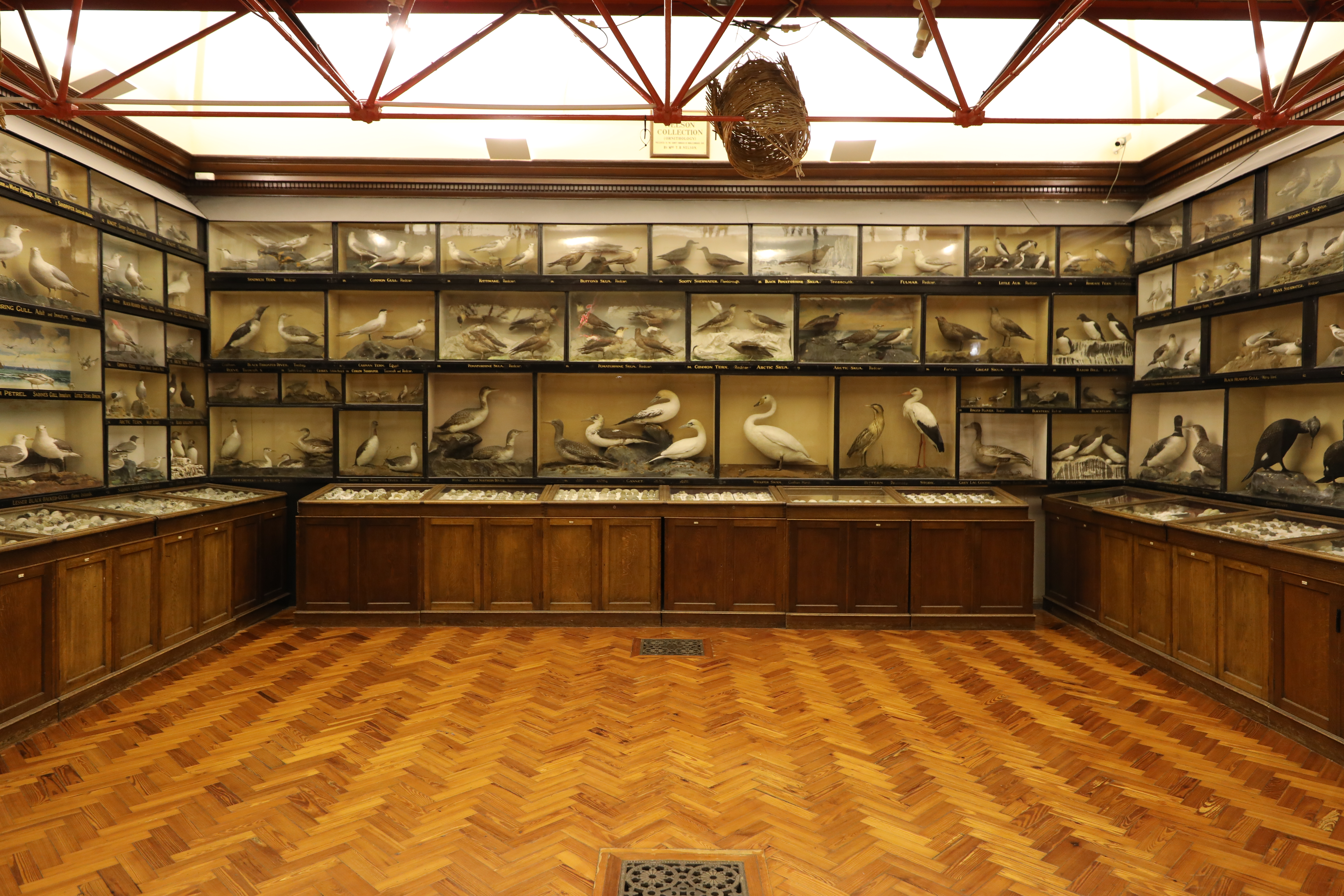
The Nelson Room

20th Century Woman – Examining the major social and political changes of the last century and how they have shaped the lives of women in Middlesbrough.

Earth in Space – A look at how our planet has become and continues to be affected by cosmic, geological and biological forces.

Four Corners – The origins of the museum's collections and the persons behind the objects. Natural sciences, ethnography and archaeology are shown together according to their countries of origin.

H_{2}O – A stimulating discovery space based around the theme of water with lots to handle and explore.

Linthorpe Art Pottery – A small pottery in late 19th-century Middlesbrough produced some of the most collectible art pottery, which became so popular that even Princess Alexandra purchased a turquoise Linthorpe Art Pottery vase. Much of the output was designed or influenced by Christopher Dresser and in its short 10-year life the pottery produced over 2000 different mould shapes, as well as winning two bronze medals and one gold medal at several national and international exhibitions.

The Nelson Room – A 19th-century collection of mounted birds and eggs amassed by renowned local ornithologist Thomas Hudson Nelson who wrote The Birds of Yorkshire (1907), and has been maintained in its original Edwardian setting since it was bequeathed by Nelson's wife in 1918.

Town in Time – The town of Middlesbrough was granted a charter in 1853 but its history stretches back thousands of years. Town in Time features two galleries crammed with artefacts and stories about the town and its people.

Lordship of Acklam Plan – Hanging in the double height space of the new Dorman Museum extension is a remarkable and unique historic plan. Measuring around 13 feet square this plan, painted on sailcloth, shows the extent and detail of the Lordship of Acklam Estates.
