= William Ault =

English potter

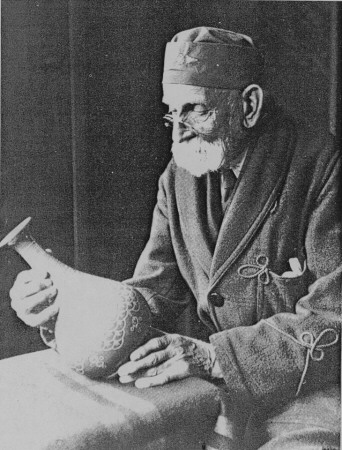
William Ault

William Ault (1842 – 12 March 1929) was an English potter, involved with a number of companies in the Staffordshire potteries and South Derbyshire making art pottery and more utilitarian wares.

In 1883 he established the Bretby Art Pottery (formally Henry Tooth & Co.) with Henry Tooth, who had left the Linthorpe Art Pottery, of which he was co-founder. This was initially based in Church Gresley in Derbyshire, but later moved to Woodville, Derbyshire, nearby. In 1887 Ault established the Ault Pottery, formally William Ault & Co, in Swadlincote, also in Derbyshire. Their art pottery was mostly branded as Ault Faience, regardless of the material.

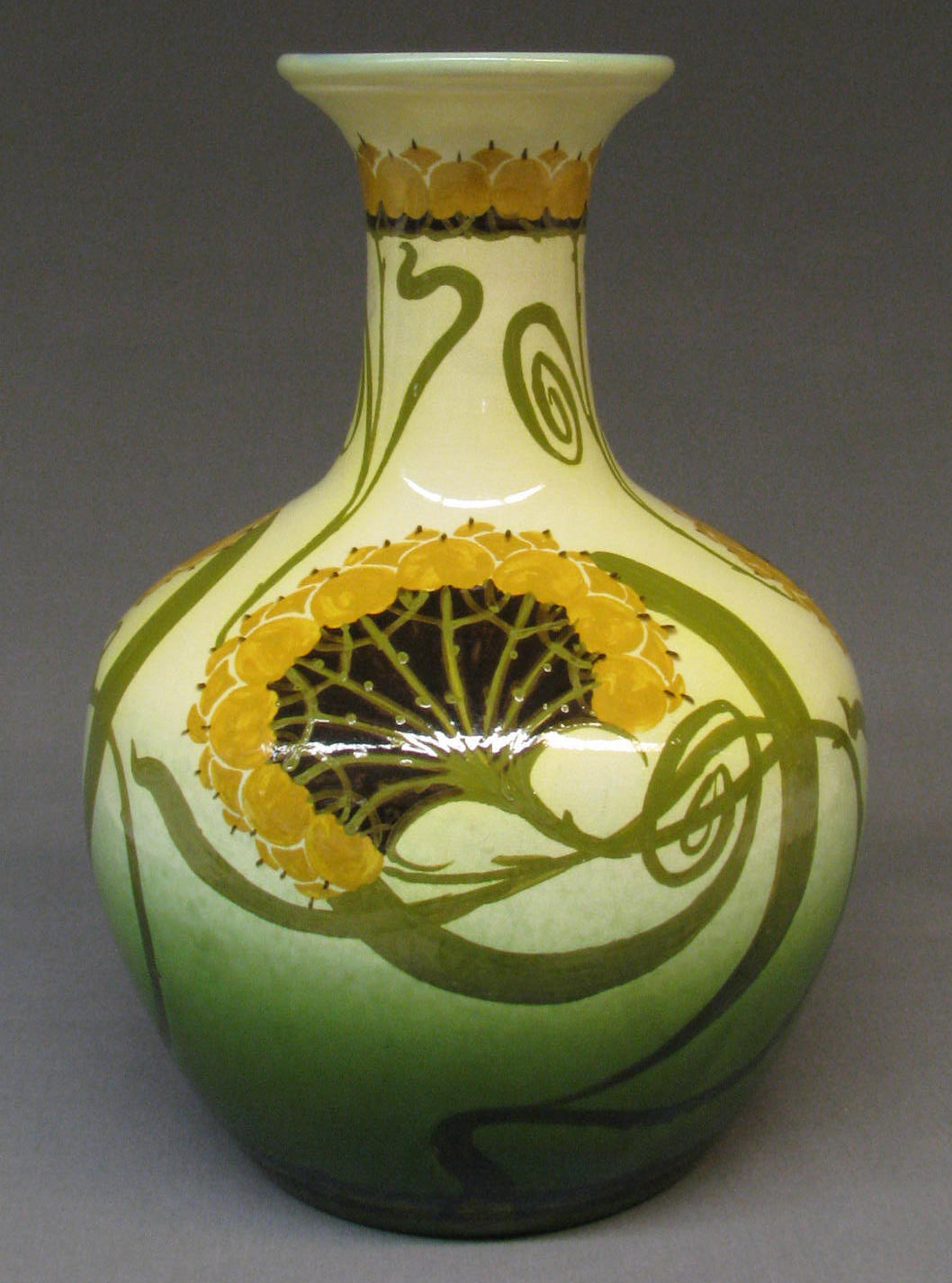
Ault Pottery vase painted by Clarissa Ault, c. 1890.

Their most interesting and sought-after wares use designs by Christopher Dresser. These firstly resulted from the purchase of some of the Linthorpe Art Pottery's moulds for Dresser designs, after this went out of business in 1889–91. Ault's company continued to use some Dresser moulds until the 1920s. Other moulds were bought by Tooth and the Torquay Terracotta Company. Dresser also worked directly for Ault as a freelance designer, from 1892 to at least 1896. Their other wares were often larger pieces such as jardinières. William Ault's daughter Clarissa Ault, who initialed her pieces "CJA", was the leading painter; her sister Gertrude was also a decorator.

== Career ==
Ault was born at Bagnall, near the centre of the English pottery industry at Stoke-on-Trent, and started his career as a "packing boy" in a pottery at Longton, where he was gradually promoted to management. He ran the Bretby Art Pottery 1883–1887, then William Ault & Co, selling goods as "Ault Pottery" and "Ault Faience". He was also a Methodist lay preacher.

The firm merged with the Ashby Potters' Guild in Woodville in 1919, the formal name becoming at first "Ault and Tunnicliffe", Pascoe Tunnicliffe being the new Works Director. The wares were initially called "Aultcliff" and then from 1937 "Ault Potteries Ltd". William Ault had retired in 1922, when he was 80, and the business was wound up in the 1930s, ending as part of Pearsons of Chesterfield.

Ault died at his home (Brookland, Ashby-de-la-Zouch) on 12 March 1929.

== Dresser period ==
Dresser's contract with Ault, signed in May 1893, paid £400 over three years, and specified that a stamped signature ("Chr. Dresser") should be used as a mark on his designs. It also specified he should travel to the factory twice a year, with first-class train expenses and a guinea a day for hotel costs (Dresser lived in Barnes, London, then in Surrey), for up to three days. On his visit he was to "inspect the production of objects", "instruct the workmen" and "criticise objects already made". Dresser's designs were decorated in a variety of ways in the Ault factory, including some painted with plant or animal scenes and the like, which do not really match Dresser's elegant geometrical shapes.

An Ault Pottery pattern book including over 900 drawn pottery designs by many different hands, and some cryptic notes apparently relating to payments to Dresser, was unveiled by the Dorman Museum in Linthorpe in 2015; they also have a collection of Dresser/Ault pieces. They had bought the book in 2013/14 from someone who had found it "saved from a skip in the 1960s" when working for Pearsons. Some 40–50 of the designs were thought to be by Dresser, including several well known ones, and it was hoped that study might be able to confirm that other designs were by him.

Ault Pottery, Christopher Dresser shapes (earthenware unless stated)

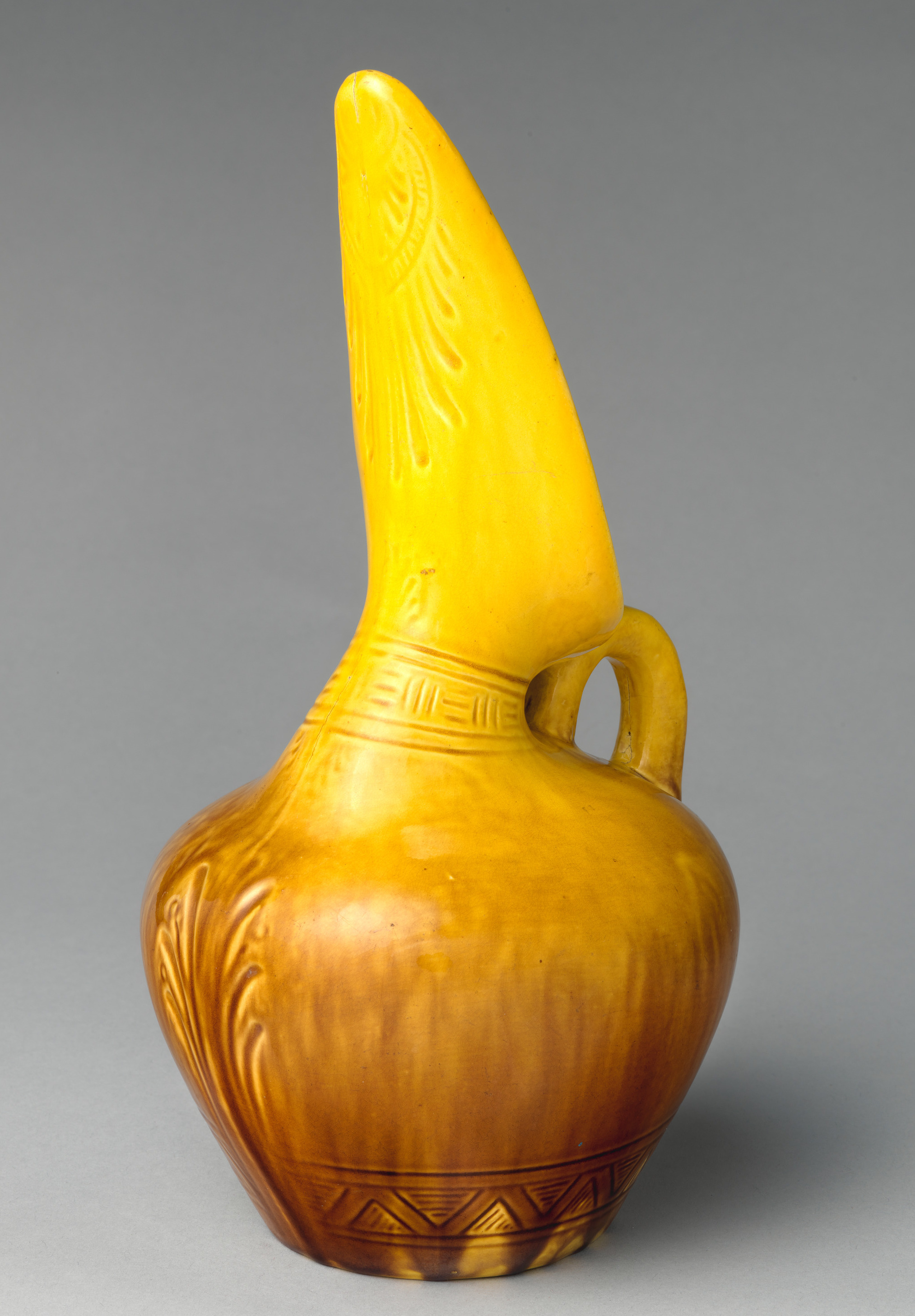
Christopher Dresser jug, 1892-96, Ault Pottery using ex-Linthorpe moulds.

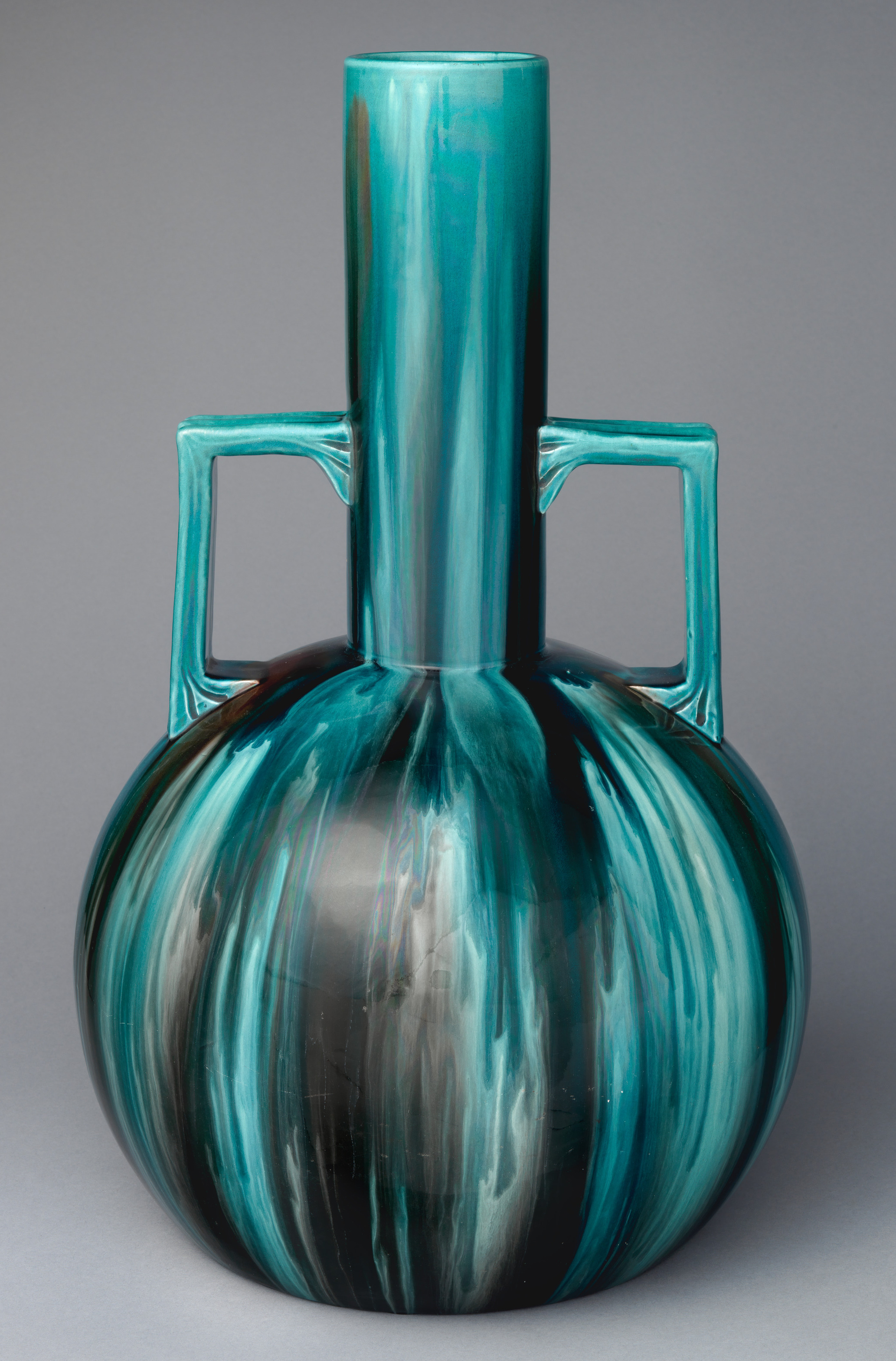
Vase, 1892-94, at 50 cm tall one of Dresser's largest designs, an original for Ault Pottery (in other colours at V&A)

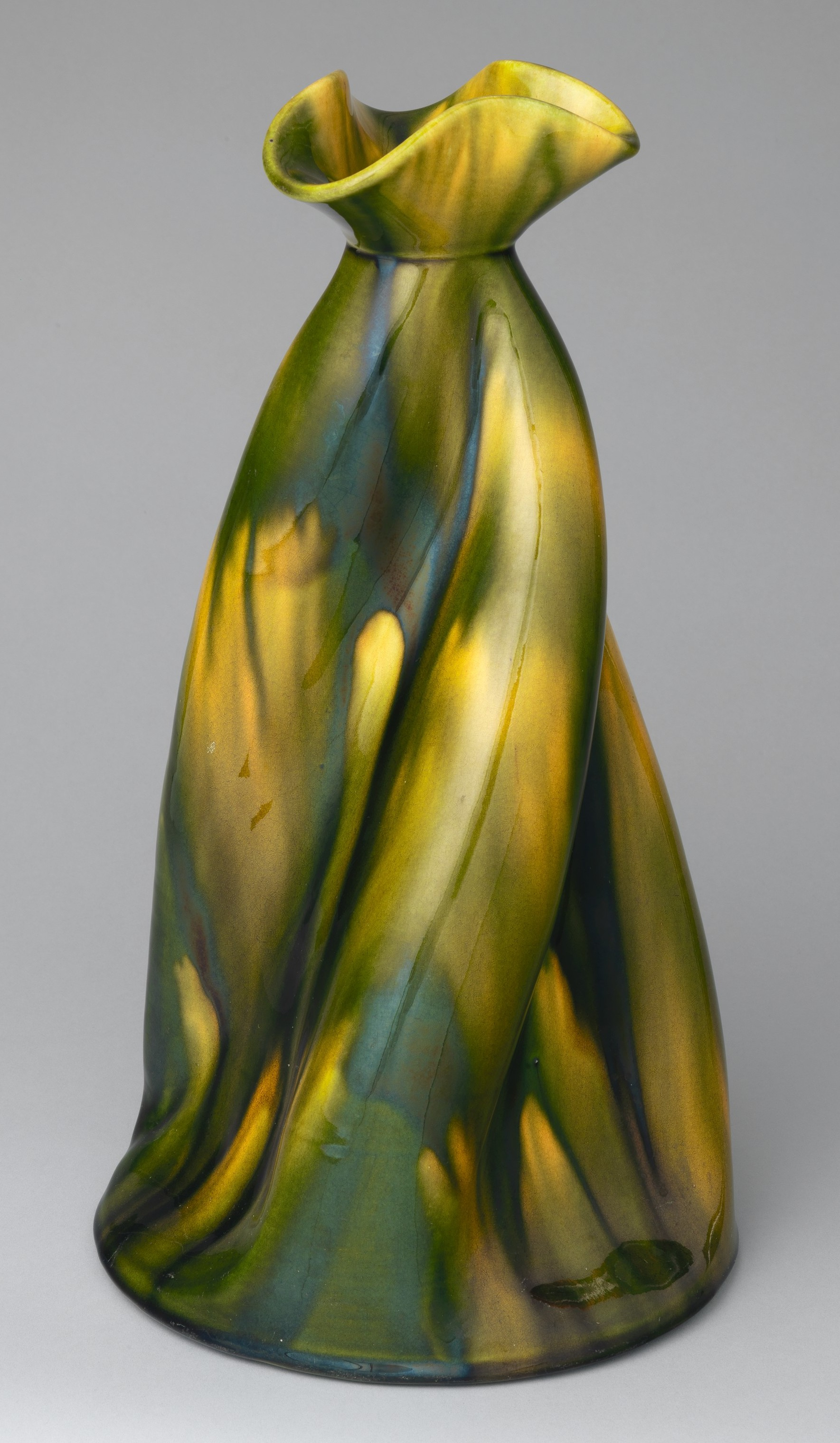
Dresser spiral vase, 1893 (in other colours at V&A)

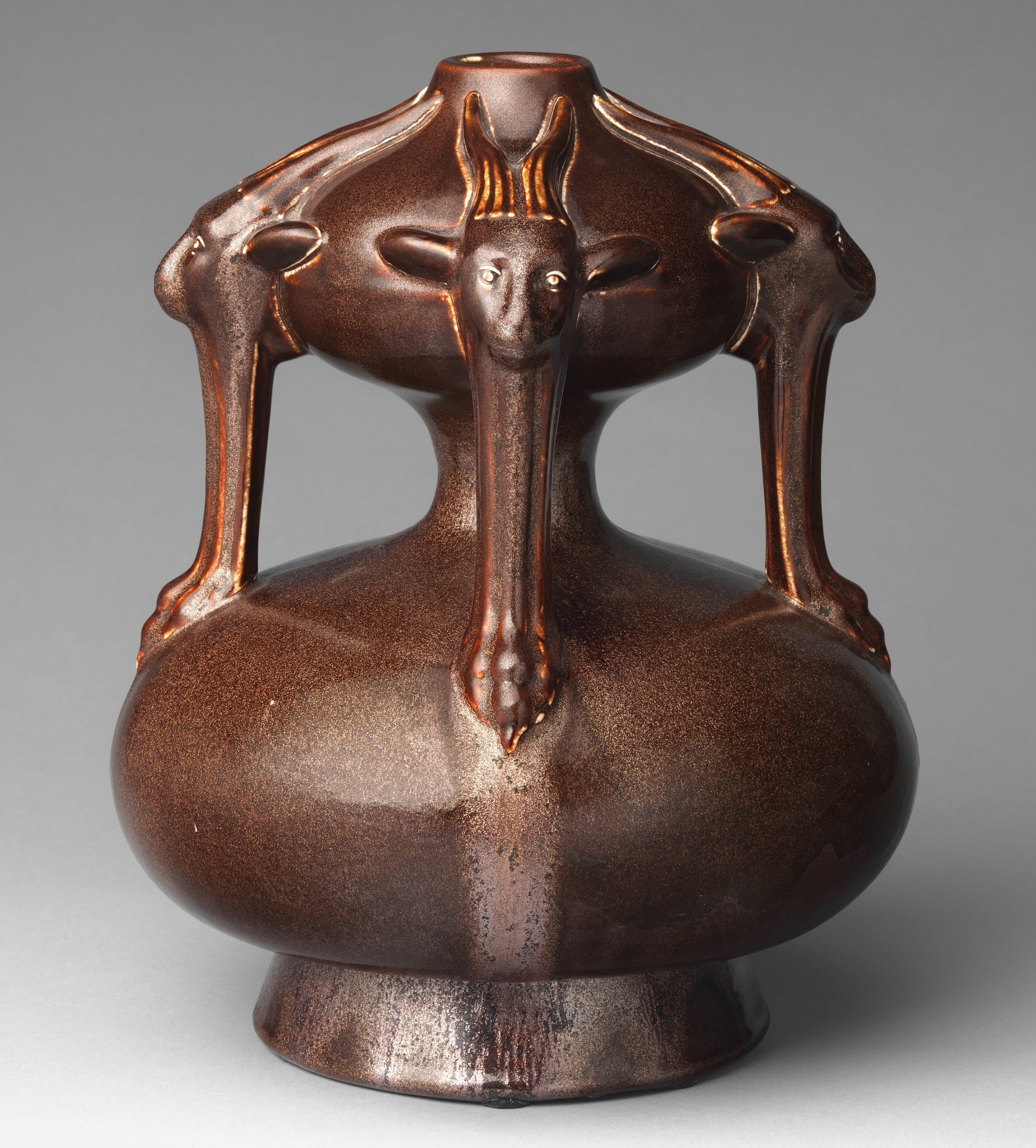
Stoneware Dresser vase with goat masks, 1904, one of his original designs for Ault (in other colours at V&A)

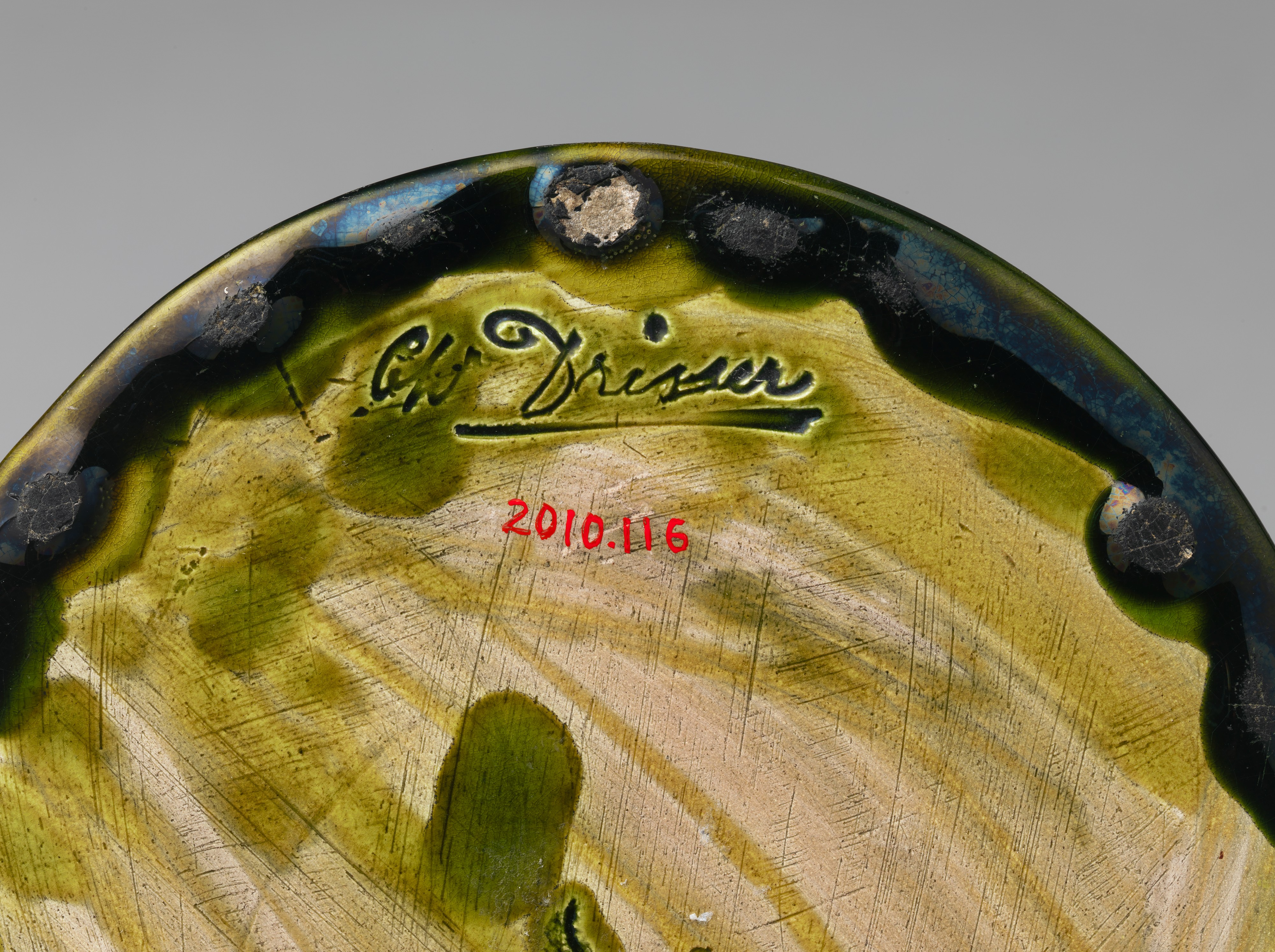
Stamped "Chr Dresser" signature mark, from the spiral vase, 1893
