= Linthorpe Art Pottery =

Former ceramic maker in Middlesbrough, England

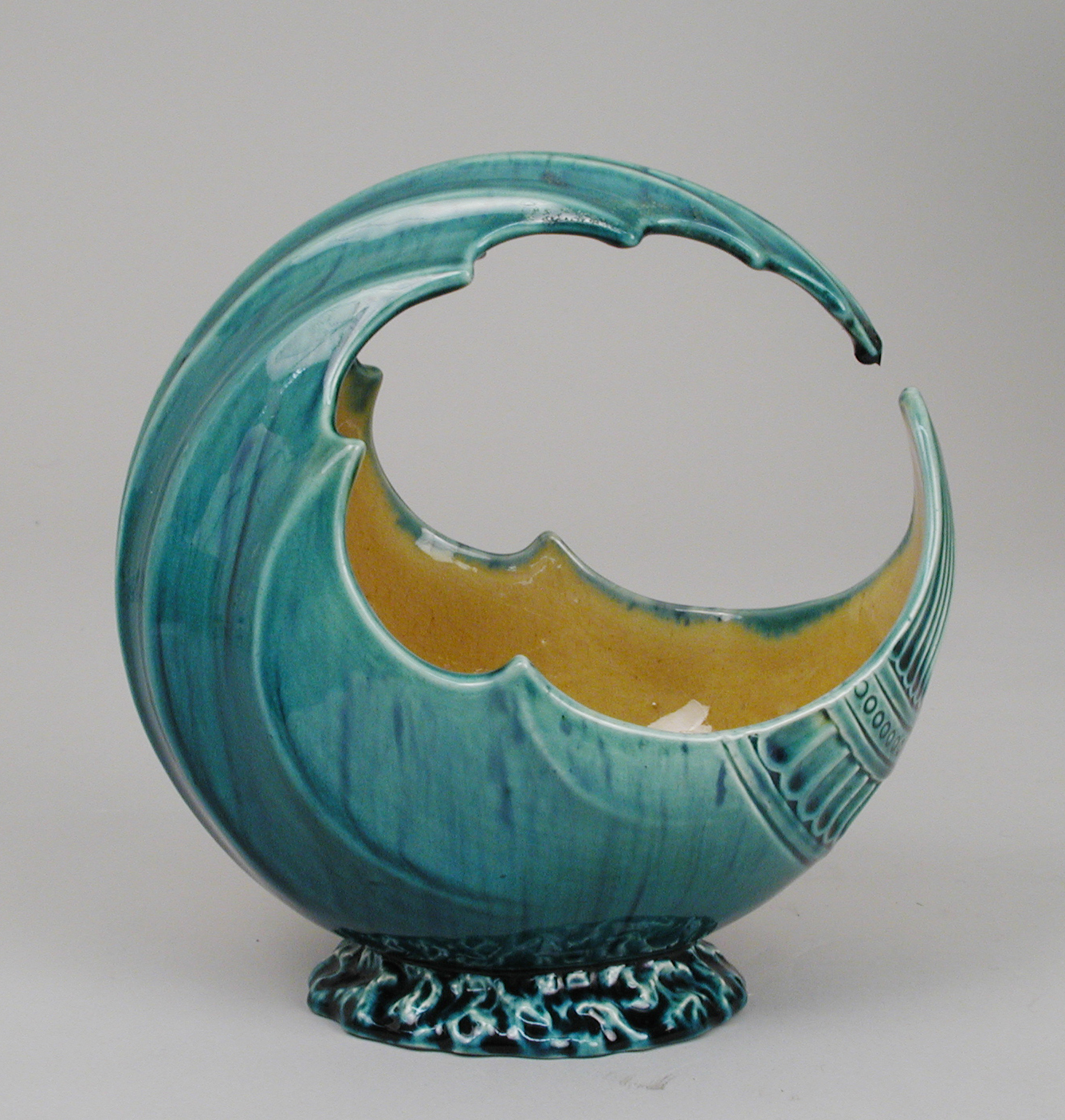
Wave bowl, c. 1880

Linthorpe Art Pottery was a British pottery that operated between 1878 and 1890 in Linthorpe, Middlesbrough. It produced art pottery, and is especially known for the early collaboration of the designer Christopher Dresser; many of the early wares have his impressed signature.

== History ==
The Linthorpe Art Pottery was a born of a collaboration between the leading Orientalist and designer Christopher Dresser and local businessman, John Harrison, who was the proprietor of the Sun Brick Works based in Linthorpe village. The men are said to have had a prior acquaintance and that Dresser suggested to him that he might profitably re-purpose his brickworks into the production of ceramics that had not previously been attempted in Europe. It is also claimed that they sought to alleviate some of the conditions of unemployment in Middlesbrough, which was a consequence of the Long Depression and its dependence on the iron and steel industries for employment.

Harrison undertook an initial pilot in 1879, which presumably ran alongside the existing brickworks, with Dresser acting as Art Superintendent, designing the new Linthorpe Ware; a thrower was drafted from the Issac Wilson and Co Pottery in Middlesbrough; the first firing was overseen by the kiln manager from the William Smith pottery in Stockton. Following this initial success Harrison decided to expand production and Dresser recommended the hiring of Henry Tooth, an artist from Buckinghamshire who was then working on the Isle of Wight as a suitable manager for the pottery. Having no previous ceramic experience he spent some time training at the T G Green Pottery in Derbyshire.

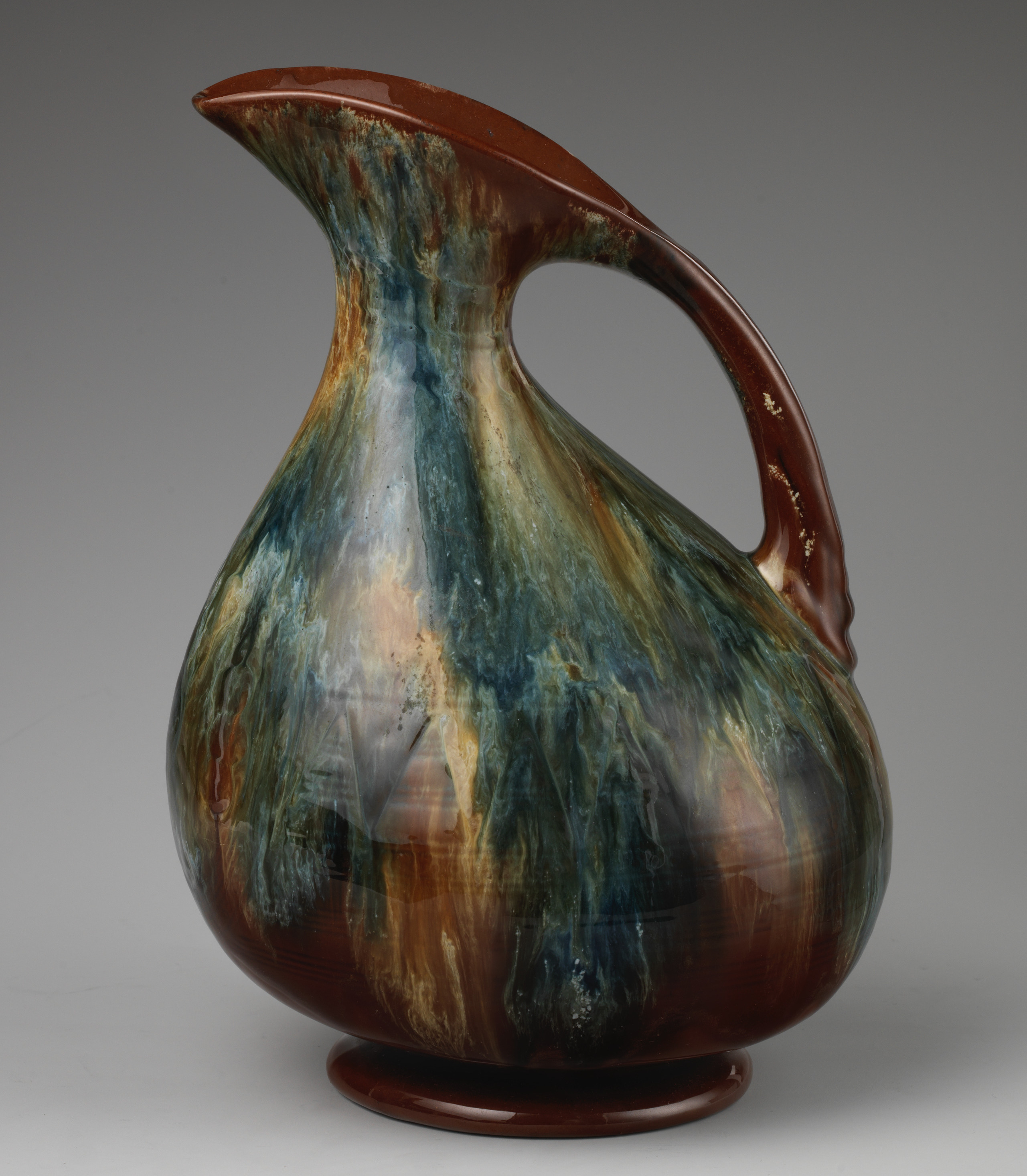
Jug, 1879-82

The pottery was innovative in its use of the local red brick clay, previously used by the brickworks, which was supplemented by white clay imported from Cornwall by the mid-1880s. It was also the first pottery in the country to use gas-powered kilns to fire the ceramics, which allowed it to experiment with running and special effect glazes for which it became well known. This combined with the designs of Dresser, who designed over a 1,000 individual pieces for the pottery during their collaboration, many of which can now be found in collections as wide-ranging as the Dorman Museum in Linthorpe, the British Museum, the Victoria and Albert Museum the Metropolitan Museum of Art the Cooper–Hewitt, Smithsonian Design Museum and the Los Angeles County Museum of Art.

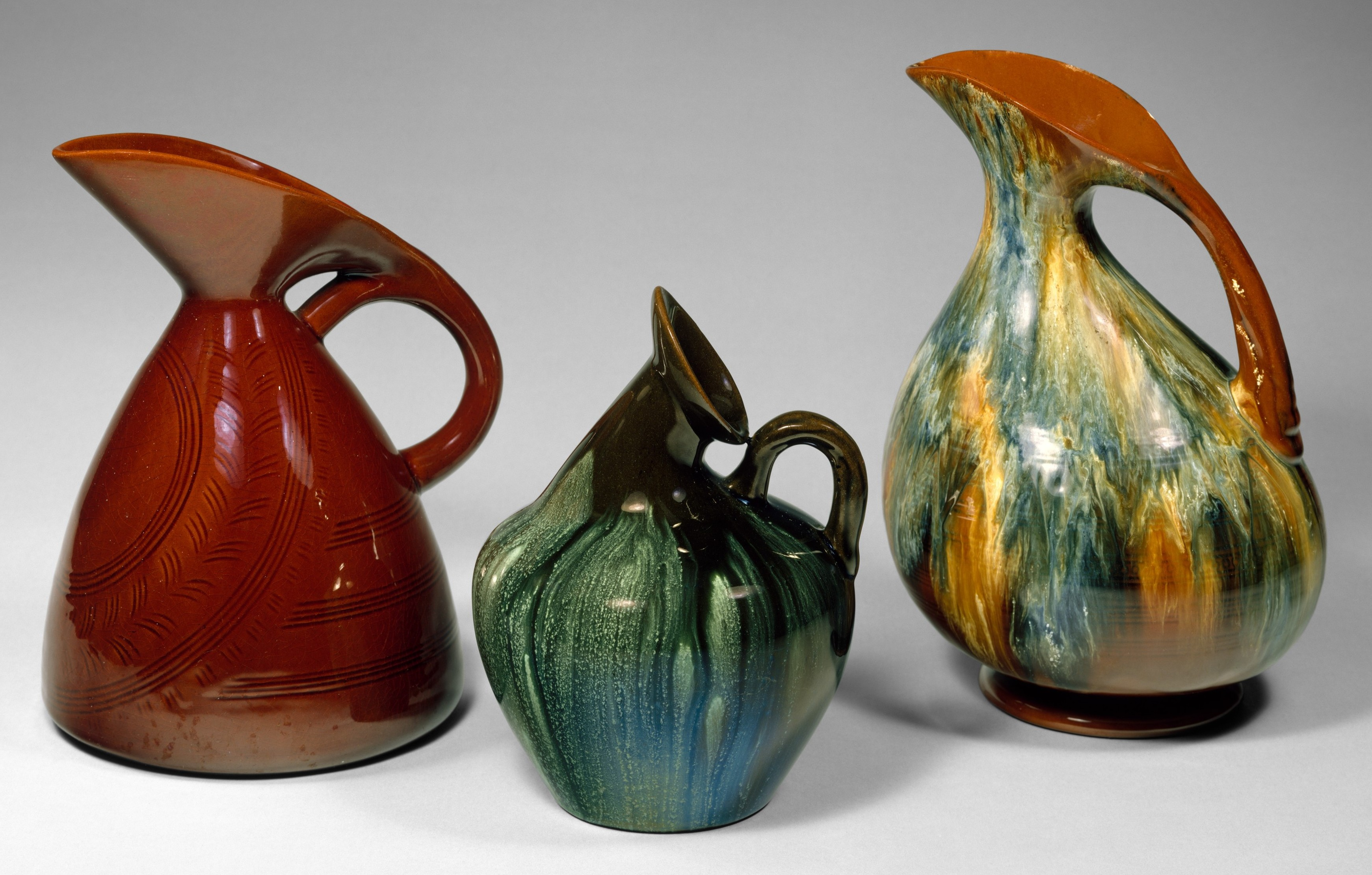
Three jugs by Dresser

Between 1880 and 1881 Harrison issued a prospectus proposing to establish a Linthorpe Art Works Company, which would also produce wallpapers, glass and beaten and decorative metals. It was hoped to issue a 1,000 shares at £5 per share, raising £50,000, however, no public offering was ever made and it is after the failure of this proposal that the collaboration with Dresser, who would have received shares had the venture succeeded, seems to have waned. Henry Tooth, who was named as manager of the proposed works in the prospectus, left in early 1882 to establish the Bretby Pottery with William Ault and was succeeded in his role by Richard Patey.

Linthorpe Art Pottery achieved national and international recognition starting in 1882 when it was exhibited at the Society of Arts Exhibition of Modern English Pottery; in 1883 it was shown at the Calcutta International Exhibition and was awarded a bronze medal; in 1884 it was shown at the World's Industrial and Cotton Centennial Exposition in New Orleans and was awarded a bronze medal; and in 1885 it was shown at the International Inventions Exhibition of 1885 in South Kensington, where it received both a Diploma of Merit and a Gold Medal, and where Princess Alexandra is said to have purchased a turquoise vase, exciting considerable interest in the pottery by the general public.

The pottery ran into difficulties in the late 1880s, due in part to the rising cost of materials and saturation of the market by similar products produced by the Bretby pottery formed by a partnership between potter William Ault and Henry Tooth, amongst others. In 1889 John Harrison was made bankrupt by the collapse of the Onward Building Society and he succumbed to pneumonia shortly thereafter, dying at only 45. His estate allowed the pottery to continue into 1890 as a going concern, however, it was finally closed permanently when the works were sold by public auction on 10 April 1891.

=== Legacy ===
The Christopher Dresser Society was established in 2013 following a £10,000 bequest made to Teesside University. It aims to develop a wider recognition of the influence of Dresser's work, as well as creating a resource for further scholarship. It was launched on 20 June 2013 with a two-day symposium and a series of events hosted by the university and Middlesbrough Institute of Modern Art.

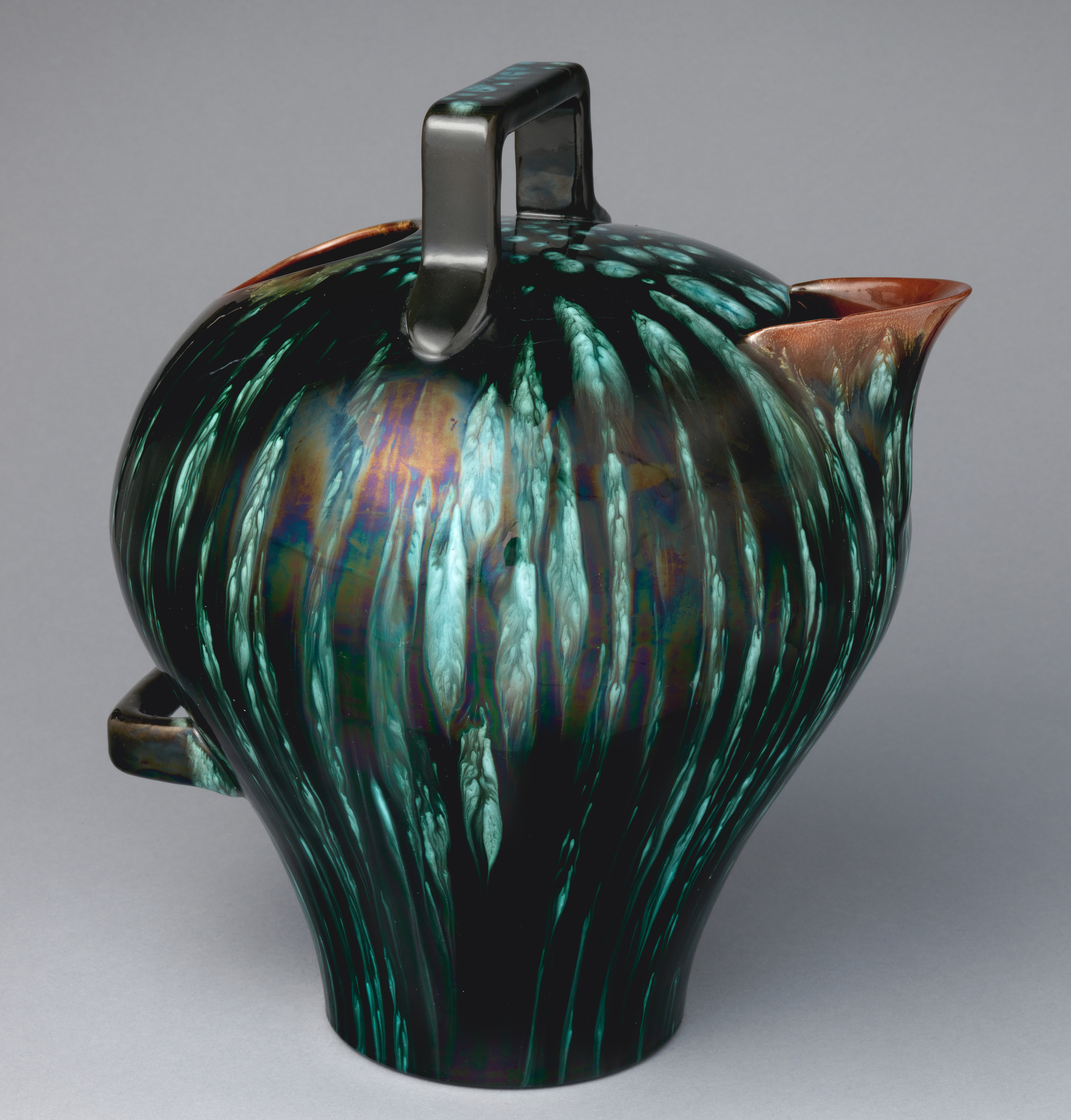
Dresser jug

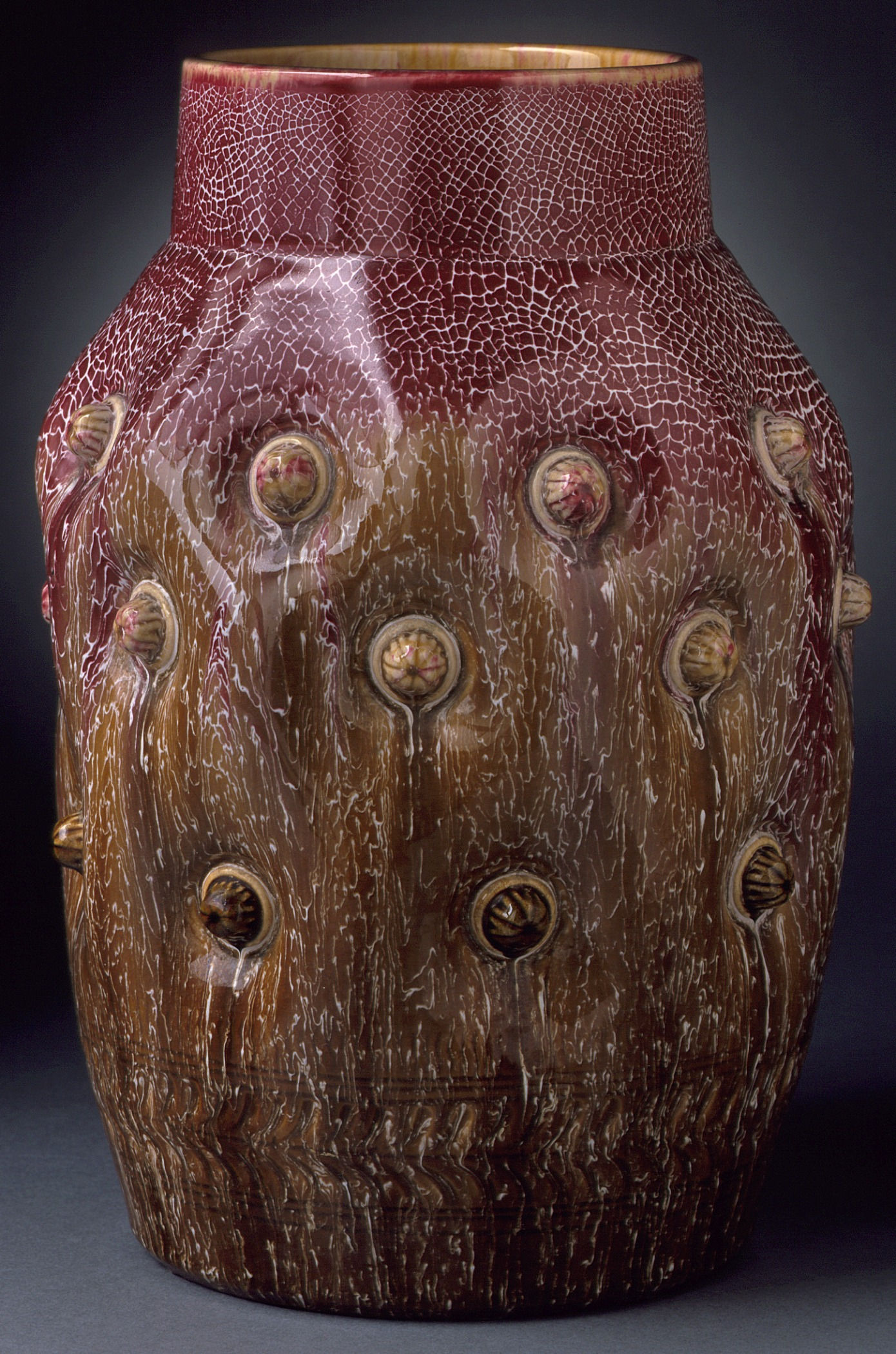
Vase

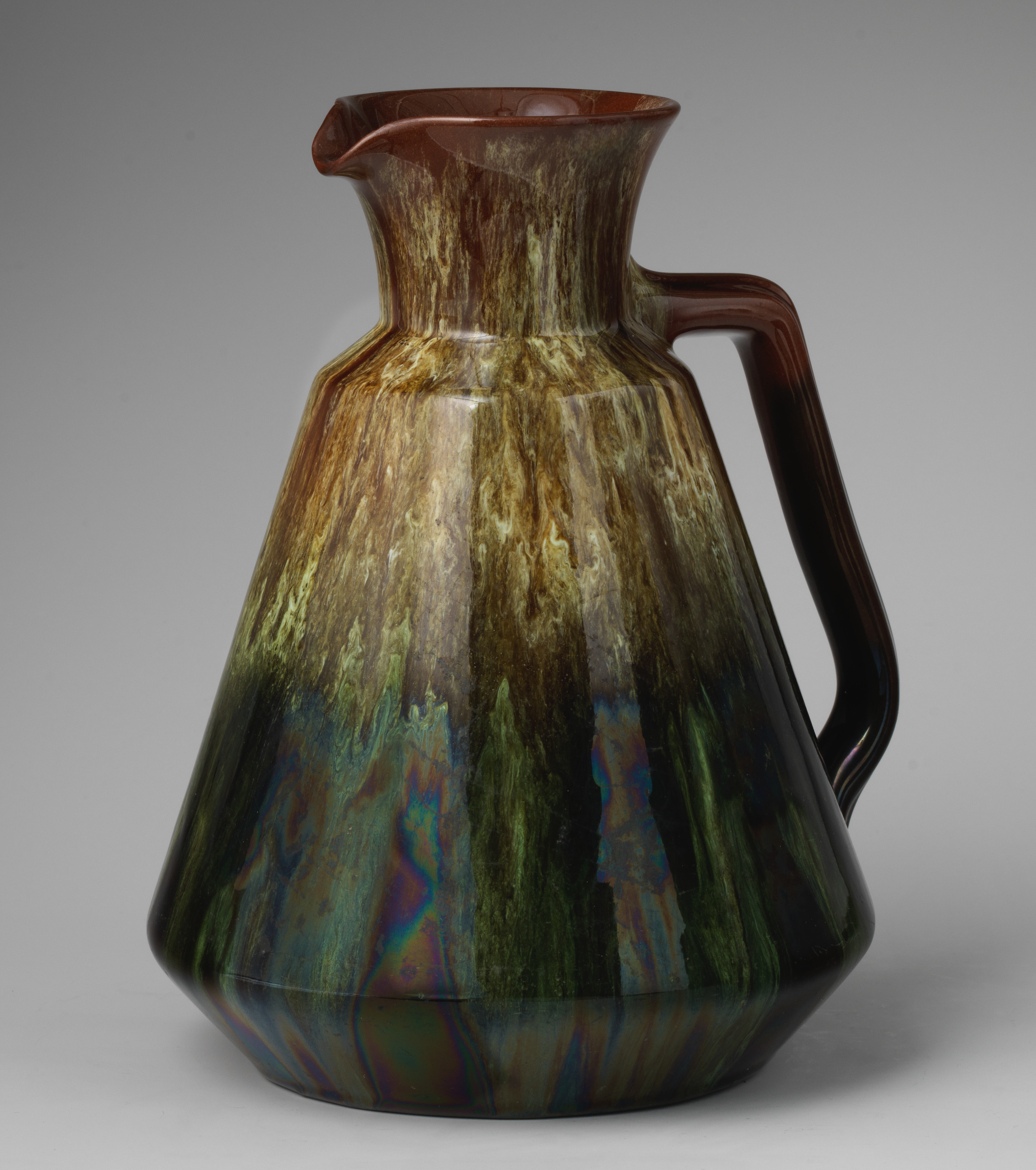
Jug

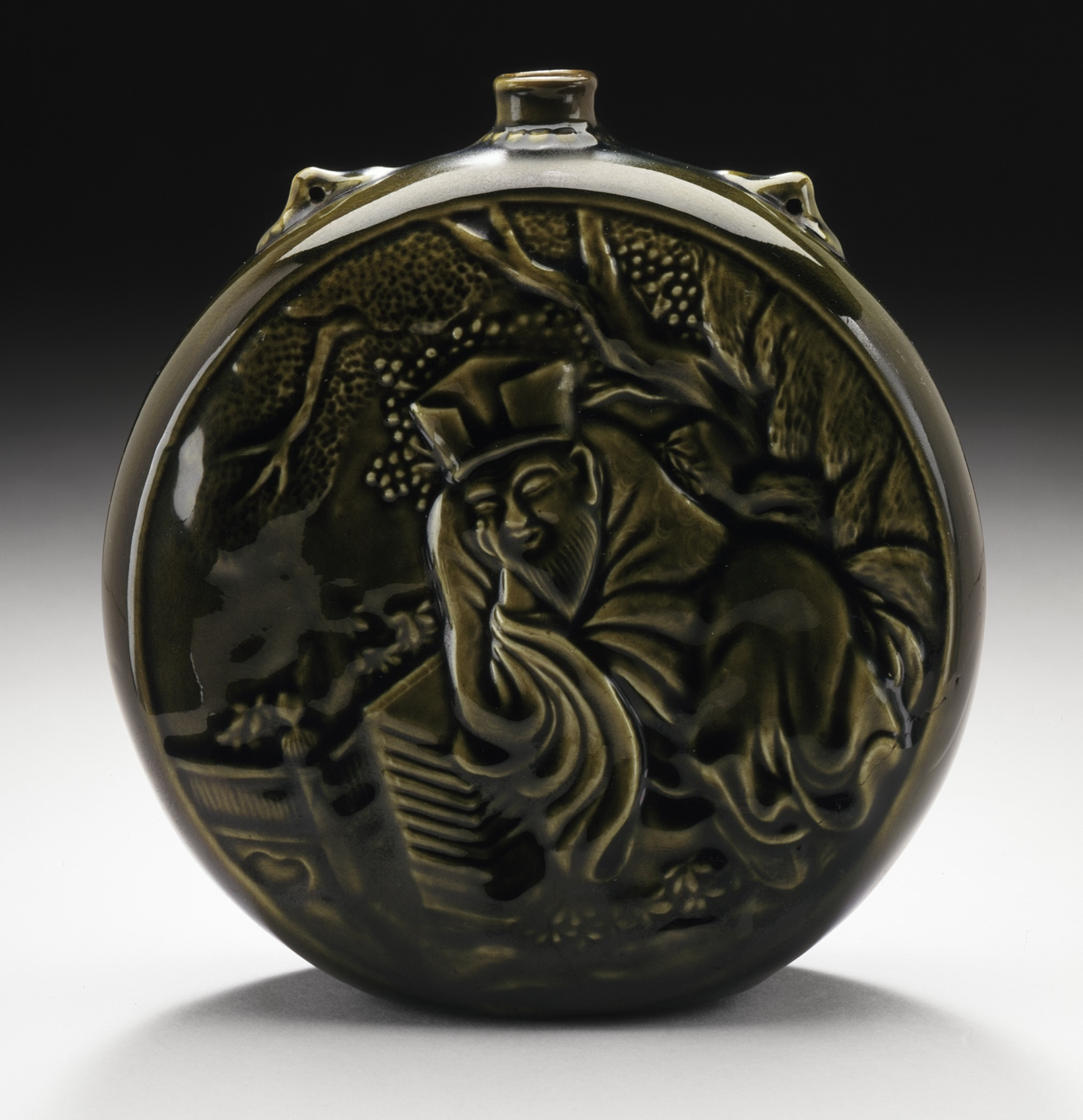
Dresser flask

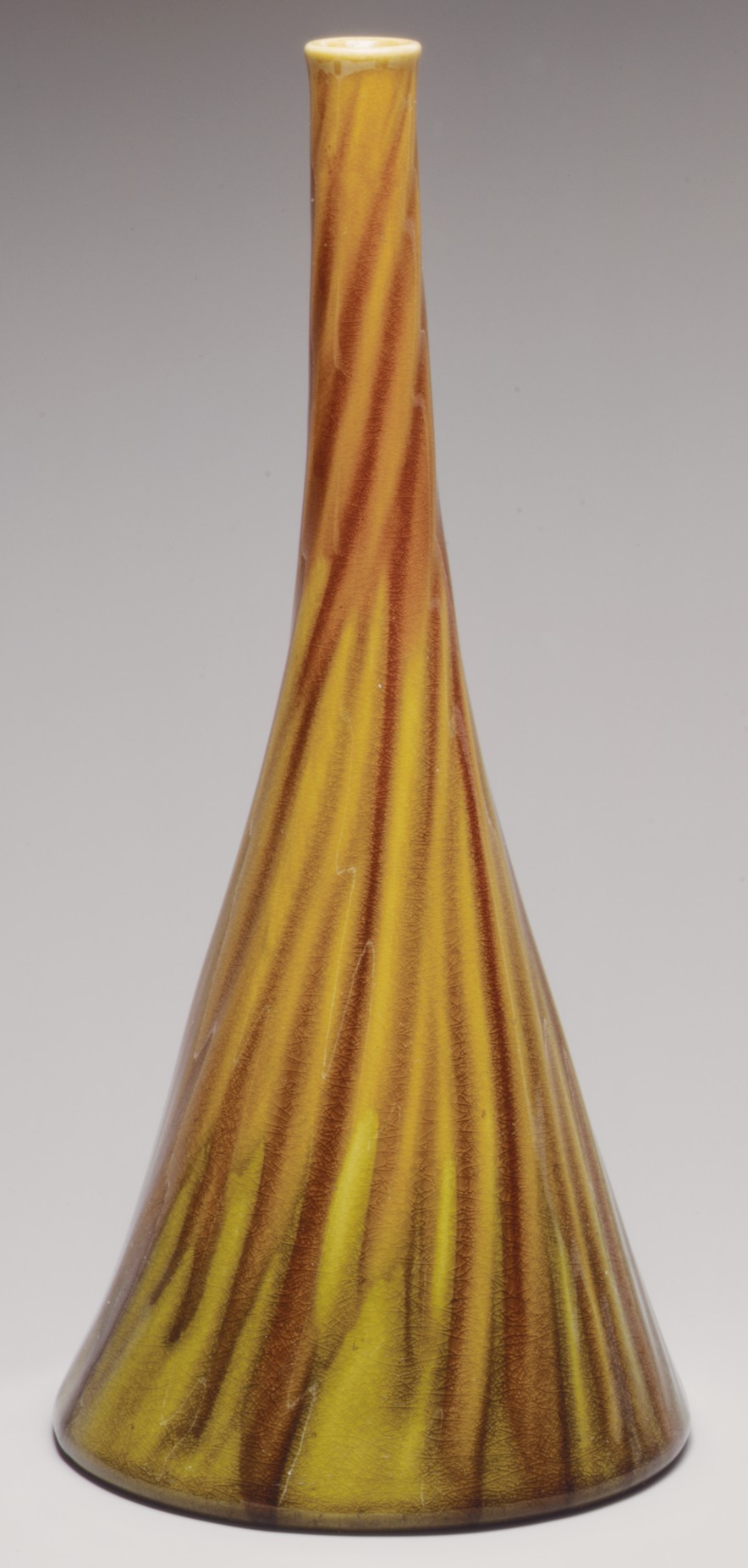
Dresser vase

== Identifying Marks ==
Linthorpe Art Pottery can have up to four identifying marks. Firstly, the factory mark, of which there are several variations, the earliest of which was the work Linthorpe impressed, this was latterly combined with the shape of mould number one, with this being registered on 14 November 1882 as a Trademark. A slight variant of this mark was used on tiles which produced raised lettering. Secondly, there was the impress of the signature of Dresser in his capacity of Art Superintendent, which would seem to identify works that are either designed or were influenced by him, notably no mould to date above the number 1700 bears his signature. Thirdly, in his capacity as pottery manager, Henry Tooth, had his monograph impressed into each piece, this practice is discontinued by his successor when Tooth departs in 1882. Finally, the majority of pieces have the mould number impressed into the base of the work. Another and fourth mark is the artists monogram. There are over 30 marks so far identified for example CP was used for Clara Pringle who specialised in floral decoration,. The artists maks are found on the base of the pottery usually in underglaze black.

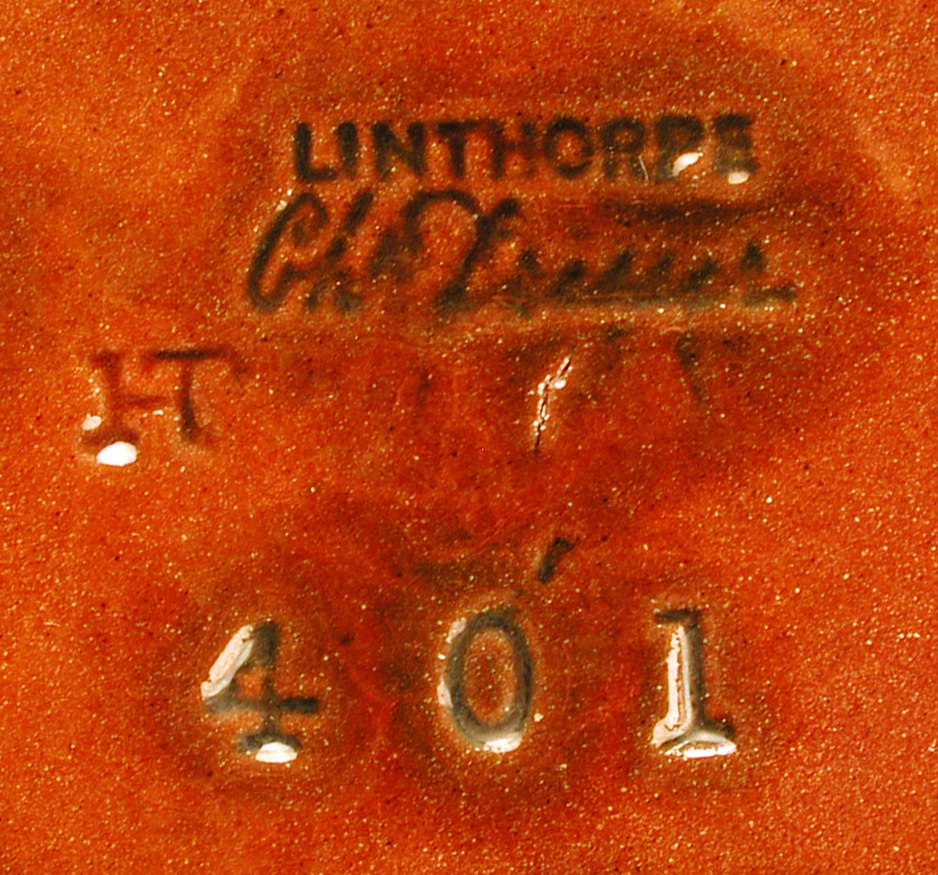
Marks, with the Dresser signature

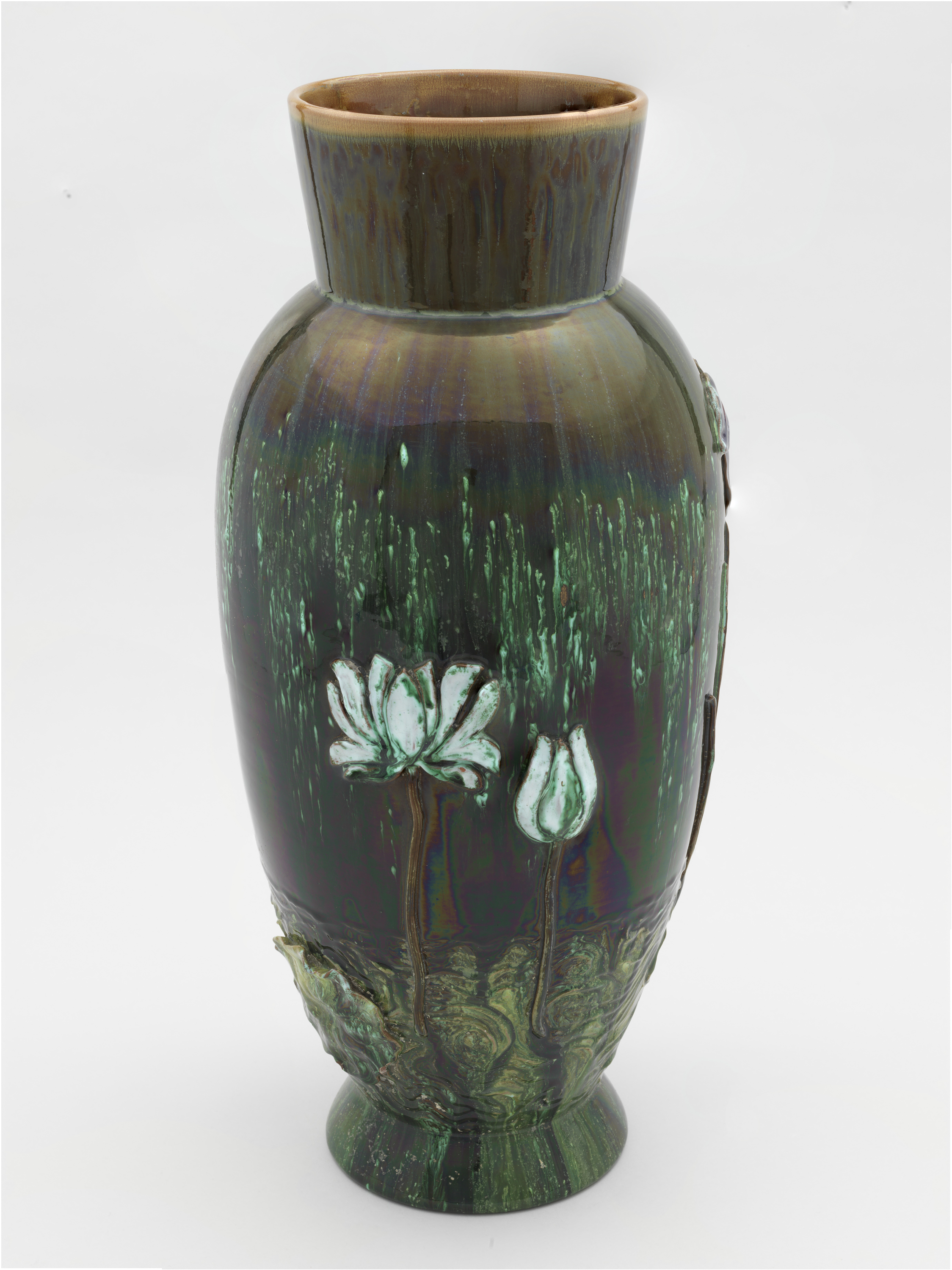
Vase, with Tooth signature
