= Bretby Art Pottery =

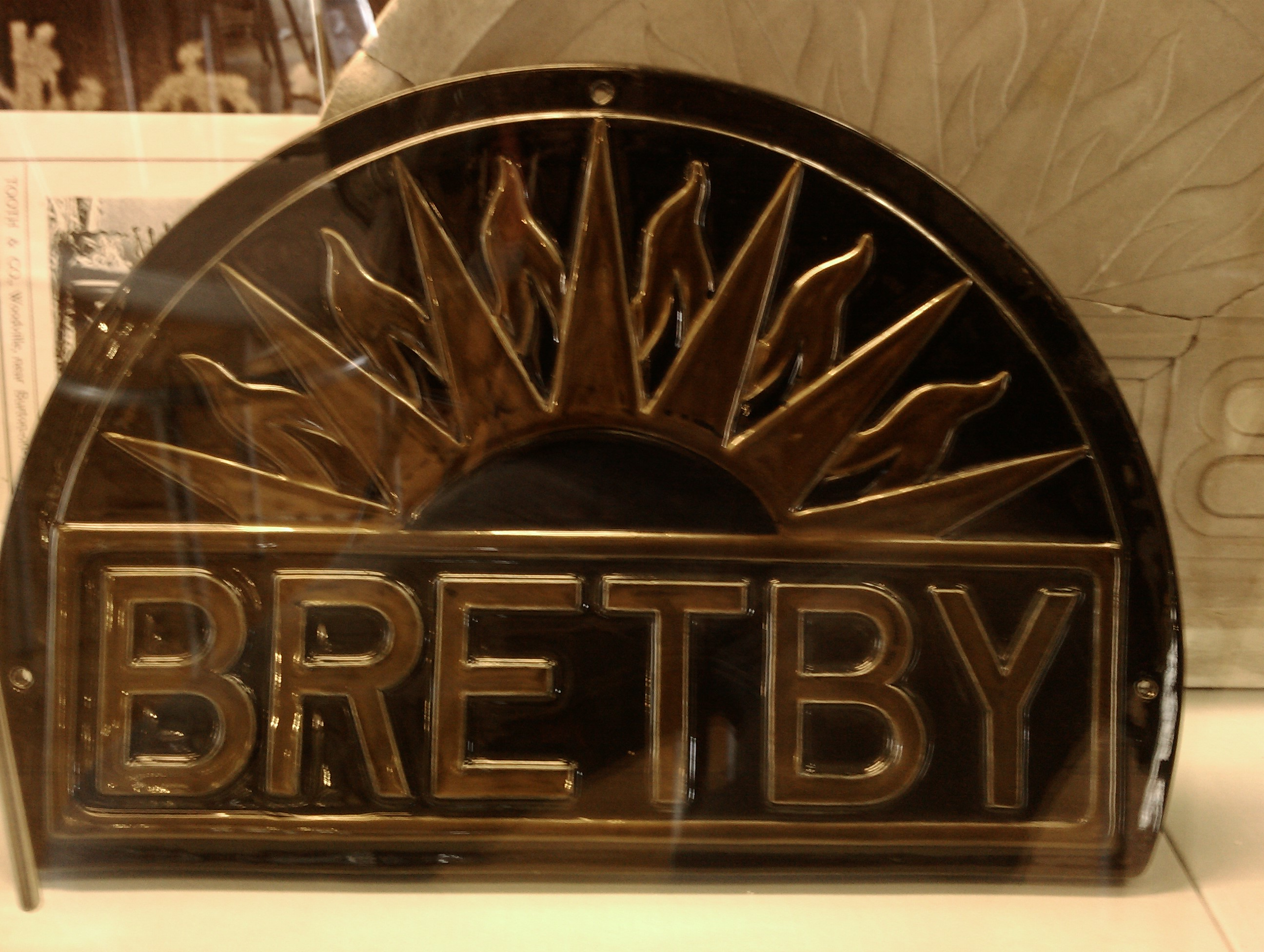
The Bretby Art Pottery 'Sunburst' trademark

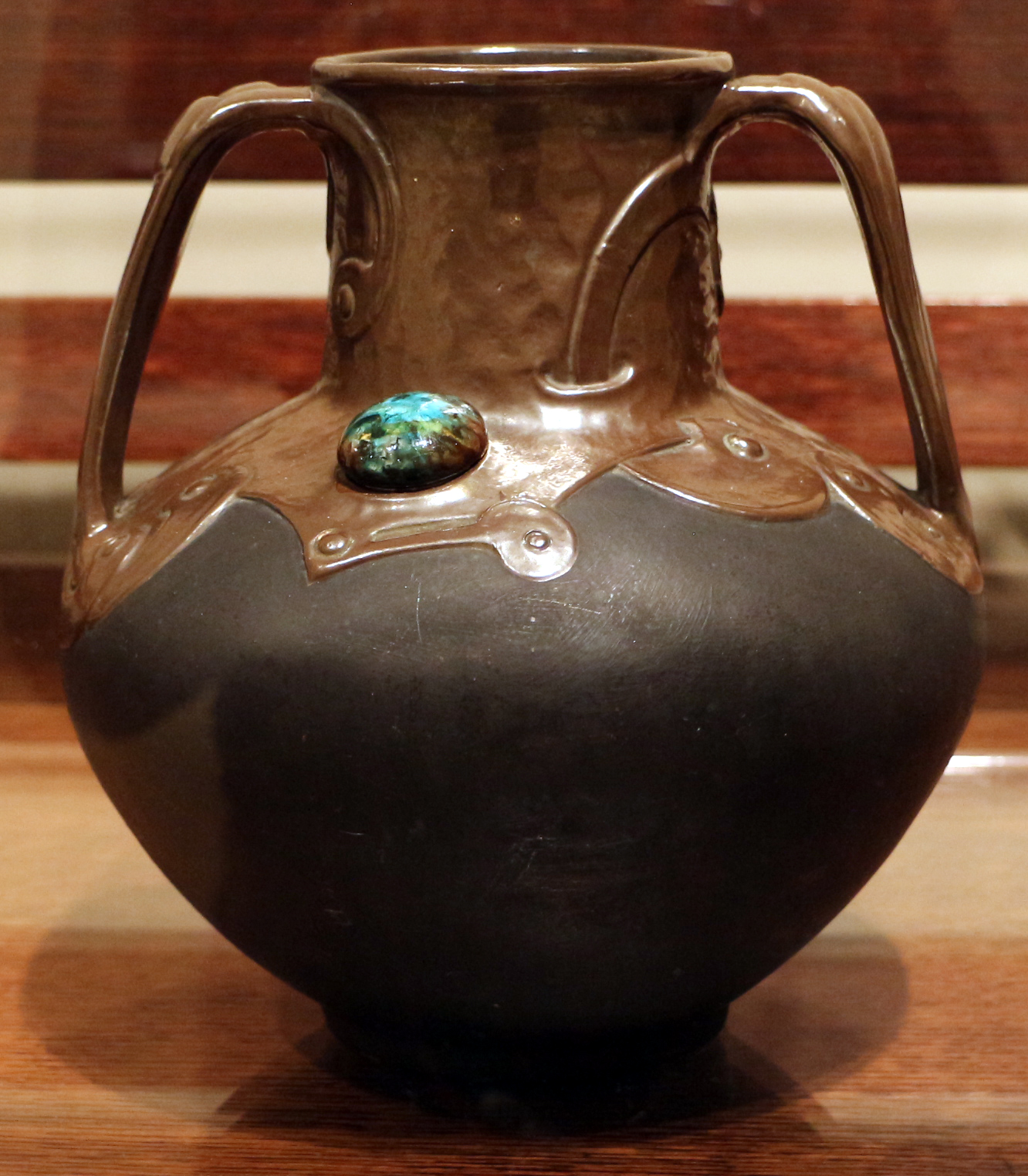
A Bretby 'Clanta' ware vase (ca 1895) in Indianapolis Museum of Art

Bretby Art Pottery was an art pottery studio founded in 1882 by Henry Tooth and William Ault in Woodville, Derbyshire, where production began on 25 October 1883. Tooth went into partnership with Ault following his successful leadership of the celebrated Linthorpe Pottery in Middlesbrough where he had been recommended as general manager by the designer Dr Christopher Dresser in 1879.

Henry Tooth continued his creative relationship with Dr Dresser and within a year his partnership with Ault had won a gold medal at the 1884 London International and Universal Exhibition, which was held at the Crystal Palace. They also registered their 'Sunburst' logo as a trademark.

The partnership between Ault and Tooth was dissolved on 1 January 1887 when William Ault set up his own pottery Ault & Co. in Midland Road, Swadlincote. Following which Bretby continued to be produced by Tooth and then his family under Tooth and Co until 1993, when the works were presumably sold, trading under the name Tooth and Company Limited until their closure in 1996.

In 1921, the company was reported in the Burton Observer and Chronicle as specialising in "several unique kinds of pottery". These included "Ligna", which looked as if it were made of antique wood and bronze. The article says that the company is well-known for its Cloisonné work.

In May 2016 the ownership of the showroom and offices, the factory itself having been demolished some years earlier, was passed to The Heritage Trust which is now trying to raise funds to restore and preserve the buildings.

== Examples in public collections ==
Sharpe's Pottery Museum in Swadlincote holds a substantial collection of early examples. Derby Museum and Art Gallery also holds a large collection.
