= Christopher Dresser =

British designer (1834–1904)

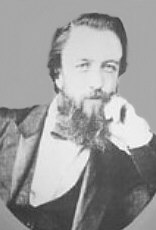
- Born: 4 July 1834; Glasgow, Scotland
- Died: 24 November 1904 (aged 70); Mulhouse, Alsace, German Empire
- Occupation: Designer

Christopher Dresser (4 July 1834 – 24 November 1904) was a Scottish designer and design theorist, now widely known as one of the first and most important independent designers. He was a pivotal figure in the Aesthetic Movement and a major contributor to the allied Anglo-Japanese or Modern Style (British Art Nouveau style), both of which originated in England and had long-lasting international influence.

== Biography ==
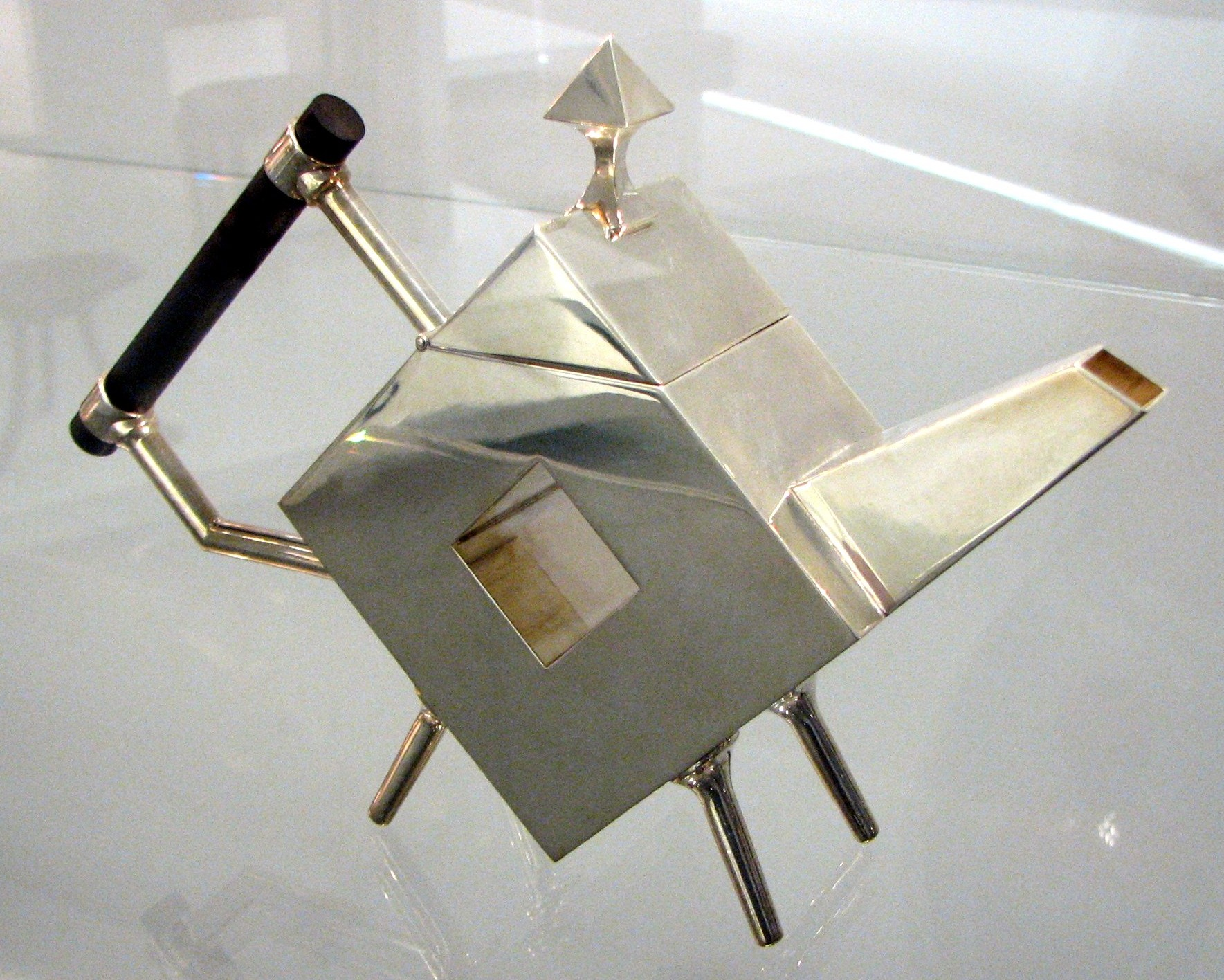
Teapot, 1879

Dresser was born in Glasgow, Scotland, of a Yorkshire family. At age 13, he began attending the Government School of Design, Somerset House, London.

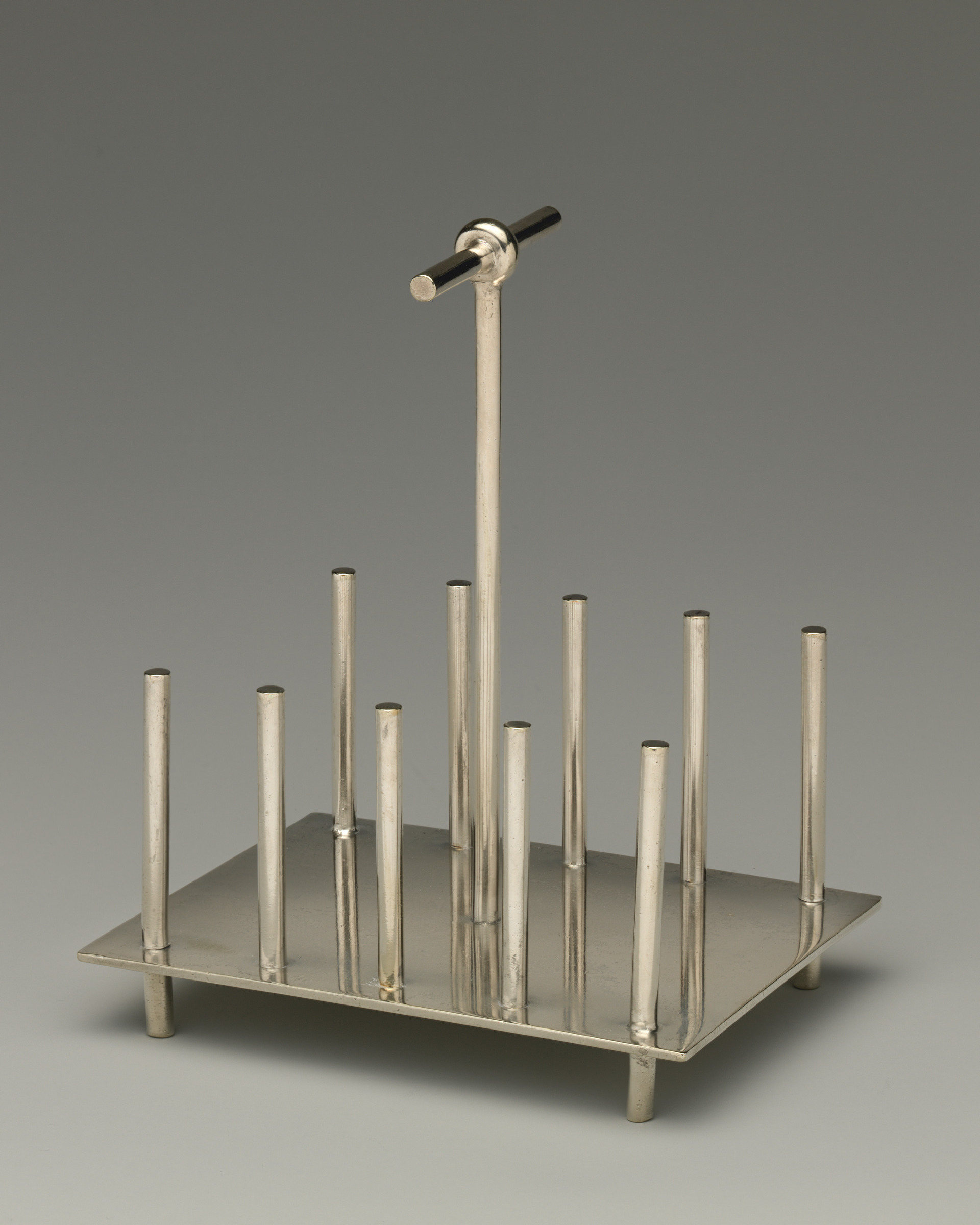
Toast rack, Hukin & Heath, 1878

From this early date his design work widened to include carpets, ceramics, furniture, glass, graphics, metalwork, including silver and electroplate, and textiles printed and woven. He claimed to have designed "as much as any man" at the International Exhibition London 1862. As early as 1865 the Building News reported that in the early part of his career he had been active as a designer of wallpapers, textiles and carpets, and the most active revolutioniser in the decorative art of the day. He wrote several books on design and ornament, including The Art of Decorative Design (1862), The Development of Ornamental Art in the International Exhibition (1862), and Principles of Design (1873), which was addressed in the preface to "working men". In 1899 The Studio magazine found it was possible to quote this book "page after page and not find a line, scarcely a word, that would not be endorsed by the most critical member of the Arts and Crafts Association today." In effect Dresser set the agenda adopted by the Arts and Crafts movement at a later date.

In 1873 he was requested by the American Government to write a report on the design of household goods.

En route for Japan in 1876 he delivered a series of three lectures in the Philadelphia Museum and School of Industrial Art and supervised the manufacture of wallpapers to his design for Wilson Fennimore. He was commissioned by Messrs Tiffany of New York to form a collection, whilst in Japan, of art objects both old and new that should illustrate the manufactures of that country.

In 1876, the British Government appointed Dresser as an emissary to Japan and sent him to visit Japan after he became associated with Japanese art in 1862, and made a number of Japanese business associates such as Kiritsu Kosho Kaisha, in the years following. In four months in 1876–1877 Dresser travelled about 2000 miles in Japan, recording his impressions in Japan, its Architecture, Art and Art-Manufactures. He represented the South Kensington Museum whilst in Japan, and was received at court by the Emperor, who ordered Dresser to be treated as a guest of the nation – all doors were open to him. He was requested by the Japanese Government to write a report on 'Trade with Europe'. His pioneering study of Japanese art is evident in much of his work which is considered typical of the Anglo-Japanese style.

From 1879 to 1882 Dresser was in partnership with Charles Holme (1848–1923) as Dresser & Holme, wholesale importers of Oriental goods, with a warehouse at 7 Farringdon Road, London.

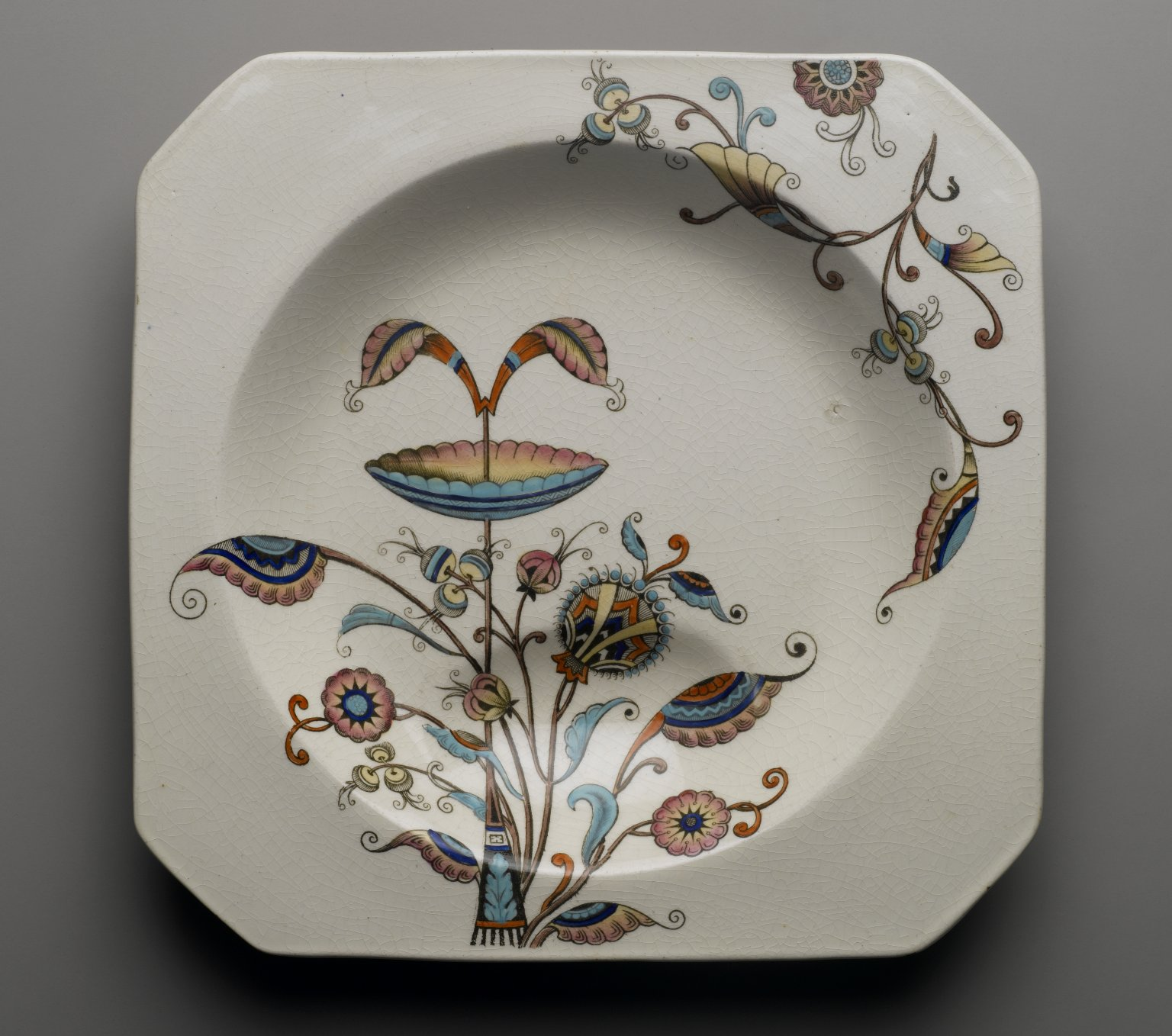
Christopher Dresser. Soup Plate, Persia Pattern, 1886 Brooklyn Museum

Between 1879 and 1882, as Art Superintendent at the Linthorpe Art Pottery in Linthorpe in Middlesbrough he designed over 1,000 pots. If his ceramic work from the 1860s onwards (for firms such as Mintons, Wedgwood, Royal Worcester, Watcombe, Linthorpe, Old Hall at Hanley and Ault) is considered, he must be amongst the most influential ceramic designers of any period. Much of his other work remains to be identified, although wallpaper designs for American, and textiles for French and German manufacturers have recently been located. A significant Dresser collection is held by the Dorman Museum in Middlesbrough. A Heritage Lottery Funded project draws attention to this.

During 1880, Dresser played a central role in the promotion of an ambitious retail venture, the Art Furnishers` Alliance Ltd. A prospectus for this company was published in August 1880, which cited Dresser as the enterprise`s "Art Superintendent". The firm`s extensive retail premises were opened in May 1881 at 157 New Bond Street in London, a newly constructed building described as "in the best position in New Bond Street".

Some of Dresser’s metalwork designs are still in production, such as his oil and vinegar sets and toast rack designs, now manufactured by Alessi. Alberto Alessi goes so far as to say Dresser 'knew the techniques of metal production better than any designer who has come to Alessi'.

One of his Old Hall designs is thought to have inspired Alan Garner's 1967 novel The Owl Service.

Dresser died in Mulhouse in 1904, during a business trip in which he intended to sell designs to local industries.

In May 1854, Dresser had married Thirza Perry (1831–1911), a daughter of the Wesleyan City Missionary, William Perry.

== Gallery ==
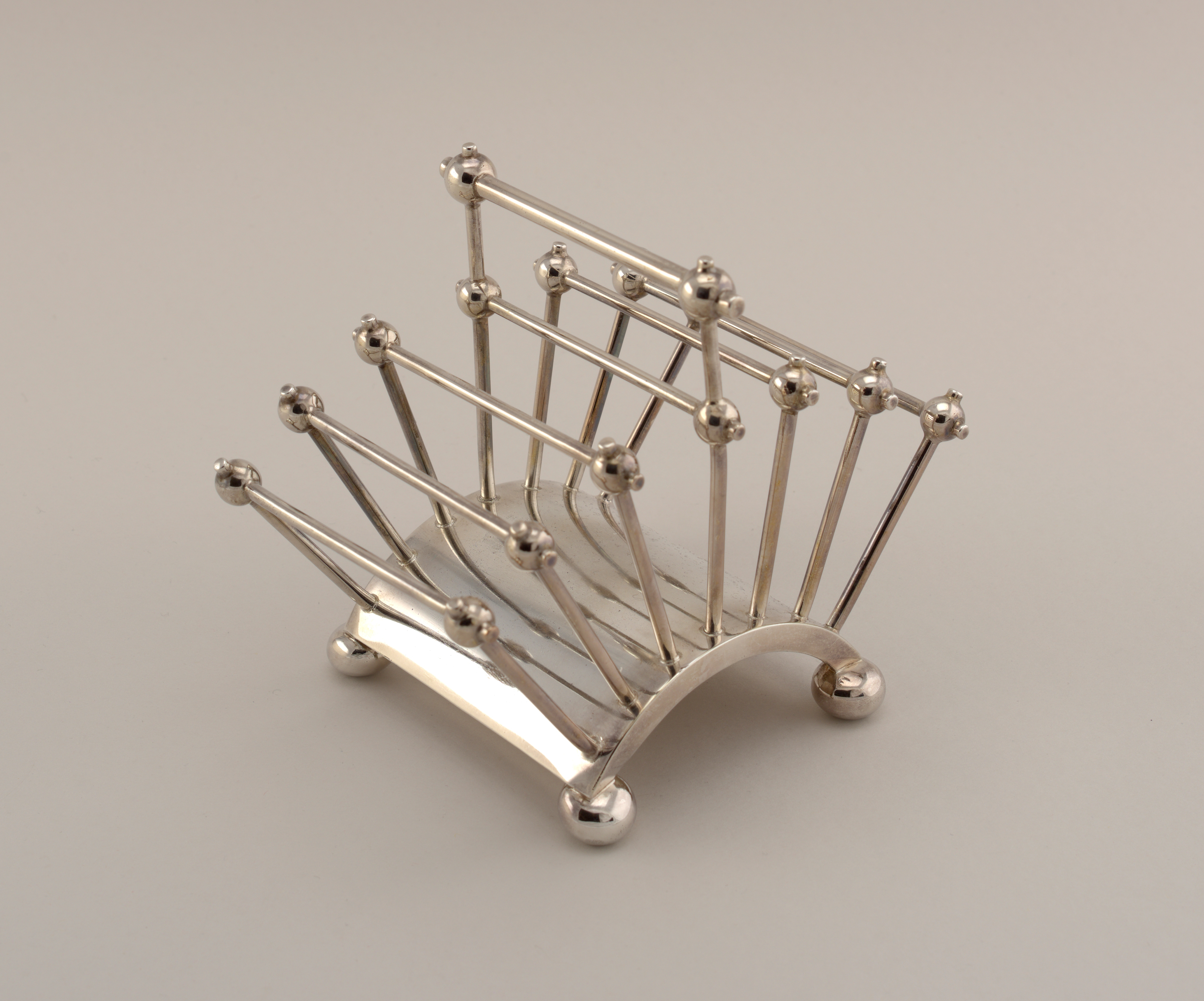
Toast Rack (1881)

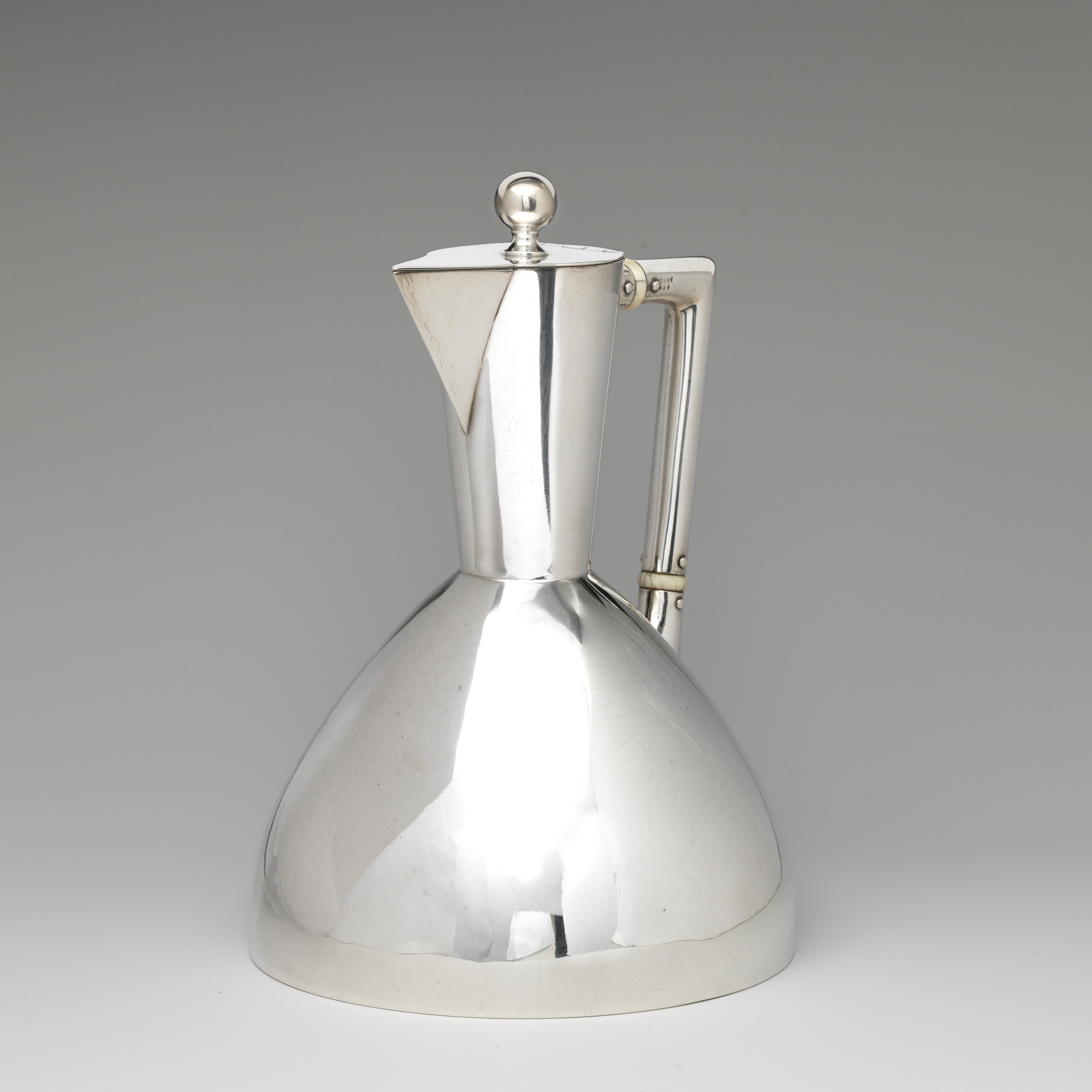
Pitcher (c. 1881)

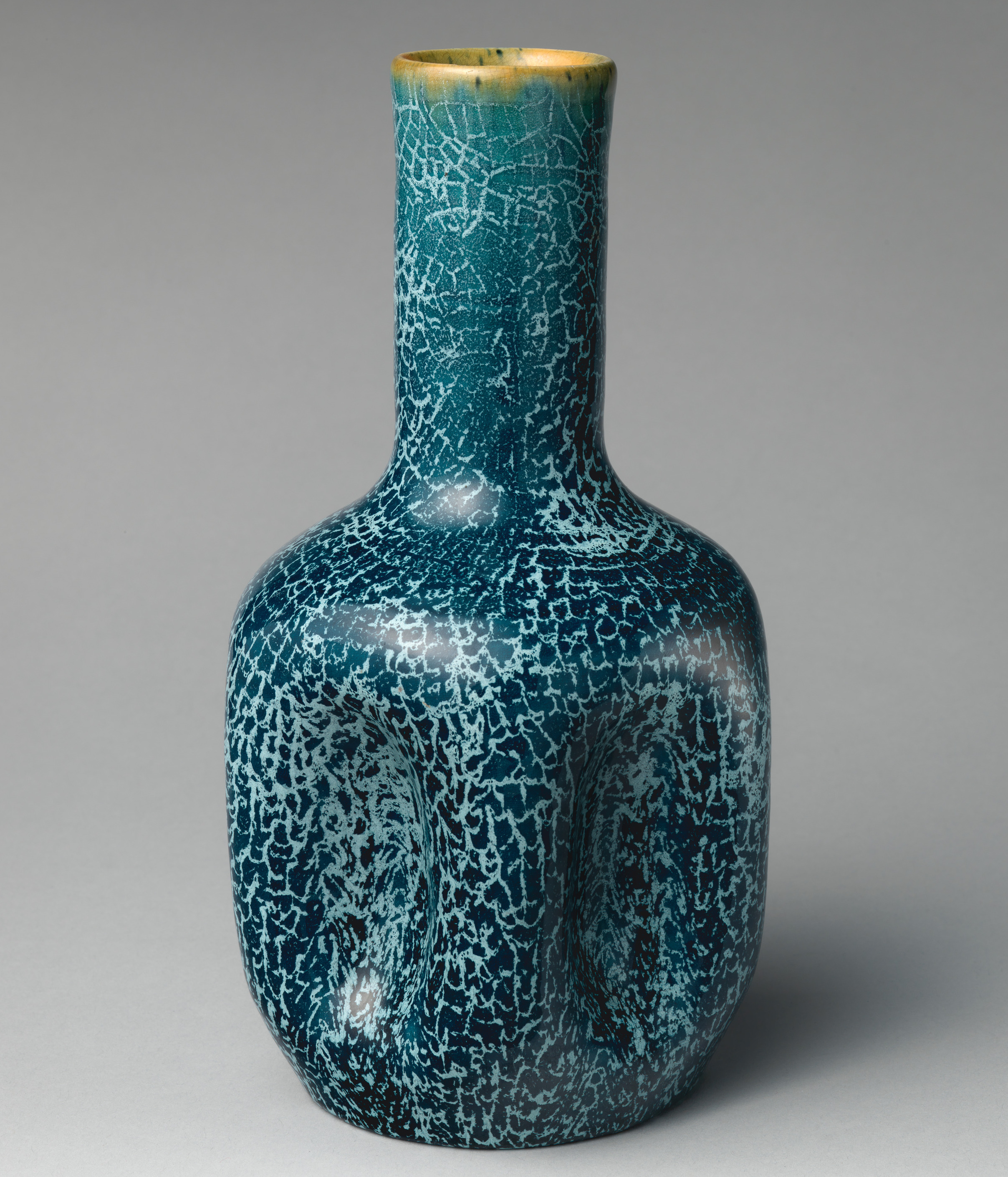
Bottle vase for Linthorpe Art Pottery (c. 1882)

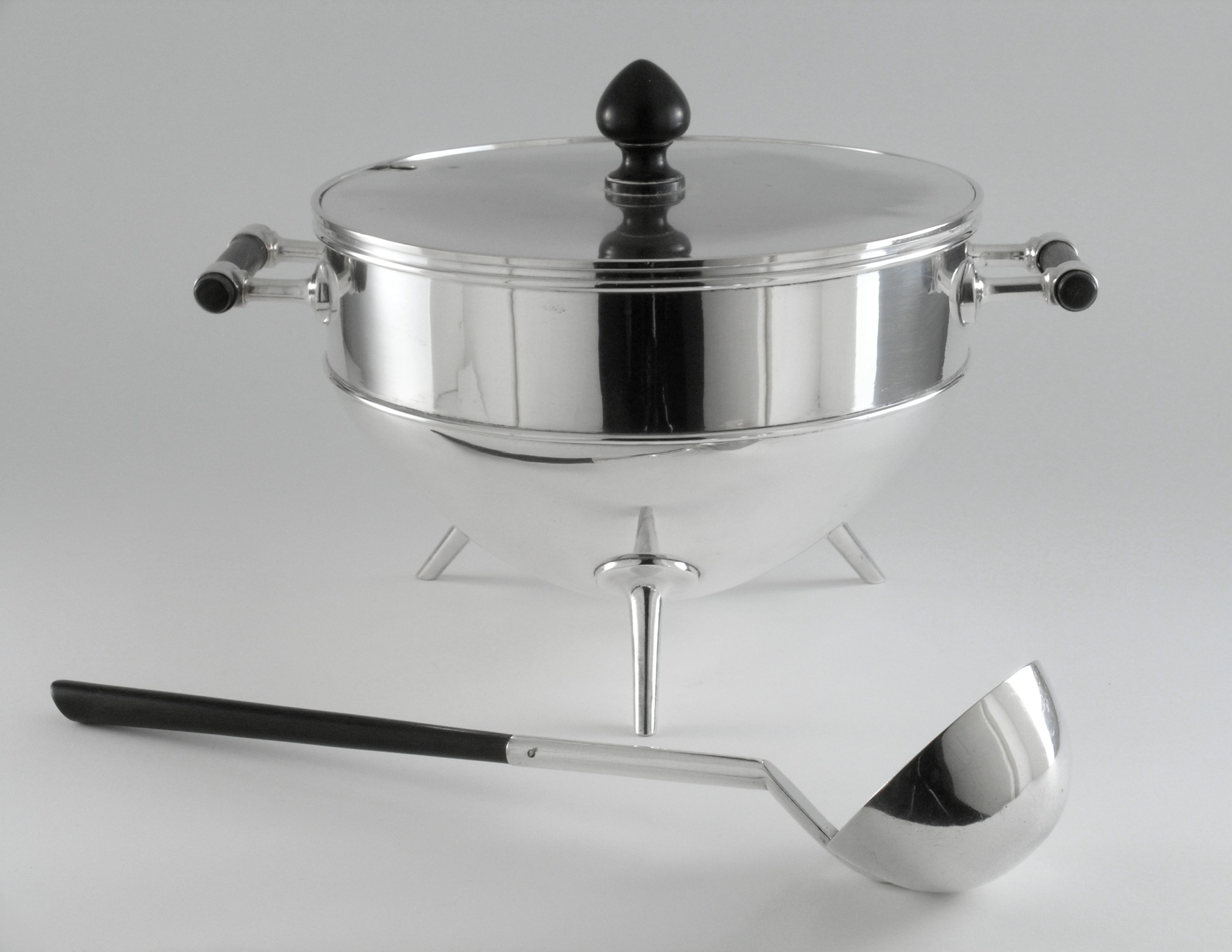
Soup tureen and ladle (1888)

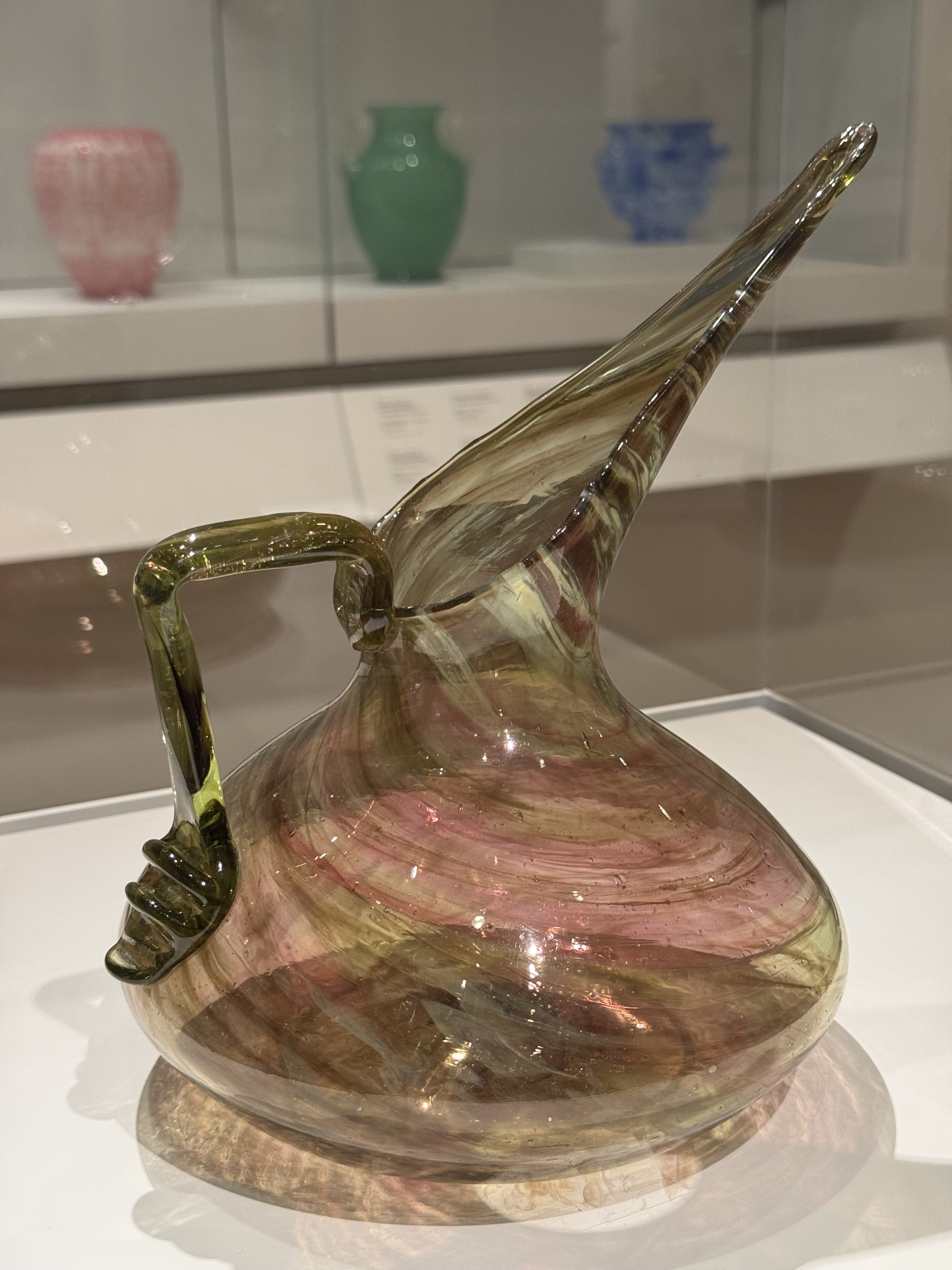
Clutha pitcher (c. 1895)

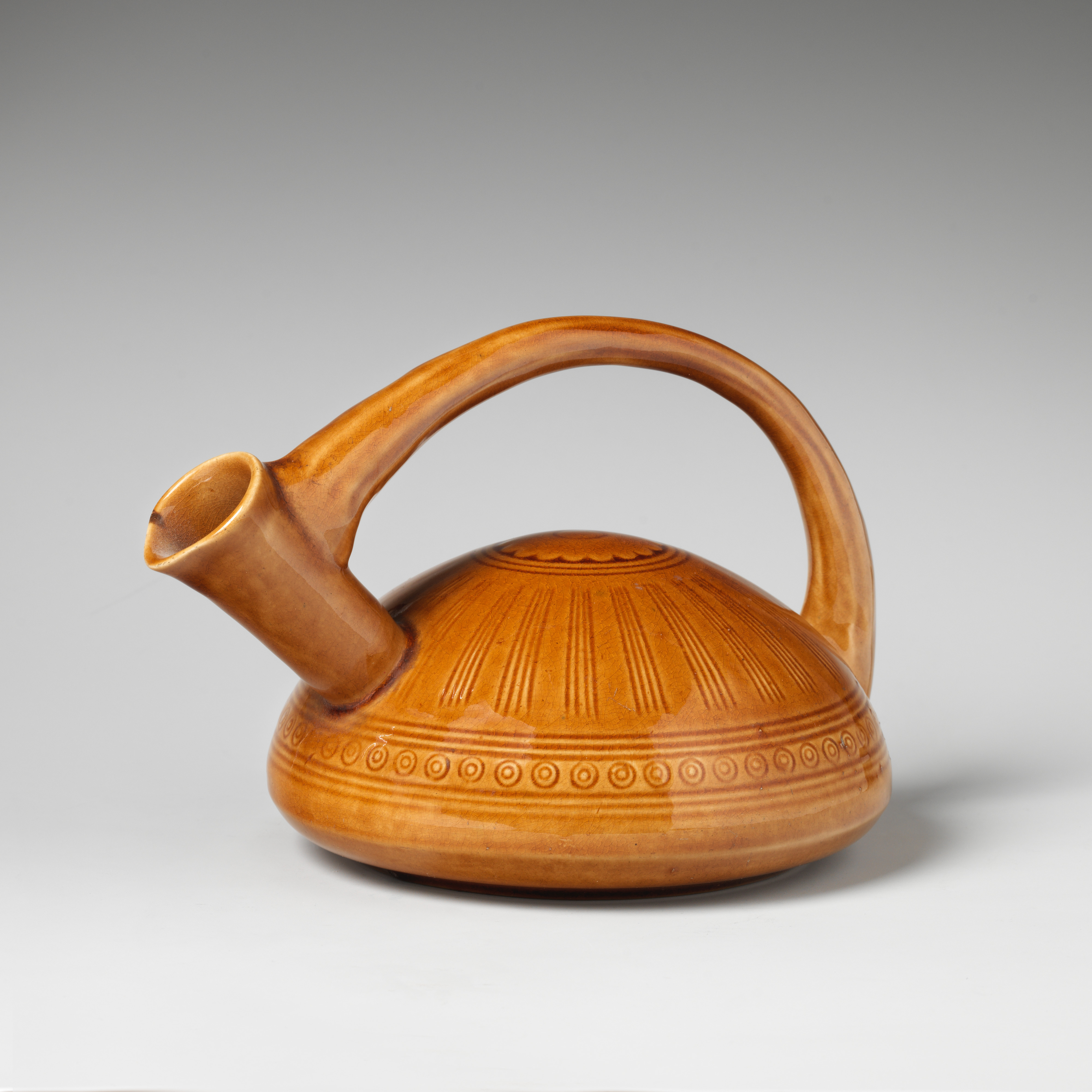
Pitcher

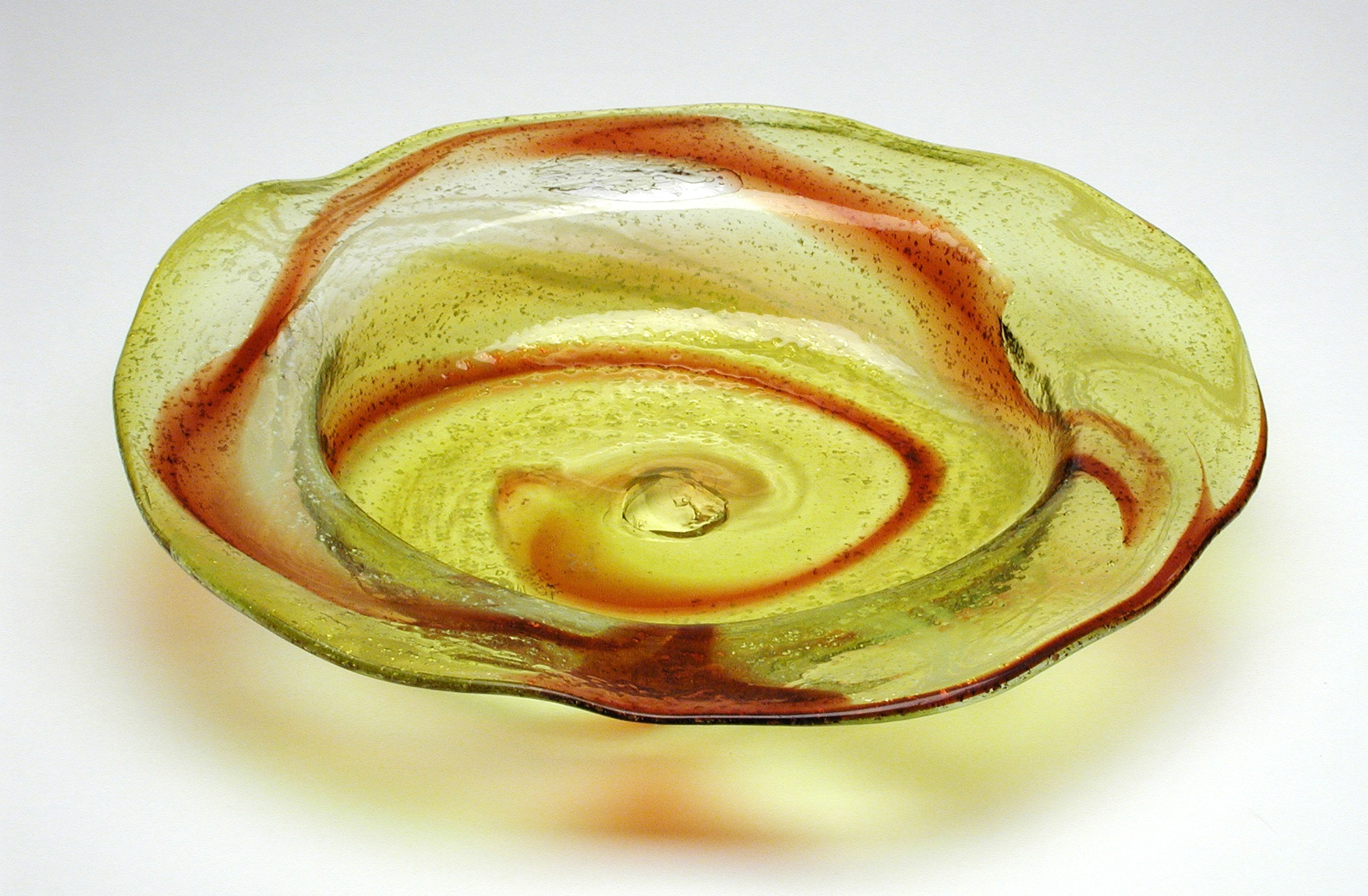
Glass dish for Couper & Sons

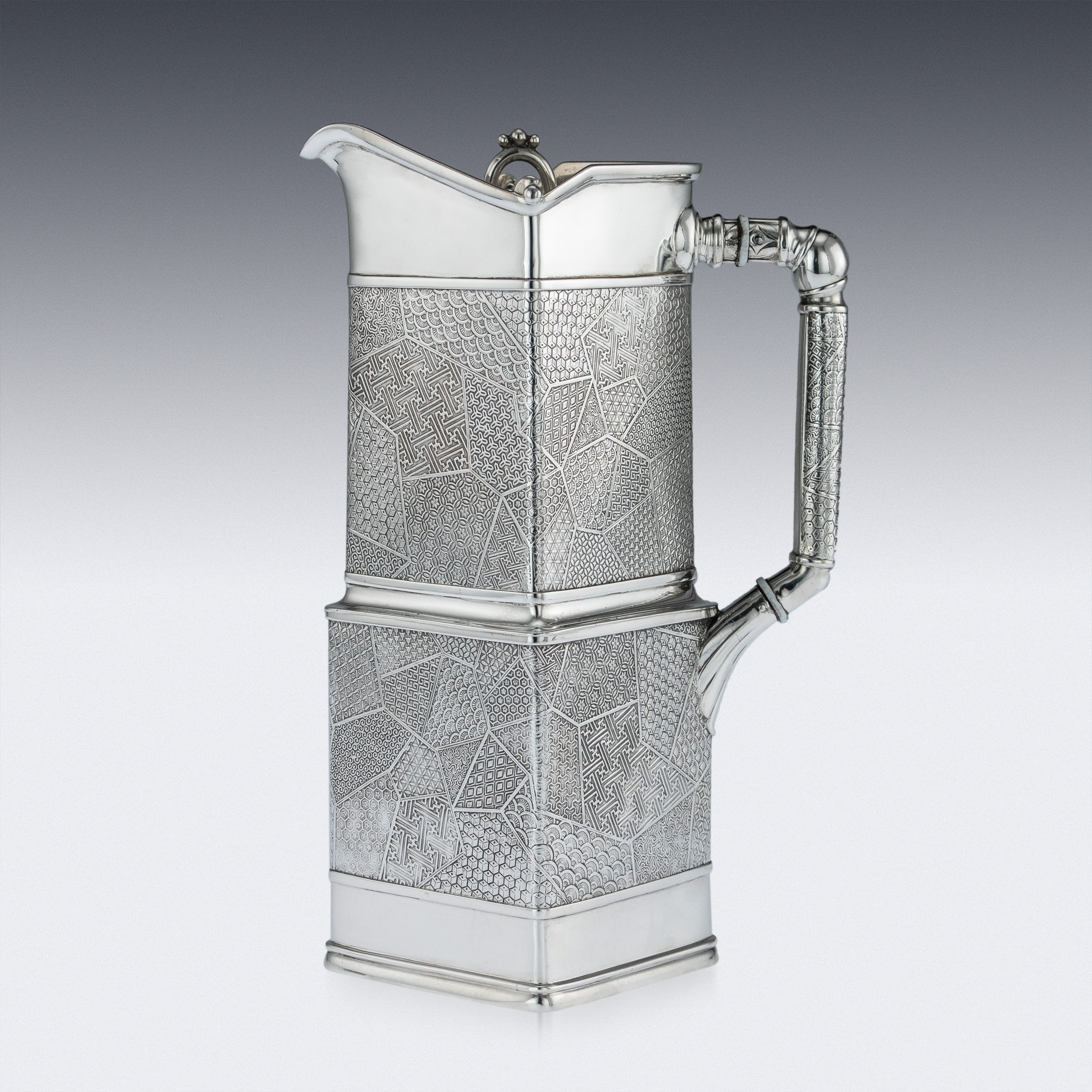
A 'Komai' pattern silver water jug

== Partial bibliography ==
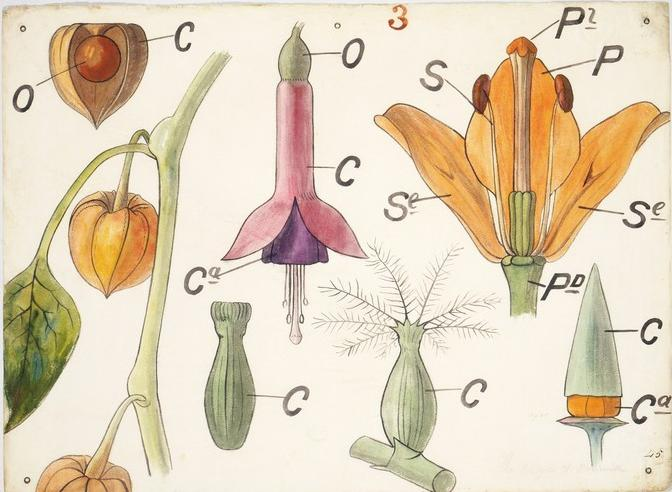
Botany diagram, about 1855, Christopher Dresser V&A Museum no. 3968

- Unity in Variety, as Deduced from the Vegetable Kingdom. London: James S. Virtue. 1860.
- The Rudiments of Botany, Structural and Physiological. London: James S. Virtue. 1859.
- Popular manual of Botany. 1860.
- The Art of Decorative Design. Day & Son. 1862.
- Development of Ornamental Art in the International Exhibition (1862)
- General Principles of Art, Decorative and Pictorial, with hints on colour, its harmonies and contrasts (1868)
- Principles of Decorative Design (1873)
- Studies in Design (1875)
- Japan, its Architecture, Art and Art-Manufactures (1882)
- Modern Ornamentation (1886)
