= Connecting Communities =

2009 report by the Association of Train Operating Companies

Connecting Communities: Expanding Access to the Rail Network is a 2009 report by the Association of Train Operating Companies (ATOC) identifying potential expansion of the National Rail passenger railway network in England, primarily through the construction or re-opening of railway lines for passenger services, and the construction or re-opening of up to 40 new passenger railway stations.

The report was published on 15 June 2009, and identified 14 commercially viable schemes involving new passenger lines, requiring the definite re-opening or construction of at least 30 new stations. These schemes would use a mixture of historically closed lines, recently closed or currently operating freight-only lines, or sharing heritage railway tracks with permission from their owners. The report also identified seven commercially viable sites for new Park and Ride stations (a.k.a. Parkway stations) to be built on existing lines. The report also identified seven potential new passenger 'link lines' on the existing rail network, opening up new passenger routes but without new stations.

The report covered relatively low cost, short term, localised schemes, with lead times from initiation to completion ranging from 2 years 9 months to 6 years, complementing larger schemes already in place for completion past 2014. For the schemes to reach completion, the proposals would need to be taken forward by the respective local and regional governments, Network Rail (the infrastructure owner) and the Department for Transport.

The schemes would complement development to the national rail network already undertaken since 1995, comprising the completion of 27 new lines (totalling 199 track miles) and 68 stations, with 65 new station sites identified by Network Rail or government for possible construction. However the great majority of these new lines and stations are in Scotland, Wales and London. The report examined schemes in England only, since rail development in Scotland and Wales was already being organised by Transport Scotland and the Welsh Assembly.

== Methodology ==
ATOC took a top down approach to the method of identifying possible sites for introducing new services and infrastructure, by first identifying areas and communities not well served by the current national network, and then comparing those with opportunities for development based on simple reinstatement or existing lines or the construction of relatively short new lines. This approach took into account the fact that many communities had grown in population since losing a previous service, and others had been entirely built without a rail connection.

Using demographic and industry data, ATOC compared the usage levels of passenger rail in other well-served areas of the country, and determined a baseline population figure of 15,000 (based on the 2001 census), above which level, communities were considered potential candidates for commercially viable new schemes.

These potential locations were then compared with a map of the lines and services that had been cut in the Beeching Axe of the 1960s, and beyond. This identified a candidate list of 75 possible communities, which were further reduced based on an analysis using passenger demand forecasting, local traffic congestion levels, local commuting patterns, the feasibility of any new rail route, the capital cost, and the proximity of existing rail access locations.

Many options were eliminated due to the loss of important permanent way features such as bridges, although many of the remaining proposals include construction of new level crossings and in at least one case the construction of a new bridge.

The 35 locations that remained after this analysis were then evaluated further against the use of possible new services by customers, taking into account for example factors such as local traffic congestion, to give a benefit-cost ratio (BCR) figure for each scheme, which determined whether these schemes would be included in the report as commercially viable in the opinion of ATOC.

== New rail and station schemes ==
Of the 35 schemes identified in the report Methodology, the final report detailed 14 schemes involving line and station development which had an indicated benefit-cost ratio (BCR) of greater than 1, when examined with proposed new passenger services, meaning that the possible new services would be commercially viable. The report summarised the remaining schemes analysed with a BCR of less than 1, on the basis that there could be a net benefit of the schemes when taking into account regeneration and expansion that would occur if the scheme was implemented.

Of the 14 schemes with a BCR above 1, six are on existing freight or heritage railway lines, three are on recently closed freight only lines and the remaining five use part of the permanent way of lines closed in the past. The heritage railways involved include the Paignton and Dartmouth Steam Railway and the East Lancashire Railway.

Eight of these 14 schemes involve the extension or diversion of existing passenger services. The remaining six would require new services to be integrated into the existing capacity on the main lines they connect to.

Three of the schemes also link currently separate parts of the network, Leicester – Burton, Washington (Leamside Line) and Brownhills (Walsall – Lichfield line), bringing possible additional benefits for freight traffic and provision of diversionary routes.

The 14 schemes with a BCR greater than 1 were as follows:

Scheme name	Proposed services	Estimated capital cost	Number of proposed stations	Proposed stations
Aldridge	Birmingham New Street – Walsall Sutton Park Line	6	1	Aldridge
Ashington and Blyth	Newcastle/MetroCentre – Ashington Blyth and Tyne Railway	34	3	Seaton Delaval (See Seaton Delaval); Bedlington (See Bedlington); Newsham (for Blyth); Ashington (original site or new location)
Bordon	Aldershot – Bordon Bordon Light Railway	50	1	Bordon (half mile closer to Bordon than the former Bordon station)
Brixham	To Exmouth to Churston (for Brixham) via Exeter Paignton and Dartmouth Steam Railway and Avocet Line	0	2	Goodrington Sands; Churston (for Brixham)
Brownhills	Walsall to Lichfield via Brownhills South Staffordshire Line	122	2	Pelsall; Brownhills
Cranleigh	Extension of London Waterloo – Guildford stopping service Cranleigh Line	63	2	Cranleigh; Bramley
Fleetwood	Preston – Fleetwood Fleetwood Branch Line	14	2	Thornton; Fleetwood
Hythe	Hythe to Southampton, Southampton Airport and Romsey Fawley Branch Line	3	1	Hythe (See Hythe, Hampshire)
Leicester – Burton	Leicester – Burton or Derby Leicester and Swannington Railway	49	6	Kirby Muxloe; Bagworth (see Bagworth); Coalville; Ashby de la Zouch; Moira (see Moira, Leicestershire); Gresley (for Swadlincote) (See Swadlincote)
Rawtenstall	Manchester Victoria to Rawtenstall via Heywood East Lancashire Railway	50	6	Heywood; Bury (Bolton Street); Summerseat; Ramsbottom; Irwell Vale; Rawtenstall
Ringwood	to London Waterloo or London Victoria	70	1	Ringwood
Skelmersdale	Ormskirk to Skelmersdale railway station via Skelmersdale Branch	31	1 (+1)	Skelmersdale; Westhead (possible, not evaluated)
Washington	Newcastle – Manchester Airport Leamside Line	86	1	Washington
Wisbech	Wisbech – March – Peterborough Wisbech and March Bramley Line	12	2	Wisbech Town (See Wisbech); Wisbech Parkway

Marked out for additional mention was the reopening of Portishead railway station on an existing freight route, where the BCR could be raised from 0.6 to above 1.0 if re-evaluated, due to high local population growth post-2001 and traffic congestion at Junction 19 of the M5 motorway.

== Proposed parkway stations ==
The report identified seven possible locations for new Park and Ride stations (a.k.a. Parkway stations) to be built on existing passenger lines, to serve communities with a population of 15,000 or more. These schemes all had benefit-cost ratios of over 1.7, up to 10.2. The locations are as follows:

Location	Line	Estimated capital cost
Rushden Parkway	Midland Main Line (on site of former Irchester railway station)	6
Horden / Peterlee (station opened in 2020)	Durham Coast Line (on site of former Easington station)	2
Kenilworth (station opened in 2018)	Coventry to Leamington line	4
Ilkeston (station opened in 2017)	Midland Main Line (on site of former Ilkeston Junction and Cossall railway station)	3
Clay Cross/North Wingfield Parkway (See Clay Cross and North Wingfield)	Erewash Valley Line	3
Ossett Parkway (See Ossett)	Huddersfield Line (within the Healey Mills rail yard site)	2
Wantage & Grove Parkway (See Wantage and Grove)	Great Western Main Line (See also the former Wantage Road railway station)	4

== List of proposed new stations ==
- Ashby de la Zouch
- Ashington
- Bagworth (See Bagworth)
- Bedlington (See Bedlington)
- Bordon (See Bordon)
- Bramley & Wonersh
- Brownhills
- Bury (Bolton Street)
- Coalville
- Churston (for Brixham)
- Clay Cross/North Wingfield Parkway (See Clay Cross and North Wingfield)
- Cranleigh
- Fleetwood
- Goodrington Sands
- Gresley (for Swadlincote) (See Swadlincote)
- Heywood
- Hythe (See Hythe, Hampshire)
- Ilkeston
- Irwell Vale
- Kenilworth
- Kirby Muxloe
- Moira (see Moira, Leicestershire)
- Newsham (for Blyth) (See Blyth)
- Ossett Parkway (See Ossett)
- Pelsall
- Peterlee Parkway (See Peterlee)
- Portishead
- Ramsbottom
- Rawtenstall
- Ringwood
- Rushden Parkway (See Rushden)
- Seaton Delaval (See Seaton Delaval)
- Skelmersdale
- Summerseat
- Thornton
- Wantage & Grove Parkway (See Wantage and Grove)
- Washington
- Westhead (possible addition to the Skelmersdale scheme)
- Wisbech Town (See Wisbech)
- Wisbech Parkway (See Wisbech)

== Potential link lines ==
The ATOC report also identified 16 potential 'link lines' on the existing rail network where new services could be run as part of National Rail services, but not with the primary purpose of opening new stations. These would bring the benefit of providing new journey opportunities for passengers, as well as more options for diversionary routes for traffic on the national network. None of these would provide new stations for populations over 15,000, and as such none of the link lines were evaluated for a specific benefit-cost ratio, but were evaluated as physically feasible. The links identified were as follows:

- Bishop Stortford – Braintree – Colchester
- Burscough Curves
- Chessington South – Leatherhead
- Glazebrook – Partington
- Lewes – Uckfield
- Matlock – Buxton
- March – Spalding
- Oxford – Bletchley with Manton curve
- Northampton – Bedford
- Rugby – Peterborough
- Skipton – Colne
- Stafford – Wellington
- Stourbridge – Walsall
- Whelley Lines
- Willingdon Chord, north of Eastbourne
- Woodhead line

== See also ==
- List of closed railway stations in Britain
- Rail transport in Great Britain
