= Ellistown =

Village in Leicestershire, England

Coordinates: 52.699°N 1.367°W

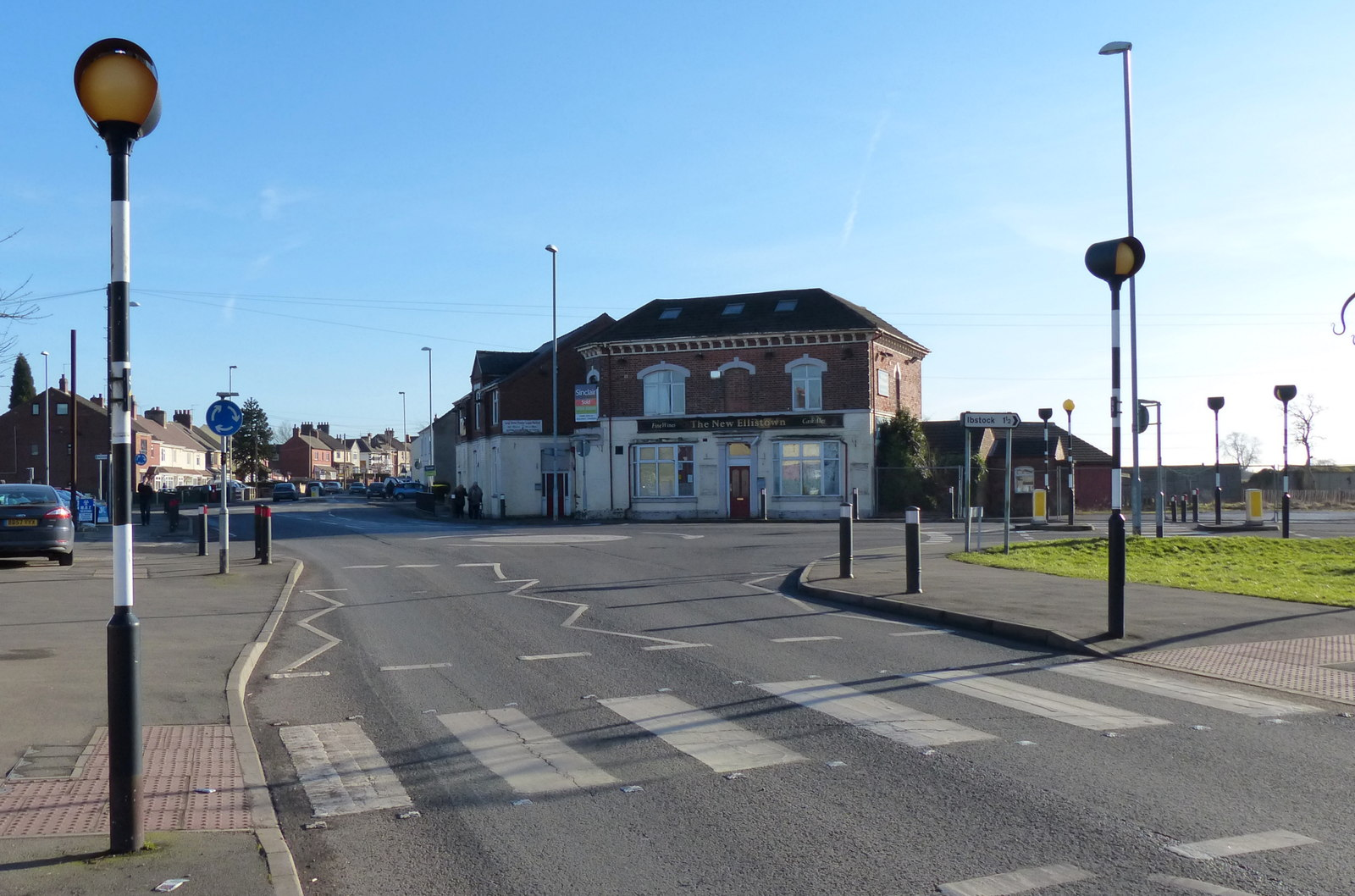
- Midland Road (2015)

- Location within Leicestershire
- Population: 2,106 (parish, 2001 census)
- OS grid reference: SK4211
- Civil parish: Ellistown and Battleflat
- District: North West Leicestershire
- Shire county: Leicestershire
- Region: East Midlands
- Country: England
- Sovereign state: United Kingdom
- Post town: Coalville
- Postcode district: LE67
- Dialling code: 01530
- Police: Leicestershire
- Fire: Leicestershire
- Ambulance: East Midlands
- UK Parliament: North West Leicestershire
- Website: Ellistown & Battleflat Parish Council

Ellistown is a village about 2 miles (3 km) south of Coalville in the North West Leicestershire district of Leicestershire, England. It is named after Colonel Joseph Joel Ellis who died in 1885. The village is in the civil parish of Ellistown and Battleflat.

The village has a community primary school, two village shops and a hairdressing salon. A working men's club, Ellistown F.C. football club and five play parks. Ellistown is just within the eastern boundary of the National Forest.

== History ==
Ellistown is named after Colonel Joseph Joel Ellis of London, but its history predates him. From the 14th century it was in the hundred of Sparkenhoe and parish of Ibstock. Ecclesiastically the area was part of the Anglican Diocese of Lincoln from the English Reformation until 1837 and then the Diocese of Peterborough until 1926, when it became part of the new Diocese of Leicester. The village was developed for coal mining from the Victorian era.

=== Mediaeval and early modern periods ===
Around 1140 Swinfen Grange was one of two granges given by nobleman Robert Byrton to the Abbot of Garendon Abbey which was near what is now Shepshed. Swinfen was where the Abbot's bailiff lived and was only a small mud and wattle built settlement with three strip fields surrounded by Charnwood Forest.

When the monasteries were dissolved for Henry VIII, Garendon Abbey surrendered its lands to the Crown which then sold or let them. Swinfen Grange was let to a John Pykeringe in 1531 for £7 per year. At this point the name seems to have changed to "Pykeringe Grange" after its first lay tenant, although there is some evidence that for some times the names Swinfen Grange and Pykeringe Grange may both have been used. The area that became Ellistown was called Swinfen Rushes at the start of the 19th century, while that now called Pickering Grange seemed to extend to the crossroads where the Hugglescote to Bagworth pony track crossed Beverley's Lane. The manorial history is shown in detail in John Nichols' History of the County of Leicester, Volume IV and by John Curtis 30 years later.

The site of the medieval grange house is almost 1 mile (1.6 km) south of Ellistown village. It was originally a moated manor house. The western part of the present Pickering Grange Farmhouse on the site is 17th century or earlier; the eastern part is a 19th-century addition.

=== 19th century – to 1880 ===
The pony trains appear to have demised around 1810 with the coming of the canals and railways in the area. The pony trains brought coal from Ibstock Colliery, turning at the crossroads towards Bagworth to avoid the turnpikes, and then on to Leicester via Aylestone. The Slip Inn on Whitehill Road near where the first pit was sunk was a favoured stopping point for the pony trains. John Curtis in his account of the county in 1831 mentions Pickering's Grange as a hamlet in the parish of Ibstock.

The Leicester and Swannington Railway opened in 1832. It passed less than 1 mile (1.6 km) east of Ellistown and its nearest station was at Bardon Hill just over a mile northeast of the village. The Midland Railway took over the line in 1845, and a few years later realigned the railway between Merry Lees and Bardon Hill to avoid the 1 in 29 Bagworth Incline. The new alignment was slightly west of the old route, and the Midland opened a new Bagworth and Ellistown railway station at Bagworth 1.5 miles (2.4 km) south of Ellistown. In 1849 the Midland opened an extension from Coalville Town to Burton-on-Trent, which made the line through Bagworth and Ellistown part of its Leicester to Burton upon Trent Line.

In 1873 the Ashby and Nuneaton Joint Railway opened. It had a branch from Shackerstone through Hugglescote to Coalville Town, and Hugglescote railway station was only 0.5 miles (800 m) north of the centre of Ellistown. Just to the north of Hugglescote a junction was added in 1883, when the Charnwood Forest Railway opened from here to Loughborough Derby Road. Also directly to the north of Hugglescote station a branch ran into South Leicester Colliery.

On their arrival the Ellis family took over the Inn converting it into their servants' quarters and adding accommodation for themselves as well as stables and a carriage house. Around here was very little in the way of buildings at this time: Johnny Battram's cottage, two farms along Whitehill Lane and the railway spur that served Ibstock Colliery.

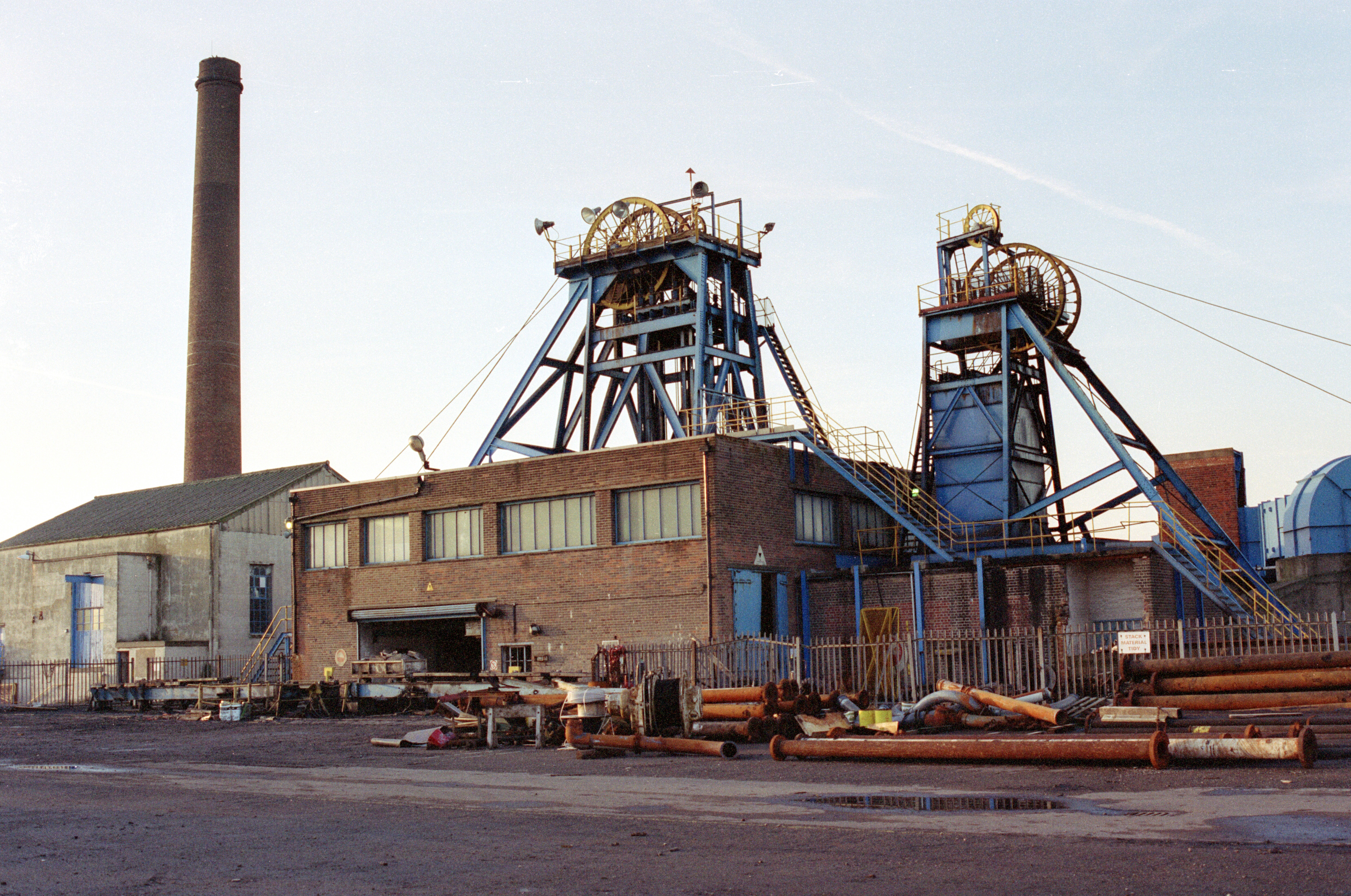
Ellistown Colliery, Leicestershire, 13th January 1990.

South Leicestershire Colliery Pit Wheel

Ellistown Colliery was sunk in 1873 and two years later was producing coal. It had a rail link to the Leicester to Burton upon Trent Line. Colonel Ellis had two terraces of houses built on either side of the Bagworth to Hugglescote road to house employees and this was the beginning of modern Ellistown. All but one of these terraces have now been demolished. Towards the end of their history Ellistown West Terraces had a great deal of iron banding and brick supports attached to them to resist the effect of mining subsidence that prevails in this area.

The South Leicestershire Coal Company opened its colliery in 1874 northeast of the crossroads. Like Ellis it built terraces for its workers on the lane leading to it, South Street. The colliery was linked to the Ashby and Nuneaton Joint Railway.

=== 19th and 20th centuries – 1881 and after ===
Local brick

In 1881 the Church of England built a day school which also served as a mission church. The Church of England parish church of Saint Christopher was built in 1895–96 from local brick, with Gothic Revival windows in a Perpendicular style. The foundation stone was laid in October 1895 by the wife of Mandell Creighton, Bishop of Peterborough, and the Bishop consecrated the church on 25 April 1896. It was built of Ellistown Red Tapped bricks from the Ellistown Brick and Pipe Company. The Rev. Mr. Terry was made the first vicar of the Parish. In 1911 a vicarage was built next to the church for the Rev. Mr. Boothby: before this Broughton Villa on Whitehill Road served as the vicarage. St. Christopher's is now part of a combined benefice with the parishes of Hugglescote and Snibston.

At the same time the Methodists were having a chapel built by the original Ellistown Terraces and the Wesleyans had theirs built opposite what came to be known as White Hill Farm. Both of these chapels have since been demolished, the Wesleyan Chapel was replaced by newer housing.

The New Ellistown Hotel

The New Ellistown Hotel was formerly the South Leicester Hotel. It stands on the land of the original White Hill Farm. Deeds for White Hill Farm from 1784 show the farm's site running from the crossroads along Ibstock Road to the end of the present village. The pub closed in 2010's and remained shut for some time before being transformed into a mini market shop around 2017.

Kendal Road

The first private houses on White Hill Road were built in 1877. Both pits prospered and Ibstock and Midland Roads were developed for more housing. The terraces on Kendal and Cumberland Roads were built 1895–1900. Once White Hill Road had been developed the two separate areas of White Hill and Ellistown became one, and this was called Ellistown.

After Colonel Ellis died, the colliery, brickworks and estate were carried on by trustees under Orders of the Court of Chancery until 1936. In 1936 the colliery and brickworks were separated into two companies. Ellistown Brick and Pipe Company closed before the Second World War. Colonel Ellis was not a member of the prominent Ellis family of Leicester, and there has been confusion about this.

The London, Midland and Scottish Railway absorbed all the local railways in the 1923 grouping. In 1931 the LMS withdrew passenger services from the Ashby and Nuneaton and Charnwood Forest lines and closed Hugglescote station. Nationalisation in 1948 made the lines part of British Railways, which withdrew freight services from the Charnwood Forest line in 1963 and from the Ashby and Nuneaton line in 1971. In 1964 BR withdrew passenger services from the Leicester to Burton line and closed Bagworth and Ellistown station.

Around 1975 BR realigned the Ashby and Nuneaton trackbed; from running through the former Hugglescote station to having the embankment to the north of rebuilt to run into the South Leicestershire Colliery only to serve the Coalfield Farm rapid loader facility. This was fed from the Sence Valley opencast colliery via a conveyor belt system. Trains could access the facility from Coalville Junction. Coalfields Farm closed in the mid-1990s.

Most British collieries were nationalised in 1947. On 16 May 1952 a notice of a meeting for the winding up of the Ellistown Colliery Company Limited was published. The site is now a factory making concrete pipes. The South Leicestershire Colliery closed in 1989, the site of the colliery is now a small industrial estate.

Between late 1999 to mid-2012 Ellistown expanded significantly with the addition of new housing estates on its eastern side between Whitehill Road and Beveridge Lane. Recently the parish council has introduced a gala day that is held every August on South Street park.

== Sources ==
- Scott, John E. (1982). Ellistown from 1140 to 1982: the Story of 'The Town That Ellis Built'. Ellistown: St Christopher's parish church.
