= Kirby Muxloe railway station =

Former railway station in Leicestershire, England

Kirby Muxloe
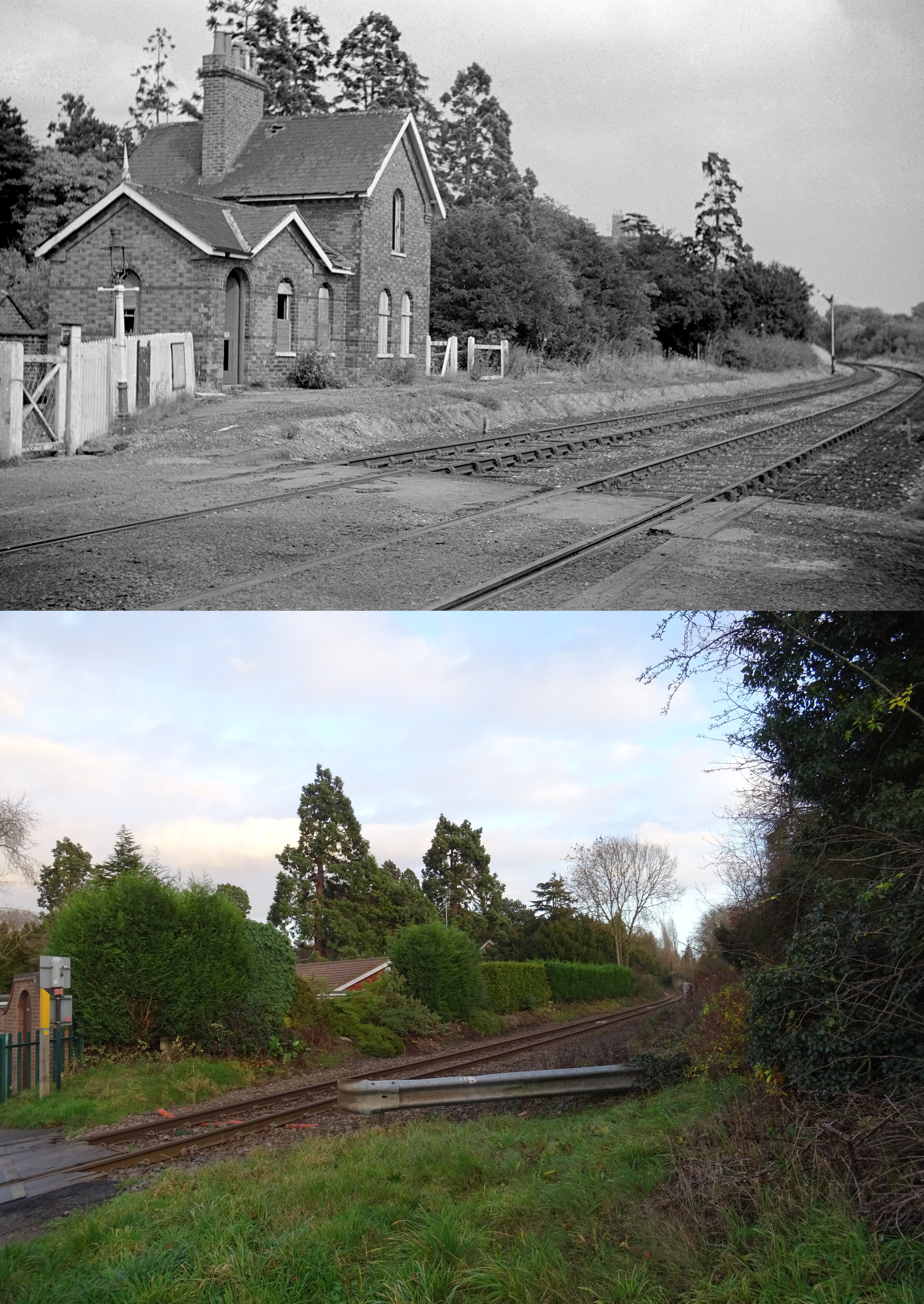
- Kirby Muxloe station in 1967, after closure, and in 2018

General information
- Location: Kirby Muxloe, Blaby; England
- Coordinates: 52.627°N 1.232°W
- Grid reference: SK521035

Other information
- Status: Disused

History
- Pre-grouping: Midland Railway
- Post-grouping: London, Midland and Scottish Railway

Key dates
- 1859: opened
- 1964: closed
Location

Kirby Muxloe railway station was a station on the Midland Railway line between Leicester and Desford that bypassed part of the Leicester and Swannington Railway in Leicestershire, England.

The Midland opened line through Kirby Muxloe in 1849, though Kirby Muxloe station did not open until 1859. The following year the Midland opened its line from Coalville Town to Burton-on-Trent, making the line through Kirby Muxloe part of its through route between Leicester and Burton-on-Trent.

British Railways closed Kirby Muxloe station in 1964. It was one of numerous railway stations closed at that time that Flanders and Swann included in their song Slow Train released that year.

In the 1990s BR planned to restore passenger services between Leicester and Burton as the second phase of its Ivanhoe Line project. However, after the privatisation of British Rail in 1995 this phase of the project was discontinued. In 2009 the Association of Train Operating Companies published a £49 million proposal (Connecting Communities: Expanding Access to the Rail Network) to restore passenger services to the line that would include reopening a station at Kirby Muxloe.

Preceding station	Historical railways	Following station
Leicester	Midland Railway; Leicester to Burton upon Trent Line	Desford; Line open, station closed
