= Ashby de la Zouch railway station =

Former railway station in Leicestershire, England

Ashby de la Zouch
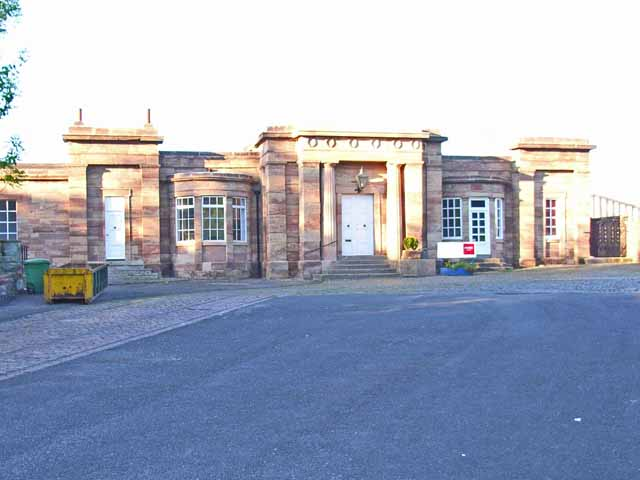
- The station building in 2006

General information
- Location: Ashby de la Zouch, North West Leicestershire; England
- Coordinates: 52.7429°N 1.4748°W
- Grid reference: SK355162
- Platforms: 2

Other information
- Status: Disused

History
- Original company: Midland Railway
- Pre-grouping: Midland Railway
- Post-grouping: London Midland and Scottish Railway

Key dates
- 1 August 1849: Station opened as Ashby
- 7 September 1964: Station closed
Location

Ashby de la Zouch railway station is a former railway station at Ashby de la Zouch in Leicestershire on the Leicester to Burton upon Trent Line. The Midland Railway opened it in 1849 and British Railways closed it in 1964.

The station is a small Neoclassical building, with side pavilions and Doric columns in keeping with the nearby Royal Hotel of 1826. It is a Grade II* listed building.

== History ==
The Midland Railway opened the station on 1 August 1849 as part of its new line between Swannington and Burton-on-Trent. The station was built partly on the remains of the horse-drawn Ticknall Tramway, which previously connected Ticknall lime quarries with the Ashby Canal.

In 1874 the Midland extended its Derby to Melbourne line to Ashby de la Zouch, partly using the route of the former Ticknall Tramway. The junction with the Leicester to Burton-on-Trent line was just west of Ashby station, so for a time the branch was served by a separate station a short distance from the 1849 building.

Ashby station forecourt was also a terminus for the 3 ft 6 in (1,067 mm) gauge Burton and Ashby Light Railway, a tramway between Ashby and Burton upon Trent, built by the MR and closed on 19 February 1927. Tram lines for the Burton and Ashby Light Railway are still visible in the forecourt.

The line became part of the London, Midland and Scottish Railway under the Grouping of 1923. In the nationalisation of transport in Britain in 1948 the line passed to the London Midland Region of British Railways. British Railways withdrew passenger services and closed Ashby station on 7 September 1964. The line continues to be used by freight services.

== Reopening proposals ==
In the 1990s BR planned to restore passenger services between Leicester and Burton as the second phase of its Ivanhoe Line project. However, after the privatisation of British Rail in 1995 this phase of the project was discontinued. In 2009 the Association of Train Operating Companies published a £49 million proposal to restore passenger services to the line that would include reopening a station at Ashby.

In 2018 the Campaign for the Reopening of the Ivanhoe Line (CRIL) – a community voluntary action group – was set up with the aim of restoring passenger services to the Burton to Leicester railway line. Although CRIL's aims include a station at Ashby, its exact location has not yet been defined, as the Ashby station building is now privately owned.

Preceding station	Historical railways	Following station
Swannington; Line open, station closed	Midland Railway; Leicester to Burton upon Trent Line	Moira; Line open, station closed
Worthington; Line closed, station closed	Midland Railway; Melbourne Line	Moira; Line open, station closed
