= Swannington railway station =

Former railway station in Leicestershire, England

Swannington

General information
- Location: Swannington, North West Leicestershire; England
- Coordinates: 52.736°N 1.394°W
- Grid reference: SK410155
- Platforms: 2

Other information
- Status: Disused

History
- Original company: Leicester and Swannington Railway
- Pre-grouping: Midland Railway
- Post-grouping: London, Midland and Scottish Railway

Key dates
- 1832: Leicester and Swannington Railway opened
- 1848: Burton-on-Trent line opened; second Swannington station replaces original terminus
- 18 June 1951: Station closed
Location

Swannington railway station was a railway station at Swannington in North West Leicestershire, England.

Swannington has had two railway stations. The first opened in 1833 as the western terminus of the Leicester and Swannington Railway. Trains reached it via the Swannington Incline, which had a 1 in 17 gradient and was worked by a stationary engine.

The Midland Railway took over the line in 1845 and extended it westwards to Burton-on-Trent in 1848, creating the Leicester to Burton upon Trent Line. The extension avoided the Swannington Incline by taking a new alignment beginning from a junction east of Swannington near Coalville Town. The new line passed south of the original terminus and a new Swannington station was opened on it on 1 September 1849, leaving the original Swannington terminus to remain as a goods depot.

The second Swannington station was closed on 18 June 1951, but the line remains open for freight traffic.

Preceding station	Historical railways	Following station
Coalville Town; Line open, station closed	Midland Railway; Leicester to Burton upon Trent Line	Ashby de la Zouch; Line open, station closed

== Bibliography ==
- Quick, Michael (2023). Railway Passenger Stations in Great Britain: A Chronology (PDF) (5th ed.). London: Railway and Canal Historical Society.
