= Bagworth and Ellistown railway station =

Former railway station in Leicestershire, England

Bagworth and Ellistown
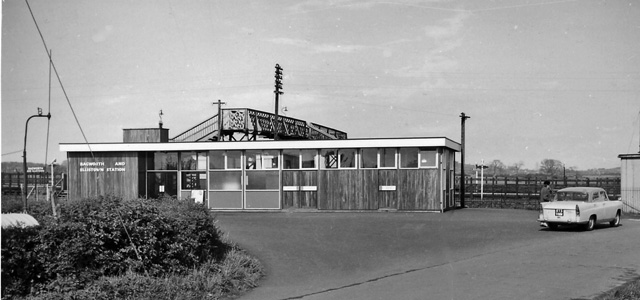
- Station exterior (down side) in April 1961

General information
- Location: Bagworth, Hinckley and Bosworth; England
- Coordinates: 52.680°N 1.347°W
- Grid reference: SK442092

Other information
- Status: Disused

History
- Pre-grouping: Midland Railway
- Post-grouping: London, Midland and Scottish Railway

Key dates
- 18 July 1832: First Bagworth station opened
- 1 August 1849: Second Bagworth station opened
- 1 October 1894: Station renamed Bagworth and Ellistown
- 7 September 1964: Station closed
Location

Bagworth and Ellistown was a railway station on the Leicester to Burton upon Trent Line, that served the villages of Bagworth and Ellistown in Leicestershire. It was opened by the Midland Railway in 1849 and closed by British Railways in 1964. It was at Bagworth on what is now the B585 road.

== History ==
The Leicester and Swannington Railway had previously opened a Bagworth station in 1832. The Midland Railway took over the line in 1845 and made a number of improvements, including replacing the original Bagworth station with a new one on 1 August 1849. The Ellis family created the colliery and village of Ellistown in 1873 and the Midland renamed the station Bagworth and Ellistown on 1 October 1894.

The Midland Railway became part of the London, Midland and Scottish Railway under the Grouping of 1923. The Leicester to Burton line became part of the London Midland Region of British Railways under the transport nationalisation of 1948. British Railways closed the station to passenger traffic on 7 September 1964.

== Reopening proposals ==
In the 1990s BR planned to restore passenger services to the Leicester to Burton upon Trent Line as the second phase of its Ivanhoe Line project. However, after the privatisation of British Rail in 1995 this phase of the project was discontinued. In 2009 the Association of Train Operating Companies published a £49 million proposal (Connecting Communities: Expanding Access to the Rail Network) to restore passenger services to the line that would include reopening a station at Bagworth.

Preceding station	Historical railways	Following station
Thornton Lane; Line open, station closed	Midland Railway; Leicester to Burton upon Trent Line	Bardon Hill; Line open, station closed
