= Newtown Unthank =

Hamlet in Leicestershire, England

Coordinates: 52.634°N 01.280°W

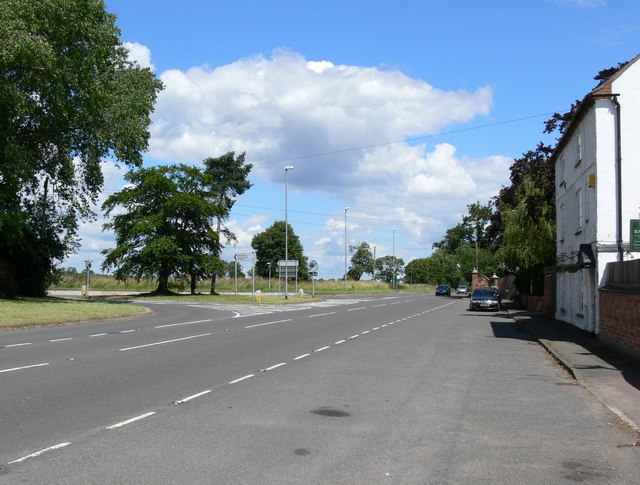
- Desford Lane, Newtown Unthank

- Location within Leicestershire
- OS grid reference: SK488043
- Civil parish: Desford
- District: Hinckley and Bosworth
- Shire county: Leicestershire
- Region: East Midlands
- Country: England
- Sovereign state: United Kingdom
- Post town: Leicester
- Postcode district: LE9
- Dialling code: 01455
- Police: Leicestershire
- Fire: Leicestershire
- Ambulance: East Midlands
- UK Parliament: Hinckley and Bosworth
- Website: Desford parish council

Newtown Unthank is a hamlet in the Hinckley and Bosworth district of Leicestershire about 6 miles (10 km) west of Leicester. It is in the civil parish of Desford and about a mile northeast of the village.

Newtown Unthank was the site of Desford railway station on the Leicester and Swannington Railway, which became part of the Leicester to Burton-upon-Trent Line. The station was closed in the 20th century; the railway between Leicester and Burton-upon-Trent remains open for freight trains.
