= Ivanhoe line =

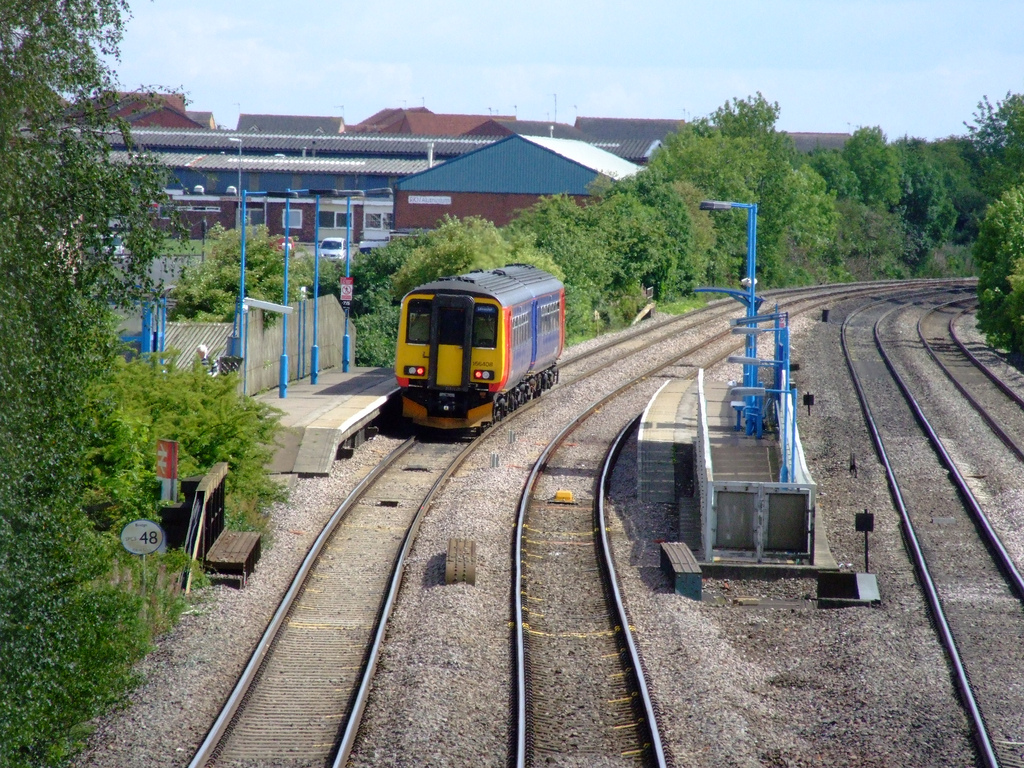
- A Class 156 Sprinter at Sileby station

Overview
- Status: Partially Operational
- Owner: Network Rail
- Locale: East Midlands
- Termini: Loughborough; Burton upon Trent

Service
- Type: Heavy rail
- System: National Rail
- Services: Leicester-Nottingham stopping service
- Operator: East Midlands Railway
- Rolling stock: Class 158 "Express Sprinter"; Class 170 "Turbostar"

History
- Closed: 1964
- Reopened: 1994 (Partial - Leicester to Loughborough)

Technical
- Number of tracks: 2–4
- Track gauge: 4 ft 8 1/2 in (1,435 mm) standard gauge
- Operating speed: less than 75mph

The Ivanhoe line is a railway line and proposed passenger service in the East Midlands, running from Loughborough in Leicestershire to Burton-on-Trent in Staffordshire. Passenger services on the Leicester-Burton upon Trent line were withdrawn in 1964 as part of the Beeching cuts, and various plans to reopen the line to passengers have been proposed since the early 1990s. To date, only a local East Midlands Railway stopper service has resumed between Leicester and Loughborough as phase 1 of the project/reopening, with the rest of the line remaining closed to passenger traffic and the second phase remaining uncompleted.

== History & Partial Reopening ==
The proposed Ivanhoe line follows the route of the Leicester-Burton upon Trent line, on which the passenger service was withdrawn on 7 September 1964.

The first phase of the reopening, which was branded as the 'Ivanhoe line' was proposed in the early 1990s, and involved the reopening of three stations between Leicester and Loughborough on the slow lines of the Midland Main Line. These three stations are:

- Syston
- Sileby
- Barrow-upon-Soar

which all opened and had passenger service restored in May 1994.

Barrow and Sileby each have two platforms (with limited access for disabled passengers), but Syston has a single platform serving both directions.

After this initial phase of the Ivanhoe line was completed, it was originally planned that phase two would extend the line west to Burton-on-Trent on the freight-only Leicester and Swannington Railway via Coalville Town and Ashby-de-la-Zouch. In 2006 the Conservative Party released a proposal for reopening the line. However the extension never began construction. One station on the Derby–Birmingham main line, Willington, past the western (Burton) end of the route, was constructed in the mid 1990s with Ivanhoe branding and blue livery. However, as a result of the failure of the Burton upon Trent–Leicester reopening, it remains isolated from the Ivanhoe line.

In June 2005 the Leicester-Loughborough passenger service was withdrawn due to service changes, with service at the three reopened stations now being incorporated into the Leicester-Nottingham-Lincoln service.

== Proposed Further Service ==
In June 2009 the Association of Train Operating Companies recommended reopening of the line to passenger services with stations at Kirby Muxloe, Bagworth, Coalville, Ashby-de-la-Zouch, Moira and Gresley. ATOC estimated that the capital cost at £49 million, the benefit-cost ratio (BCR) to be 1.3 and the BCR excluding capital costs to be 2.9. Leicestershire County Council again ruled out the proposal, claiming it would cost a £4 million annual subsidy. Previous reports had suggested the subsidy required would be far less, and that after the initial investment the line would make money.

East Midlands Parkway railway station has now been built on the route. The Borough of Charnwood's local plan of 2004 anticipates a station at Thurmaston.

In 2022 the closed section of the line was one of nine schemes chosen to undergo a feasibility scrutiny by Network Rail as part of the government's Restoring Your Railway programme. If approved, work could start in 2024 and the line reopened in 2026.

On 4 October 2023, the government included reopening the line as part of its Network North scheme. However, in April 2026, news emerged that the western section of the line between Mantle Lane in Coalville and Burton upon Trent is set to be mothballed.

In February 2026 a Reform UK councillor and cabinet member for highways, transport and waste at Leicestershire County Council described the bid to fully reopen the line as "dead".
