= Donisthorpe railway station =

Former railway station in Leicestershire, England

Donisthorpe
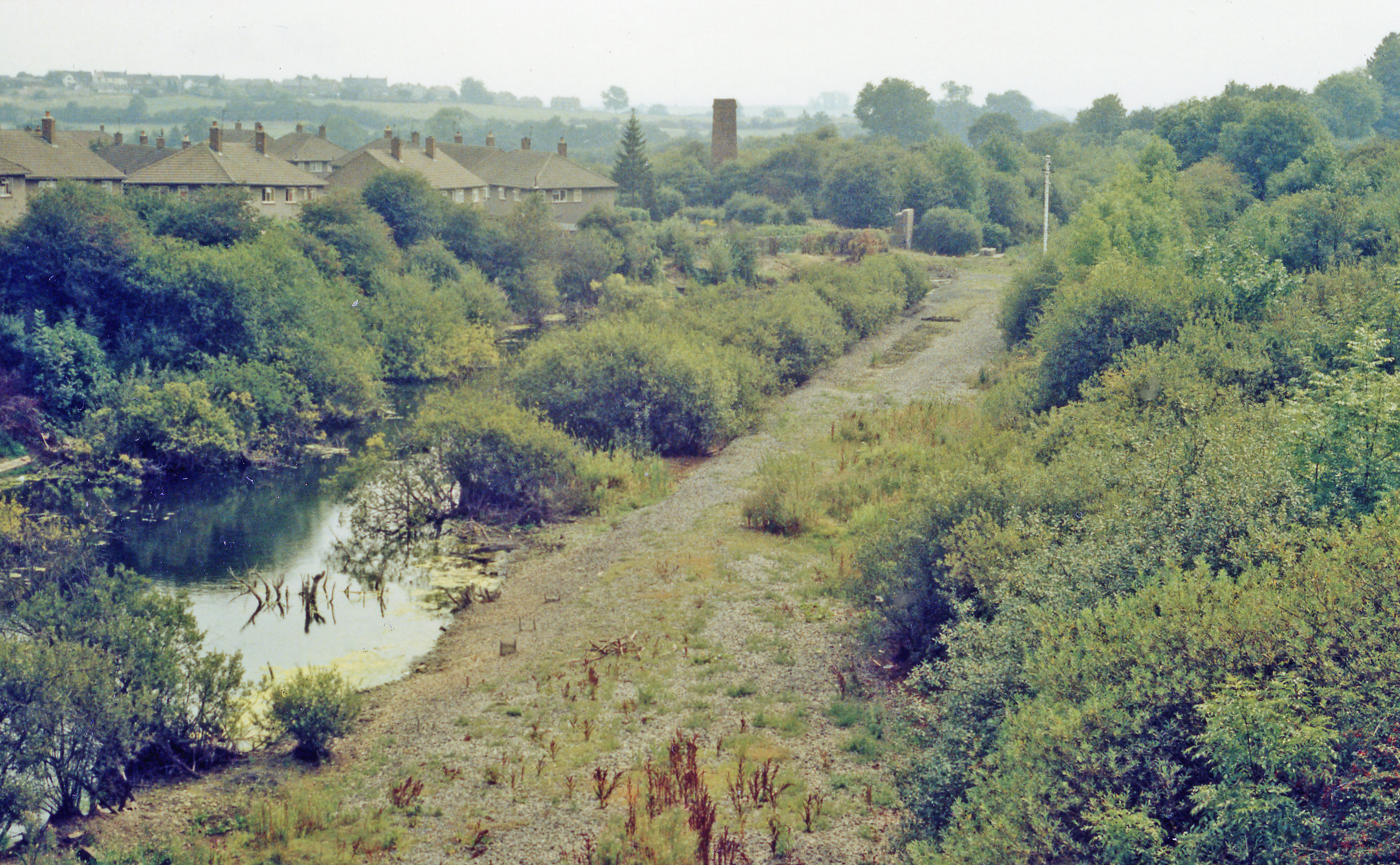
- Site of Donisthorpe station.

General information
- Location: Donisthorpe, North West Leicestershire; England
- Coordinates: 52.7223°N 1.5337°W
- Platforms: 2

Other information
- Status: Disused

History
- Original company: Ashby and Nuneaton Joint Railway
- Pre-grouping: Ashby and Nuneaton Joint Railway
- Post-grouping: London Midland and Scottish Railway

Key dates
- 1 May 1874: Station opened
- 13 April 1931: Station closed to passengers
- 6 July 1964: Station closed to goods
- 20 June 1981: Branch to Donisthorpe Colliery closed
Location

Donisthorpe railway station is a disused railway station that formerly served the village of Donisthorpe, North West Leicestershire, from 1874 to 1931. The station was on the Ashby and Nuneaton Joint Railway. The site has since been filled in and is now a footpath to Measham and Moira. The only trace of the former railway is the footpath to Measham.

Preceding station	Historical railways	Following station
Gresley; Line and station closed	Midland Railway, London and North Western Railway; Ashby and Nuneaton Joint Railway	Measham; Line and station closed
Moira; Line and station closed	Midland Railway, London and North Western Railway; Ashby and Nuneaton Joint Railway	Measham; Line and station closed

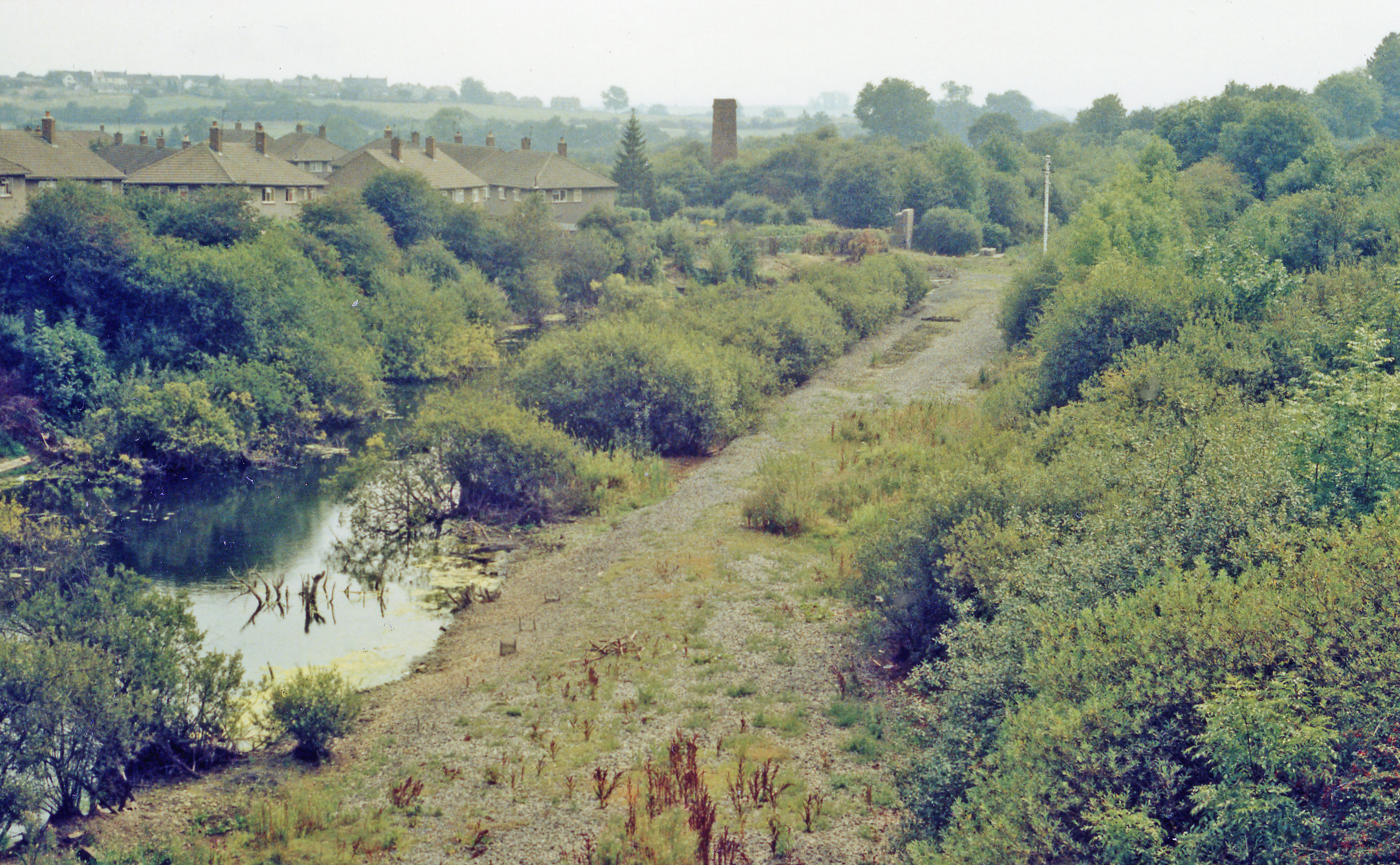
