= Desford railway station =

Former railway station in Leicestershire, England

Desford
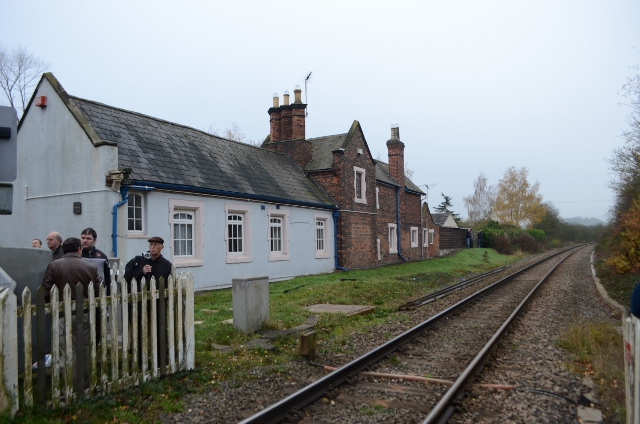

General information
- Location: Newtown Unthank, Hinckley and Bosworth; England
- Coordinates: 52.632°N 1.283°W
- Grid reference: SK486041
- Platforms: 2

Other information
- Status: Disused

History
- Original company: Leicester and Swannington Railway
- Pre-grouping: Midland Railway
- Post-grouping: London, Midland and Scottish Railway

Key dates
- 18 July 1832: First station opened as Desford Lane
- by 26 April 1833: Renamed Desford
- 27 March 1848: Resited
- 7 September 1964: Station closed
Location

Desford railway station was a railway station in Leicestershire, England on the Leicester and Swannington Railway, which later became part of the Midland Railway's Leicester to Burton upon Trent Line.

== History ==
The original station opened on 18 July 1832; originally named Desford Lane, it was renamed Desford by 26 April 1833. This station was closed on 27 March 1848, being replaced by a new station, also named Desford, sited 135 metres (148 yd) to the west of the original. The station was about 0.6 miles (1 km) northeast of Desford village, close to the hamlet of Newtown Unthank.

British Railways closed the station on 7 September 1964 but the line remains open for freight traffic.

Preceding station	Disused railways	Following station
Ratby; Line and station closed	Midland Railway; Leicester and Swannington Railway	Merry Lees; Line open, station closed
Kirby Muxloe; Line open, station closed	Midland Railway; Leicester to Burton upon Trent Line	Merry Lees; Line open, station closed
