= Willington railway station =

Railway station in Derbyshire, England

Willington
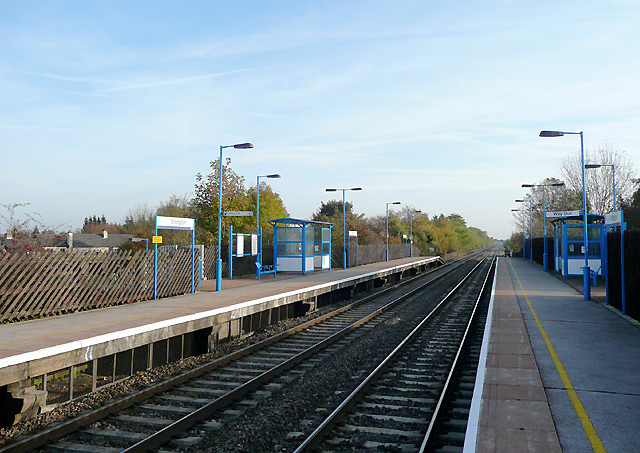

General information
- Location: Willington, South Derbyshire; England
- Coordinates: 52.854°N 1.563°W
- Grid reference: SK294285
- Manager: East Midlands Railway
- Platforms: 2

Other information
- Station code: WIL
- Classification: DfT category F2

Key dates
- 12 August 1839: Opened as Willington
- 1 October 1855: Renamed Willington and Repton
- 1 May 1877: Renamed Repton and Willington
- 1 October 1899: Renamed Willington for Repton
- Unknown: Renamed Repton and Willington
- 4 March 1968: Closed
- 1 April 1994: Reopened as Willington

Passengers
- 2021/22: ▲35,542
- 2022/23: ▼27,674
- 2023/24: ▲29,374
- 2024/25: ▲40,140
- 2025/26: ▲52,316
Location
Notes
- Passenger statistics from the Office of Rail and Road

Willington railway station (formerly known as Willington and Repton, Willington for Repton and Repton and Willington) serves the village of Willington in Derbyshire, England. The station is 6¼ miles (10 km) south-west of Derby on the Cross Country Route. The station is operated by East Midlands Railway but none of their services calls here. Only CrossCountry services call at the station.

The original station was opened in 1839 by the Birmingham and Derby Junction Railway on its original route from Derby to Hampton-in-Arden, meeting the London and Birmingham Railway for London.

The station was renamed Repton and Willington in 1855, with a notice on the platform: "Alight here for Repton School". The station closed in 1968 as part of the Beeching Axe, before being reopened in 1994.

== Services ==
All services are operated by CrossCountry. East Midlands Railway operate the station but none of their trains call here. The present station was constructed in 1994. It was planned as part of the Ivanhoe line which would run through to Loughborough, but as of 2024 this has yet to come to fruition.

During their franchise, East Midlands Trains ran a couple of semi-fast services from Burton upon Trent to London St Pancras. The last London service to call at Willington was on Saturday 13 September 2008. Passengers for London must now change at Birmingham New Street or Tamworth for services to London Euston operated by Avanti West Coast and London North Western Railway or at Derby for the original East Midlands Railway services to London St Pancras.

Services operate several times each day in each direction northbound to Nottingham via Derby and southbound to Cardiff Central via Birmingham New Street, Cheltenham Spa, Gloucester and Newport, running a primarily structured two-hourly service from around 07:00 to around 15:00. From 15:00, services operate three-hourly (one in each direction around 21:00 with the final service running northbound only towards Nottingham at 23:46). There is an hourly service towards Nottingham during the morning peak.

There is no Sunday service.

Despite being one stop down the line from Peartree, there is no direct connection between the two stations.

Preceding station	National Rail	Following station
Burton-on-Trent	CrossCountry Cardiff – Birmingham – Nottingham Mondays-Saturdays only	Derby

== History ==
The station opened on 26 May 1995 at a cost of £565,000, which was funded by Derbyshire County Council with a contribution from South Derbyshire District Council. The station, which is near to a facility for Toyota, was intended to be part of the Loughborough-Burton-Derby line, known as the Ivanhoe line. Unit 150 101 formed the first service from the station.
