= Gresley railway station =

Former railway station in Derbyshire, England

Gresley
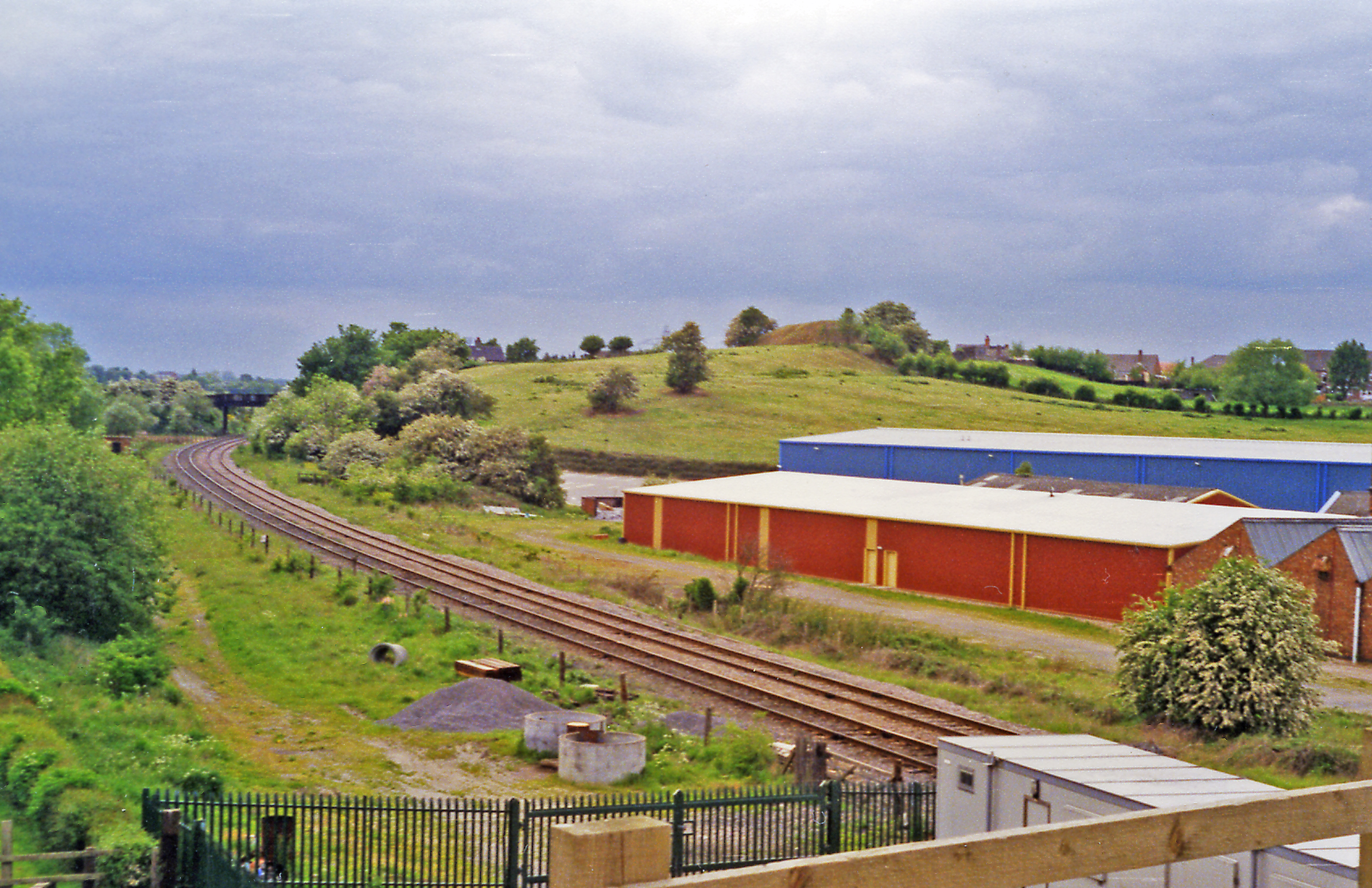
- Site of the station in 1995

General information
- Location: Castle Gresley, South Derbyshire; England
- Coordinates: 52.7571°N 1.5806°W
- Grid reference: SK284178
- Platforms: 2

Other information
- Status: Disused

History
- Original company: Midland Railway
- Pre-grouping: Midland Railway
- Post-grouping: London Midland and Scottish Railway

Key dates
- 2 October 1848: opened
- c. 1869: resited
- 7 September 1964: closed
Location

Gresley railway station was a railway station at Castle Gresley, Derbyshire on the Leicester to Burton upon Trent Line.

== History ==
The line was built for the Midland Railway and the station opened on 2 October 1848. Originally sited to the west of the road bridge, the station was resited to the east of the bridge c. 1869. Gresley station was closed on 7 September 1964 but the line remains open for freight traffic.

From 1906 to 1927, a branch of the Burton and Ashby Light Railway terminated at the station.

In the 1990s BR planned to restore passenger services between Leicester and Burton as the second phase of its Ivanhoe Line project. However, after the privatisation of British Rail in 1995 this phase of the project was discontinued. In 2009 the Association of Train Operating Companies published a £49 million proposal to restore passenger services to the line that would include reopening a station at Gresley to serve the town of Swadlincote.

== Route ==
Preceding station	Historical railways	Following station
Moira; Line open, station closed	Midland Railway; Leicester to Burton upon Trent Line	Burton-on-Trent; Line and station open
Donisthorpe; Line and station closed	Midland Railway; Leicester to Burton upon Trent Line	Burton-on-Trent; Line and station open
