= Bardon Hill railway station =

Former railway station in Leicestershire, England

Bardon Hill
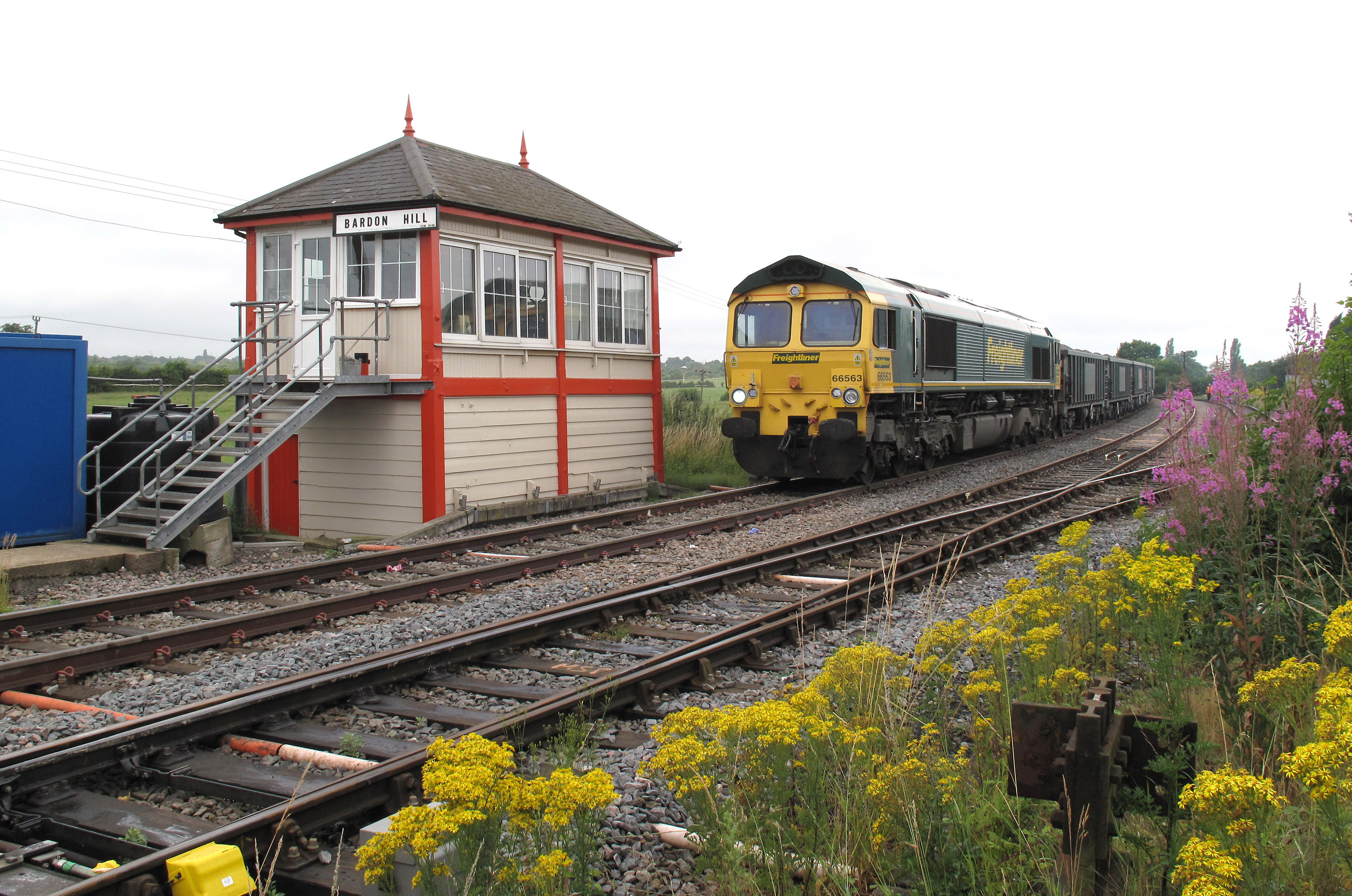
- Signal cabin at the site of Bardon Hill station

General information
- Location: Bardon, North West Leicestershire; England
- Coordinates: 52.7097°N 1.3465°W
- Grid reference: SK442126
- Platforms: 2

Other information
- Status: Disused

History
- Pre-grouping: Midland Railway
- Post-grouping: London, Midland and Scottish Railway

Key dates
- 27 April 1833: Opened as Ashby Road
- 1 January 1847: Name changed to Bardon Hill
- 1 March 1849: Closed
- 1 September 1849: Reopened
- 12 May 1952: Closed
Location

Bardon Hill railway station was a railway station in Leicestershire, England, on the Leicester and Swannington Railway, which later became part of the Midland Railway's Leicester to Burton upon Trent Line.

The village of Bardon was built to serve the large granite quarry on Bardon Hill. The quarry has for many decades provided significant freight traffic for the railway, and in about 1990 the village was demolished to let the quarry expand. British Railways had closed Bardon Hill station in 1952 but the line remains open for freight traffic.

Preceding station	Historical railways	Following station
Bagworth and Ellistown; Line open, station closed	Midland Railway; Leicester to Burton upon Trent Line	Coalville Town; Line open, station closed
