= Burton upon Trent Corporation Tramways =

Tramway operator in England

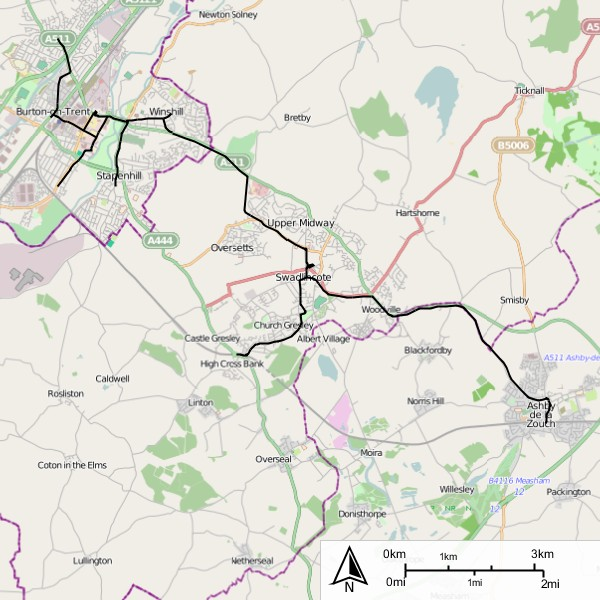
- Map of the Burton Corporation Tramways and the Burton and Ashby Light Railway

Operation
- Locale: Burton upon Trent, England
- Open: 3 August 1903
- Close: 31 December 1929
- Status: Closed

Infrastructure
- Track gauge: 3 ft 6 in (1,067 mm)
- Propulsion system: Electric
- Depot: Horninglow Road

Statistics
- Route length: 8.5 miles (13.7 km)

Burton upon Trent Corporation Tramways was a tramway service in Burton upon Trent between 1903 and 1929.

The tramway opened on 3 August 1903. In 1906, the Burton and Ashby Light Railway was opened and its cars used the Burton Corporation tracks as far as the junction of Bearwood Hill Road and High Bank Road, where they moved onto their own tracks.

The system comprised four routes going out from Station Street to Horninglow, Branston Road, Stapenhill, and Winshill. The depot was in Horninglow Road.

The initial 20 tramcars were built by the Electric Railway & Tramway Carriage Works of Preston. A further four cars were obtained in 1919.

The system was closed on 31 December 1929.
