= Moira railway station (England) =

Former railway station in Leicestershire, England

Moira
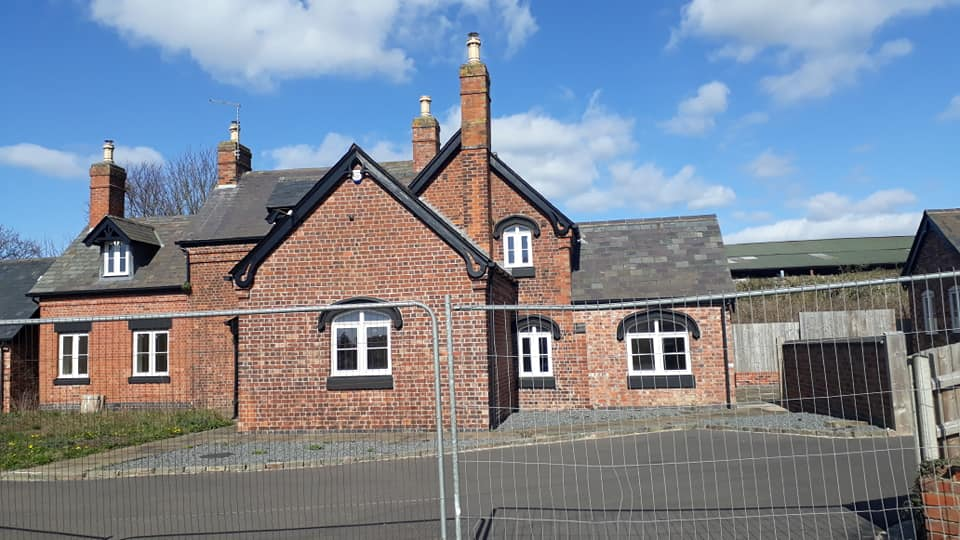
- Moira railway station in 2019

General information
- Location: Moira, North West Leicestershire; England
- Coordinates: 52.7388°N 1.5317°W
- Grid reference: SK317157
- Platforms: 2

Other information
- Status: Disused

History
- Pre-grouping: Midland Railway
- Post-grouping: London Midland and Scottish Railway

Key dates
- 1849: opened
- 1964: closed
Location

Moira railway station was a railway station at Moira, Leicestershire on the Leicester to Burton upon Trent Line.

== History ==
The line was built for the Midland Railway and opened in 1849. Moira station was closed in 1964 but the line remains open for freight traffic.

The former station building can be seen at the end of Station Drive, Moira, just off the main Ashby Road. The former station is also reflected in the name of the village pub, the Railway Inn.

In the 1990s BR planned to restore passenger services to the line as the second phase of its Ivanhoe Line project. However, after the privatisation of British Rail in 1995 this phase of the project was discontinued. In 2009 the Association of Train Operating Companies published a £49 million proposal to restore passenger services to the line that would include reopening a station at Moira.

Preceding station	Disused railways	Following station
Ashby de la Zouch; Line open, station closed	Midland Railway; Leicester to Burton upon Trent Line	Gresley; Station closed, line open
Worthington; Line and station closed	Midland Railway; Leicester to Burton upon Trent Line	Woodville; Line and station closed
