= Coalville Town railway station =

Former railway station in Leicestershire, England

Coalville Town
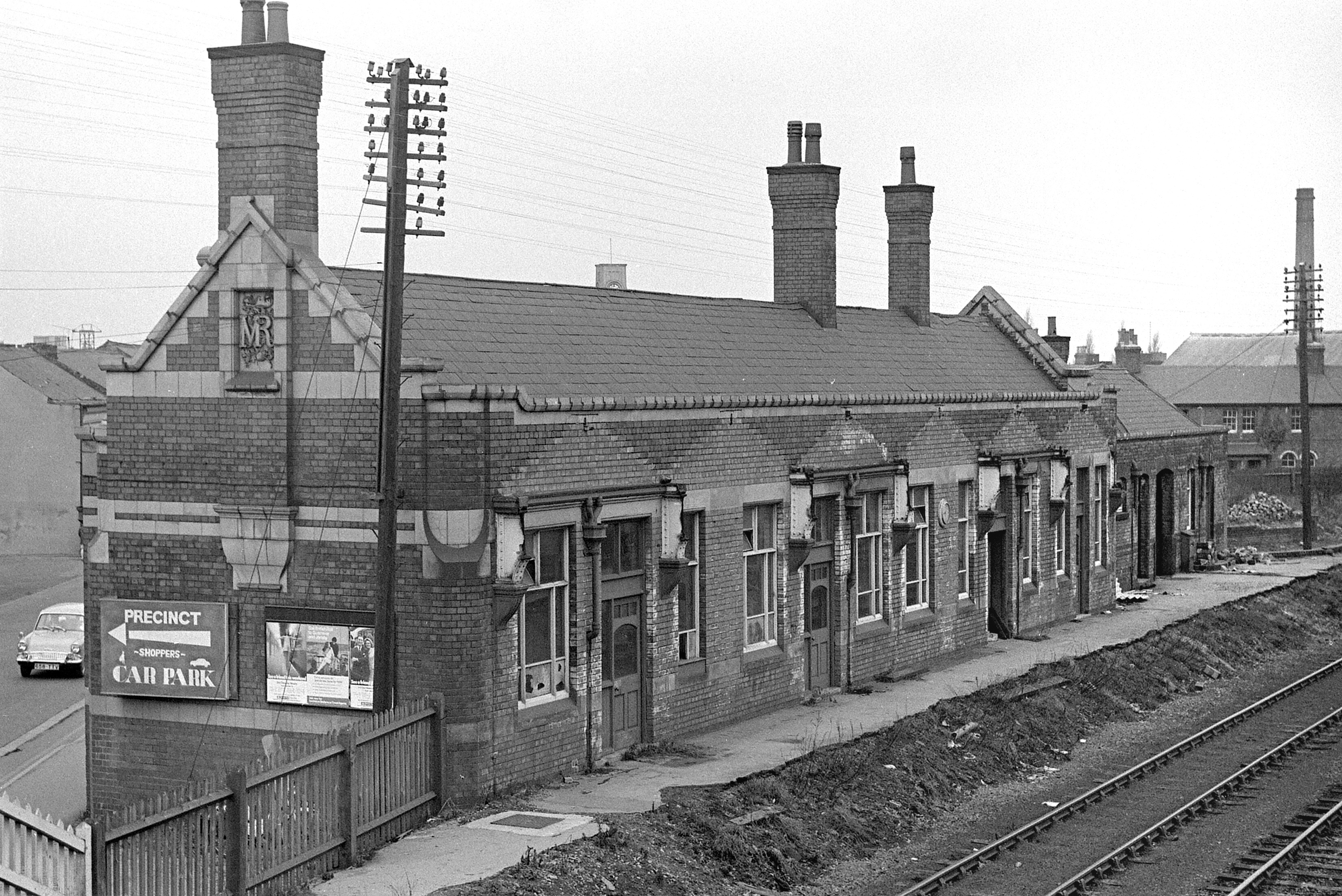
- Remains of Coalville Town station, 1969

General information
- Location: Coalville, North West Leicestershire; England
- Coordinates: 52.724°N 1.372°W
- Grid reference: SK425142
- Platforms: 2

Other information
- Status: Disused

History
- Original company: Leicester and Swannington Railway
- Pre-grouping: Midland Railway
- Post-grouping: London, Midland and Scottish Railway

Key dates
- 27 April 1833: Passengers purchase tickets at the "Railway Hotel" on Long Lane
- 27 March 1848: Station opened as Coalville
- 2 June 1924: Renamed Coalville Town
- 7 September 1964: station closed
Location

Coalville Town was a railway station at Coalville in Leicestershire on the Leicester to Burton upon Trent Line. Passenger business was carried out at the "Railway Hotel" when the line opened in 1833 until the first Coalville station was opened by the Midland Railway in 1848. The Coalville station was replaced in 1894 and closed in 1964, although the line remains in use for freight.

== History ==
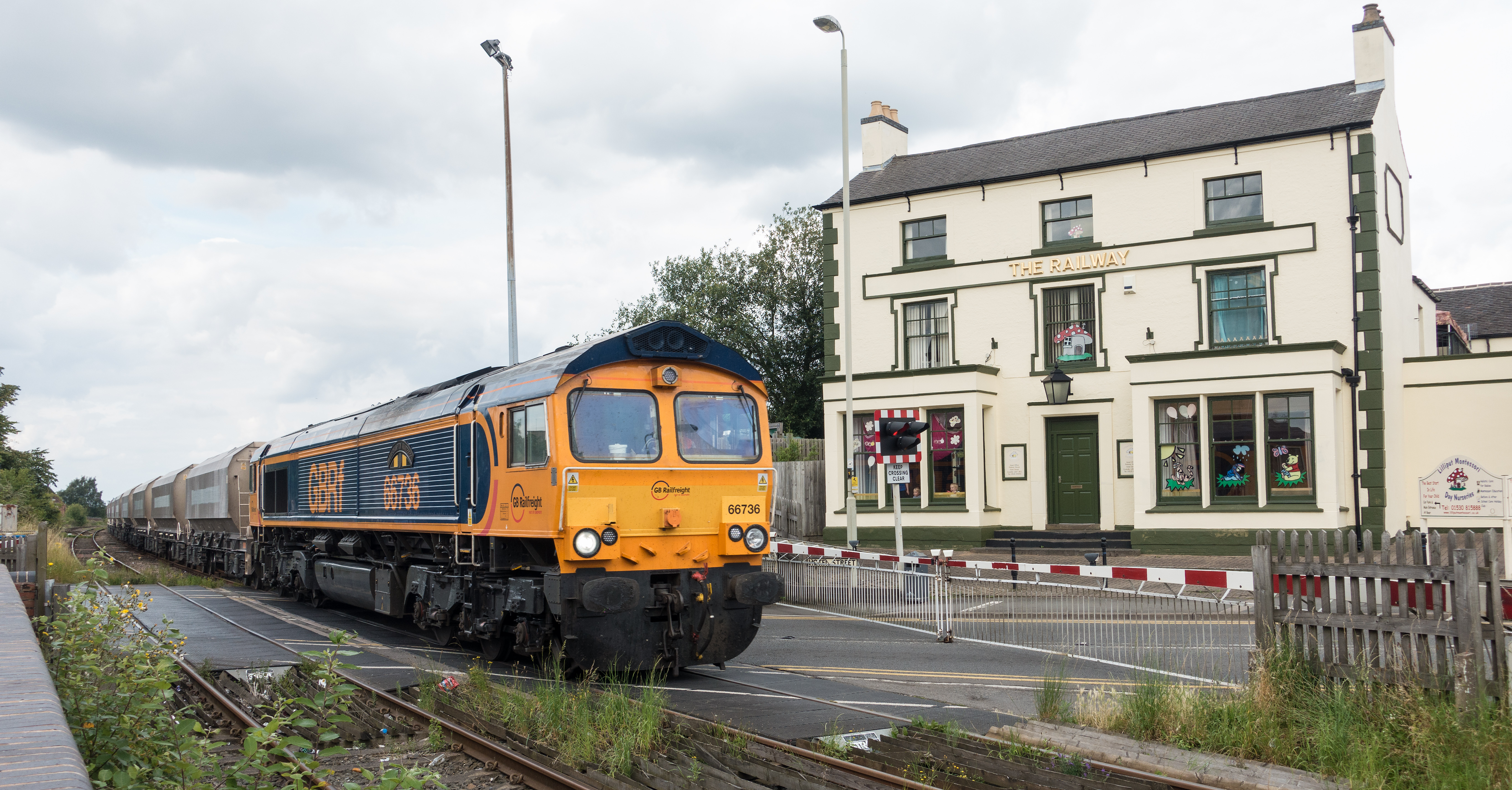
Freight train crossing High Street/Hotel Street in the centre of Coalville, July 2016. The building in the background was previously the "Railway Hotel" where passengers could buy tickets for the trains until the Midland Railway opened Coalville station just beyond in 1848.

The Leicester and Swannington Railway was originally built to carry coal and there was little provision for any passenger traffic. When the railway opened at Long Lane, now Coalville, in 1833 passenger business had to be carried out at the "Railway Hotel" adjacent to the level crossing. The first proper Coalville station was opened in 1848 after the line had been taken over by the Midland Railway. This in turn was rebuilt in 1894, being renamed Coalville Town in 1924 to distinguish it from Coalville East on the rival Charnwood Forest Railway. British Railways closed Coalville Town on 7 September 1964 when passenger services were ended on the line. The line remains open for freight only. Coalville Town was the most important station between Leicester and Burton-on-Trent and was built to fuller dimensions to reflect this.

The station was to the north of the A50 road beside the level crossing, which was controlled by a signal box that was removed in 1986 and re-erected at the former Snibston Colliery. All the other station buildings have been demolished. The former Railway pub next to the level crossing is now a children's nursery.

== Motive power depot ==
British Railways closed Mantle Lane motive power depot at Coalville in 1990. Its "Category A" status was a clerical error, and it should have been "Category C". The British Railways depot on the site was unusual in that it had no fuelling points, fitters or any other shed facilities. Locomotives would be taken in ferries to nearby Burton-on-Trent (until it closed) or Leicester for refuelling, water and sandbox filling. This perhaps shows why it was a surprise to find it as an A-listed depot. Little remains at the site which hints at its formerly busy railway past. Two tracks remain where once lay four 'on shed' as it were.

== Reopening proposals ==
In the 1990s BR planned to restore passenger services between Leicester and Burton as the second phase of its Ivanhoe Line project. However, after the privatisation of British Rail in 1995 this phase of the project was discontinued. In 2009 the Association of Train Operating Companies published a £49 million proposal to restore passenger services to the line that would include reopening a station at Coalville.

Preceding station	Historical railways	Following station
Bardon Hill; Line open, station closed	Midland Railway; Leicester to Burton upon Trent Line	Swannington; Line open, station closed
Hugglescote; Line open, station closed	Midland Railway; Leicester to Burton upon Trent Line	branch to Coleorton Tramway; Line and station closed
