= Burton and Ashby Light Railway =

Tramway system in the UK

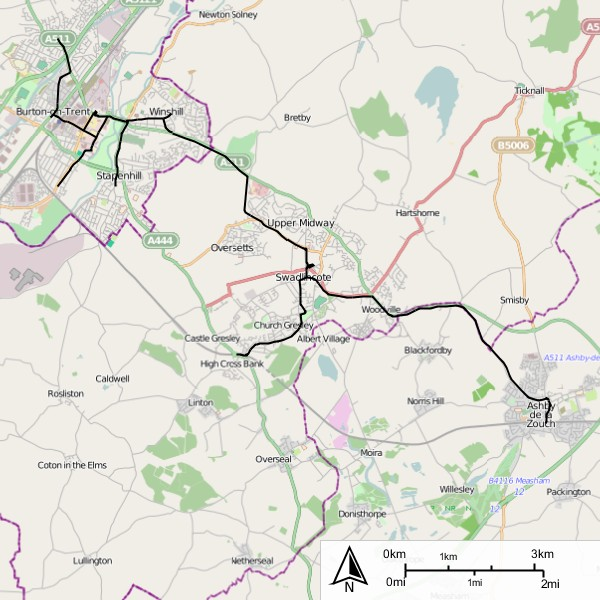
- Map of the Burton Corporation Tramways and the Burton and Ashby Light Railway

Operation
- Locale: Ashby-de-la-Zouch, Burton upon Trent, England

Statistics
Electric era: 1906–1927
- Status: Closed
- Operators: Midland Railway and London, Midland and Scottish Railway
- Track gauge: 3 ft 6 in (1,067 mm)
- Propulsion system: Electricity (diesel generation)
- Depot: Swadlincote
- Route length: 10.12 miles (16.29 km)

The Burton and Ashby Light Railway was a tramway system operating between Burton upon Trent and Ashby-de-la-Zouch between 1906 and 1927.

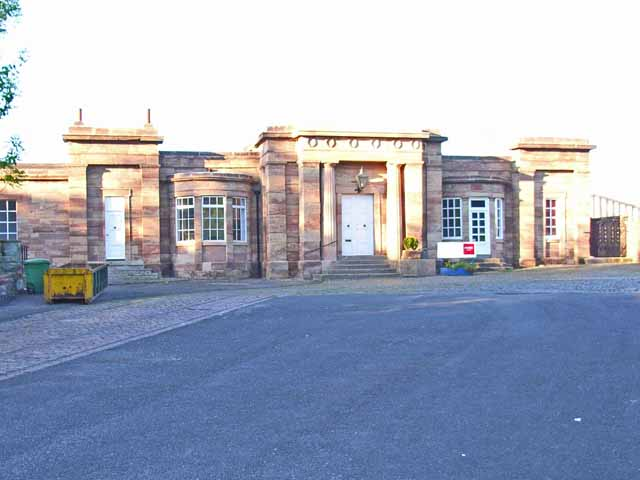
Remains of the tram track at Ashby-de-la-Zouch Railway Station

== History ==
The tramway opened on 2 July 1906 and was operated by the Midland Railway. The system used the tracks of the Burton upon Trent Corporation Tramways from a terminus by the Town Hall in Wellington Street through Station Street, Borough Road and Guild Street before using its own infrastructure through Swadlincote to Ashby-de-la-Zouch. There was a branch from Swadlincote and Woodville to Gresley railway station at Castle Gresley which opened on 24 September 1906.

The journey time from Ashby-de-la-Zouch to the terminus in Burton on Trent was a minimum of 64 minutes and a 10-minute interval service was offered, requiring 17 vehicles.

One unusual feature of the line was the Swadlincote power house which was fitted with two 240 brake horsepower (180 kW) diesel engines, rather than the more traditional steam power. The adjacent depot could accommodate a total of 24 trams but the company only ever owned 20.

The Brush Electric Company of Loughborough provided the open top tramcars. Each had two 25 horsepower (19 kW) Westinghouse 80 motors and capacity for 51 passengers. The livery was Crimson Lake and white with a Midland crest. When the company was taken over by the London Midland and Scottish Railway in 1923, the cars were repainted.

The system was taken over by the London, Midland and Scottish Railway company when it absorbed the Midland Railway in 1923, and the system was closed by the London Midland and Scottish Railway (Burton and Ashby Light Railway Abandonment) Order 1927 (SR&O 1927/94) on 19 February 1927.

At closure, three cars were sold to the Tynemouth and District Electric Traction Company and the remaining ten were sold locally for domestic or rural use.

== Car 14 ==
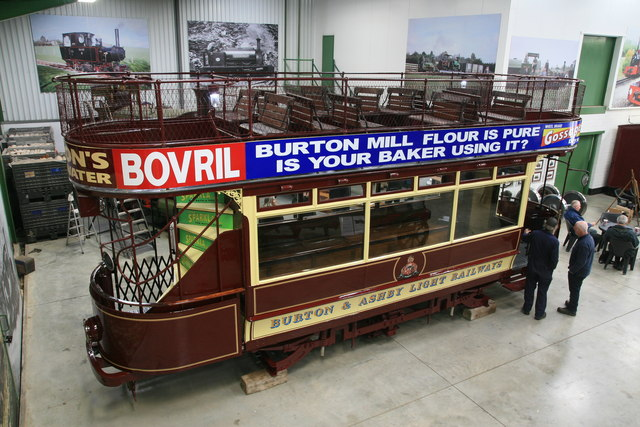
Car 14 at the Statfold Barn Railway.

Car No 14 was eventually transported to Detroit where it operated on a heritage trolley line from 1976 until closure in 2003. It was in storage at a Detroit Department of Transportation facility as of 2012. In October 2014 it was put up for sale by the City of Detroit, and the tram was repatriated to the United Kingdom, and is now in service at the Statfold Barn Railway.
