= Burton-on-Trent railway station =

Railway station in Staffordshire, England

Burton-on-Trent
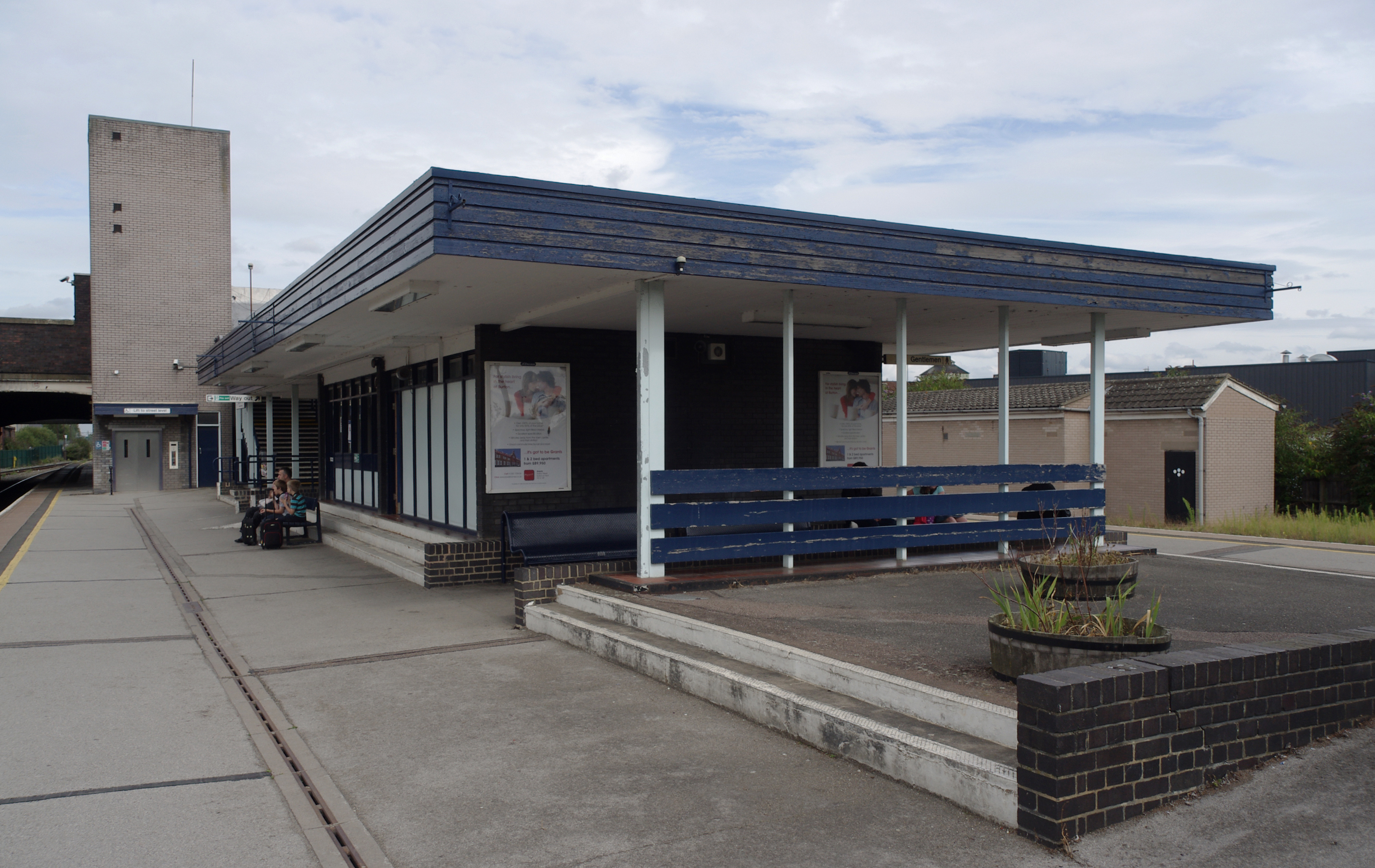

General information
- Location: Burton upon Trent, East Staffordshire; England
- Coordinates: 52.8059°N 1.6425°W
- Ordnance Survey National Grid: SK242232
- Manager: East Midlands Railway
- Platforms: 2

Other information
- Station code: BUT
- Classification: DfT category D

Key dates
- 1839: First station
- 1883: Second station
- 1970: Third station (Todays station)

Passengers
- 2020/21: ▼0.182 million
- Interchange: ▼1,393
- 2021/22: ▲0.573 million
- Interchange: ▲5,217
- 2022/23: ▲0.663 million
- Interchange: ▲12,749
- 2023/24: ▲0.705 million
- Interchange: ▼12,603
- 2024/25: ▲0.913 million
- Interchange: ▼8,132
Location
Notes
- Passenger statistics from the Office of Rail and Road

Burton-on-Trent railway station is a mainline railway station located in the town of Burton upon Trent, Staffordshire, England. It is owned by Network Rail and managed by East Midlands Railway, although only CrossCountry services call at this station.

== History ==
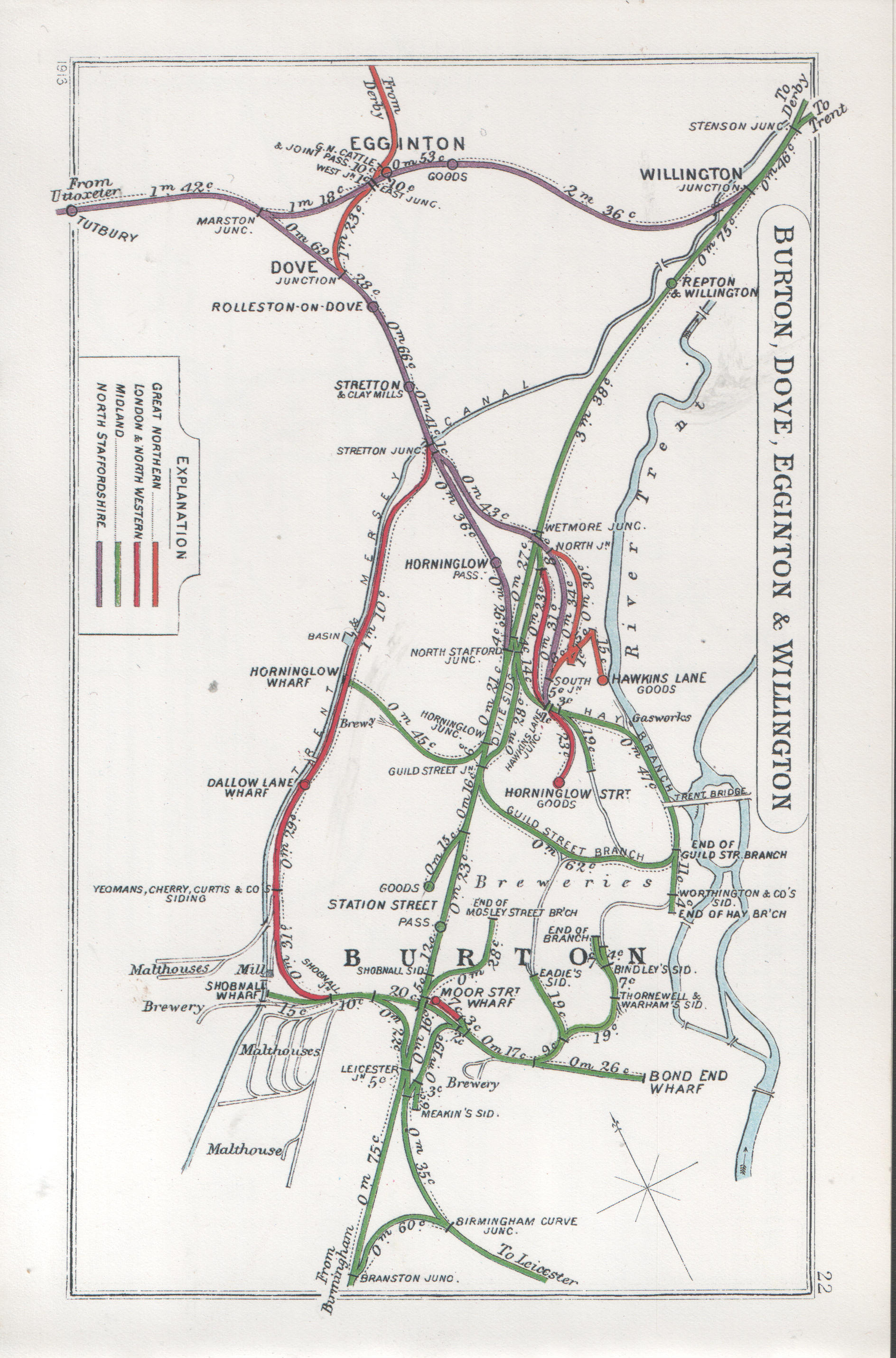
A 1913 Railway Clearing House map of railways in the vicinity of Burton-on-Trent showing several of the brewery lines

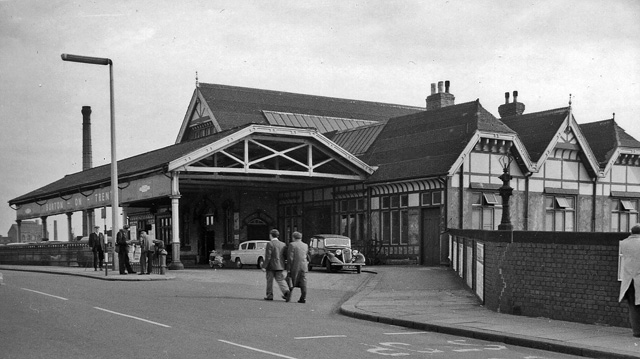
The station at street level in 1962

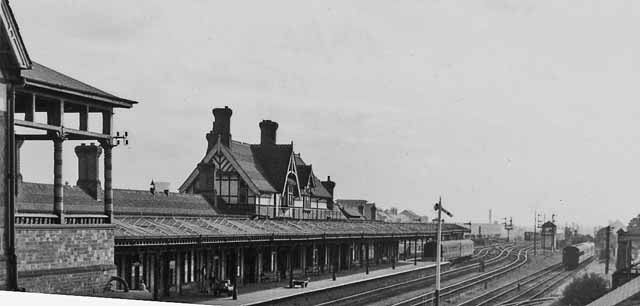
The station at track level in 1962

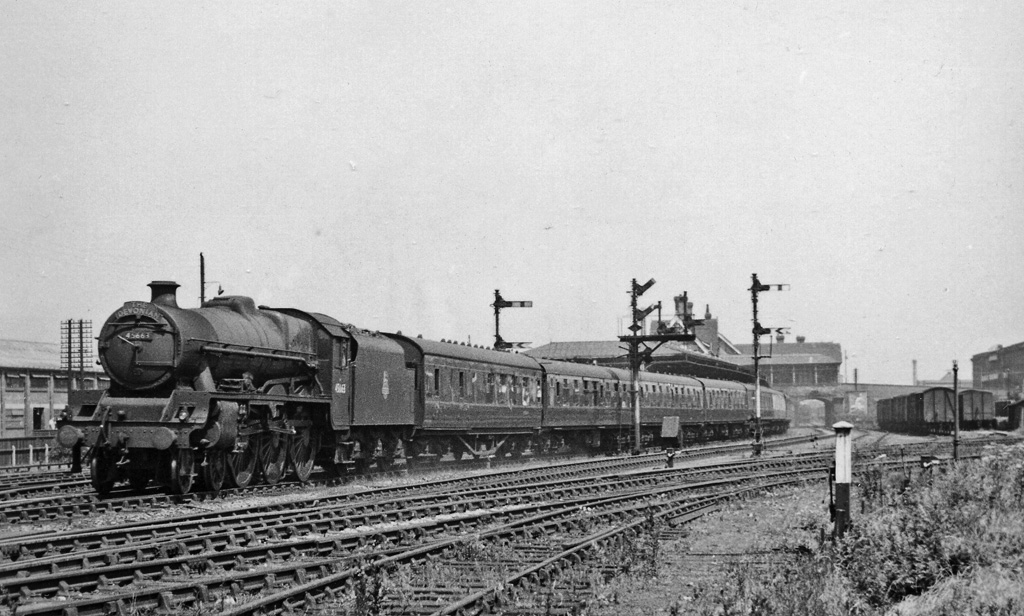
Up 'Devonian' express leaving Burton-upon-Trent

=== First station (1839-1883) ===
The original Burton on Trent station was opened in 1839 by the Birmingham and Derby Junction Railway on its original route from Derby to Hampton-in-Arden, meeting the London and Birmingham Railway for London. The station originally consisted of a hut and an adjacent level crossing. A more substantial two-storey building was later constructed.

=== Second station (1883-1970) ===
In 1881, an increase in passengers and goods using the railway led to the old station being demolished and a temporary island platform constructed. A new station was constructed 150 yards further south and separated from the roadway on the bridge by iron palisading. There was a large, covered cabstand, which offered access to the booking hall, 65 ft wide, 27 ft deep and 35 ft high in the early English style, partly timbered. The stairs provided access to the island platform on which were built waiting rooms for ladies and gentlemen, and a first-class refreshment and dining room and a third-class refreshment room. A WH Smith newsagent stall was also located on the platform. The platforms were covered with a glass canopy and extended close to one-quarter of a mile in length. The station was designed by the company architect John Holloway Sanders and erected by Messrs Cox of Leicester. The bridge was constructed under the supervision of the company engineer, Mr. Campion. The new station re-opened in 1883.

Until the 1960s the station also served as the terminus for a number of secondary routes, such as the South Staffordshire line to Lichfield City, the Leicester–Burton upon Trent line to Leicester via Coalville Town and to Tutbury and Hatton. These all closed to passenger traffic between 1960 and 1965.

=== Third station (1970-present) ===
As part of the British Railways modernisation plans, the station was rebuilt again in 1970. Of the previous station, only the staircase down to platform level remains. During the summer and autumn of 2011, the station underwent a £700,000 refurbishment, including removal of asbestos, improved facilities for disabled people, improved lighting and a refurbished waiting room.

In late 2019, the forecourt in front of the station was redeveloped to add a new taxi rank and bus departure bays.

== Facilities ==
Access to the station is from the bridge on Borough Road which crosses the railway line. At street level, there is a taxi rank, a shop and the station entrance which contains the ticket office. In order to reach the two platforms, passengers descend a broad staircase. A lift is also available.

Only a single building now stands at the platform level (Burton is an island station; its two platforms are on a single island) and this building incorporates a waiting room, toilets and a dispatcher's office. Timetable information is available from destination boards and real-time customer information screens with automated train announcements. There is a ramp for step-free access between the two platforms.

The station has the PlusBus scheme where train and bus tickets can be bought together at a saving.

== Motive power depot ==
As a centre for beer brewing, Burton generated a great deal of freight traffic. The town was criss-crossed by the brewery companies' private lines with a plethora of level crossings. In 1870 a new locomotive shed was built to the south of the station. This consisted of a roundhouse built round a 42-foot (13 m) turntable. In 1892 another roundhouse was added with a 50-foot (15 m) turntable. In 1923 these were replaced by 57-foot (17.4 m) and 55-foot (16.8 m) turntables respectively. Originally coded "2" by the Midland Railway, it became 17B in 1935.

By 1948 the depot had 111 locomotives allocated to it. With the arrival of diesel locomotives, a reorganisation of motive power districts in the London Midland Region took place in September 1963. Under this, the former Nottingham (16), Derby (17) and Toton (18) divisions were amalgamated, with Toton as the main shed for the division; this was coded 16A, and Burton-on-Trent became 16F. Steam traction was removed from this depot in September 1966 and it closed to steam in 1968, but carried on for diesel locomotive fuelling and stabling.

== Services ==
Burton station lies on the Cross Country Route between Derby and Birmingham New Street. All services that stop here are provided by CrossCountry.

Trains between Cardiff, Birmingham and Nottingham generally call here every hour in each direction.

Long-distance inter-city services, between the north-east and south-west, call here approximately once per hour or once every two hours each direction; these operate northbound towards Aberdeen, Edinburgh, Leeds, Newcastle or York and southbound to Bristol Temple Meads, Penzance or Plymouth.

The station is managed by East Midlands Railway, even though none of their trains call here. This is because CrossCountry does not manage any stations.

Preceding station	National Rail	Following station
Tamworth	CrossCountry Scotland and the North East to the South West and South Coast	Derby
Birmingham New Street	CrossCountry Scotland and the North East to the South West and South Coast	Derby
Tamworth	CrossCountry Cardiff – Birmingham – Nottingham	Willington
Wilnecote	CrossCountry Cardiff – Birmingham – Nottingham	Derby

Preceding station	Disused railways	Following station
Horninglow Line and station closed	Great Northern Railway Derbyshire and Staffordshire extension	Terminus
	Disused railways	
Terminus	Midland Railway; Swadlincote Loop Line	Swadlincote; Line and station closed
	Historical railways	
Terminus	Midland Railway Leicester–Burton upon Trent line	Gresley Line open, station closed
Branston (Staffordshire); Line open, station closed	Midland Railway; Birmingham and Derby Junction Railway	Willington

== Future ==
It has been proposed in the past that the line between Burton and Leicester, known as the Ivanhoe Line, to be reopened for passenger use. Services had originally been withdrawn in 1964 due to the Beeching Axe, though the line is still open for freight traffic. In January 2019, an action group called Campaign to Re-Open The Ivanhoe Line (CRIL) was formed in Swadlincote to campaign for the reopening of the line.

In June 2019, the Derby Telegraph published an article showing support for the reopening of the South Staffordshire Line for trams. According to the article, London-based consultants Cushman and Wakefield had put forward suggestions to both Staffordshire County Council and East Staffordshire Borough Council to look at bringing trams into Burton to promote tourism and businesses.

== In literature ==
The station, the railway sheds and the town's popular trainspotting locations feature significantly in the autobiographical book, Platform Souls by local author Nicholas Whittaker.
