= Leicester–Burton upon Trent line =

Freight-only railway line in England

Leicester–Burton-upon-Trent line
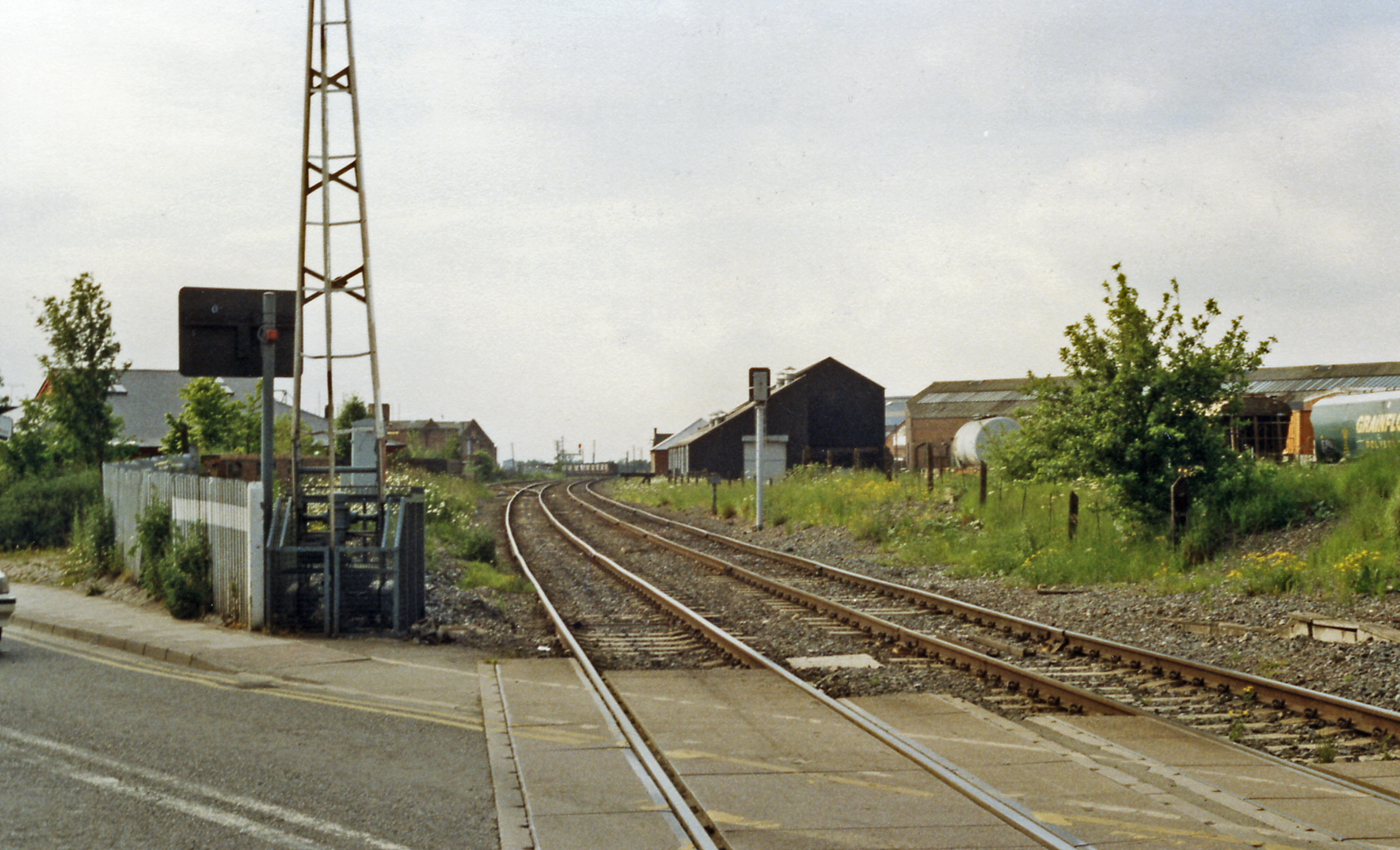
- Site of former Coalville Town station in 1988

Overview
- Status: Operational
- Owner: Network Rail
- Locale: East Midlands
- Termini: Leicester; Burton-upon-Trent
- Stations: None

Service
- Type: Freight-only line
- System: National Rail
- Daily ridership: 0

History
- Opened: 1832-1849
- Closed: 1964 to passenger services

Technical
- Number of tracks: Single and Double
- Track gauge: 4 ft 8 1/2 in (1,435 mm)
Route map
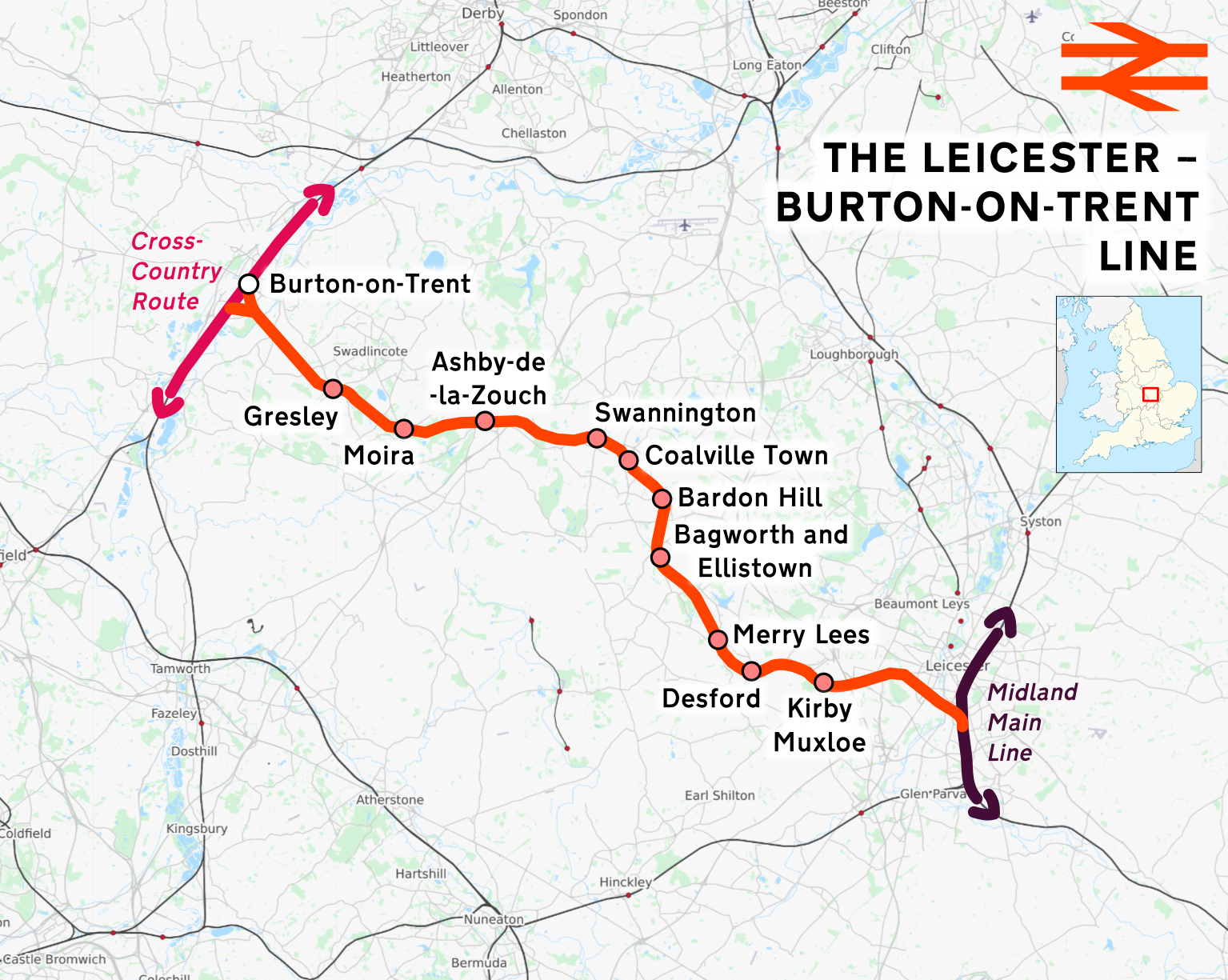
(Click to expand)

The Leicester–Burton upon Trent line is a freight-only railway line in England linking the Midland Main Line near Leicester to the Derby to Birmingham line at Burton upon Trent. (Note: The community is known as both Burton-on-Trent and Burton-upon-Trent, occasionally without the hyphens, and especially in former times, without the reference to the Trent. Network Rail currently (2022) uses Burton-on-Trent.) The line was built by the Midland Railway, which had acquired the Leicester and Swannington Railway in 1847, improving it and extending it. It opened throughout in 1849. The line connected an exceptional number of collieries and industrial premises, and several industrial branch lines were built radiating from it. Swadlincote was already an established community engaged in industry and there was a complex of branch lines there. The passenger service on the line was discontinued in 1964, and much of the mining-based industry has closed down; quarrying is the dominant residual originating traffic. There are proposals to reopen the passenger service, and these are under review at present (2022).

== History ==
=== Leicester and Swannington Railway ===
In the late eighteenth century and the early nineteenth century, Leicester was the dominant industrial location in the region. Its commercial activity generated a huge demand for coal and other materials, but there were limitations due to poor transport links from collieries. In fact the Nottinghamshire coalfield supplied much of the demand, transporting the minerals by canal and river. The collieries of West Leicestershire were nearer but lacked an efficient transport medium, relying on animal power on inadequate roads. The coalowners and other business interests built the Leicester and Swannington Railway, opening it in 1832. This was a remarkable enterprise when few other railways existed in the country. The line included a tunnel just over a mile in length, and two rope-worked inclined planes because of the difficult terrain.

=== Midland Railway acquisition ===
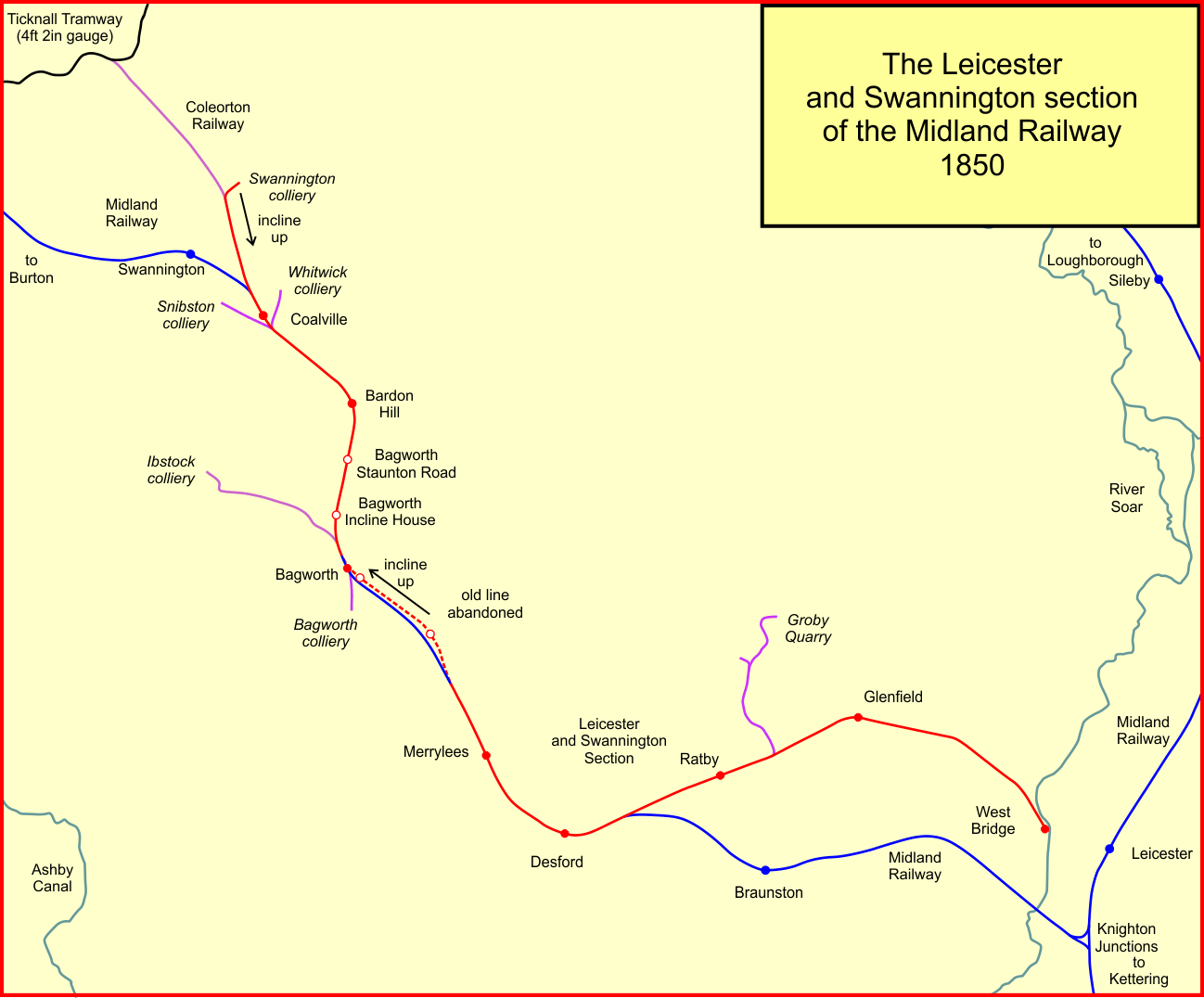
Leicester and Swannington Railway in 1850

The Midland Railway was formed in 1844 by the amalgamation of three separate railway companies (the Birmingham and Derby Junction Railway, the Midland Counties Railway and the North Midland Railway); they had formerly been in competitive opposition, but now under their chairman George Hudson, they were collectively able to consider expansion. Hudson was a very dynamic individual, and his methods were dubious, in fact eventually leading to disgrace. At this stage he saw that monopolistic possession and retention of a large area was important to the companies he controlled. This led him to wish to repel an incursion into those areas by existing or new competing railway companies.

The Leicester and Swannington company was under commercial pressure from other, competing railways and pits in the Erewash Valley and elsewhere, and it became known that it was susceptible to being purchased. Hudson arranged that the Midland Railway would purchase it, to forestall any incursion by a competitor. The acquisition was ratified by Parliament on 27 July 1846. The Midland began working the L&SR on 1 January 1847.

=== On to Burton ===
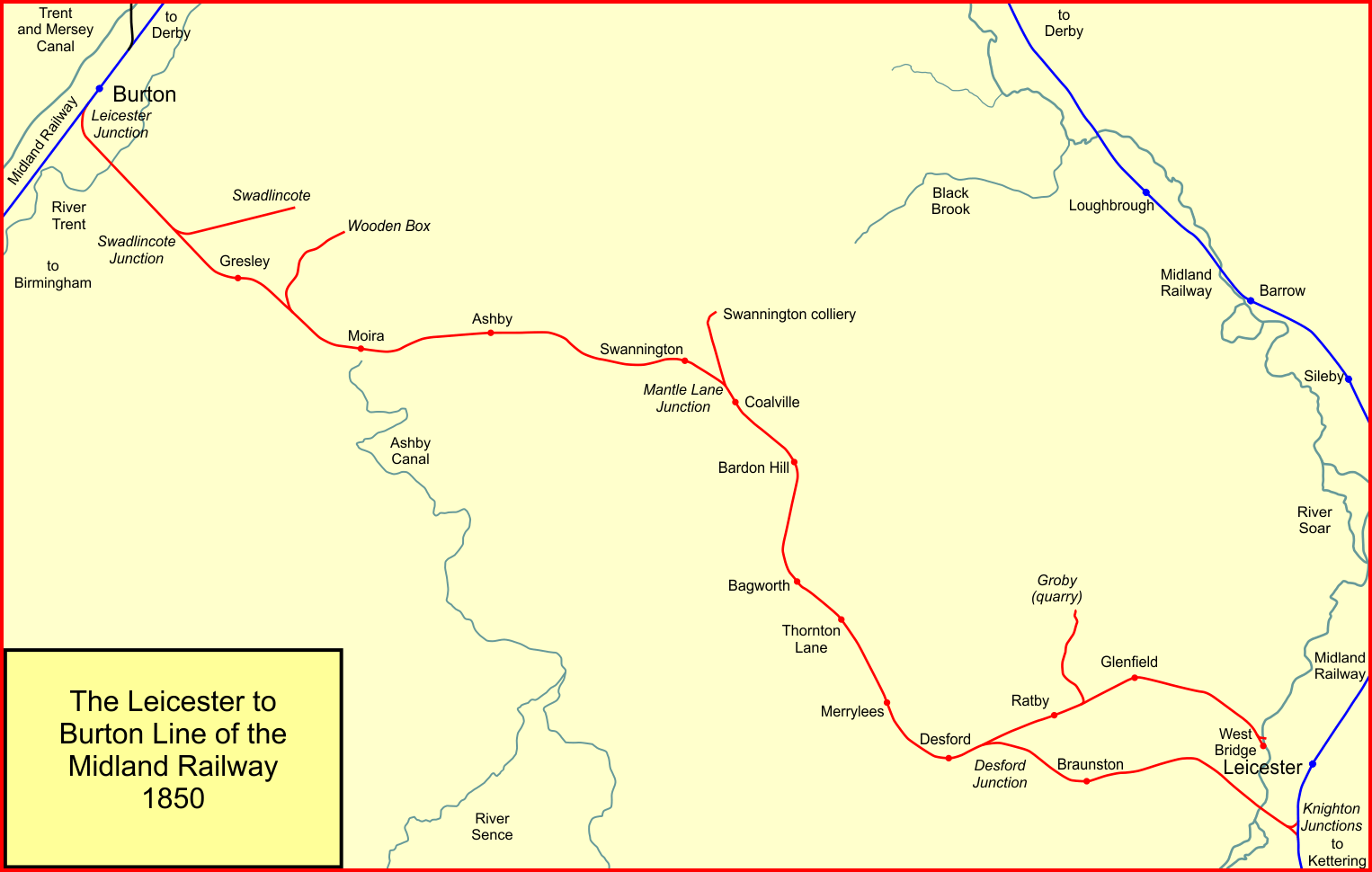
The Leicester to Burton line in 1850

As well as controlling the north-south main line through Leicester (the "Midland Main Line") the Midland Railway also had the former Birmingham and Derby Junction Railway, which ran south-west to north east through Burton; the two routes formed an inverted V, with the apex at Derby. George Hudson determined to build a line from Leicester to Burton, using part of the Leicester and Swannington line as an element of the route. As well as providing a useful connection, the line would connect several important colliery locations along its route. At the time, the L&SR network was not connected to any other part of the railway network. Hudson put this to shareholders, along with a considerable number of other schemes, at a shareholders’ meeting in May 1846. The cost was to be £461,000. This was a formality, for the necessary Act was passed on 3 August 1846. (The following year an amending Act was passed.)

The Midland’s plan therefore was to build to Burton from a junction with the L&SR at Long Lane (which later became known as Coalville), joining the LS&R there. In addition it would build a line from near Desford to the main line at Knighton, south of Leicester. The portion of the L&SR incorporated into this route was between Long Lane and Desford, and it included one of the rope-worked inclines on a 1 in 29 gradient. This was hardly practicable for a through main line route, and the Midland arranged to by-pass the incline. This was achieved by building a new double-track alignment alongside the original, taking a longer distance on easier gradients to achieve the climb. This was done and the new line opened throughout, after certain construction difficulties, on 1 August 1849.The opening of the line was a huge boost to the Leicestershire collieries, which were able to send their coal cheaply to all parts. Thus was a very severe blow to the canals.

== Connections ==
The dominant traffic of the Midland Railway in the area, and generally, was minerals. The new line passed through an area already active in mineral extraction and industry, and from the outset and throughout the following years, a number of connections to these sites were established. The primary connections at the outset were at Burton, with the Leicester and Swannington Railway, and at Leicester with the main line.

=== Junctions at Burton and Leicester ===
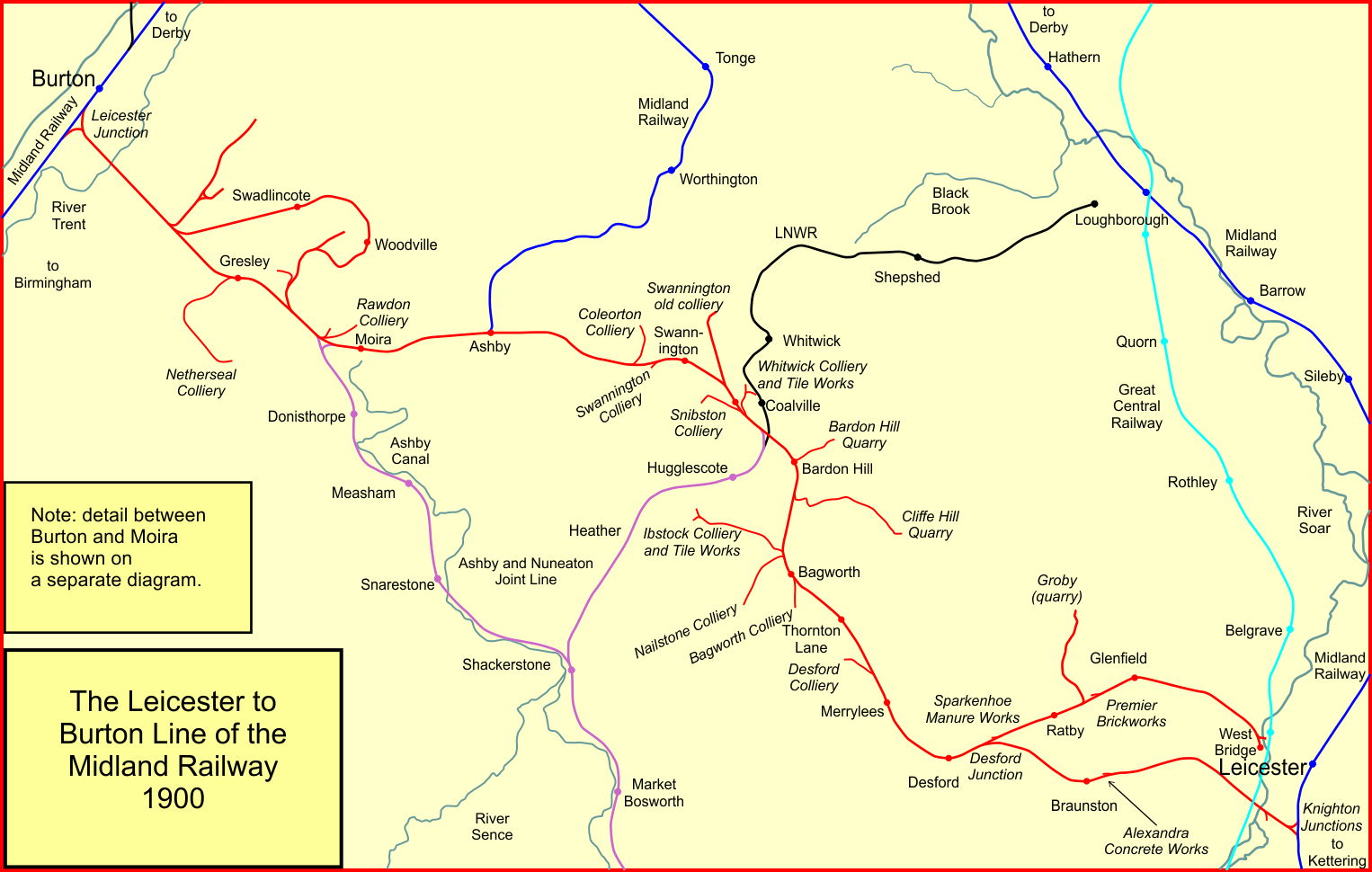
The Leicester to Burton line in 1900

The first connection at Burton was north facing, leading towards the station; the junction was named Leicester Junction. It was followed by a southward curve, known as Branston Curve, connecting with the main line at Branston Junction. The lines formed a triangle, and the eastern apex was named Birmingham Curve Junction. The Branston Curve was opened by 1 January 1863. At Leicester the line curved to a northward junction at Knighton Junction. An east to south spur was opened to goods traffic only on 15 February 1850, joining the main line at Knighton South Junction. The former Knighton Junction was renamed Knighton North Junction, and the western apex was named Saffron Lane Junction. The west-to-north curve at Knighton was closed in 1967.

=== Connections with the Leicester and Swannington network. ===
The Midland Railway had taken over the Leicester and Swannington Railway network by Act of 27 July 1846. The Midland began working the L&SR on 1 January 1847, and constructed the through Leicester to Burton line, using part of the L&SR. The former L&SR continued in use, and there was a new junction at Desford, and another at Swannington Junction, near present-day Coalville, to serve the respective extremities of the old L&SR. The original L&SR facilities at Leicester continued in use as the West Bridge branch. The West Bridge terminus was considered disgraceful for many years, and on 13 March 1893 it was replaced by a passenger station on a slightly different site. Passenger services were withdrawn on 24 September 1928 and freight on 2 May 1966. The short extremity at Swannington including the incline closed on 14 November 1947.

=== Swadlincote lines ===
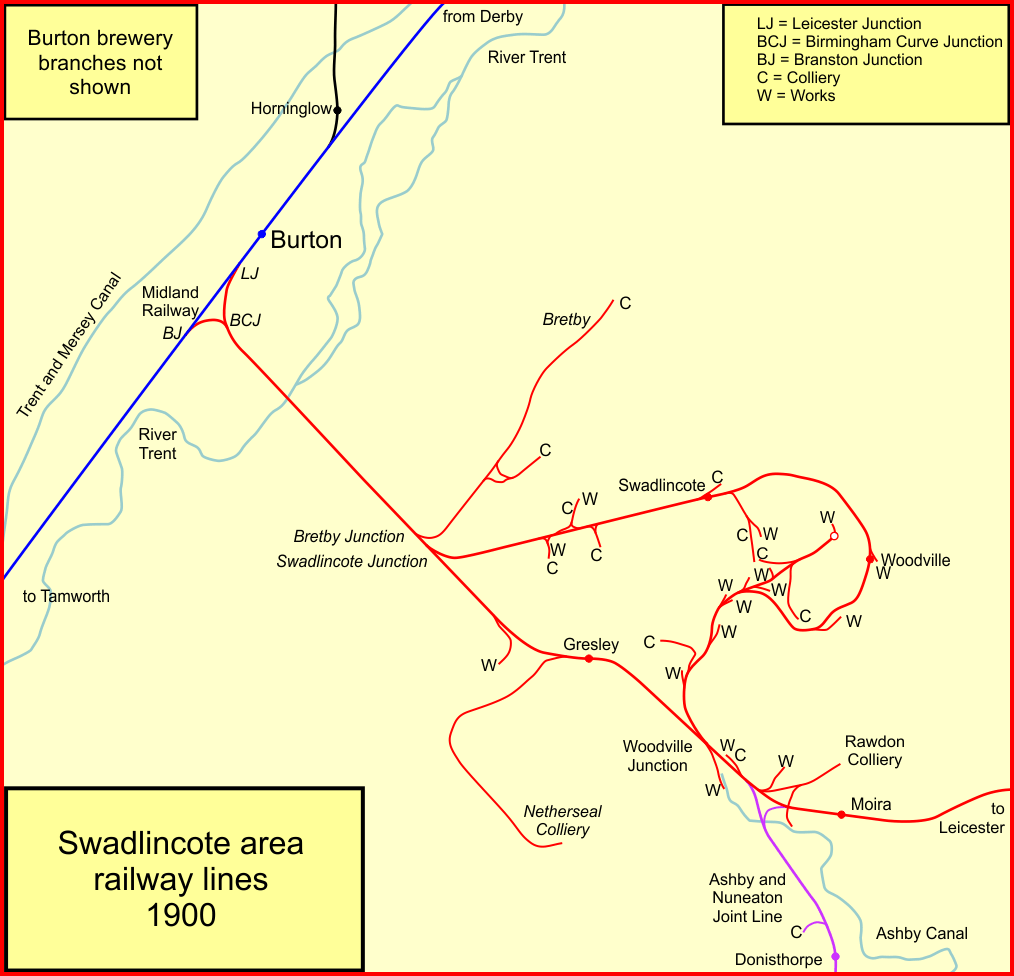
The Swadlincote lines

The area immediately to the east of the junction at Burton was exceptionally rich in minerals, chiefly coal but also a fine grade of fireclay as well as brickmaking and pottery clay and other materials. For many years the Swadlincote area had been a centre of extraction of these minerals, and of manufacturing from them. The line from Leicester to Burton did not pass directly through Swadlincote, but the authorising Act of Parliament, the Midland Railway (Leicester and Swannington Alteration) Act of 3 August 1846, for the line allowed for the construction of a Swadlincote branch line. It was a simple branch line about two miles long, and it opened to goods and mineral traffic on 2 October 1848, and to passengers on 1 July 1851. (Note: Gough gives July 1851 for goods and mineral, closed for some time in 1853, and opened to passengers on 1 June 1864. Gough adds "It seems possible that the Wooden Box and Swadlincote branches were both opened for goods traffic at the same time as the main line, i.e. in the autumn of 1848.")

The branch soon closed for a period during 1853, but reopened to goods traffic later that year. Passenger services were introduced on 1 June 1864.

=== Wooden Box branch ===
A little further east, another branch from the Leicester to Burton line was constructed, to a place named Wooden Box, opening by September 1851. The junction on the main line was called Wooden Box Junction at first. The branch had been authorised by the Midland Railway (Burton-upon-Trent to Nuneaton Act) of 16 July 1846. The line was closed on 1 October 1856, bit it reopened, still to goods traffic only, on 1 April 1859. The station and branch (and the main line junction) were renamed Woodville on 1 October 1868. This line closed on 1 October 1856, but it reopened on 1 April 1859, this time with a passenger service.

=== The Loop Line ===
In the 1870s it was realised that the Swadlincote branch could usefully be extended to a new station at Woodville. This was authorised by the Midland Railway (Additional Powers) Act of 29 June 1875. The topography of the terrain made a simple extension from Swadlincote to reach the existing Woodville station was impractical, so the extension was built in a wide sweep to the north-east of Woodville. New stations were built at Woodville and Swadlincote, and two tunnels were required on the line. It was opened to goods traffic on 12 April 1880, and to passenger services on 1 May 1883. The old Woodville station remained in use as a goods depot.

There remained a short gap between the new Woodville station (which was a terminus served from the north-east) and the old line to the original station, and powers were obtained to build a line closing the gap on 17 June 1878; construction was rather delayed and the section opened to all traffic on 1 September 1884.

In the early 1960s, a large marshalling yard was built a short distance from Swadlincote Junction, when Cadley Hill Colliery, dating from 1860, was modernised. The colliery was one of the last in South Derbyshire to close in March 1988; paradoxically it was one of the last National Coal Board collieries to use steam as motive power.

All the Swadlincote line passenger operations ceased on 6 October 1947. and the lines closed completely on 2 March 1964.

=== Bretby branch ===
To the west of the Swadlincote lines, the Bretby branch line ran from the main line in a north-easterly direction, for a distance of 2 1/2 miles. The Midland Railway opened the line on 1 October 1868. Connections off the branch were Bretby No.3 (or Stanton) pit and Lakes Brickyard, Klondyke Brickyard and Bretby Coal Wharf. A wooden platform was erected at the extremity for the benefit of the Earl of Carnarvon, whose seat was at Bretby Hall. Bretby Colliery closed in July 1960, but a drift mine was installed on the site, although that too closed in 1966.In any case the Bretby Colliery branch closed on 1 June 1963, although the branch was used until August 1968 for wagon storage.

=== Ashby and Nuneaton Joint Railway ===
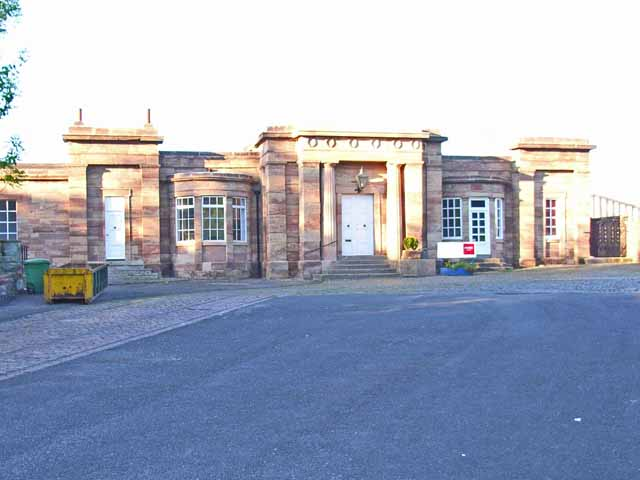
The old station at Ashby-de-la-Zouch

Both the Midland Railway and the rival London and North Western Railway sought to open a line to connect the coalmining district south of Ashby. After some skirmishes, they agreed to construct a line jointly, and it became the Ashby and Nuneaton Joint Railway. It was opened in 1873 from a triangular junction near Moira to Nuneaton, with a branch from Coalville to Shackerstone. Passenger train services were withdrawn in 1931 and, except for a short stub, the line closed entirely in 1971.

=== Derby line ===
A line from Derby to Ashby had been authorised on 5 July 1865; construction was from the Derby end and reached Worthington in 1869. Completion to Ashby was delayed until 1 January 1874, involving reconstruction of part of the Ticknall Tramway. The route was thinly populated and passenger traffic was discontinued on 22 September 1930. From 19 November 1939 to 31 December 1944 the War Department took over the part of the line south of Lount for railway training purposes as the Melbourne Military Railway. On returning the line to the London Midland and Scottish Railway, (Note: Successor since 1923 to the Midland Railway.) it was closed from Ashby to Lount in 1945, although sections nearer Derby lasted longer.

=== Drakelow power station ===
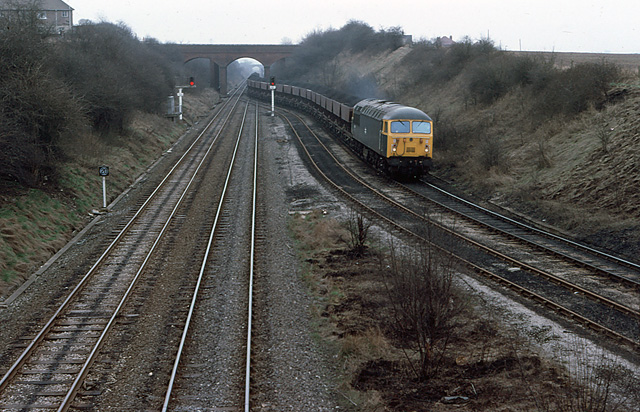
A coal train for Drakelow Power Station

A technologically advanced coal-fired power station was commissioned in 1955 at Drakelow, in the grounds of the former Drakelow Hall, not far from Burton. The site was much extended, and the location adjacent to the Leicester to Burton line enabled the delivery of large volumes of coal by rail, and extensive rail facilities were installed to streamline unloading. The power station was decommissioned in 2003.

== Diesels, closure to passengers and freight operation ==
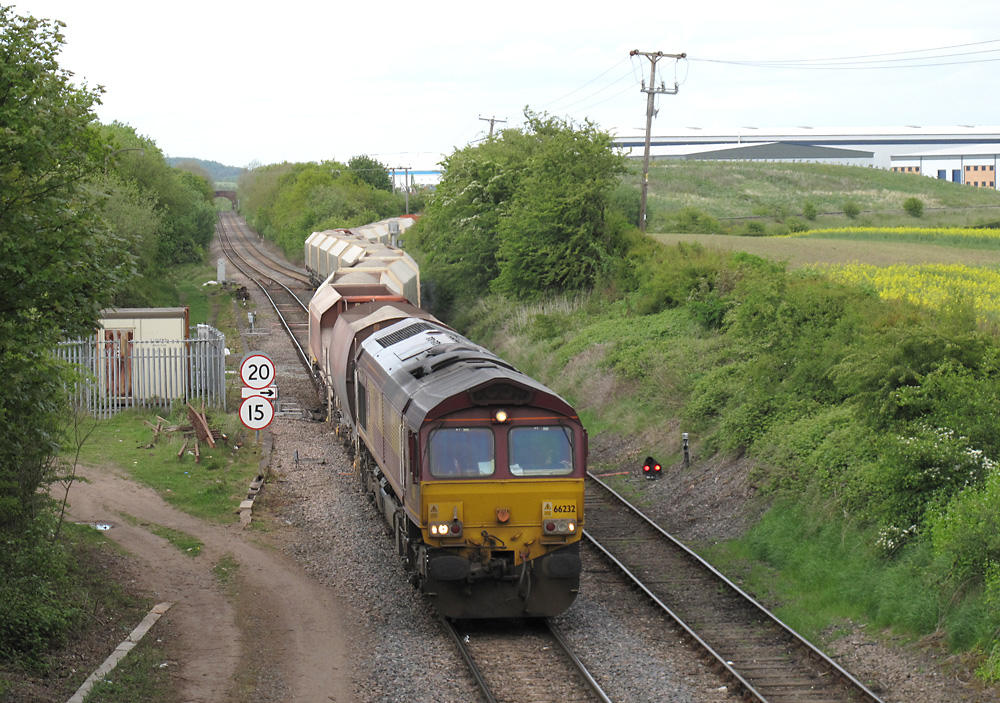
A train loaded with granite chippings from the Markfield Stud Farm quarry at Battleflat, near Bagworth.

Most passenger trains were taken over by diesel units from 14 April 1958, taking about 66 minutes from Leicester to Burton. The passenger service from Leicester to Burton was withdrawn six years later, on 7 September 1964.

The line carries no regular passenger service at present (2022). In 2022 a search in internet train running information showed regular timetabled stone trains from the quarries at Stud Farm.

== Future ==
There have been numerous proposals to reopen the line to passenger trains between Leicester and Burton. A complication is that the northward spur at Knighton Junction, where trains would turn north towards Leicester, has been dismantled, after 6 August 1967, and built over. The line's remaining connection with the Leicester Main Line is at Knighton South Junction, which faces southwards, away from Leicester. Trains between Leicester and the Burton line therefore have to reverse direction at the junction.

Under the Government Restoring Your Railway Fund scheme, the proposed reinstatement of passenger services has advanced to "Ideas Fund 1" in June 2022, at which a Government contribution to a feasibility study is available. At this stage there is little detail about what is formally proposed.

== Locations ==
=== Main line after construction of the deviation ===
- Burton [-on-Trent]; opened 12 August 1839; still open;
- Leicester Junction;
  - Branston Curve from Branston Junction;
- Birmingham Curve Junction;
- Drakelow Power station;
- Bretby Junction; divergence of Bretby Colliery branch;
- Swadlincote Junction; divergence of Swadlincote branch;
- Gresley; opened 1 March 1849; closed 7 September 1964;
- Moira Junction West; divergence of Ashby & Nuneaton Joint Line; divergence of Rawdon Colliery branch;
- Moira Junction; convergence of East Curve from Moira Junction South;
- Moira; opened 1 March 1849; closed 7 September 1964;
- Ashby; opened 1 March 1849; renamed Ashby-de-la-Zouch from 1867; closed 7 September 1964; divergence of Derby line;
- Swannington; opened 1 March 1849; closed 18 June 1951; there was no Swannington passenger station on the L&SR;
- Mantle Lane Junction; convergence of L&SR line from Swannington, 1833–1947;
- Long Lane; opened 27 April 1833; renamed Coalville 1848; renamed Coalville Town 2 June 1924; closed 7 September 1964;
- Coalville Junction; (divergence to Ashby & Nuneaton Joint Line);
- Ashby Road; opened fully 27 April 1833; renamed Bardon Hill 1 January 1847; closed 1 March 1849; reopened 1 September 1849; closed 12 May 1952; divergence of Bardon Hill Colliery and quarry branch;
- Bagworth; open 27 March 1848; renamed Bagworth & Ellistown 1 October 1894; closed 7 September 1964; divergence of Bagworth Colliery Railway;
- Thornton Lane; opened 1850; closed 1 October 1865;
- Merrylees; opened 18 July 1832; closed 1 March 1871;
- Desford Lane; opened 18 July 1832; renamed Desford by 26 April 1833; closed 7 September 1964;
- Desford Junction; divergence of L&SR line to West Bridge;
- Saffron Lane Junction; junction approaching Midland Main Line for divergence to south or north;
- Knighton Junctions.

=== Swadlincote and Woodville lines ===
- Swadlincote; opened 1 March 1849; closed October 1853/January 1855; reopened 1 June 1864; re-sited on extension to Woodville 1 May 1883; closed 6 October 1947 but used for football and summer Saturday trains to 27 October 1962.
- Woodville; opened 1 May 1883; closed 6 October 1947, but summer Saturday use to 8 September 1962.

== See also ==
Burton and Ashby Light Railway
