= Granville Academy =

Location
- Burton Road; Swadlincote, Derbyshire, DE11 7JR; England
- Coordinates: 52°46′34″N 1°32′13″W

Information
- Type: Academy
- Local authority: Derbyshire
- Department for Education URN: 144533 Tables
- Ofsted: Reports
- Executive Principal: M Oliphant
- Staff: 65
- Gender: Co-educational
- Age: 11 to 16
- Enrolment: 702
- Website: http://www.granvilleacademy.co.uk/

Granville Academy, formerly Granville Sports College is a comprehensive school on Burton Road (A511) in Woodville, Derbyshire maintained by the Derbyshire County Council. It is part of the Affinity Learning Partnership. (Formerly The de Ferrers Trust.)

== History ==
Granville received specialised Sports College status in January 2008. The county council was looking at a possible merger between the school and the William Allitt School. but this is no longer on the cards.

The school is near the very busy A511 road, which has been the scene of accidents some involving pupils. The traffic has increased since the Ashby-de-la-Zouch bypass opened in March 2002. Plans by the local council, Derbyshire County Council, aiming to improve road safety were rejected by Granville Academy with a spokesperson for the trust that runs Granville Academy suggesting this was because of "...concerns around site security and the safeguarding of its students".

The current Executive Principal for the school is Mrs M Oliphant and has employed many new members of staff including Gemma Lowe, who has took charge as Principal for the school in Oliphant's absence, in order to cover for the following Pingle Academy's resigned Executive Principal, Mr S Hall in 2025. Making Mrs M Oliphant, Executive Principal of both the Pingle Academy and Granville academy.

== Partner schools ==
Most of the school's students come from Belmont, Eureka, Hartshorne, Springfield, St. Edwards Netherseal and Woodville, primary schools but also accepts some children from Leicestershire into its 830 available places. Some students of the past also attended this school from as far afield as Ticknall Village and staunton harold and the boundary areas near Ashby de-la-Zouch in the past decades especially the 1960s 1970s and 1980s

== Academic performance ==
The school gets very good exam results for Derbyshire at GCSE, with very high results in the region and the highest between the three local schools in Swadlincote. Pingle and William Allit being those other schools. As of 2017, 69% of students achieved grade 4+ (previously grade C and above) at GCSE for both English and Maths. While 6% of students achieving the highest grade 9 (previously grade A**).

== See also ==
- The Pingle Academy
- The De Ferrers Academy
