= Granville Colliery =

Former English coal mine

Coordinates: 52°46′08″N 1°32′56″W

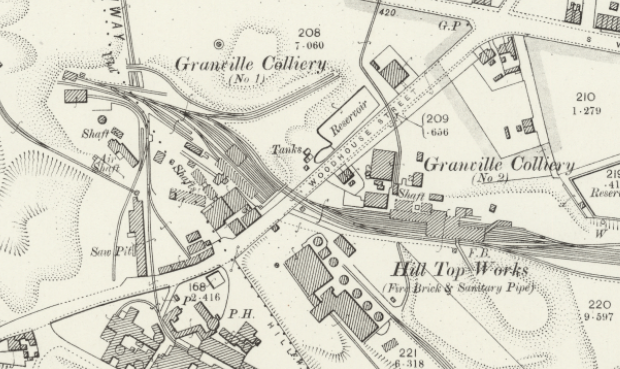
Granville No. 1 and No. 2 collieries on a 1901 Ordnance Survey map

The Granville Colliery was a coal mine in Swadlincote, Derbyshire, England. It has its origins in a nearby mine established in 1780, but mining began on the site of the colliery in 1823. The Granville Colliery Company was founded in 1872 to take over the mine, and the company expanded the works, opening the Granville No. 2 Colliery nearby. Production peaked at 225,000 long tons (229,000 t) of coal in 1891. The two collieries had combined into a single works by 1933 and in 1947 were nationalised under the National Coal Board (NCB). The surface works were closed in 1967 when the underground works were connected with the NCB's Rawdon Colliery in Leicestershire. At least 39 deaths occurred at the mine before 1914, including a 1911 incident in which a man was killed in the explosion of a gunpowder store.

== Origins ==
Granville Colliery has its origins in a colliery opened by Bernard Dewes at the edge of Swadlincote Common around 1780. Dewes died in 1822 and the following year his son Court Dewes Granville began mining at the site of what would become Granville No.1 Colliery. Dewes Granville sank the Common and Church Pits to reach the Main seam (Note: The Leicestershire and South Derbyshire Coalfield was centred around Ashby-de-la-Zouch in Leicestershire but extended northwest to Swadlincote and southeast almost as far as Leicester, covering an area of 17 by 9 miles (27 km × 14 km). Below an extensive clay deposit, containing some poor quality coal, lie a number of seams of coal deposited in layers. The uppermost of these is the 3–4-foot (0.91–1.22 m) thick Dicky Gobler seam, below this are the relatively thin Yard, Little, Cannel and Rider seams. The Main seam was the most important of those mined in South Derbyshire and was 12–16 feet (3.7–4.9 m) thick; after it was exhausted by mining the Woodfield and Stockings (also known as the Two Yard) seams, which lie close together below it, became important sources of coal. Further down, below a hard and thick band of sandstone, lay the Eureka seam and then the Stanhope seam which was often the lowest to be worked in the area. At the lowest worked level before reaching the Wingfield Flags, a thick band of sandstone, lies the Kilburn seam.) of the Leicestershire and South Derbyshire Coalfield. The colliery prospered following the development of nearby canal and railway networks. In 1847 mineral rights were purchased for land adjoining the site at Gresley Common and in 1859 further to the south in Ashby Woulds, allowing expansion of the mine workings.

== Granville Colliery Company ==
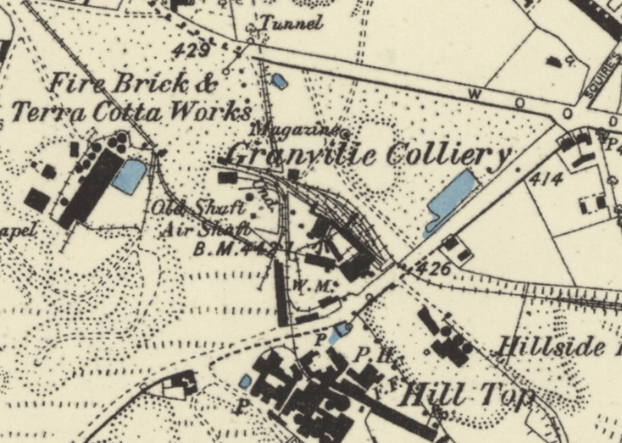
Granville Colliery on an 1885 Ordnance Survey map (based on an 1879-1882 survey)

In 1872 the colliery was sold at auction by the trustees of the estate of Dewes Granville's son, John Dewes Granville. Most or all of the site was purchased by a syndicate of men, mainly from Birmingham, for £75,000 (equivalent to £8,778,713 in 2023). The purchasers incorporated the Granville Colliery Company on 12 July 1872 and proceeded to expand the workings. A new pit to the east was begun in 1887 and designated the Granville No. 2 Colliery. During this time new mineral rights were acquired by the company as the original seams were exhausted; these new seams were at greater depths than before and were more expensive to exploit. The workforce expanded accordingly: in 1888 the company employed 91 surface and 335 underground workers; by the 1890s this had risen to a total of around 600 men and boys. In 1891 the company produced its highest ever output of 225,000 long tons (229,000 t) of coal. In the 1890s the No.1 Colliery worked the Block, (Note: The Block seam was only found in part of the coalfield being much broken and waterlogged.) Little and Main Seams, and No.2 Colliery the Woodfield and Eureka seams.

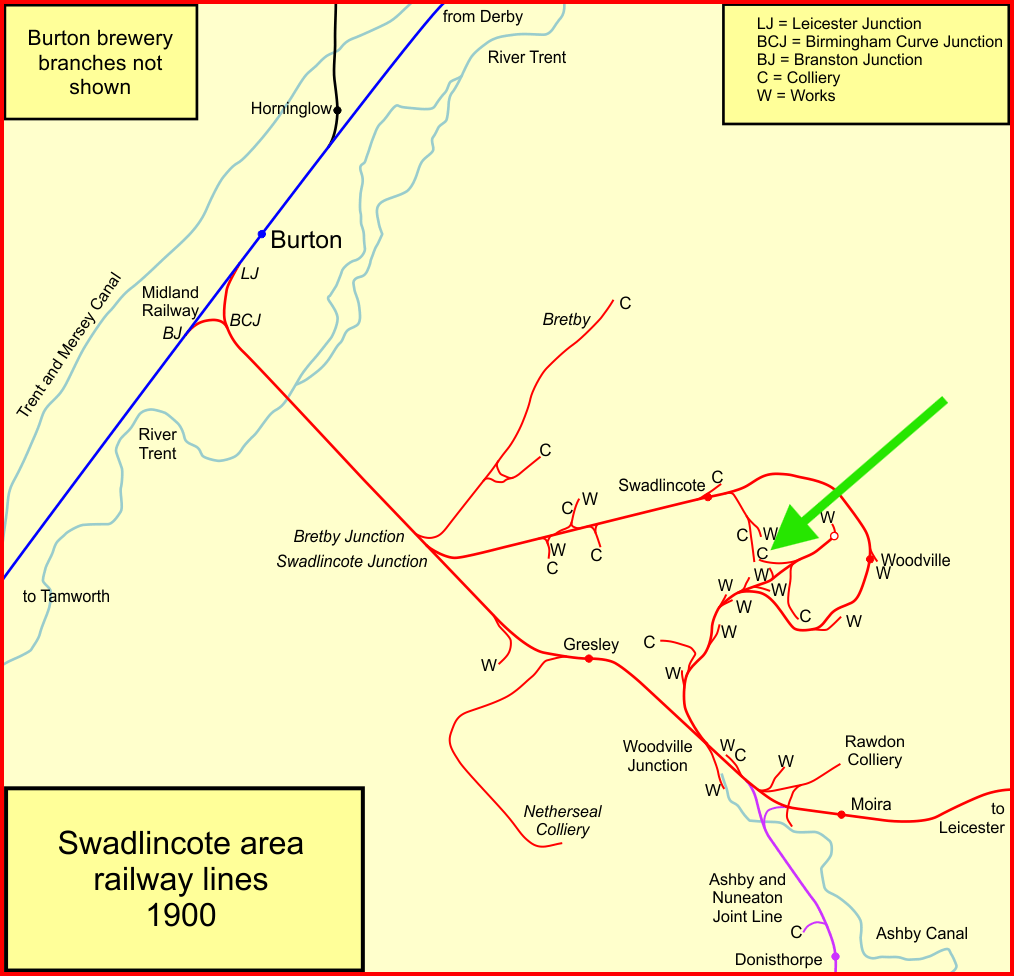
Railway lines around Swadlincote in 1900, with the location of Granville Colliery indicated by the green arrow. Other collieries, including Rawdon and Donisthorpe, can also be seen.

By 1900 the No.1 Colliery had ceased working the Main seam and started on the Cannel seam and No.2 had started to work the Kilburn seam. The Granville Colliery Company also operated the Granville Flour Mill; a nearby fish pond was used to provide a head of water for mine machinery and a discharge for water pumped from the workings. The collieries were connected to a branch of the Midland Railway.

In 1906 the Granville Colliery Company bought the Shoddy Pit, around 1 kilometre (0.62 mi) to the northwest of the No.1 Colliery, for access to additional mining rights. This pit was so named because the workings were liable to flooding and collapse; it had operated for a period as a miners co-operative, but this failed in 1896 after a shaft collapse. The colliery then came into the ownership of Robert Cartwright and Edmund Sharpe (of Sharpe's Pottery) who pumped it out and resumed production, but this venture was liquidated in 1897 and the mining rights purchased by Wraggs, a ceramics company, who also failed to make it profitable.

No. 1 Colliery ceased mining the Little seam in March 1915, as it had been exhausted; that same year No. 2 colliery began working the Stockings seam. By 1933 the two collieries were considered as a single entity and were powered by electricity. In that year the company employed 391 underground and 120 surface workers and worked the Woodfield, Kilburn, Stockings and Yard seams; the colliery also produced fireclay. By 1940 it was working just the Four Foot (Note: This term was used to refer variously to the Dicky Gobler, Little and Block seams.) and Stockings seams and had 315 underground and 138 surface workers. The local member of parliament, Herbert Wragg had become a director by this time. In 1941 the colliery opened a bath and canteen building.

== Nationalisation ==
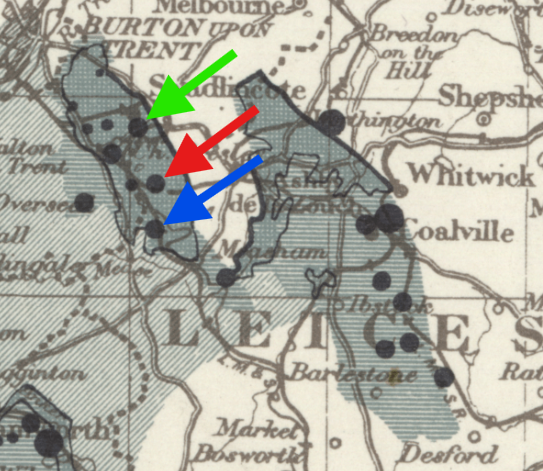
The Derbyshire and Leicestershire coal field on a 1945 map. The Granville Colliery is marked in green, Rawdon in red and Donisthorpe in blue.

Ownership of the colliery transferred to the National Coal Board (NCB) in 1947 under the provisions of the Coal Industry Nationalisation Act 1946. At the time of transfer the colliery employed 384 underground workers and 159 surface workers. The surface buildings were closed in 1967 when the underground workings were connected to the Rawdon Colliery (near to Moira, Leicestershire) which continued in operation under the NCB. The mine later incorporated the Donisthorpe Colliery; the combined workings were the last deep coal mine to operate in South Derbyshire and closed in 1990, by which time they had become uneconomical.

== Incidents ==
The Durham Mining Museum records show that at least 38 men were killed during operation of the colliery. Eleven of these known deaths came before the formation of the Granville Colliery Company and none were during the period of NCB control. The earliest recorded death was in 1852 and the last in 1914.

One death not recorded by the Durham Mining Museum was that of Frank Bodycote (also recorded as Bodicote), who died at 2:10 pm on 24 March 1911 when a gunpowder store exploded. Bodycote was killed shortly after he entered the store with a horse and cart to withdraw explosives for the next week's mining. The explosion knocked down trees in a nearby plantation and was heard in Burton upon Trent, 6–7 miles (9.7–11.3 km) away, where a vibration similar to an earthquake was felt and windows rattled in their frames. Bodycote's body was never found, reported as being "shattered to fragments", but his horse survived with minor injuries despite being thrown high into the air by the blast. A report on the explosion was presented to the Home Secretary who declined to order any further investigation. A new road near to the site of the colliery was named Frank Bodycote Way in 1999.

== Colliery site today ==
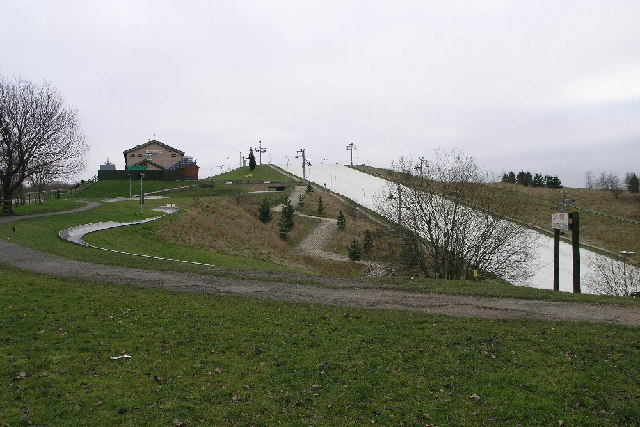
The Swadlincote Ski Centre

In 2018 a memorial lectern was erected on Common Road near where the colliery stood; it notes that the nearby footpaths were used by workers of the colliery as well as the T.G. Green and Mason Cash potteries to travel to their workplaces. Part of the Granville No.1 Colliery site has been redeveloped as a dry ski slope and toboggan run. The site of the No.2 Colliery is now home to light industrial units.
