= Swadlincote =

Town in Derbyshire, England

Coordinates: 52.774°N 1.557°W

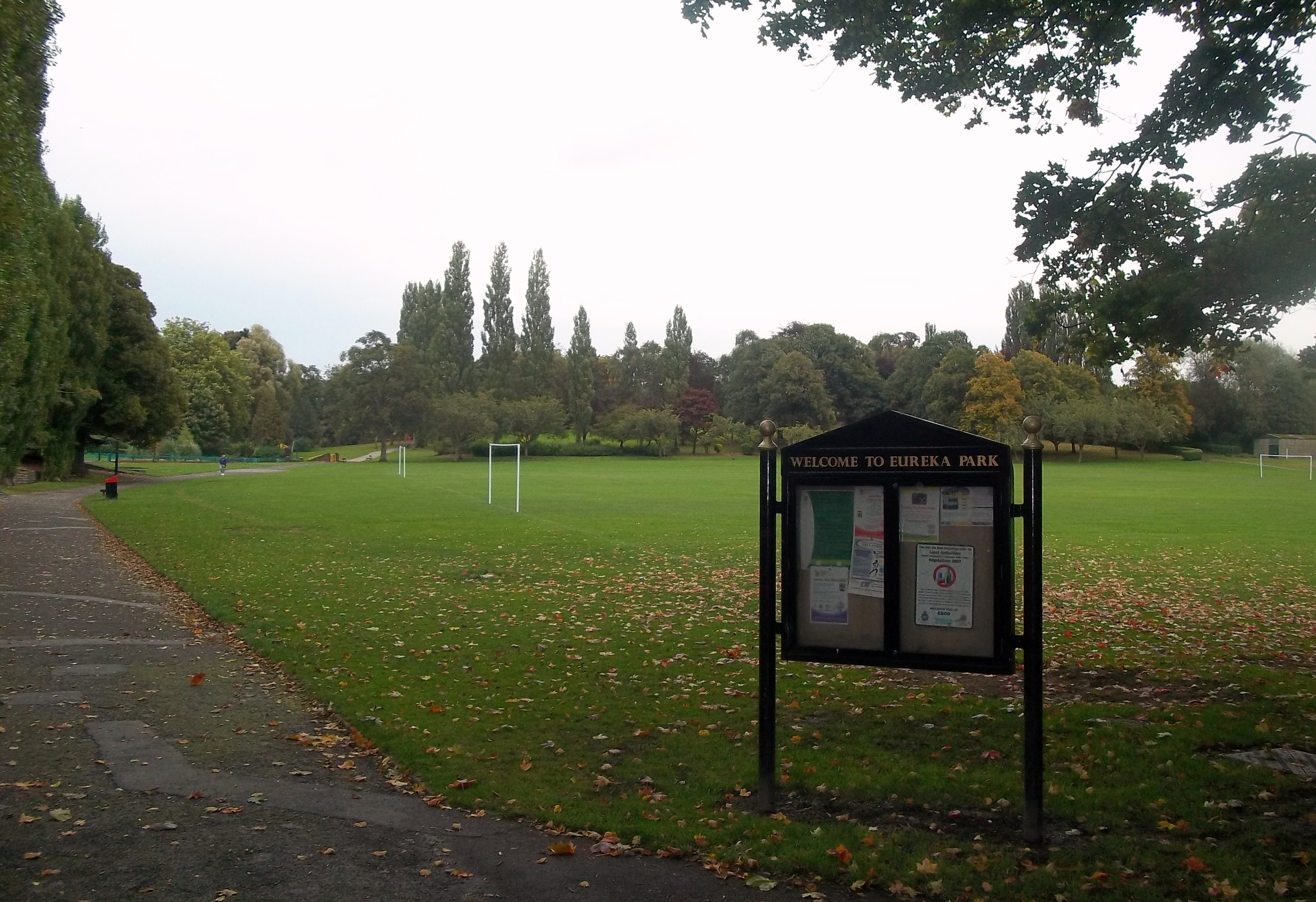
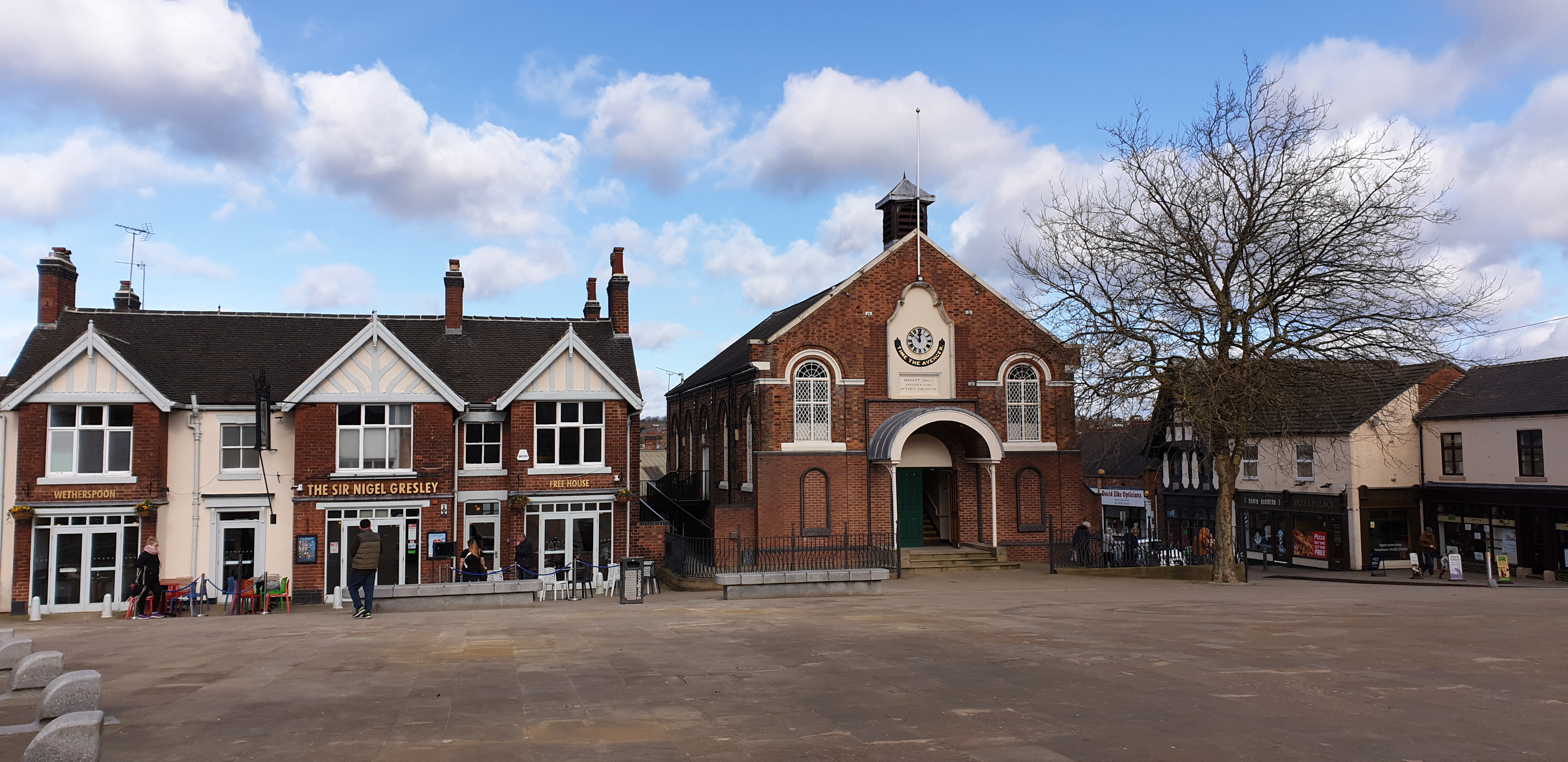
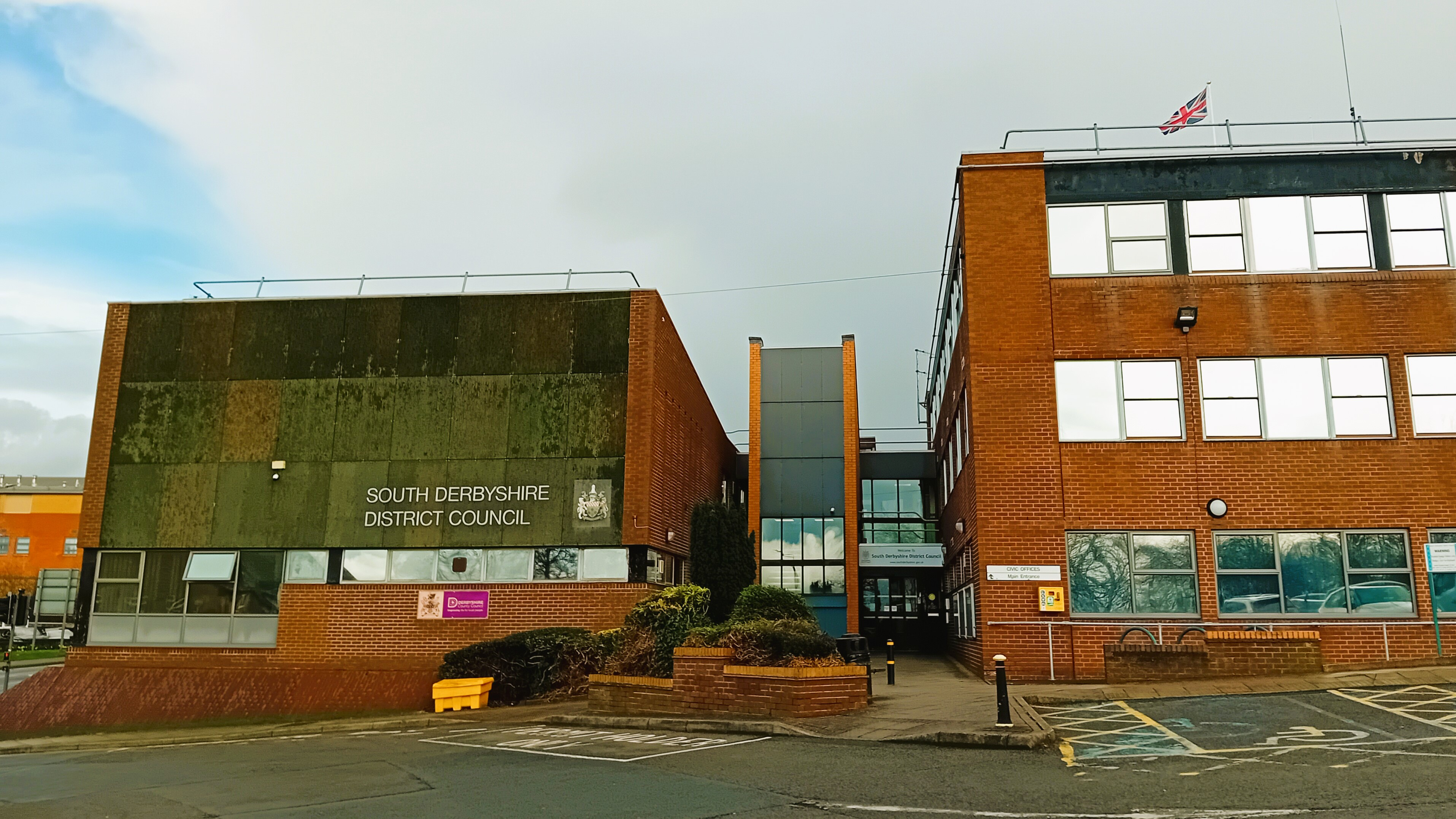
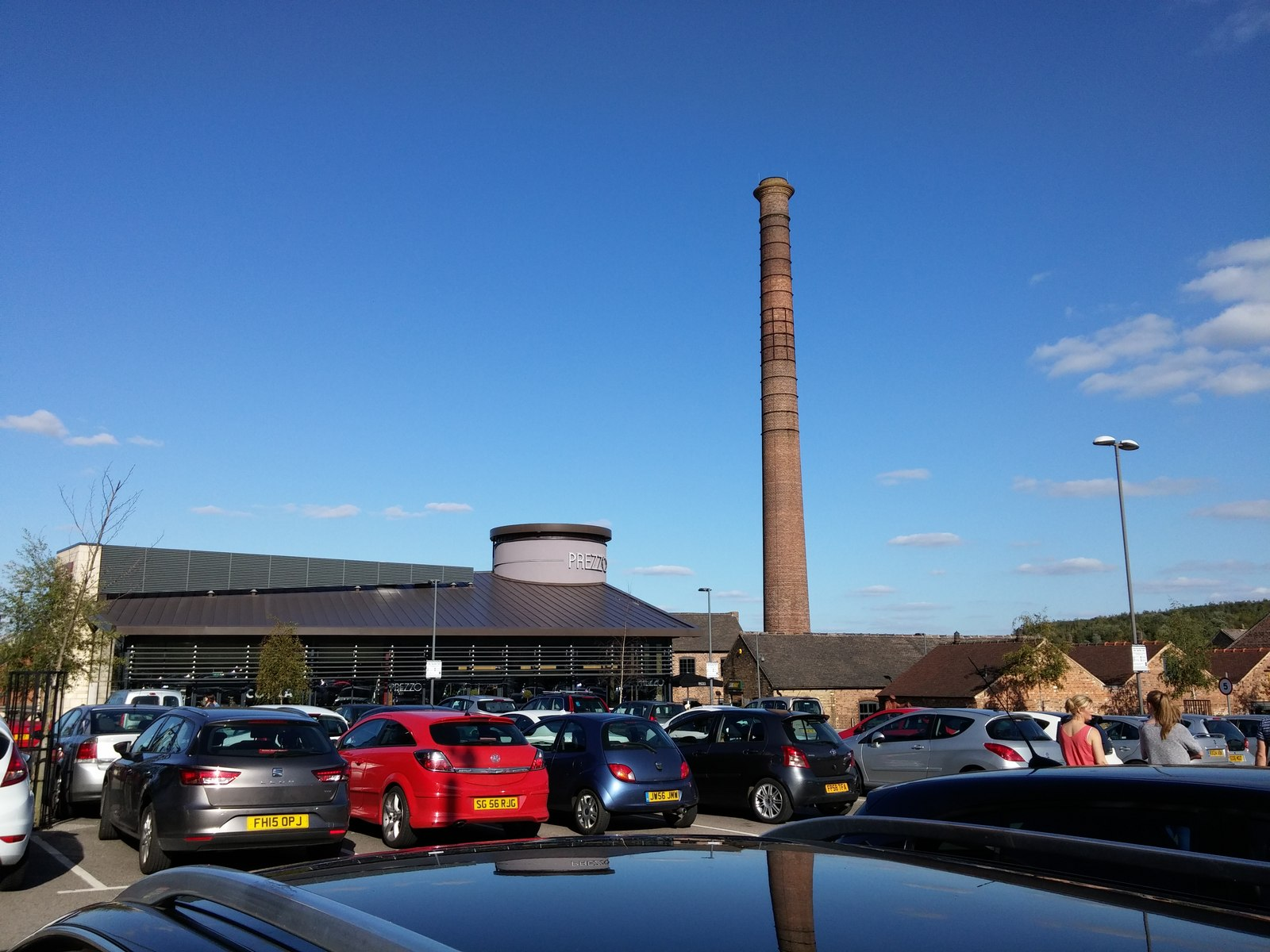
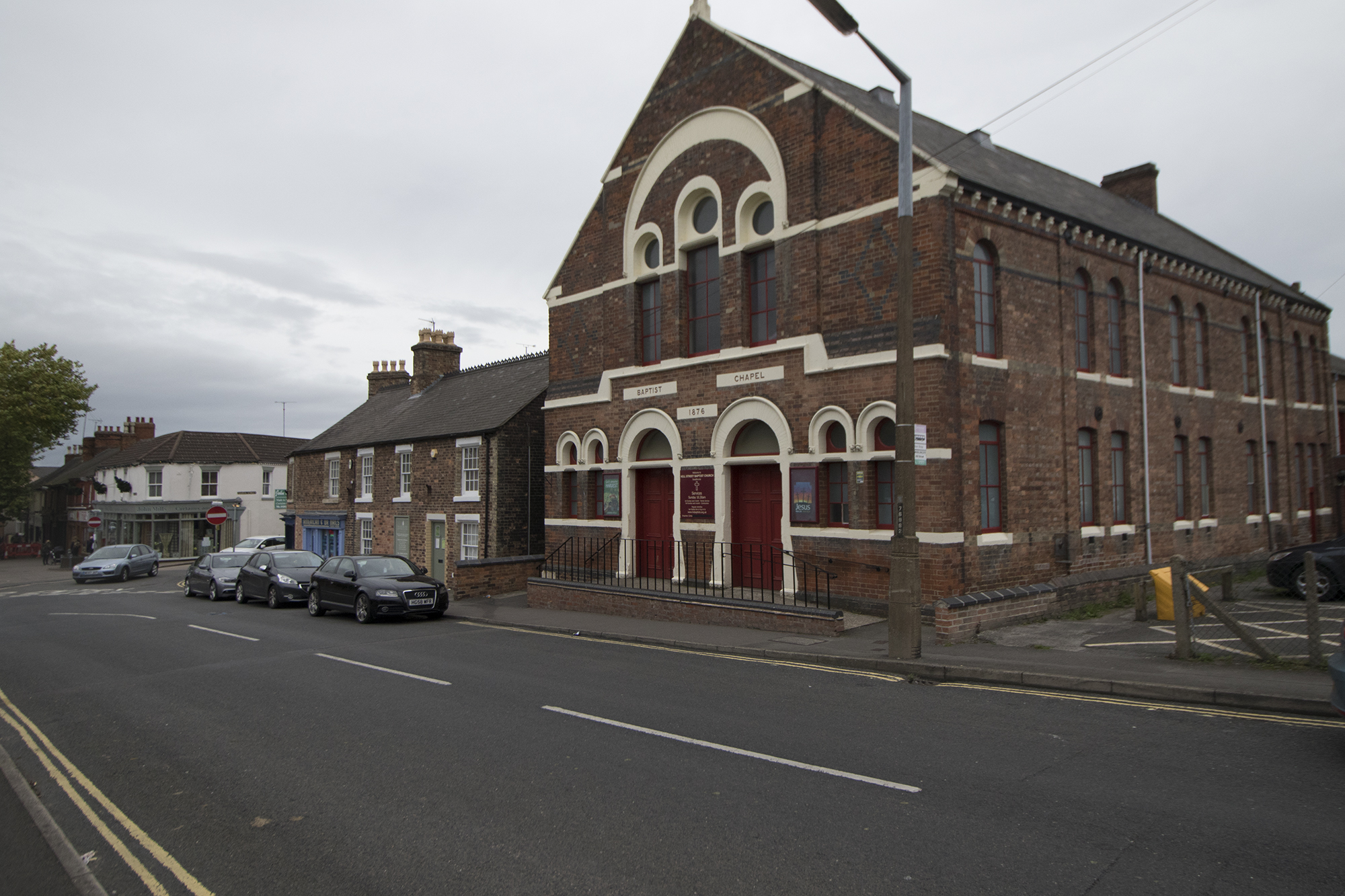
- Clockwise from top: Swadlincote Eureka Park, Civic Offices, Hill Street Baptist Chapel, the Tall Chimney and the town centre with the town hall

- Location within Derbyshire
- Population: 34,576 (2021 Census)
- OS grid reference: SK2919
- Civil parish: Unparished
- District: South Derbyshire
- Shire county: Derbyshire
- Region: East Midlands
- Country: England
- Sovereign state: United Kingdom
- Areas of the town (2011 census BUASD): List: Albert Village (Village); Blackfordby (Village); Boundary (Village); Castle Gresley (Village); Church Gresley (Village); Goseley Dale; Hartshorne (Village); High Cross Bank; Midway; Mount Pleasant; Newhall (Village); Stanton; Town Centre; Woodville (Village)
- Post town: SWADLINCOTE
- Postcode district: DE11
- Dialling code: 01283
- Police: Derbyshire
- Fire: Derbyshire
- Ambulance: East Midlands
- UK Parliament: South Derbyshire

Swadlincote is a historic mining town in the district of South Derbyshire, in the county of Derbyshire, England. It lies within The National Forest area. It borders the counties of Leicestershire and Staffordshire, 5 miles (8 km) southeast of Burton upon Trent and north-west of Ashby-de-la-Zouch and 12 miles (19 km) southwest of Derby. It covers the suburban areas of Church Gresley, Goseley, Midway, Newhall, Oversetts and Woodville and had a population of 34,576 at the 2021 census.

== History ==
Swadlincote's name is derived from the Old English Swartlings Cottas, Swartling being a man's name and cottas meaning cottages. Past forms of the name include Sivardingescote and Swartlincote. Local residents sometimes shorten its name to "Swad".

The Domesday Book of 1086 recorded Swadlincote as a small manor. It was part of the parish of Gresley (latterly Church Gresley) until the 19th century.

The first record of mineral extraction in the area is from the end of the 13th century, but the area remained rural until the industrialisation in the 18th century. The presence of coal and clay in the area led to urbanisation, as collieries (such as the Granville Colliery), brickworks and potteries came to dominate. These industries continued to expand until the Second World War. One traditional bottle-shaped kiln survives in Alexandra Road.

The fire-clay strata in the coal measures has a high alumina content. Swadlincote is one of only six places in Britain with clay deposits of such quality. This makes it particularly suitable for salt glazing. The properties of the clay mean it is easily shaped into pipes that are resistant to sewage. The Public Health Act 1875 created a huge demand for locally produced pipes.

Emmanuel Church of England parish church is a Gothic Revival building consecrated in 1846, designed by Henry Isaac Stevens and completed in 1848. Swadlincote also had a Wesleyan chapel by then. Today the town has also the Roman Catholic church of Saints Peter and Paul designed by the architect George Bernard Cox and completed in 1958.

Swadlincote Town Hall was completed in 1861. The first local-government body for the town was Swadlincote District local board of health, formed in 1871. Its area consisted of three civil parishes: Church Gresley, Stanton and Newhall and Swadlincote. Under the Local Government Act 1894, this became Swadlincote and District Urban District, renamed Swadlincote Urban District in 1951. In 1974 the urban district was merged with Repton Rural District and part of South East Derbyshire Rural District to form the present South Derbyshire District.

Coat of arms of the former Swadlincote Urban District Council

The urban district council was granted a coat of arms in 1947, in a design that reflected how Swadlincote was formed of part of the ancient parish of Church Gresley. Round the edge of the shield was a bordure or border in a "vairy" pattern of red and ermine, from the arms of the Gresley family, who took their name from the parish. The dedication of Gresley parish church to Saint George and Saint Mary was represented by their symbols: a cross and a fleur de lys respectively. The quartered ermine and red field of the shield was taken from the arms of the Stanhope family, Earls of Harrington. The Tudor roses were taken from the arms of Derbyshire County Council. Above the arms was a crest depicting a human arm holding a billet or: a yellow brick for the local brick-making industry. The arm rose from flames, indicative of mining of fireclay and coal. The Latin motto adopted: E terra divitiæ ("Riches from the earth") also referred to the mineral industries of Swadlincote. The current arms of South Derbyshire District Council, which bear the motto "The Earth Our Wealth", and also reflect this heritage.

Throughout the 1950s and 1960s the town's Rink venue (now demolished and the site of industrial units) hosted major British and American pop stars. Gene Vincent appeared on 7 September 1963, and Ringo Starr in 1962, while he was drummer for Rory Storm and the Hurricanes.

== Governance ==
Swadlincote covers four of the 15 wards of South Derbyshire District, returning 12 of the 36 district councillors: Church Gresley (three councillors), Newhall and Stanton (three), Midway (three) and Swadlincote (three). As of the 2023 election, all twelve are Labour Party councillors.

Swadlincote forms part of the South Derbyshire parliamentary constituency. Between 1997 and 2010 its MP was Mark Todd (Labour). In the 2010 general election, the seat was won by the Conservative Party candidate Heather Wheeler, an ex-leader of the Conservative group on South Derbyshire District Council. Labour's Samantha Niblett won the seat from Wheeler in the 2024 general election and serves as the current MP. A notable previous MP is Edwina Currie (Conservative). Until 1983 the area was part of the Belper constituency.

== Geography ==
The town is located within the Leicestershire and South Derbyshire Coalfield. Its landscape is marked by shallow valleys and ridges, shaped particularly by the mining activity which once dominated the area. Swadlincote lies within the National Forest, and there has been significant tree planting around Gresley Common, Swadlincote Woodlands and Church Gresley.

The suburbs of Newhall and Stanton to the north-west lie along the Burton upon Trent and Swadlincote Green Belt, as a curb to development which could have caused Swadlincote to merge with the Winshill and Stapenhill districts of Burton-on-Trent. Most of the green belt lies in Derbyshire, with small tracts in Staffordshire. Hence most of Swadlincote's 21st-century expansion has been to the south and east of the centre, particularly adjacent to Woodville and Church Gresley.

Swadlincote is encircled by several villages and hamlets including Hartshorne, Albert Village, Blackfordby, Overseal, Moira, Linton, Boundary, Norris Hill and Spring Cottage.

== Demography ==
Swadlincote had a population of 34,576 in the 2021 Census.

The town's ethnicity composition was recorded at:

- White - 33,534 (97%)
- Mixed Race - 457 (1.3%)
- Asian - 348 (1%)
- Black - 135 (0.4%)
- Other - 94 (0.3%)

The town's religious composition was recorded at:

- Irreligious - 16,099 (49.5%)
- Christians - 15,968 (49.1%)
- Other - 151 (0.5%)
- Sikhs - 98 (0.3%)
- Muslims - 82 (0.3%)
- Hindus - 67 (0.2%)
- Buddhists - 63 (0.2%)
- Jews - 11 (0.1%)

== Economy ==
The town originally had a prominent manufacturing heritage that made pipes and earthenware. It was the centre of the South Derbyshire coalfield, but mining ceased when Rawdon Colliery closed in 1993. Light manufacturing and service companies are sited on large industrial estates.

Swadlincote has a moderate-sized town centre typical of the Midlands, containing national chain stores and small local businesses. It had a branch of Somerfield before the Co-operative Group took over the chain in 2009. The opening of a large chain supermarket on Coppice Side has been blamed as a factor behind the closure of several small independent shops. The shops that lined West Street and High Street from 1901 had disappeared by the early 21st century. Hepworth Retail Park is a modern development with a restaurant, cinema and various shops.

Plans were announced in 2008 for a new retail complex consisting of a cinema, DIY store and a nationally recognised clothing store. A link road called Sir Herbert Wragg Way has been built, named after the area's mid-20th century Member of Parliament and pipe-yard owner.

A pub bar and restaurant opened on the former Empire Cinema site in April 2007, named The Paramount after Paramount Cars, a manufacturer based in the town in the 1950s. The pub closed in June 2013. Masseys DIY store, which was founded in Swadlincote in 1947, won the 2023 East Staffordshire and South Derbyshire Business Awards.

== Transport ==
Swadlincote is near the junction of the A514 (Derby to A444) and A511 (Burton-upon-Trent to Ashby-de-la-Zouch) roads.

In 1804 the Ashby Canal opened, with its northern terminus at Moira, Leicestershire. Also built were tramways to carry coal and ceramics from Swadlincote and elsewhere to the canal for shipment.

The Midland Railway opened its Leicester to Burton upon Trent Line in 1845, with Gresley railway station to serve the area. It later built a branch with two stations, at Swadlincote itself and neighbouring Woodville. Passenger services on the branch ended in 1947. British Railways closed Gresley in 1964, making Burton-on-Trent the nearest station, 5 miles (8.0 km) away. The Leicester to Burton Line, via Gresley, remains open for goods traffic and in the 1990s there were plans to restart the passenger service as the second phase of Leicestershire's Ivanhoe Line. This plan was shelved after the privatisation of British Rail, and Swadlincote remains one of the UK's largest towns without a railway station.

Swadlincote is served by Arriva Midlands, Arriva Derby, Diamond East Midlands, Bus Link bus companies

Swadlincote is on National Cycle Network Route 63. Though currently under development, it is signed from Civic Way through to Church Gresley via Maurice Lea Park with links onward to the heart of the National Forest.

== Media ==
Television signals can only be received from the Sutton Coldfield TV transmitter which broadcast BBC West Midlands and ITV Central (West). However, BBC East Midlands and ITV Central (East) are also received through cable and satellite television such as Freesat and Sky. Local radio stations are BBC Radio Derby on 104.5 FM, Capital Mid-Counties (formerly Touch FM) on 101.6 FM, Smooth East Midlands on 101.4 FM and Greatest Hits Radio Midlands on 106.0 FM.

== Education ==
Schools in Swadlincote include Granville Academy at Woodville, Mercia Academy (formerly the William Allitt School) at Newhall, St George's School and Pennine Way Junior Academy in Church Gresley, Belmont and Springfield Junior Schools and The Pingle Academy on Coronation Street, which with 1,200 pupils is Swadlincote's largest secondary school.

The closest university is the University of Derby, 18 miles (29 km) to the north, with Staffordshire University's Lichfield campus an equal distance to the south-west.

== Amenities ==
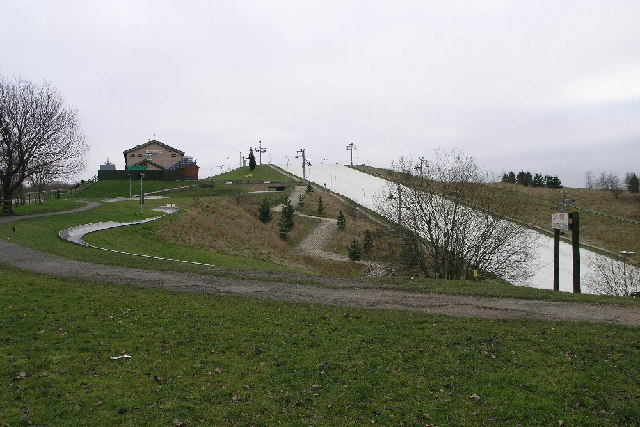
The Ski Slope

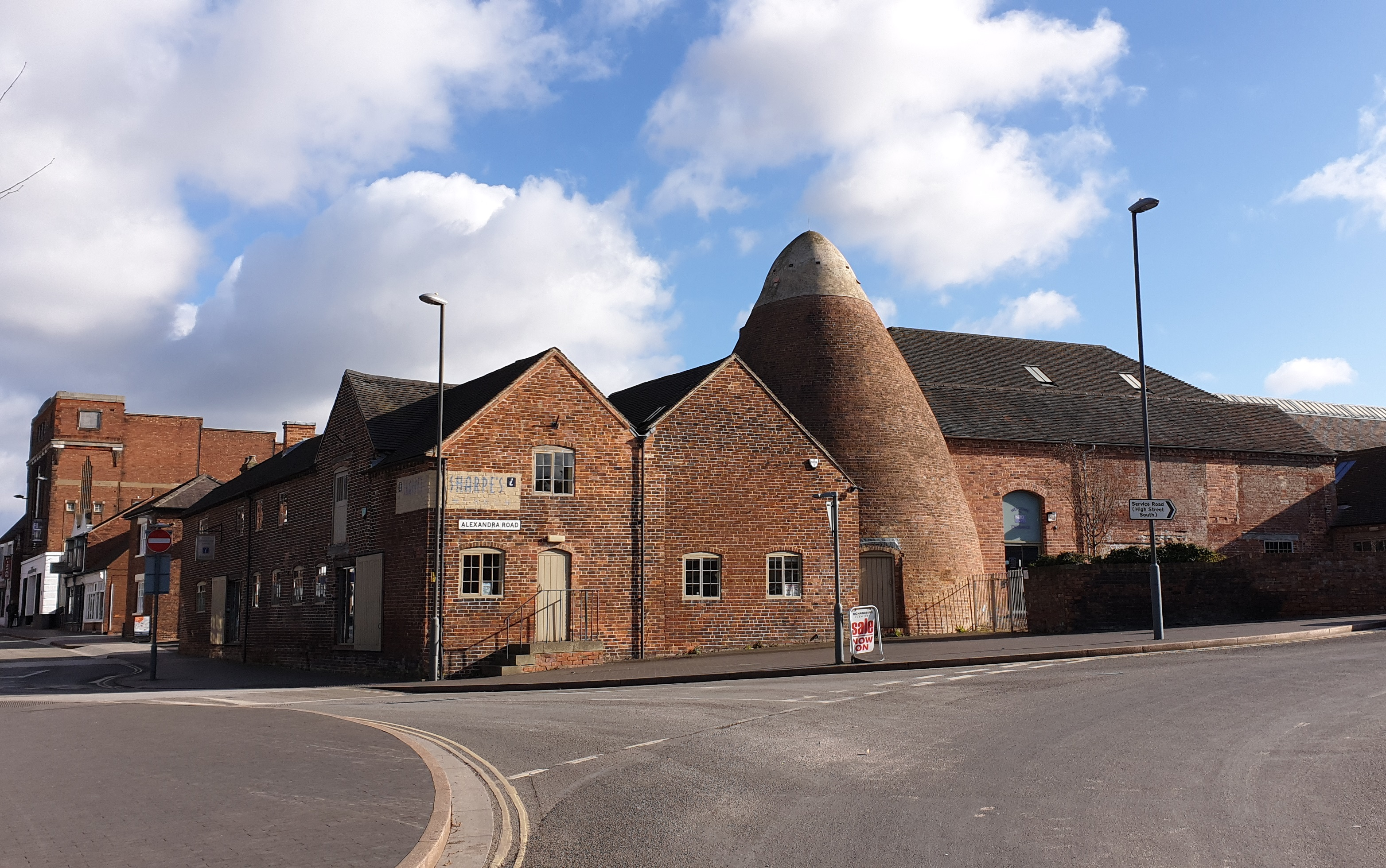
Sharpe's Pottery Museum

The main attractions in Swadlincote are local parks, such as Maurice Lea Memorial Park at Church Gresley, Eureka Park and Cadley Park which have all been awarded Green Flag status. Other amenities include Green Bank Leisure Centre, a large dry ski slope, golf course, library and a '50s American Diner. All are within easy reach of the town centre.

Swadlincote Woodlands Forest Park is an 80-acre site, with more than 40,000 trees, two recreational forest trails and has a number of view points across the town. It is also the proposed site for the Pipeworks arts and media project, a charity-based community theatre and media production facility.

The town's one museum is the Sharpe's Pottery Museum, devoted to the town's ceramic heritage. It contains a café, gift shop of locally produced wares, and The Magic Attic local history archive. The town's Tourist Information Centre is located at 1 High Street.

Local youth organisations include No. 1211 (Swadlincote) Squadron of the Air Training Corps based in Eureka Park.

== Sport ==
Gresley Rovers is a semi-professional association football team based at Moat Street, Church Gresley.

A greyhound racing track existed from 1948 to 1962, it was called the Darklands Sports Stadium and was located off Darklands Lane. The racing was independent (known as a "flapping" track) because it was unaffiliated to the sport's governing body, the National Greyhound Racing Club. The venue was also used for Harness, Pony Racing and Stock Car Racing.

== Accent and dialect ==
The area around Swadlincote has historically had a distinct dialect. It shares terms and pronunciations common in Burton-upon-Trent (West Midlands) and Derby (East Midlands).

Recently, people have been moving to the town from Staffordshire (Tamworth, Rugeley, Lichfield, etc.), who use Swadlincote as a dormitory site, working elsewhere. This West Midlands accent can be heard alongside the traditional one.

== Notable people ==
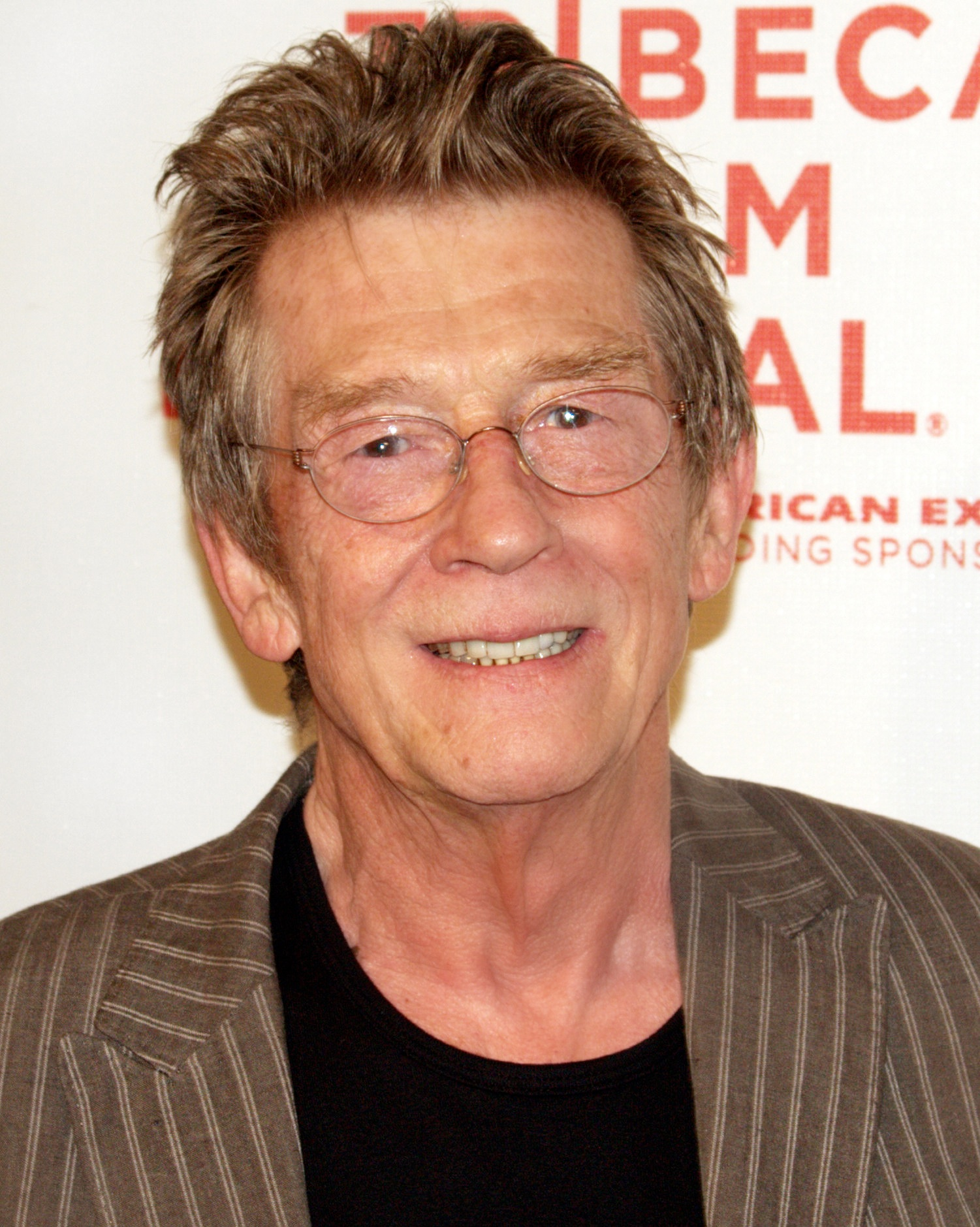
John Hurt, 2009

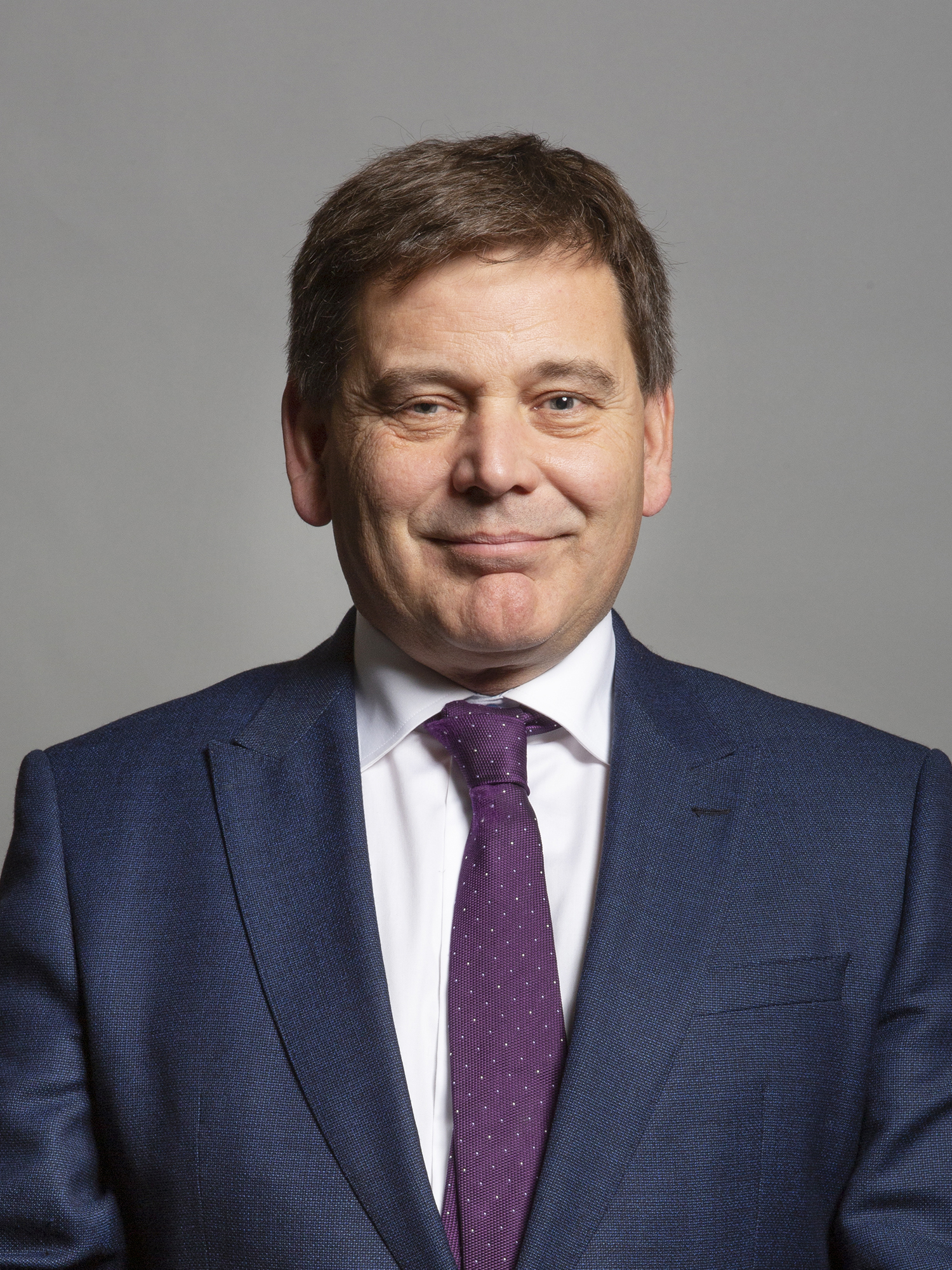
Andrew Bridgen MP, 2019

In birth date order:

- George Stanhope (1660–1728), royal chaplain and promoter of church building, born at nearby Hartshorne.
- Henry Isaac Stevens (1806–1873), architect, designed Emmanuel Church in Swadlincote.
- George Lloyd (1820–1885), archaeologist and cleric, was curate of Church Gresley in the 1860s.
- Helen Allingham (née Paterson, 1848–1926), water colourist and illustrator, was born to a local doctor's family.
- J. Thomas Looney, (1870–1944), scholar who advanced the "Oxford wrote Shakespeare" theory, died locally
- George H. Widdows (1881–1976), schools architect, designed the Grade II listed Springfield Junior School in Swadlincote.
- William Beesley (1895–1966), recipient of the Victoria Cross
- René Cutforth (1909-1984), journalist, TV and radio broadcaster and writer.
- John Hurt (1940–2017), actor, lived in Woodville while aged five to twelve. His father was Vicar of St Stephen's parish church, Woodville, Derbyshire.
- John Bloor (born 1943), owner of Bloor Homes and Triumph Motorcycles Ltd
- Joe Jackson (born 1954), jazz-rock musician and singer-songwriter, spent the first year of his life in Swadlincote.
- Andrew Bridgen (born 1964), politician, MP for North West Leicestershire 2010/2024, attended The Pingle School in Swadlincote.

=== Sports ===
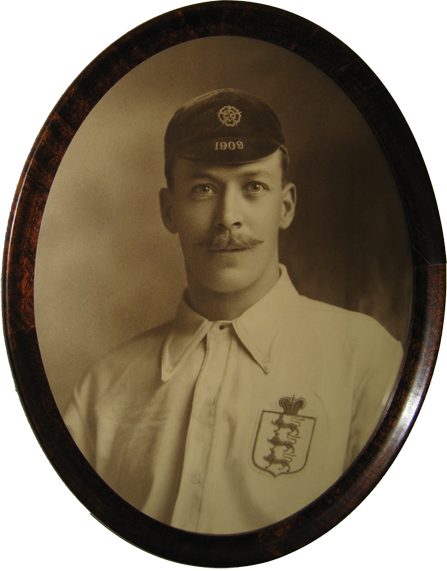
Ben Warren, 1909

- John Hulme (1862–1940), county cricketer, played 142 First-class games, was born in Church Gresley.
- Arthur Archer (1874–1940), footballer, played over 260 games, also for Swadlincote Town FC.
- Ben Warren (1879–1917), England international footballer, played 242 games for Derby County and 22 for England, born in Newhall.
- George Harrison (1892–1939), footballer and publican, played 537 games born and died in Church Gresley.
- Bobby Mason (born 1936), footballer, played 136 games for Wolves, lives in Swadlincote.
- Jack Bodell (1940–2016), British heavyweight boxing champion, was born in Newhall.
- Luke Simpkin (born 1979), is a Swadlincote-based light heavyweight professional boxer.
- Marc Goodfellow (born 1981), footballer, played 235 games, was born in Swadlincote.
- Carl Dickinson (born 1987) is a Swadlincote-born footballer, played 560 games.
- Zach Parker (born 1994) is a professional boxer, was born in Swadlincote.
- Harry Ward (born 1997), professional PDC darts player, was born in Swadlincote.
- Lewis White (born 2000), Paralympic, S9 swimming champion, was born in Swadlincote.
- Owen Eames (born 2006), Derby County footballer, was born in Swadlincote.

== See also ==
- Listed buildings in Swadlincote
- Swadlincote Messiah Choral Society (to follow)

== Sources ==
- Lewis, Samuel, ed. (1931) [1848]. A Topographical Dictionary of England (Seventh ed.). London: Samuel Lewis. pp. 280–283, 338–340.
- Lysons, Daniel; Lysons, Samuel (1817). Magna Britannia. Vol. 5: Derbyshire. pp. 165–172.
- Pevsner, Nikolaus; Williamson, Elizabeth (1978) [1953]. Derbyshire. The Buildings of England. Harmondsworth: Penguin Books. p. 336. ISBN 0-14-071008-6.
