= William Allitt =

British politician and trade unionist

John William Allitt (2 April 1896 – 15 December 1972), known as William Allitt, was a British politician and trade unionist.

Born in Leadenham in Lincolnshire, Allitt's father was a farm worker. He moved to Derbyshire to work for the Burton Co-operative Society, becoming a shop manager. He also joined the National Union of Distributive and Allied Workers, becoming president of its Burton on Trent branch. In 1929, he was elected to Swadlincote Urban District Council (UDC), representing the Labour Party.

At the 1935 UK general election, Allitt stood in Nottingham Central as a joint Labour-Co-operative Party candidate. He took 35.3% of the vote and second place.

Allitt was made a Member of the Order of the British Empire in 1955. In 1959, the William Allitt School (now William Allitt Academy) was named after him. He continued on Swadlincote UDC until the late 1960s, and was knighted in 1966. He later retired to Whitby.
