= Swadlincote railway station =

Former railway station in Derbyshire, England

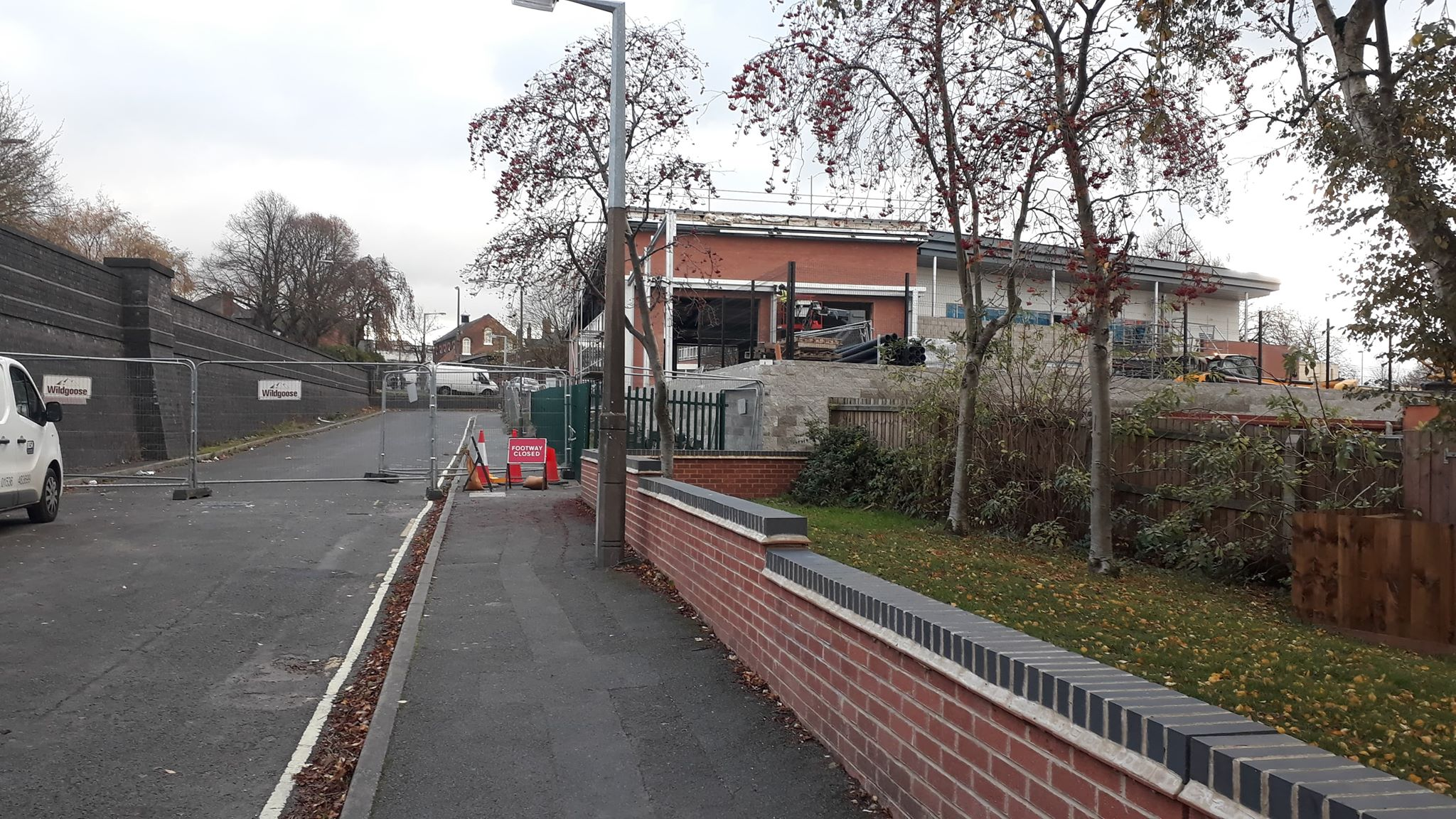
- Swadlincote station site, now occupied by a fire station and the former bridge on the left is all that remains

General information
- Location: Swadlincote, South Derbyshire; England
- Coordinates: 52.775406°N 1.557531°W
- Grid reference: SK299198
- Platforms: 2

Other information
- Status: Disused

History
- Original company: Midland Railway
- Pre-grouping: Midland Railway
- Post-grouping: Midland Railway

Key dates
- 2 October 1851: opened
- 6 October 1947: closed to passenger services
- 1964: closed to freight traffic
Location

Swadlincote railway station was a station that served the town of Swadlincote, South Derbyshire. The station was located off Midland Road near the present day fire station which now occupies the station site. There is also a new build housing estate nearby called "Old Railway Mews".

== Opening ==
The first station to serve Swadlincote was in the nearby Castle Gresley settlement quite a distance from the town. This section was authorised under the Midland Railway (Leicester and Swannington Alteration) Act 1846 and although recorded as opening to passengers in 1851 much of the line had been completed by as early as September 1849.

== Usage ==
The line was more for industrial use for the local mines and collieries but was also used for passenger services with stations at both Woodville and Swadlincote. The through services ran from Leicester West Bridge to Swannington but there were also services to Burton-upon-Trent and Nuneaton.

== Closure ==
The line suffered from the effects of the Second World War, and as a result regular passenger services were withdrawn from the line in 1947, but Summer Saturday service to Blackpool continued until 8 September 1962. The line remained in use for industrial traffic until 1964 when the line was closed and dismantled in 1965.

== Present day ==
Swadlincote railway station site is now occupied by a fire station. The trackbed towards Woodville now a retail park and towards Burton is mostly intact.

Preceding station	Disused railways	Following station
Burton-on-Trent; Line and station closed	Midland Railway; Swadlincote Loop Line	Woodville; Line and station closed

== Map ==
- "Image: LeicesterLine.png, (312 × 438 px)". burton-on-trent.org.uk.
