= Newhall, Derbyshire =

Village in Derbyshire, England

Coordinates: 52.782°N 1.579°W

Newhall
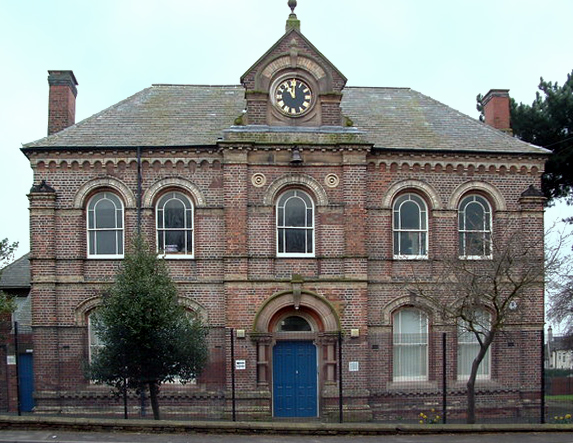
- Newhall Memorial Hall.

- Location within Derbyshire
- Population: 8,060 (2021)
- OS grid reference: SK284206
- District: South Derbyshire
- Shire county: Derbyshire
- Region: East Midlands
- Country: England
- Sovereign state: United Kingdom
- Post town: SWADLINCOTE
- Postcode district: DE11
- Dialling code: 01283
- Police: Derbyshire
- Fire: Derbyshire
- Ambulance: East Midlands
- UK Parliament: South Derbyshire

Newhall is a village in the South Derbyshire district of Derbyshire, England. The village of Stanton and town of Swadlincote are nearby.

== Newhall village ==
It lies between Swadlincote and Burton upon Trent and connected to the A444 to the south and the A511 to the north. To the east is the town of Ashby-de-la-Zouch, very close to the M42 linking Nottingham (Northeast) and Birmingham (Southwest). Burton upon Trent is to the west with the A38 heading south to Lichfield and north for Derby and the M1. Swadlincote is the closest town centre to the village.

There are regular buses linking Burton upon Trent to Ashby-de-la-Zouch (the number 9 Diamond East Midlands or Swadlincote to Burton upon Trent (the 4,8,9,19, Diamond East Midlands) The nearest railway station is in Burton upon Trent.

At one time there were over 60 public houses and off-licences in Newhall. One researcher has listed 37 of them.

In 1971, Newhall was the centre of population for Great Britain. It was first calculated as being at Rodsley in 1901 and has spread south to be at Appleby Magna by the year 2000.

There are two secondary schools, William Allitt Academy, and The Pingle Academy nearby in Swadlincote.

== Stanton and Newhall Parish ==
Stanton is very small and is to the south west of Newhall near the A444. It is clearly separate from Newhall. The Repton parish borders the north, a section of Stapenhill parish is to the northwest, Linton parish is east and south with Church Gresley parish covering a small southern area. Swadlincote Parish is southwest and finally Midway parish links the northeast back up to Repton. Unlike Stanton, Newhall merges into Swadlincote and Midway. Roads define the parish boundaries.

The population is around 7,300 (2001) A similar number for Midway and about a thousand less for Swadlincote.

St John's Anglican Church is just off High Street. Stanton Methodist Church is on Park Road at the junction of the A444. St Peter's and St Paul’s Catholic Church is just inside the Swadlincote parish. High Street becomes Union Road and at the junction of Darklands Road it becomes Newhall Road. It is here also, that St Edward's Catholic Primary School and Catholic Club are found.

== Local government ==
The Newhall and Stanton ward is in the non-metropolitan district of South Derbyshire, and in the county of Derbyshire. In the 2001 census, the Newhall ward, as defined in 1998, had a population of 6,214. In 2005, the ward was renamed Newhall and Stanton, and enlarged slightly, to include more of the Newhall area; at the time of the 2001 census the area covered by the new ward had a population of 6,963.

== Sport ==
A greyhound racing track was opened on Oversetts Road on 10 May 1930. The racing was independent (not affiliated to the sports governing body the National Greyhound Racing Club) known as a flapping track, which was the nickname given to independent tracks. The track also hosted whippets and the main distances for greyhounds was 300 and 500 yards.

== Notable residents ==
- Edwin Bennett (1818–1908), an English American pottery pioneer
- Jean Hanson (1919–1973), Professor of Biology at the University of London, contributed to muscle research

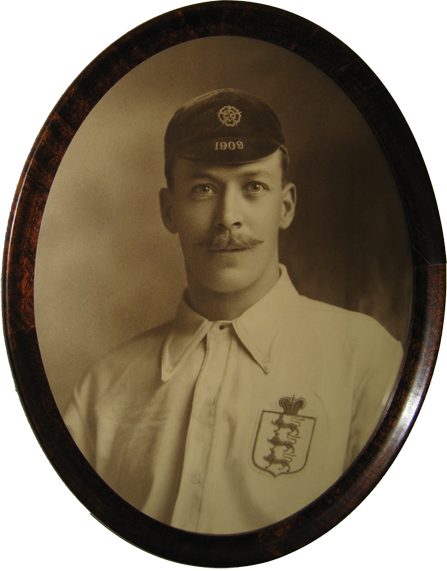
Ben Warren, 1909

=== Sport ===
- Billy Draycott (1869–1943), footballer, played over 170 games, incl. 81 for Newton Heath (became Manchester United)
- Ben Warren (1879–1917), footballer, played 334 games incl. 242 for Derby County plus 22 for England.
- Jack Atkin (1883–1961), footballer, played 308 games for Derby County.
- Harold Webster (1895–1958), a Canadian marathon runner who won gold at the 1934 British Empire Games
- Dan Tremelling (1897–1970), football goalkeeper, played 439 games including 382 for Birmingham City
- Billy Tremelling (1905—1961), footballer, played 323 games including 209 at Preston North End
