= René Cutforth =

British journalist (1909–1984)

René Cutforth (6 February 1909 − 1 April 1984) was a British journalist, television and radio broadcaster and writer.

== Early life ==
Reynolds Cutforth was born at Swadlincote, Derbyshire on 6 February 1909, and spent his childhood in Woodville, Burton on Trent, Staffordshire. He received his formal education at Denstone College, which he entered in September 1922. His first job was a clerk with the Midland Bank. In the Second World War he fought as a commissioned officer with the British Army in Ethiopia, Eritrea and the Western Desert Campaign, where he was taken prisoner in 1941, spending the remainder of the war in prisoner of war camps in Italy and Germany.

== Broadcasting career ==
He joined the British Broadcasting Corporation on return to England in 1946, and became a well known broadcaster and travelled the world as a BBC correspondent. He reported on the Korean War. During his television broadcast career he wrote and produced several documentary series, including, Bird's Eye View (a televisual study of the British Isles from the air) (1969–1971) and The British Empire - Echoes of Britannia's Rule (1972).

Reviewing one of Cutforth's television programmes entitled The Forties Revisited, the critic Clive James wrote in The Observer: "Cutforth is that rare thing, a front man with background. Fitzrovia and Soho weigh heavily on his eyelids. His voice sounds like tea-chests full of books being shifted about".

== Death ==
He died in his 76th year at Great Maplestead, in the county of Essex on 1 April 1984.

== Bibliography ==
- Korean Reporter (1952).
- Reporting (1955).
- Guns Across the Imjin (1958).
- Order to View (1968) (autobiography).
- Later than we Thought - A Portrait of the Thirties (1976).
