= Allitt =

Allitt is a surname, and may refer to the following people:

- Beverley Allitt (born 1968), English serial child killer
- Mary Allitt (1925–2013), Australian cricketer
- Patrick Allitt (born 1956), English historian

== See also ==
- William Allitt Academy in South Derbyshire, England
