= Swadlincote Town Hall =

Municipal building in Swadlincote, Derbyshire, England

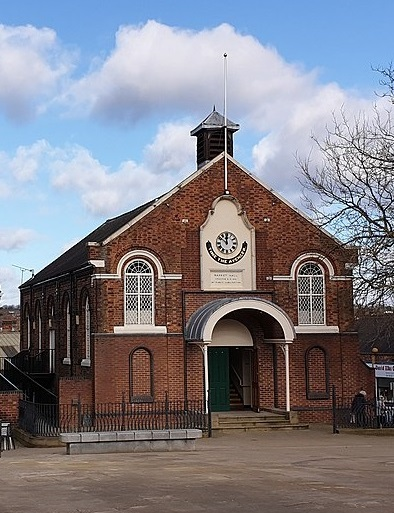
- The building in 2020

- Shown in Derbyshire
- 52.7739°N 1.5576°W
- Location: The Delph, Swadlincote

History
- Built: 1861

Site notes
- Architectural style: Italianate style

Listed Building – Grade II
- Official name: Town Hall
- Designated: 14 October 1981
- Reference no.: 1334526

Swadlincote Town Hall is a municipal building in The Delph in Swadlincote, a town in Derbyshire in England. The building, which serves a community events venue, is a Grade II listed building.

== History ==
The building was commissioned as a market hall and was financed by public subscription in the mid-19th century. The site civic leaders selected was on the north side of the market square, known as The Delph, at the corner of the High Street and Midland Road. It was designed in the Italianate style, built in red brick at a cost of £1,179 and was completed in 1861.

The design involved a symmetrical main frontage of three bays facing onto The Delph. The centre bay featured a portico which originally had a triangular pediment. On the first floor there was originally a brick arch which reached up into the gable above. The outer bays, which were fenestrated on the first floor by round headed latticed windows with archivolts, were flanked by pilasters supporting hood moulds. The side elevations were each fenestrated by five round headed windows which were glazed in a similar style and were also surmounted by hood moulds. Internally, the principal room was a large assembly hall with a stage.

An hour-striking clock, donated Sir Henry William Des Voeux, 3rd Baronet of Caldwell Hall, was installed under the brick arch; the movement was by C. J. Klaftenberger of Regent Street. As des Vouex had been involved in a lengthy and bitter lawsuit in 1865, when he lost the case but became convinced time would prove him correct, he requested that the motto "time the avenger" be inscribed beneath the clock. In the 19th century, the building served as a market hall, while also accommodating petty session hearings one day a month. An open loggia, with iron columns and a glazed roof, was later added to the east side to provide additional space for market stalls. The building also became a significant venue for public meetings: in February 1902, a public inquiry was held there relating to the proposed Burton and Ashby Light Railway.

Following significant population growth in the late 19th century, largely associated with the mining industry, the town appointed a local board of health in 1871. After the local board of health was replaced by an urban district council in 1894, the new council established its offices in the building. The town hall continued to serve as the headquarters of the district council until it established modern council offices behind the town hall by the late 1960s.

In 1981, the building was grade II listed and, in 1984, it was the inspiration for the song "Time the Avenger" on the Learning to Crawl album by the British-American rock band the Pretenders. An extensive restoration project, undertaken in 1985, involved the installation of a porch with a semi-circular canopy supported by iron columns, the replacement of the loggia with four shop fronts on the east side, and the demolition of adjoining public toilets on the west side. The town hall became a licensed venue for marriages and civil partnership ceremonies in March 2012.

== See also ==
- Listed buildings in Swadlincote
