= Woodville railway station (England) =

Former railway station in Derbyshire, England

Woodville (Derbyshire) railway station
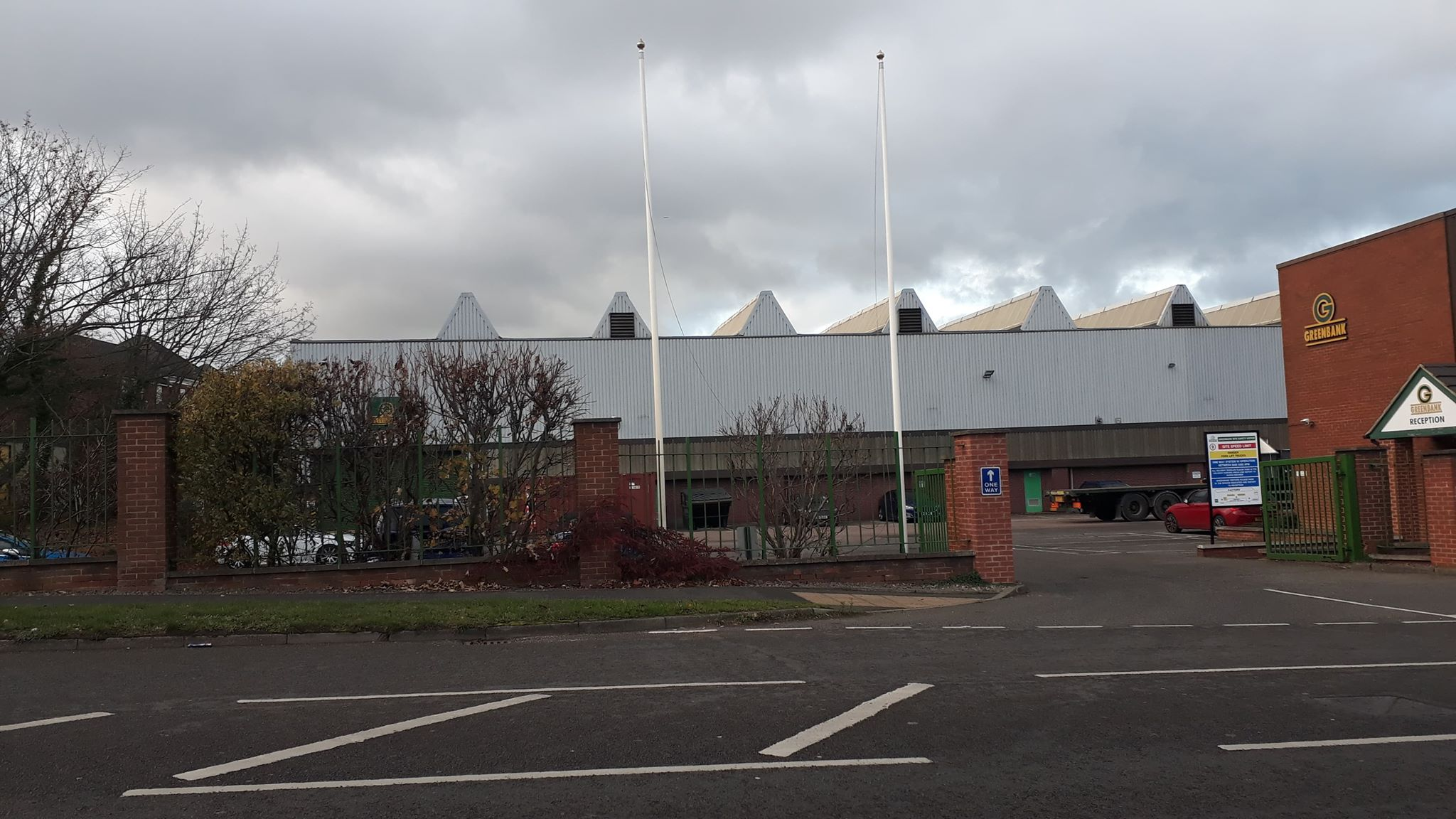
- Site of the station in 2018

General information
- Location: Woodville, South Derbyshire; England
- Coordinates: 52.7683°N 1.5272°W
- Platforms: 2

Other information
- Status: Disused

History
- Original company: Midland Railway
- Pre-grouping: Midland Railway
- Post-grouping: Midland Railway

Key dates
- 1 May 1883: first station opened
- 1884: resited
- 6 October 1947: closed to passenger services
- 1964: closed to freight traffic
Location

Woodville railway station is a former railway station on the Swadlincote Loop Line which served the village of Woodville in Derbyshire, England.

== Opening ==
The first station to serve Woodville was located on the Hartshorne Road. With the opening of the Swadlincote Loop Line a new station was opened further south of the first station which became a goods station. There was also a railway station in the Castle Gresley settlement quite a distance from the village. This section was authorised under the Midland Railway (Leicester and Swannington Alteration) Act 1846 and although recorded as opening to passengers in 1851 much of the line had been completed by as early as September 1849.

== Usage ==
The line was more for industrial use for the local mines and collieries but was also used for passenger services with stations at both Woodville and Swadlincote. The through services ran from Leicester West Bridge to Swannington but there were also services to Burton-on-Trent and Nuneaton.

== Closure ==
Regular passenger services were withdrawn from the line in 1947 but Summer Saturday service to Blackpool continued until 8 September 1962. The line remained in use for industrial traffic until 1964 when the line was closed and dismantled in 1965.

== Present day ==
There is not much evidence left of the Woodville section of Swadlincote Loop Line. It has mostly been built on by housing and turned into footpaths. The original station is now in use for an industrial company. The second station has since been demolished and built on. The trackbed to Moira is traceable but mostly lost under development.

Preceding station	Disused railways	Following station
Swadlincote; Line and station closed	Midland Railway; Swadlincote Loop Line	Moira; Line and station closed

== Map ==
- "Image: LeicesterLine.png, (312 × 438 px)". burton-on-trent.org.uk.
