= Moira Pottery =

Moira pottery works, founded in 1922, was known for its utilitarian stoneware crocks for marmalade and inexpensive pitchers and other kitchen wares, sometimes applied with transfer-printed advertising reproducing quaint turn-of-the-century woodcuts.

== Products ==
The company's "Hillstonia" ware was intended for forcing bulbs and containing plants. Moira pottery was often marked with an oval stamp on the unglazed undersides of its production. The company produced a diverse range including garden ornaments and Vitryware oven-to-table casseroles.

== History ==
The pottery works was situated approximately 5 mi (8 km) from Burton-on-Trent, Staffordshire, although the village of Moira is just over the border in Leicestershire.

The works closed in December 1991. The land was reclaimed and is planted as part of the National Forest.
