= Albert Village =

Village in Leicestershire, England

Coordinates: 52.760°N 1.550°W

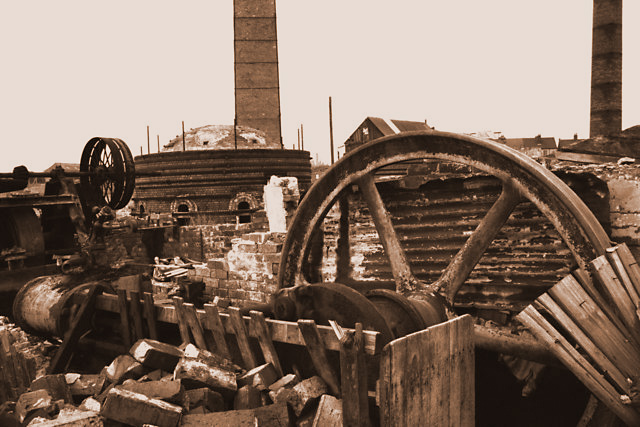
- Mansfield Brothers, Albert Village

- Location within Leicestershire
- OS grid reference: SK303182
- Civil parish: Ashby Woulds
- District: North West Leicestershire
- Shire county: Leicestershire
- Region: East Midlands
- Country: England
- Sovereign state: United Kingdom
- Post town: SWADLINCOTE
- Postcode district: DE11
- Dialling code: 01283
- Police: Leicestershire
- Fire: Leicestershire
- Ambulance: East Midlands
- UK Parliament: North West Leicestershire

Albert Village is a small post-industrial village in Leicestershire, England and is located approximately 1.5 miles (2.4 km) from the town of Swadlincote. The area's heritage is in coal-mining and pottery manufacture, both locally defunct. The National Forest's visitor attraction 'Conkers' is at nearby Moira. The population is included in the civil parish of Ashby Woulds.

== Governance ==
Albert Village forms part of the civil parish of Ashby Woulds, which is part of the district of North West Leicestershire, and forms part of the border with Derbyshire.

== Sport ==
Albert Village also has a children's football team - Albert Village Junior F.C. which caters for boys and girls from the ages of 3–7 years.
