= Harold Webster (runner) =

Canadian long-distance runner

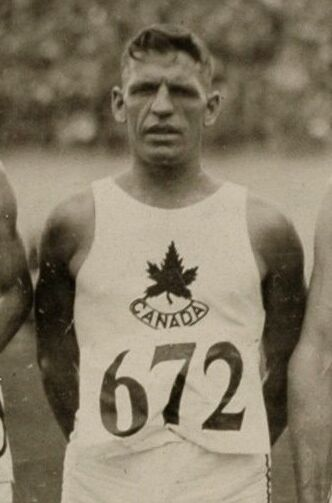

Medal record

Men's athletics

British Empire Games
Gold medal – first place	1934 London	Marathon

Harold Webster (January 18, 1895 – November 7, 1958) was a Canadian athlete who competed in the 1936 Summer Olympics. He was born in Newhall, Derbyshire, United Kingdom of Great Britain and Ireland. In 1936 he participated in the Olympic marathon event but did not finish the race. At the 1930 Empire Games he finished tenth in the 6 miles competition. Four years later he won the gold medal in the marathon contest at the 1934 Empire Games.
