= Listed buildings in Swadlincote =

Swadlincote is a town in the South Derbyshire district of Derbyshire, England. It contains 24 listed buildings that are recorded in the National Heritage List for England. Of these, two are at Grade II*, the middle of the three grades, and the others are at Grade II, the lowest grade. The list contains the listed buildings in the town, and also those in the village of Church Gresley, the wards of Midway, and Newhall and Stanton, and part of the ward of Woodville. The listed buildings include houses and associated structures, farmhouses, churches, former industrial buildings including bottle kilns, a town hall, a showroom and a school.

== Key ==
Grade	Criteria
II*	Particularly important buildings of more than special interest
II	Buildings of national importance and special interest

== Buildings ==
Name and location	Photograph	Date	Notes	Grade
St Mary and St George's Church, Church Gresley; 52.75981°N 1.56692°W		14th century	The church, which incorporates part of the nave of an Augustinian priory, was remodelled in 1786, restored in the 1820s, and restored again in 1872 by Arthur Blomfield who added the chancel. The church is built in stone with a slate roof, and consists of a nave, a north aisle, a north porch, a chancel, and a tower at the west end of the aisle. The tower has three stages, buttresses, a clock face on the south front, and an embattled parapet. The windows in the nave and the aisle are lancets with Y-tracery.	II*
Gresley Old Hall; 52.76404°N 1.57236°W	—	1664	A large house, possibly incorporating earlier material, it has been altered and extended, and used later for other purposes. It is in red brick with stone dressings, and has a tile roof. There is an L-shaped plan, consisting of a front range of two storeys and attics, a rear wing with three storeys and attics, and a lower two-storey wing. The doorway has a lintel and a datestone, and all the windows are 20th-century casements. On the rear wing are large Dutch gables with small pediments, and on the front are two dormers with smaller Dutch gables.	II
The Shrubbery; 52.78539°N 1.60182°W		c. 1800	A house in red brick on a sandstone plinth, with sandstone dressings, a timber eaves cornice and a slate roof. There are two storeys and a symmetrical front of three bays, flanked by single-storey outbuildings linked to the house by curved and ramped walls. The central doorway has a segmental head and a pediment, and the windows are sashes, the window above the doorway with a round-arched head, and the others have painted stone wedge lintels. The outbuildings contain a wide blind arch in which is a shallow-arched doorway. At the rear of the house is a projecting stair tower.	II
Hill Farmhouse; 52.77979°N 1.60643°W	—	Late 18th to early 19th century	The farmhouse is rendered, and has quoins, a floor band, a modillion eaves cornice, and a hipped tile roof. There are two storeys, a symmetrical front of three bays, and two rear wings with half-hipped gables. The doorway is in the centre, and the windows are sashes with channelled stuccoed lintels.	II
Boundary wall, Hill Farmhouse; 52.77970°N 1.60649°W	—	Late 18th to early 19th century	The wall enclosing the garden and running along the road for 40 metres (130 ft) is in red brick with brick coping. The centre portion is ramped up.	II
Midway Farmhouse; 52.78688°N 1.55553°W	—	Late 18th to early 19th century	The farmhouse is in red brick with an eaves band and a tile roof. There are two storeys and attics, a symmetrical front of three bays, and a two-storey rear cross-wing. The central doorway has a quadripartite fanlight, to its right is a square bay window, and the other windows are casements with cambered heads.	II
Parkgate Farmhouse; 52.79080°N 1.56755°W	—	Late 18th to early 19th century	The farmhouse is in red brick with a tile roof. There are two storeys, a symmetrical front range of three bays, and a rear wing. The central doorway has a flat hood, and the windows are casements with cambered heads.	II
The Cottage; 52.77349°N 1.55947°W	—	Late 18th to early 19th century	A house on a corner site in painted brick with an eaves cornice and a tile roof. There are two storeys and two bays. The central doorway has a trellis porch with a tented roof, and the windows are sashes with cambered arches.	II
Bottle Kiln, Hill Top Works; 52.76707°N 1.54815°W		Early 19th century	The bottle kiln is in red brick and has a circular plan. It is tall and broad, and rises above the hipped slate of a pottery factory.	II
Bottle Kiln, Sharpe's Pottery; 52.77283°N 1.55925°W		Early 19th century	The bottle kiln, later part of a museum, is in red brick and has a circular plan. It is conical, and the top is capped.	II
Former Offices, Sharpe's Pottery; 52.77306°N 1.55883°W	—	Early 19th century	The building is in red brick with a hipped slate roof. There are two storeys and an L-shaped plan, with one bay facing the road. In the angle are two doorways with tripartite fanlights, and the windows are sashes.	II
Front range, Sharpe's Pottery; 52.77296°N 1.55918°W		Early 19th century	The building, later part of a museum, is in red brick on a plinth, and has a hipped tile roof. There are two storeys and seven bays. One bay is gabled, and contains a loading door in each floor, and there is another loading door to the left. The windows are fixed and have two or three lights, those in the ground floor with cambered heads.	II
Former Vicarage, St John's Church, Newhall; 52.78255°N 1.56793°W	—	Early 19th century	The former vicarage is in painted brick, on a plinth, with a floor band and a hipped slate roof. There are two storeys and three symmetrical bays. In the centre is a recessed doorway, and the windows are sashes.	II
St John's Church, Newhall; 52.78272°N 1.56857°W		1833	The chancel was added later in the 19th century. It is in red brick, and consists of a nave, a chancel, and a west tower partly embraced by the nave. The tower has three stages, angle buttresses rising to corner pinnacles, and a west doorway with a pointed arch and a hood mould, over which is a window with a pointed arch and hood mould. There are clock faces on all fronts, single-light bell openings, and an embattled parapet. The windows have pointed arches and hood moulds, and there is a large east window.	II
Wood Farm; 52.77336°N 1.53733°W	—	Early to mid 19th century	The farmhouse is in red brick with a tile roof. There are two storeys and attics, and a T-shaped plan, consisting of a symmetrical front range of three bays, and a rear two-storey cross wing. In the centre is a gabled porch, and the windows are sashes.	II
Emmanuel Church; 52.77371°N 1.55196°W	—	1845–46	The church was designed by H. I. Stevens in Early English style. It is built in stone with a slate roof, and has a cruciform plan, consisting of a nave, a west porch, north and south transepts, and an apsidal chancel. The windows are lancets, and at the west end is a triple window.	II
Town Hall; 52.77389°N 1.55757°W		1861	Built originally as a market hall, the town hall is in red brick with an eaves cornice and a slate roof, the front gable coped with kneelers. There is a single storey and a symmetrical gabled front of three bays. Above the central round-arched entrance is a shaped cartouche containing a clock face, an inscription and the date. The outer bays contain panels above which are round-arched windows with lattice glazing and stuccoed moulded impost bands rising over the windows. Along the sides are five similar windows, between which are pilasters, and on the roof is a cupola.	II
Central Methodist Church; 52.78416°N 1.57306°W	—	1863	The chapel is stuccoed and has a slate roof. The north front has two storeys and three bays, with giant pilasters and a pediment with a cornice. In the centre is a gabled porch, the ground floor windows have flat heads and a cornice on consoles, and the upper floor windows are round-headed with a band at impost height. Along the sides are three storeys and four bays, with segmental-arched windows in the bottom floor, round-arched windows in the middle floor and flat-headed windows above.	II
Chimney and former engine house 52.77430°N 1.55527°W		Mid to late 19th century	The former engine house, later used for other purposes, is in red brick, and has a slate roof with stone coped gables. There are two storeys, five bays on the front and three on the sides, and the windows have cambered heads. The chimney has a square plan, and is in red brick with bands of blue and white brick, a heavy cornice, and the letter "M" spelt out in brickwork.	II
Farm buildings, Midway Farm; 52.78713°N 1.55518°W	—	Mid to late 19th century	The farm buildings are in red brick with a tile roof and form an L-shaped plan. At the north is a single-storey building with a half-hipped roof, attached to which is a large gabled wagon arch with a roundel in the pedimented tympanum, and a two-storey building with pitching eyes. Adjoining this is a range at right angles and a wall linking to the farmhouse.	II
Granville Mill; 52.77881°N 1.55189°W	—	c. 1870	The mill is in red brick with bands in black engineering brick and a tile roof. There are three storeys and four bays. Most of the windows have segmental-arched heads, and in the top floor are lunettes. In the centre of the roof is a weatherboarded jettied hoist.	II
Four Bottle Kilns, Greens Pottery; 52.76568°N 1.54870°W		c. 1871	The four bottle kilns are in brick, and of differing designs. They are enclosed and embedded in factory buildings.	II*
Bretby Art Pottery Showroom; 52.76922°N 1.53952°W	—	Early 20th century	The former showroom is in glazed red brick with a tile roof and has a single storey. On the front is a recessed shop window with a flattened elliptical arch, above which is a gable with bargeboards on brick corbels and a finial. To the right is a doorway, over which is a copper strip with lettering in Art Nouveau style.	II
Springfield Junior School; 52.77946°N 1.55689°W	—	1936	The school was designed by George H. Widdows, and is in red brick. There is a V-shaped plan, consisting of a central hall, and splayed classroom wings. The hall has two storeys and a hipped roof, with an arcade of seven round arches, above which are four tall windows, rising to hipped dormers. The hall is flanked by entrance blocks, each containing a round-arched opening. The classroom ranges have hipped roofs with dormers, above the formerly open verandahs, now closed by glass screens.	II
