= Listed buildings in Woodville, Derbyshire =

Woodville is a civil parish in the South Derbyshire and North West Leicestershire districts of both Derbyshire and Leicestershire, England. The parish contains four listed buildings that are recorded in the National Heritage List for England. All the listed buildings are designated at Grade II, the lowest of the three grades, which is applied to "buildings of national importance and special interest". The parish contains the village of Woodville, and the listed buildings consist of a church, a war memorial, and buildings surviving from closed pottery works.

== Buildings ==
Name and location	Photograph	Date	Notes
Bottle kiln 52.76924°N 1.53510°W		Late 18th century	The bottle kiln from the former Bretby Art Pottery is in red brick, with a brick coped top. It has a circular plan, and contains an entrance with a segmental head, and the remnants of an external flue.
Kiln and buildings, Former Escolme Pottery; 52.76607°N 1.53002°W	—	1833	The buildings consist of a bottle kiln, and workshops later used for other purposes. The kiln is in red brick with some blue brick headers, and is circular with a diameter of about 8.5 metres (28 ft) at the base. The top has been removed. The workshops have two storeys and four bays, and a lower wing to the left In the ground floor are two cart entrances and smaller openings. The upper floor contains segmental-headed two-light windows, and in the wing are external timber steps to a pitching door.
St Stephen's Church; 52.76821°N 1.53527°W		1845–46	The church was designed by H. I. Stevens in Norman style, and the aisles were added or rebuilt in 1897. It is built in stone with a slate roof, and consists of a nave, partial aisles, a south porch, an apsidal chancel, a northeast vestry, and a southwest tower. The tower has buttresses, round-arched bell openings, and a pyramidal hipped roof with a weathervane. At the west end is a round-headed doorway with a moulded surround, and the windows have round-arched heads.
War Memorial; 52.76593°N 1.52919°W	—	1925–26	The war memorial, in an enclosure off High Street, is in Cornish granite. It consists of a tall moulded cenotaph surmounted by a Maltese cross, standing on a stepped plinth. On the front is a bronze plaque with an inscription and the names of those lost in the First World War, and on the reverse are the names of those lost in the Second World War.
