= Jane Plant =

British geochemist and author

Professor Jane Anne Plant
- Born: 1 February 1945; Woodville, Derbyshire
- Died: 4 March 2016 (aged 71); Richmond upon Thames
- Education: University of Liverpool (BSc); University of Leicester (PhD)
- Awards: CBE, FREng, FRSE, FRSA
- Scientific career
- Fields: Geochemistry
- Workplaces: British Geological Survey; Imperial College London
- Website: cancersupportinternational.com

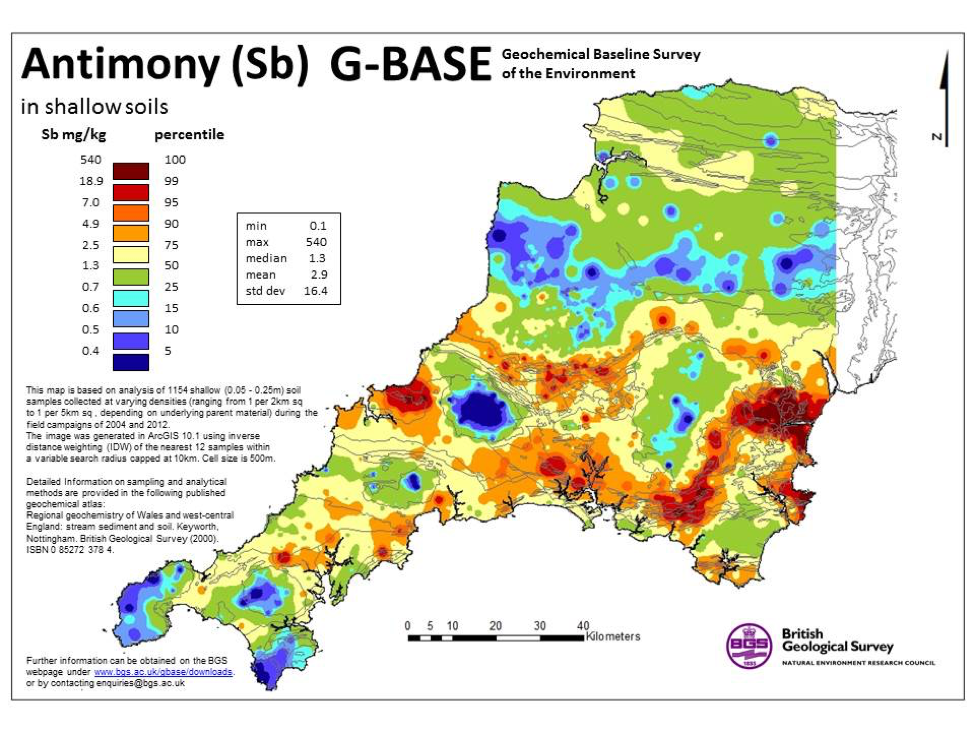
Example of a map created by the G-BASE This map is based on analysis of 1154 shallow (0.05 – 0.25 m) soil samples collected at varying densities.

Jane Anne Plant CBE, FREng, FRSE, FRSA (1 February 1945 – 4 March 2016) was a British geochemist, scientist, and author. Plant was a pioneer in the field of geochemical surveys and environmental surveys. She was Chief Scientist at the British Geological Survey and was a Professor of Geochemistry at Imperial College London. Plant was also highly involved in the Institution of Mining & Metallurgy (now Institute of Materials, Minerals and Mining) where she was involved in many aspects including a role on the Council, and was the first female President of the Institution of Mining & Metallurgy, a post she held from 2001 to 2002. This gave her an extensive network of key connections with government, industry and academia.

Plant was diagnosed with cancer six times and studied the link between dairy and breast cancer. She published several books on the subject.

Plant was appointed a CBE in 1997 in recognition of her contribution to Earth science and industry. She was a British Geological Survey scientist until her retirement from the role of Chief Scientist in 2005. Plant was Emeritus Professor of Geochemistry at Imperial College until her death on 4 March 2016.

== Early life ==
Plant was born in Woodville, Derbyshire, the only child of Ralph and Marjorie (née Langton) Lunn who were village shopkeepers. She attended Ashby de la Zouch Grammar School, from where she went to Liverpool University in 1963. She graduated with first class honours in geology and took the prize for the best degree in her year.

== Career ==
Plant spent most of her career at the British Geological Survey (BGS), and is credited for establishing the ‘Environment and Health’ as significant research. She joined the Institute for Geological Sciences (former name of BGS) in 1967, at the age of 23. There, she led the geochemical reconnaissance programme mapping the presence of elements in Scottish Highlands. She was the first woman to be appointed to a Scientific Officer role rather than in a technical or supporting grade.

She was assigned to the Atomic Energy Section in London, led by Stanley Bowie. She developed methods for a regional geochemical survey in the north of Scotland and was awarded a PhD in 1977 from the University of Leicester for her thesis "Regional Geochemical mapping in Great Britain with particular reference to sources of error".

Plant developed the high-resolution BGS Geochemical Baseline of the Environment (G-BASE) programme to map different chemicals over the land surface by analyzing sediments, ore deposits, soils and water samples. The programme began to broaden and created a geochemical database, which could be applied to economic, health and environmental issues. She applied her maps to health and her findings helped create the field of environmental health, specifically researching Asian and Africa, and was able to study a correlation between a lack of available selenium and heart disease in China.

Her personal influence on the research community was great. After getting her PhD in 1977, she received a special merit promotion in 1983. Along with numerous awards, she was also a member of Royal Commission on Environmental Pollution (1999-2005). Her achievements were recognized by her peers with many awards.

== Cancer research ==
Her research in the environmental geochemical field became more personal in 1993 when she was diagnosed with breast cancer for the sixth time. She noticed the low cancer rate among Chinese women and discovered a correlation between cancer rate and dairy consumption. Her research led to many of the protocols used in today's geochemical mapping projects worldwide.

Plant believed that the link between dairy and breast cancer is similar to that between smoking and lung cancer. She commented that "basically dairy has now got a lot of oestrogen in it because it's common practise to milk pregnant cows, which has driven up the oestrogen content of milk. It also contains tiny proteins called growth factors, and these growth factors directly promote cancer." Plant was concerned about the Insulin-like growth factor 1 (IGF-1) in cow's milk which she argued could increase the risk of breast and prostate cancer. She recommended that cancer patients take conventional treatment but also adopt a dairy-free diet. Plant's dairy-free regime was a plant-based diet that was mostly vegan. She was disappointed that her ideas were not accepted by the medical community but thousands of cancer sufferers were interested in her theories and wrote to her for advice.

Plant's dairy-free diet relied on plant proteins such a soy and was inspired by the eating habits of rural China. She followed this diet for 18 years and remained cancer-free. However, her cancer returned three more times and she blamed these recurrences on becoming lax about her diet. Plant stated that she had strayed from her diet and had a weakness for calves’ livers cooked in butter. Plant died at her home in Richmond upon Thames from a blood clot following chemotherapy.

== Discoveries ==
Along with writing books, Plant took part and co-wrote many scientific reports and papers. One examined the geological problems from the geochemical maps based on sediment samples and found that in the Northern Highlands, the regional variations are related to the position of the basement slices. These are attributed to the lateral variations in sediment composition. Plant found that there are three belts of alpine type ultramafic rocks in the Scottish Highlands. Each of these rocks are associated with a change of sedimentation and structural style.

A more recent article, looked at the relationship between synthetic chemicals and increased pollution in the environment and the impact on both humans and the Earth's ecosystems. An emphasis is placed on the risk perception of radioactivity in society, which is found to be quite dangerous. Plant's article also advocates for the expansion of processes like “biomimicry” and green chemistry to attempt to reduce waste and impact on the environment. She believed the pollution and degradation caused by the population pressure pose a threat to the sustainability of the Earth.

== Awards ==
Plant received many awards:

- 2012: Fellow of the Royal Academy of Engineering
- 2005: A life Fellow of the Royal Society of Medicine
- 2005: Honorary doctorate of the University of Leicester
- 2005: An Honorary Doctor of Sciences degree from Keele University
- 2004: Honorary Doctorate of Åbo Akademi University, Finland
- 2003: An Honorary Doctor of Sciences Degree from Kingston University for services to Environment and Earth Sciences
- 2002: Fellow of the Royal Society of Edinburgh
- 2001: Honorary Doctorate of the University of Exeter, for services to Earth Sciences
- 2000: Fellowship of the Royal Society of Arts
- 1999: Freeman of the City of London
- 1999: Lord Lloyd of Kilgerran Award of the Foundation for Science and Technology for the application of science and technology for the benefit of society
- 1997: CBE (Commander of the Order of the British Empire) for Services to Earth Sciences
- 1997: Honorary Doctorate of the Open University (for academic and scholarly distinction)
- 1985: The Murchison Fund of the Geological Society

== Selected publications ==
- Your Life In Your Hands – Understanding, Preventing And Overcoming Breast Cancer by Jane Plant (2000)
- The Plant Programme by Jane Plant and Gill Tidey (2001)
- Understanding, Preventing And Overcoming Osteoporosis by Jane Plant and Gill Tidey (2003)
- Prostate Cancer – Understand, Prevent And Overcome by Jane Plant (2004)
- Eating for Better Health: The Plant Programme by Jane Plant and Gill Tidey (2005)
- Beating Stress, Anxiety, and Depression by Jane Plant and Janet Stephenson (2008)
- Pollutants, Human health, and the Environment edited by Jane Plant, Nick Voulvoulis, and K. Vala Ragnarsdottir (2012)
- Beat Cancer: How to Regain Control of Your Health and Your Life by Mustafa Djamgoz and Jane A. Plant (2014)

== See also ==
- Timeline of women in science
