= St Stephen's Church, Woodville =

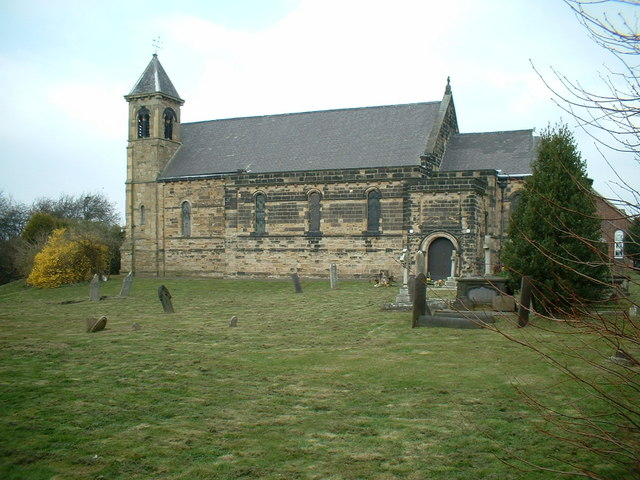
- St Stephen's Church, Woodville
- St Stephen's Church, Woodville
- 52°46′3.68″N 1°32′9.82″W
- OS grid reference: SK 31448 19056
- Location: Woodville, Derbyshire
- Country: England
- Denomination: Church of England

History
- Dedication: St. Stephen the Martyr
- Consecrated: 8 December 1846

Architecture
- Heritage designation: Grade II listed
- Architect: Henry Isaac Stevens
- Groundbreaking: 7 November 1845
- Completed: 1846

Specifications
- Length: 65 feet (20 m)

Administration
- Province: Canterbury
- Diocese: Leicester
- Archdeaconry: Lougborough
- Deanery: North West Leicestershire
- Parish: Woodville

St Stephen's Church, Woodville is a Grade II listed parish church in the Church of England in Woodville, Derbyshire.

== History ==
The desire for a church in Woodville was first expressed at a meeting on St Stephen's day in 1843, and this prompted the construction of the church, and the dedication was selected based on the day of that initial meeting.

The church was built on a one-acre plot of land given by Barbara Rawdon-Hastings, Marchioness of Hastings to the designs of the architect Henry Isaac Stevens. The corner stone was laid on 7 November 1845 by Richard Curzon-Howe, 1st Earl Howe, in the presence of Hon. Capt. Curzon and the Rev. Marmaduke Vavasour. Transept arches were built into the walls to provide for any future enlargement. The apse was laid with Minton black, buff and red encaustic tiles.

It was consecrated by the Bishop of Peterborough, Rt. Revd. George Davys on 8 December 1846.

== Parish status ==
The church is in a joint parish with

- St Margaret's Church, Blackfordby

== Organ ==
A pipe organ was built by Albert E Pease. A specification of the organ can be found on the National Pipe Organ Register.

== See also ==
- Listed buildings in Woodville, Derbyshire
