= Leicestershire and South Derbyshire Coalfield =

Coal mining region in England

Coordinates: 52.77°N 1.55°W

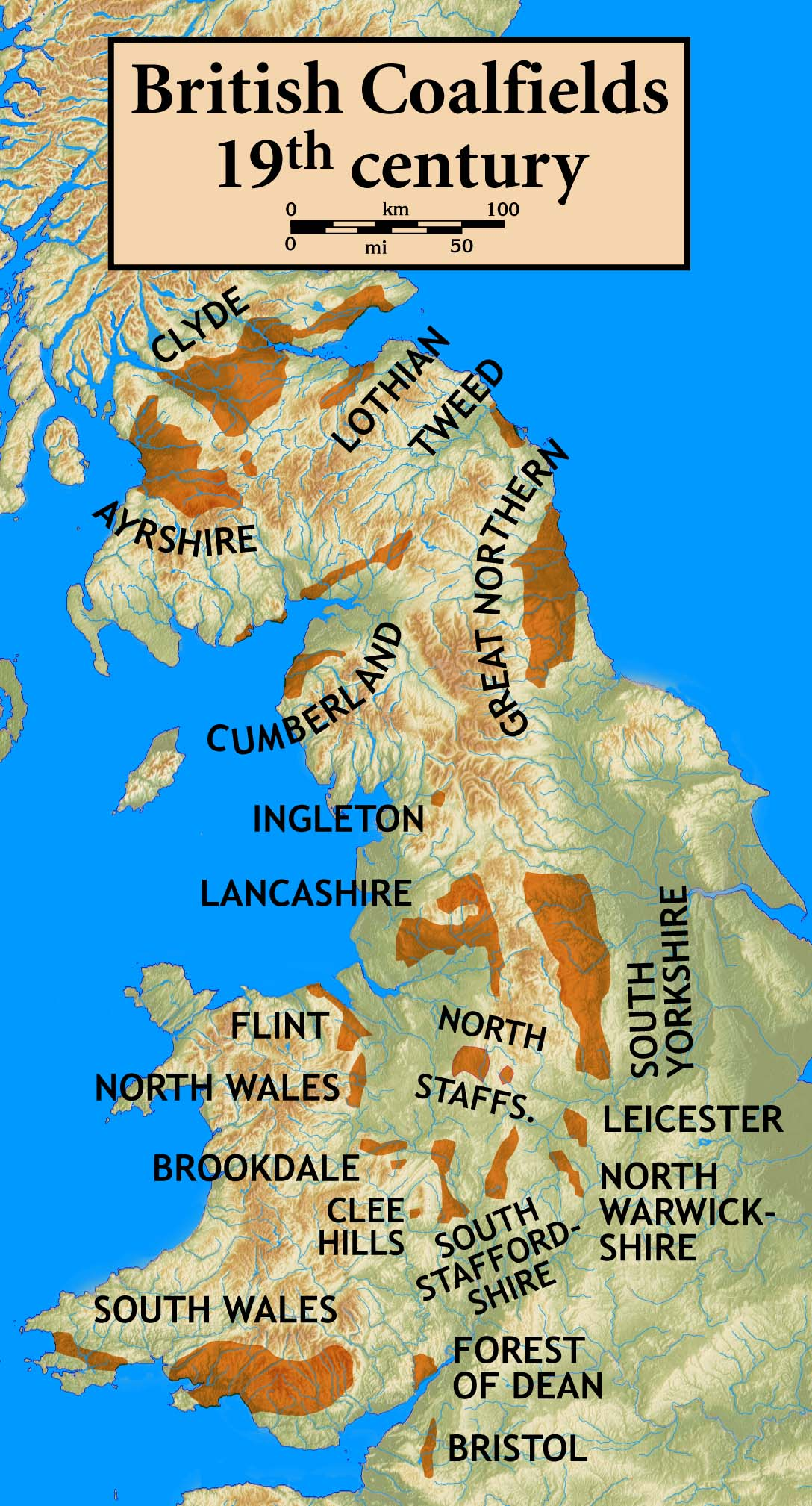

The Leicestershire and South Derbyshire Coalfield in the English Midlands is one of the smaller British coalfields. The two areas are sometimes separately referred to as the South Derbyshire Coalfield and the Leicestershire Coalfield. All of the worked coal seams are contained within the Lower and Middle Coal Measures which are of Upper Carboniferous age.

== Geology ==
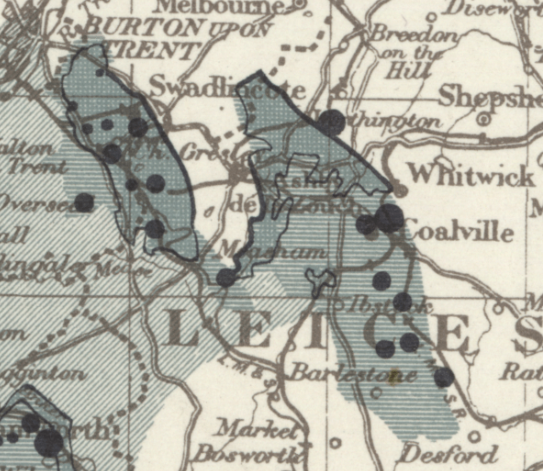
The coalfield shown on a 1945 Ordnance Survey map.

The following seams are recognised in South Derbyshire:

Middle Coal Measures
- Ell
- Dicky Gobler
- Upper Kilburn
- Block
- Yard
- Two Foot
- Upper Cannel
- Little
- Little Kilburn

Lower Coal Measures
- Rider
- Main
- Little Woodfield
- Lower Main
- Woodfield
- Stockings
- Eureka
- Joyce's
- Upper Stanhope
- Lower Stanhope
- Well
- Twelve Inch
- Clod
- Kilburn
- Norton
- Hardbed Band
- Belperlawn

A series of seams referred to as P12, P15/16, P17, P25, P27, P31 (Derby), P33, P34 and P39/40 are recorded above the Upper Kilburn seam in the southern part of the South Derbyshire Coalfield.

In the Leicestershire area, the following are recognised;

Middle Coal Measures
- Excelsior
- Minge
- Five Foot (or Five Feet)
- Splent
- Threequarters
- New Main Rider
- New Main (Slate)
- Swannington Yard
- Cannel

Lower Coal Measures
- High Main
- Upper Main (Main)
- Smoile
- Upper Lount
- Middle Lount
- Nether Lount
- Yard
- Low Main (Roaster)
- Lower Main Upper
- Lower main Lower
- Clod
- Kilburn

== Collieries in the nationalisation era ==
As per the Northern Mine Research Society

=== Derbyshire ===
- Stanhope Bretby (closed 1966)
- Bretby (closed 1962)
- Cadley Hill (closed 1988)
- Thorntree Drift (closed 1947)
- Swadlincote (closed 1965)
- Granville (merged with Rawdon 1967)
- Netherseal (closed 1947)

=== Leicestershire ===
- Church Gresley (merged with Rawdon 1967)
- Reservoir (closed 1948)
- Rawdon (merged with Donisthorpe 1986)
- Donisthorpe (as Donisthorpe-Rawdon, closed 1990)
- Oakthorpe (closed 1950)
- Measham (merged with Donisthorpe 1985)
- New Lount (closed 1968)
- Calcutta (closed 1950)
- Whitwick (closed 1986)
- Snibston No. 2 (closed 1984)
- South Leicester (merged with Bagworth 1983)
- Ibstock (closed 1950)
- Ellistown (merged with Bagworth 1986)
- Nailstone (merged with Bagworth 1967)
- Bagworth (as Bagworth-Ellistown, closed 1991)
- Desford (closed 1984)
- Merry Lees (merged with Desford 1966)
- Asfordby (closed 1997)
