= Ben Warren (English footballer) =

English footballer

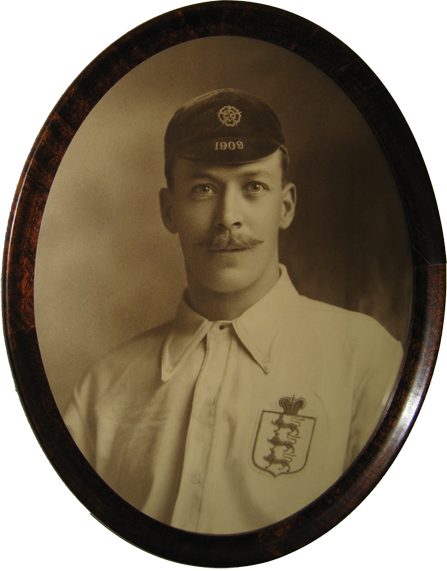

Personal information
- Full name: Benjamin Warren
- Date of birth: 7 May 1879
- Place of birth: Newhall, Derbyshire, England
- Date of death: 15 January 1917 (aged 37)
- Place of death: Mickleover, England
- Height: 1.73 m (5 ft 8 in)
- Position: Half-back

Senior career*
Years	Team	Apps	(Gls)
1899–1908	Derby County	242	(19)
1908–1911	Chelsea	92	(4)
Total		334	(23)

International career
1906–1911	England	22	(2)
- * Club domestic league appearances and goals

Benjamin Warren (7 May 1879 – 15 January 1917) was an England international footballer who played as a half-back for Derby County and Chelsea.

Born in Newhall, Derbyshire, Warren began his playing career with Derby County, whose secretary-manager had spotted him playing in a junior match. Playing at half-back, though he could also fill in at inside forward, Warren was known for his hard but fair tackling, and for his consistent performances. He scored eight goals in seven FA Cup matches to help Derby reach the semi-finals of the competition in 1902; he also helped Derby reach the final a year later, though they lost 6–0 to Bury. He emerged as one of England's highest-rated half-backs, winning his first cap against Ireland in 1906. He made 242 Football League appearances for Derby, scoring 19 goals.

Warren signed for David Calderhead's Chelsea in July 1908 and made his debut against Preston North End. He retained his place in the England side, but once again the closest he came to success with a club was in the FA Cup, playing in every game for Chelsea en route to the semi-finals in 1911, where they lost to Newcastle United. In 101 matches, he scored five goals for Chelsea. After making his England debut, he played in the next 19 matches for his country, a run only ended by injury, and finished his career with 22 caps and 2 goals, one of which came during England's first overseas tour.

A knee injury sustained while playing for Chelsea in a 4–1 win over Clapton Orient ended Warren's career and led to a decline in his mental health. Faced with a long lay-off, and with a young family to support in the days before footballers were well-paid, Warren suffered a mental breakdown and began to be plagued by hallucinations and delusions he was being poisoned; by 1912 he had been admitted to a lunatic asylum in Mickleover, Derbyshire. His condition deteriorated to such an extent that he was placed on suicide watch. He died of tuberculosis while still an inmate of the asylum in 1917.

He left a widow, Minnie, and four children, Harry, Lily, (Benjamin) Maurice and Grenville. Harry Warren also became a footballer and later a manager. He was one of the most successful managers that Southend United had.
