= Ashby Woulds =

Civil parish in Leicestershire, England

Coordinates: 52.74897°N 1.534996°W

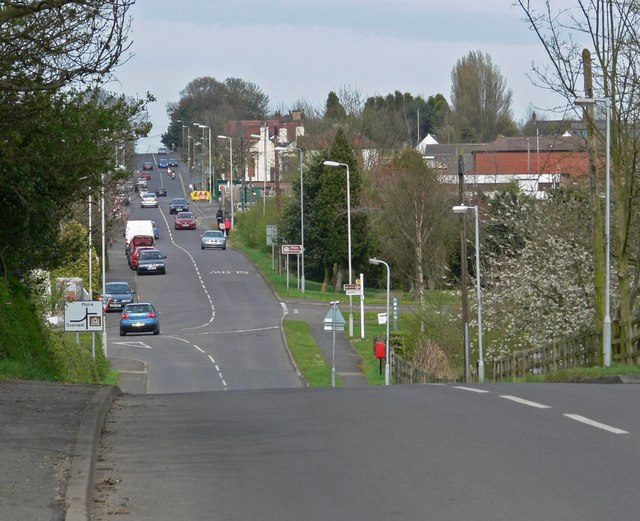
Shortheath Road in Moira

Ashby Woulds is a civil parish with a town council in Leicestershire, England. The population (including Albert Village) at the 2011 census was 3,763. It is in the North West Leicestershire district, to the west of Ashby de la Zouch. The main settlements in the parish are Moira and Norris Hill.

Until 1974 the parish was an urban district of Leicestershire.

== See also ==
- Ashby Woulds Heritage Trail
- Albert Village
