= Woodville, Derbyshire =

Village in Derbyshire, England

Coordinates: 52.769°N 1.533°W

Woodville
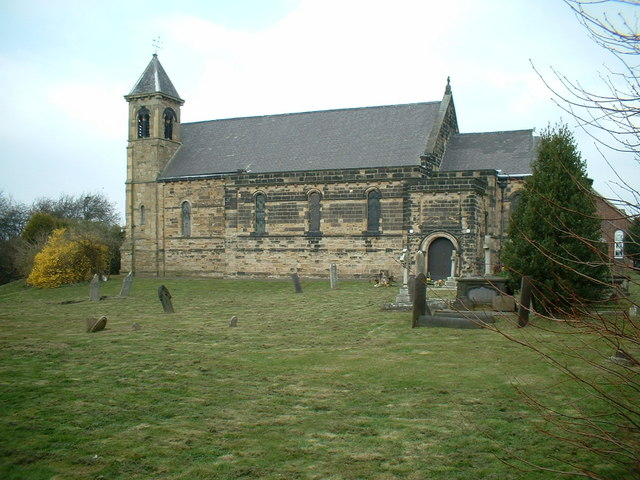
- Parish Church of St Stephen the Martyr, Woodville

- Location within Derbyshire
- Population: 5,161 (2011)
- OS grid reference: SK3119
- Civil parish: Woodville
- District: South Derbyshire; North West Leicestershire
- Shire county: Derbyshire; Leicestershire
- Region: East Midlands
- Country: England
- Sovereign state: United Kingdom
- Post town: Swadlincote
- Postcode district: DE11
- Dialling code: 01283
- Police: Derbyshire
- Fire: Derbyshire
- Ambulance: East Midlands
- UK Parliament: South Derbyshire and Leicestershire

Woodville is a large suburban village and civil parish that crosses two districts - South Derbyshire district of Derbyshire and North West Leicestershire district of Leicestershire, England, 2 miles (3.2 km) east of Swadlincote. At the 2011 Census, the parish had a population of 5,161, an increase from 3,420 at the 2001 Census. The centre of the village, known as the Tollgate, is a busy traffic island on the A511. Woodville forms part of the border with Leicestershire.

== History ==
A Measham Bargeware Teapot showing the original name of Woodville as 'Wooden Box'

Woodville was formerly known as Wooden Box, named after the wooden toll booth on the toll road between Ashby de la Zouch and Burton-upon-Trent.

The area around the roundabout, which is the modern equivalent of the toll booth, is still known as 'Tollgate'. The name Woodville first appeared in a leaflet issued when the foundation stone of the Church of England parish church of St Stephen was laid on 7 November 1845. St Stephen's is a Norman revival building designed by Henry Isaac Stevens and completed in 1846.

The Woodville area is rich in industrial heritage with a wide variety of industries such as potteries, crate-making, pipe works, breweries, rope-making and railways all having had a presence in the area which is now either totally gone or extremely diminished.

One of the most famous Woodville potteries was Bretby Art Pottery, founded in 1882 by Henry Tooth and William Ault.

== Local geography ==
On some approaches it is difficult to tell where the village starts and ends as it is increasingly contiguous with neighbouring Swadlincote and Albert Village.

On the northern edge of Woodville is the Goseley district which was constructed during the 1950s. There has been much development of the surrounding area with large private estates of new homes having been constructed, including the ‘Bird’ district.

To the south of Woodville, along the county border with Leicestershire, a large community of new houses is being developed (unofficially referred to as Woodville Woodlands) by the developers Bloor Homes and Bryant Homes. This development is built on the land of the former Woodville Pipe Works and incorporates the planting of new trees on the former fire clay pit as part of the National Forest scheme.

The Mount Pleasant works operated by John Knowles & Company, demolished in 1993, produced pottery and has been replaced by a housing development. A discovery by archaeologists led to the preservation of some of its records.

Off Hartshorne Road is the site of the former Woodville railway station which opened in 1851 and connected the village with Swadlincote, Ashby and Burton-Upon-Trent but the station closed in 1947 and the line in 1964. The site is now an industrial estate.

== Amenities ==
Woodville High Street (which is part of the A511 road) has a small shopping area incorporating a convenience store, a pharmacy and a fish and chip shop. Also located on the High Street side of the road are additional food outlets, including a Chinese takeaway, a further fish and chip shop, and Indian and Chinese restaurants.

There is a village post office together with further shops and light industrial and commercial units.

Woodville has a 24-hour petrol station, incorporating a convenience store, and a tyre and exhaust centre which is located on the Tollgate roundabout.

Woodville has a Scout Group.

Woodville has an infant school and a Church of England Junior School. Both schools are off the High Street.

One of Woodville's oldest businesses is Masseys DIY store which was established in 1947 and still remains on Swadlincote Road in Woodville.

== Sport ==
Woodville Rangers Football Club was founded in 2005 and caters for all age groups from four to adult. Their nickname is The Tollers after the famous toll gate which was situated in Woodville for many years. The club badge shows the toll house. Woodville Rangers gained FA Charter Standard status early in 2008.

A short lived greyhound racing track called the Victory Greyhound and Whippet Racing Track was opened during October 1929 at the Woodville Cricket Ground on the Burton Road. The racing was independent (not affiliated to the sports governing body the National Greyhound Racing Club) and was known as a flapping track, which was the nickname given to independent tracks. The venue usually raced on Saturdays and regularly attracted over 1,000 people despite being so close to Swandlicote Greyhound Stadium. A second season of racing was held in 1930 but there is no evidence of anything beyond 2 May 1930.

== Industrial heritage ==
Woodville Beehive kiln, Archaeological Investigations Ltd

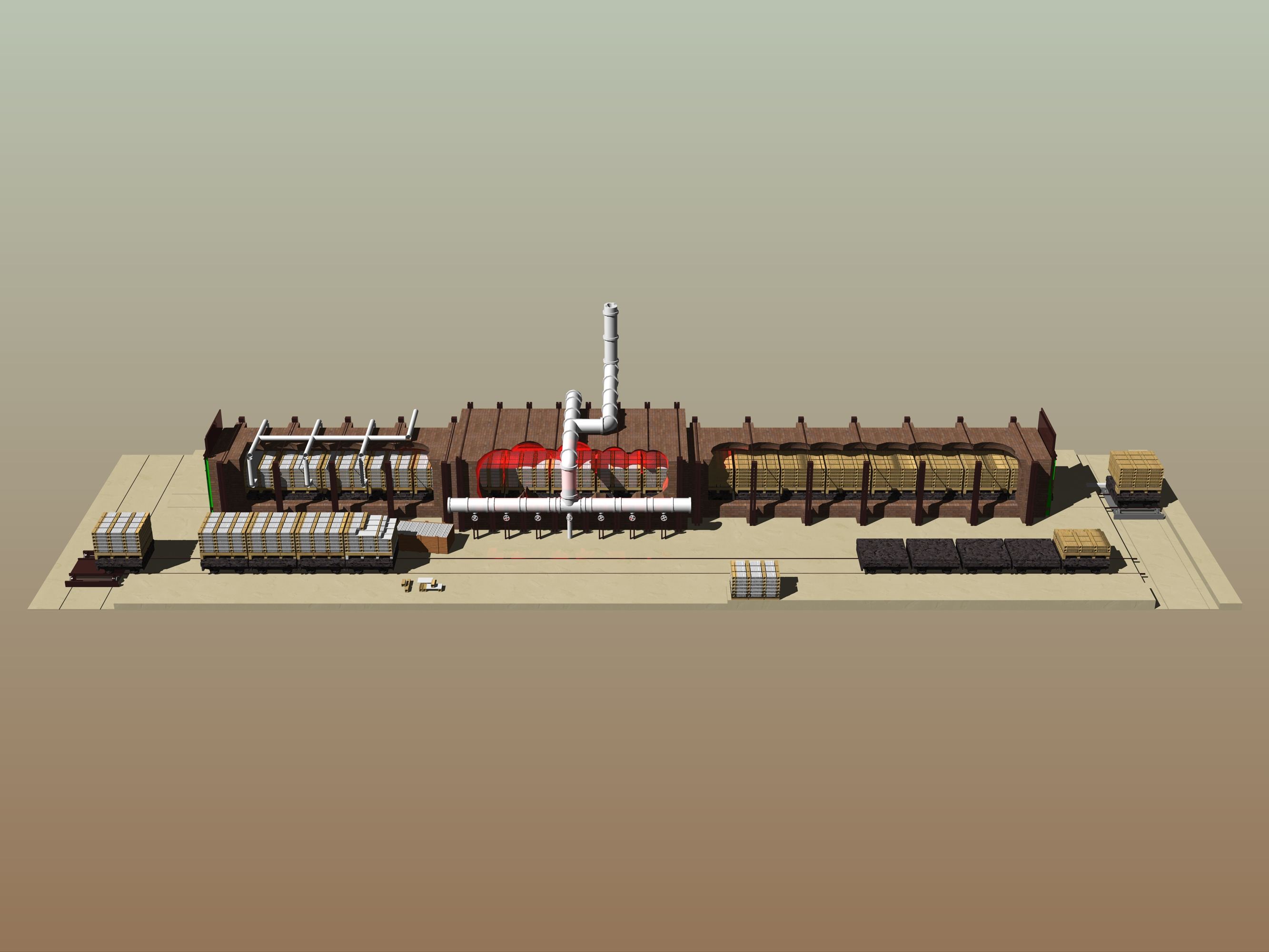
Woodville Tunnel kiln, additional image at Archaeological Investigations Ltd

John Knowle's Mount Pleasant Pipe-works at Woodville was once a major employer in the area. It has now been demolished but before redevelopment the bases of a tunnel kiln and beehive kiln were excavated. Together with detailed records going back to the 19th century and photos preserved by ex-employees it has been possible to create detailed 3-D reconstructions of the plant.

The beehive kilns were down-draft kilns. In this case they had a double skin with fire holes around the external circumference and a main loading door. Counter-weighted covers were used to open and close these openings. The heat would initially rise to the top of the kiln and then be forced down through the centre around the product, finally being vented below ground in tunnels to a chimney at the end of the group of kilns. The kilns were specifically designed for the production of salt-glazed sewerage pipes. Their construction reflects this as the salt could be added to the fires and then distributed evenly across the product as vapour at a certain stage of firing.

The tunnel kiln produced 70% of the country's gas fire radiants (white ceramic grills that sit in the front of many domestic gas fires) in the mid-20th century and was difficult to visualise from the archaeological evidence alone. The digital reconstruction has assisted in understanding how the technology worked. The later design of the tunnel kiln enabled continuous firing thereby minimising delays while waiting for it to cool before loading and unloading. The product was slowly passed through a central chamber using gas to fire it.

== Notable residents ==
- John Hurt, the actor, lived in Woodville for seven years (1945–1952) from the ages of five to twelve. His father was the vicar of St Stephen's parish church.
- Dr Selwyn Goodacre (b.1940), South Derbyshire GP, writer on Lewis Carroll, medical practice and book collecting has been resident in Woodville since 1970.
- Jane Plant (1943-2016), pioneer in the field of geochemical surveys and environmental surveys, was born in Woodville and lived there until she attended university. Her parents were the village shopkeepers.

== See also ==
- Listed buildings in Woodville, Derbyshire
- Listed buildings in Swadlincote
