= The Pingle Academy =

Location
- Coronation Street; Swadlincote, Derbyshire, DE11 0QA; England; 52°46′41″N 1°33′58″W

Information
- Type: Academy
- Motto: Respect, Engage, Succeed
- Established: 1 September 1965
- Department for Education URN: 144069 Tables
- Ofsted: Reports
- Executive Principal: M Oliphant
- Gender: Co-educational
- Age: 11 to 18
- Enrolment: 1286
- Website: www.pingleacademy.com

The Pingle Academy is a co-educational secondary school and sixth form located at Coronation Street in Swadlincote, South Derbyshire, England. The name comes from the former Pingle Farm; Pingle being a Midlands term for a small field or allotment.

== Admissions ==
The Pingle Academy educates over 1,500 students, from Years 7 to 13. GCSEs and A-Levels are taught here throughout the different years.

== History ==
The Swadlincote Pingle County Secondary School would cost £308,883, and built by Ford and Weston of Derby, in the CLASP system, and designed by RMJM.

It would have 750 in the first phase, and 1,000 in the second phase. It would start off as a nine-form entry school, to become nine-entry with 1,400.

It cost £337,000 and opened on Wednesday 1 September 1965, with 600. There would be 750 in 1966. It took over from Castle Gresley County Secondary School. The headmaster was Mr CA Laurie, the former headmaster from Castle Gresley, as well as the deputy head Mr FA Marlor. The playing fields were built by En Tout Ca.

On Saturday 2 July 1966, the school was officially opened by Denis Howell. It would operate as a junior high school for ages 11–14, and there was no eleven plus. It was planned to build a senior high school next to the school, for those up to 16. It was planned to build the 14-18 school by September 1972. A social studies building was built from 1973 by Walkerdine of Derby.

In the Top of the Form radio competition in 1983, the school competed with a comprehensive school in north-west Nottingham, in first round on Wednesday 28 September 1983, travelling to Nottingham by coach. Ruth Kinson, 12 from Overseal; Joanne Taylor, 14, from Linton; Ian Hassell, 15, from Church Gresley; and captain Neil Thompson, 17, from Church Gresley competed. There were four reserves, Ralph Furner, Susan Staley, David Peat and Darren Hodson. The school team lost 71 to 59, being broadcast on 12 October 1983.

In April 2009, in a GCSE Drama class children were asked to act out the violence in Schindler's List, which included rape. Parents complained and two drama teachers were suspended and replaced.

== Chronic arson ==
There was an arson attack at 3am on 14 December 1987, that cost £20,000. It destroyed the swimming pool, changing rooms and gym. The school had no electricity or water.

Two further arson attacks took place on 25 March 1988 and 1 April 1988. The second of these occurred in the two-storey science block, destroying two biology labs, a chemistry lab and a physics room, along with much GCSE work and worksheets for teachers. On 2 April 1988 25 year old Ian Graham Taylor appeared in court in Derby. He was not allowed bail. In September 1988 he admitted two counts of arson, costing £780,000. He had been given bail for the arson attack on 25 March 1988 by magistrates on 28 March 1988, then eight days later Mr Taylor had set fire to the science block, largely destroying it, costing £700,000. Mr Taylor had previously been given 18 months in custody for setting fire to the same school in July 1983. In 1988 it was not difficult to catch Mr Taylor; he told his brother Andrew what he had done. When arrested by the police, Mr Taylor admitted that he had done it. At that moment, the police suspected that Mr Taylor could have some mental frailties, or had an obsessive compulsive nature. Mr Taylor was educated in Ilkeston.

=== 2005 fire ===
On 2 December 2005, the Pingle School sixth-form building caught fire as a result of a 'break time prank gone wrong'. This resulted in the near total destruction of the sixth-form building. The fire was started within school hours and required the evacuation of the entire school population. Three 15-year-old boys were arrested in connection with the fire, one of whom was charged with arson and sentenced to 18 months' detention. Since the sixth-form centre was destroyed in the fire, temporary accommodation for lessons saw the use of portable classrooms, provided by Portakabin Ltd from their centre in Derby. The new sixth-form area was officially opened in December 2007, being in full use from February 2008.

== Sport ==
The school has a football team, rugby team and a basketball team for all years up to Year 11. Also in 2006, the school had an Astroturf field added to their large range of facilities which was opened by athlete Kriss Akabusi.

These facilities include:

- A regular sized swimming pool; used in lessons and out of school curriculum activities
- Multimillion-pound sports hall with gym suite
- Gymnastics hall
- Tennis/Basketball courts
- Full size multi sport Artificial Turf pitch

== Visits ==
- At 2pm on Tuesday 5 March 1996, the Duke of Gloucester opened new buildings, after visiting the University of Derby in the morning
- Education Secretary David Blunkett visited on Thursday 17 September 1998.
