= Leicester West Bridge railway station =

Former railway station in Leicester, England

Coordinates: 52.6349°N 1.1461°W

Leicester West Bridge
- West Bridge Station in 1832

General information
- Location: Leicester; England

Other information
- Status: Disused

History
- Original company: Leicester and Swannington Railway
- Pre-grouping: Midland Railway
- Post-grouping: London, Midland & Scottish Railway

Key dates
- 18 July 1832: Station opens as Leicester
- Before 26 April 1833: Renamed Leicester West Bridge
- 13 March 1893: Replaced by new station
- 24 September 1928: Station closes
Location

Leicester West Bridge is a former railway station in Leicester, Leicestershire. It was the terminus of the Leicester and Swannington Railway until 1928.

Being one of the earliest public railways, and intended for the transport of coal, the idea of carrying passengers had not occurred to the line's promoters. Thus facilities for buying tickets were provided at local inns or from the keepers of various road crossings. Such was the case at West Bridge until 1893 when, belatedly, the Midland Railway built a new passenger station around 150 yards away, nearer to the houses on the (then new) Tudor Road.

Passenger trains on the stub to Leicester West Bridge ended in September 1928, although coal and oil traffic continued until 29 April 1966 after which the track was removed and the station buildings demolished. The original 1832 station is thought to have been the third oldest station in the world; its site is now Richard III Road. Slightly to the west, the platform of the 1893 station is, as of 2017, extant. Further north the site of the engine shed and the sidings at Soar Lane New Wharf are now a public park, the Rally.
