= Mercia Academy =

State school in Derbyshire, England

Location
- Sunnyside, Newhall; Swadlincote, Derbyshire, DE11 0TL; England; 52°47′10″N 1°34′41″W

Information
- Type: Academy
- Local authority: Derbyshire
- Trust: Lionheart trust
- Department for Education URN: 149380 Tables
- Ofsted: Reports
- Headteacher: Jackie Cooper
- Gender: Co-educational
- Age: 11 to 16
- Enrolment: 985
- Website: http://www.williamallittacademy.org.uk/

Mercia Academy (formerly William Allitt School, William Allitt Academy), is a co-educational secondary school located in the village of Newhall, Swadlincote in South Derbyshire, England.

The school was founded in 1895 as the Newhall Central Board School, when the Newhall Oversetts and Newhall High Street Board Schools were merged. In 1914, the school was split into separate boys' and girls' schools, but these recombined in 1939. Due to subsidence from mining, it relocated to a new site in 1959, and was renamed after local councillor William Allitt. In 1966, it became a comprehensive school.

Previously a community school administered by Derbyshire County Council, in September 2022 William Allitt School converted to academy status and was renamed The William Allitt Academy. The school is now sponsored by the Falcon Education Academies Trust.

From 2024, school's headteacher is Nick Holmes. Deputy Headteacher Mike McCandless was acting head teacher from September 2013 to April 2014 and previous to this the head teacher was David Clarke. Clarke took over after John Crossley retired in 2010 having been head at the school since 1996.

== GCSE results ==
Prior to the arrival of Cooper the school had endured difficult times, eventually falling into special measures when inspected by Ofsted in 2014. Since then, the school made sustained progress, and gained improved Ofsted status, and a continued drive towards further improvements. The 2018 GCSE results saw the school remain just below half way in the national schools league table.

== Buildings ==
The main buildings are described as "of the Vic Hallam type". The local authority in 2018 authorized £500,000 for (further) building repairs.

== Notable former pupils ==
- Carl Dickinson, footballer
- Marc Goodfellow, footballer
