= Iain M. Hambling =

Iain M. Hambling is the historian and archivist of English pottery company T G Green & Co Ltd (1864 – 2007), manufacturers of Cornishware, a striped kitchenware brand. The company was based at Church Gresley, Derbyshire.

== Activities as historian and archivist ==
Starting as a collector of Cornishware in 1991, his collection grew and was largely featured in Paul Atterbury's first Cornish Ware & Domestic Pottery book.

First discussing Cornishware on the BBC's Antiques Roadshow (series 19, 1996–7), he went on to make another two appearances with other T G Green designs and later a half-hour programme on Channel 4, Collectors' Lot.

There was an active Collectors' Club between 1996 and 2001, for which Hambling wrote and advised in 'Iain's Corner'. The club folded upon the acquisition of T G Green by neighbouring company Mason Cash.

Increasingly aware of the many other unrecorded patterns dating from 1864, Hambling started to build collections of the patterns and created a virtual online museum. A second Atterbury book, concentrating on the many other domestic wares produced, followed in 2001.

Hambling continued to piece together collections of designs and patterns, concentrating initially on the Art Deco sets of the 1930s, and later the Victorian sets from the company's inception, as well as sourcing a lot of the original paperwork, tools and moulds which had been gradually removed from the now-derelict factory site at Church Gresley by treasure hunters and opportunists.

Through the means of Facebook, Hambling created a dedicated page to the pottery's history and founded a Collectors' Group in 2008, now with 3,000 members. Since 2016 there has been a privately run museum in the Swadlincote area, displaying a majority of the patterns produced from the family-owned period of 1864 to 1974, and the items from the original 'Cornish Ware Museum' run by the late Derek Green from his business in Hartley Wintney, returning the permanent display back to its original area of manufacture which will extend publicly in 2025.
