= Clamp (surname) =

Clamp is a surname. Notable people with the surname include:

- Arthur Clamp (1884–1918), English footballer
- Eddie Clamp (1934–1995), English footballer
- Paula Clamp (born 1967), novelist, playwright and Visiting Lecturer at the University of Ulster
- Shirley Clamp (born 1973), Swedish pop singer
- Steve Clamp (born 1976), British freelance journalist and newsreader
- Ted Clamp (1924–1990), English footballer
- William Clamp (1891–1917), Scottish Victoria Cross recipient
