= Clamp =

Clamp may refer to:

== Tools and devices ==
- Brick clamp, an early method of baking bricks
- Clamp (tool), a device or tool used to hold objects in a fixed relative position (many types listed)
  - C-clamp
  - C-clamp (stagecraft)
  - Riser clamp, a device used to support vertical piping
  - Hose clamp, a device to secure a hose to a fitting
- Nipple clamp, a sex toy
- Storage clamp, an agricultural root crop storage
- Wheel clamp, a device used with road vehicles to prevent theft or enforce parking restrictions

== Biology and medicine ==
- CLAMP (Climate leaf analysis multivariate program), a method for characterizing past climates
- Clamp (zoology), an attachment structure found in some parasitic flatworms
- Clamp connection, a structure formed by hyphal cells of certain fungi
- DNA clamp, a ring-like structure associated with DNA replication and other phenomena
- Glucose clamp technique, a method for quantifying insulin secretion and resistance
- Patch clamp, a technique used to hold a natural cell membrane or artificial lipid bilayer

== Electronics and software ==
- Clamp (function), the process of limiting a value to a particular range
- Clamper (electronics), an electrical circuit that limits one extreme of a signal by offsetting the signal
- Clipper (electronics), an electrical circuit that limits one extreme of a signal by holding the signal back
- Current clamp, a device for measuring electric current
- Voltage clamp, a technique and device used to measure ion transport across cells

== Fictional characters ==
- Clamp, a character in the television show Galactik Football
- Clamps, a member of the Robot Mafia in Futurama

== Other uses ==
- CLAMP, an all-female Japanese manga artist group that formed in the mid-1980s
- Clamp (surname), a surname
- (90+)
- (includes redirects)
