= St George and St Mary's Church, Church Gresley =

St George and St Mary’s Church, Church Gresley
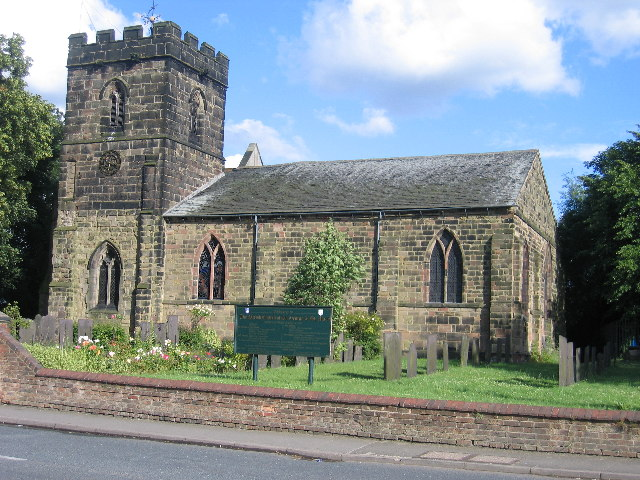
- St George and St Mary’s Church, Church Gresley
- St George and St Mary’s Church, Church Gresley
- 52°45′34.02″N 1°34′0.01″W
- Location: Church Gresley
- Country: England
- Denomination: Church of England

History
- Dedication: St George and St Mary the Virgin

Architecture
- Heritage designation: Grade II* listed

Administration
- Province: Province of Canterbury
- Diocese: Diocese of Derby
- Archdeaconry: Derby
- Deanery: Repton
- Parish: Church Gresley

St George and St Mary's Church, Church Gresley is a Grade II* listed parish church in the Church of England in Church Gresley, Derbyshire.

== History ==
The church dates from 1100 and incorporates the remains of the nave of a small Augustinian Priory, Gresley Priory.

The church was ruinous and restored in 1786. In 1872 a new chancel was added by Arthur Blomfield and all the seats were turned to face eastwards. In May 1932 the church was closed for 2 years because of the dangerous state of the ceiling. It re-opened in July 1934 after restoration. The church closed once again in 2018 due to falling masonry and structural issues with the roof.

== Organ ==
The pipe organ was installed by Forster and Andrews in 1860. It was later modified by S Taylor in 1888, H Cantrill in 1960 and Henry Groves & Son in 2000. A specification of the organ can be found on the National Pipe Organ Register.
