= Pipe support =

Element that transfers loads from a pipe to supporting structures

A pipe support or pipe hanger is a structural element that fixes a pipe in place and transfers loads between it and surrounding structures (functioning as a shock absorber if necessary). These loads include the weight of the pipe itself, the weight and pressure of any fluids inside or outside, and any attached pipe fittings or coverings such as insulation.

The overall design configuration of a pipe support assembly is dependent on loading and operating conditions. Pipe supports used in high- or low-temperature applications may contain integrated insulation materials.

== Loads ==
Primary loads are typically steady or sustained, such as internal fluid pressure, external pressure, gravitational forces from the weight of the pipe and its contents, pressure relief or blowdown, or hydraulic shock effects such as water hammer.

=== Sustained primary loads ===
==== Pressure ====
A pipe used for transporting fluid would be under an internal pressure load. A pipe such as a jacketed pipe core or a shell-and-tube heat exchanger may be under net external pressure. Internal or external pressure induces axial and cylinder stresses (as well as radial stresses, but these are often neglected).

Internal pressure exerts an axial force equal to pressure multiplied by the solid cross-sectional area of the pipe: F = P(πd² ÷ 4). If outer diameter is used for calculating approximate cross-sectional area, the axial stress can often be approximated as follows: S = Pd ÷ (4t).

==== Dead weight ====
Dead weight comprises the total weight of the pipe including fluid, fittings, valves, insulation, and other inline components. This type of load acts throughout the life cycle of the pipe.

In horizontal pipes, these loads may cause bending, with the bending moment being related to normal and shear stresses. Vertical pipes, or risers, can be supported by riser clamps.

=== Occasional primary loads ===
==== Wind ====
Piping which is located outdoors and thus exposed to wind will be designed to withstand the maximum wind velocity expected during the plant operating life. Wind force is modelled as a uniform load acting upon the projected length of the pipe perpendicular to the direction of the wind. Wind pressure for various elevations will be used to calculate wind force using the following formula: Fw = Pw × S × A, where Fw is the total wind force, Pw is the equivalent wind pressure, S is the wind drag coefficient shape factor, and A is the area of the pipe that is exposed to wind.

==== Seismic load ====
Seismic loading is one of the basic concepts of earthquake engineering. It occurs at the contact surfaces of a structure with the ground, adjacent structures, or waves from tsunamis.

==== Hydraulic shock ====
Hydraulic shock (also known as water hammer, steam hammer, or more generally, fluid hammer) occurs as a pressure surge or wave caused when a fluid in motion is forced to stop or change direction suddenly. Shock commonly occurs when a valve closes suddenly, causing a pressure wave to propagate in the pipe. Though the flow is transient, for the purpose of piping stress analysis, only the unbalanced force along the pipe segment tending to induce piping vibration is calculated and applied on the piping model as static equivalent force.

==== Safety valve discharge ====
Reaction forces from a relief valve discharge are considered an occasional load. Any reaction force due to steady-state flow following the opening of a relief valve in an open-discharge installation can be calculated in accordance with ASME B31.1 Appendix II and applied to the piping model as a static equivalent force.

=== Secondary loads ===
Just as the primary loads have their origin in some force, secondary loads are caused by displacement of some kind, such as from thermal expansion or vibrations from any moving equipment it is attached to. Secondary loads are often, but not always, cyclic.

== Types ==
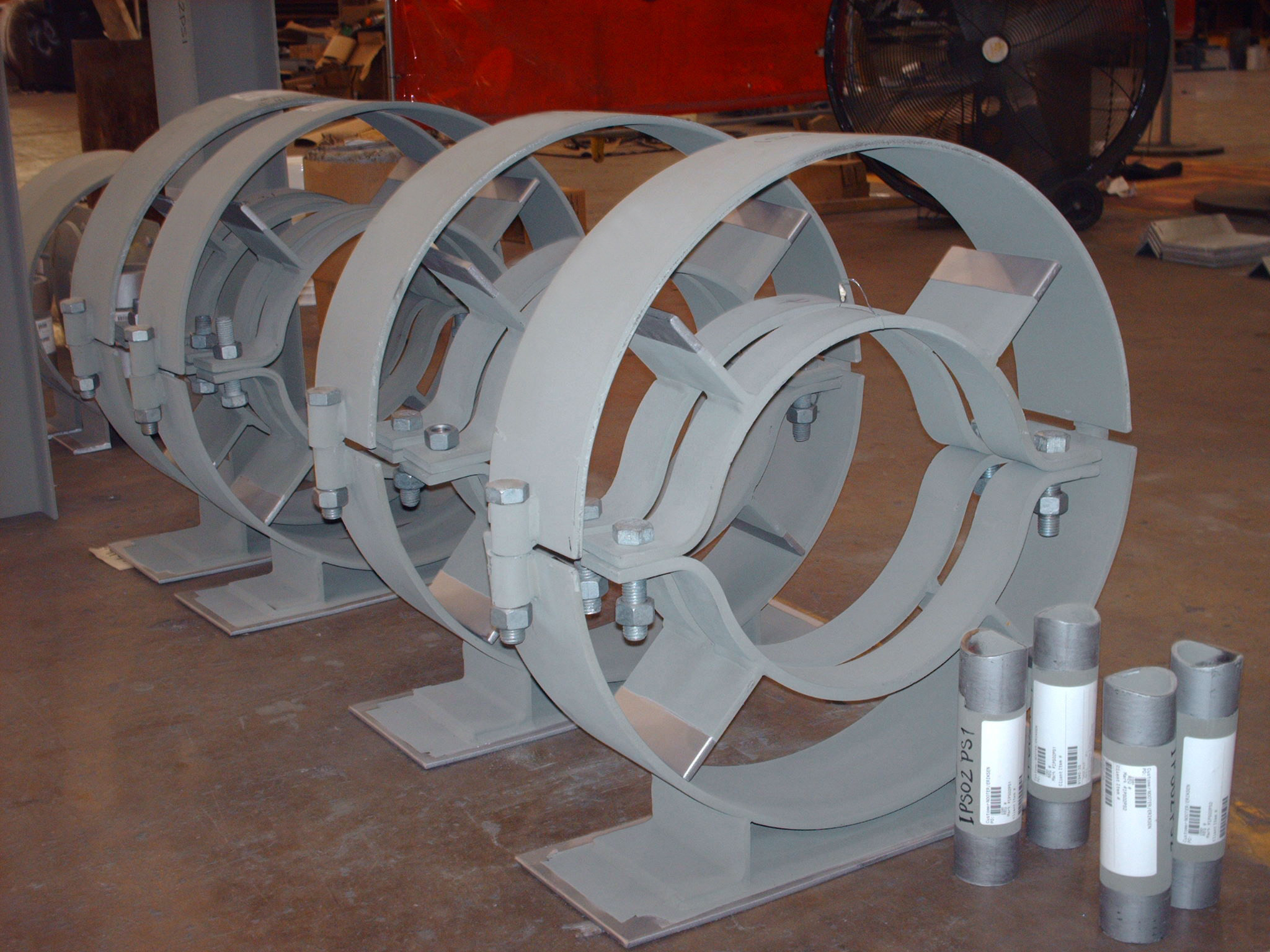
"Spider" pipe guides

=== Rigid supports ===
Rigid supports are used to restrict piping in certain directions without any flexibility. These can take the form of anchors, rests, guides, or a hybrid rest-guide design.

Rigid support can be provided either from the bottom or the top of a pipe. In case of bottom supports, a stanchion or pipe clamp base is generally used. To simultaneously restrict movement in another direction, separate plates or lugs can be used.

Pipe anchors

==== Anchors ====
A pipe anchor, or "shoe", is a rigid support that restricts movement in all three orthogonal directions and all three rotational directions, i.e. all 6 degrees of freedom. This is usually a stanchion that is welded or bolted to steel or concrete. With this type of support, graphite or PTFE pads are used to alleviate normal and friction forces when required.

===== Rod hangers =====
Rod hangers are static restraints that mount to the top of a pipe and are designed only to withstand tensile loads (buckling may occur upon compression). They consist of clamps, eye nuts, tie rods, and/or beam attachments. The design or selection of a rod hanger depends on pipe size, load, temperature, insulation, assembly length, and other factors. As it uses a hinge and clamp, no substantial friction forces are introduced.

===== Struts =====
Similarly to hangers, struts use hinges and clamps (plus clevis fasteners), so no substantial friction forces are introduced. Selection also depends on pipe size, load, temperature, insulation, and assembly length. Unlike hangers, struts are designed to withstand both tensile and compression loads. They also offer more mounting flexibility, as they can be configured in vertical and horizontal directions. "V-type" struts can be used to restrict movement in two degrees.

=== Flexible supports ===
Flexible supports use springs to accommodate changing loads and associated pipe movements due to thermal expansion. They are broadly classified into variable-effort or constant-effort supports. The critical components in both types of flexible supports are coil springs; spring hangers & supports usually use compression coil springs.

==== Variable effort ====
Variable effort supports (VESs), also known as variable hangers or simply "variables", are used to support pipe lines subjected to moderate vertical movements of up to 50 mm (2 in) and a load variation of no greater than 25%. VES units are used to support the weight of pipework and liquids (gases are considered weightless) while allowing a certain quantity of vertical movement with respect to the supporting structure. Spring supports may also be used for pipelines subject to reoccurring movements from subsidence or earthquakes.

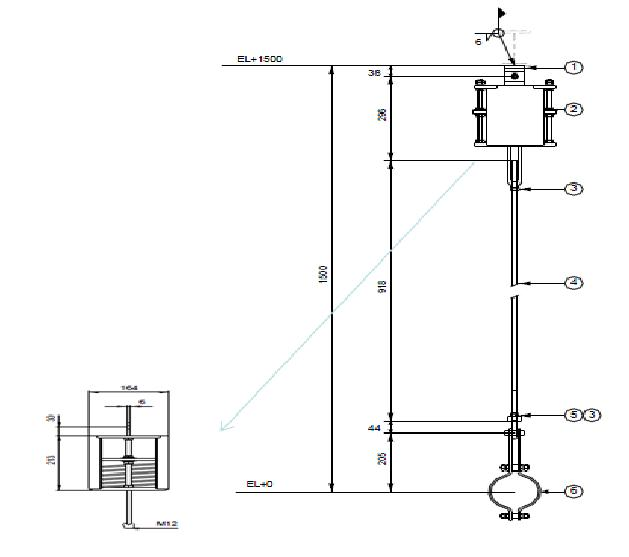
Variable-spring hanger

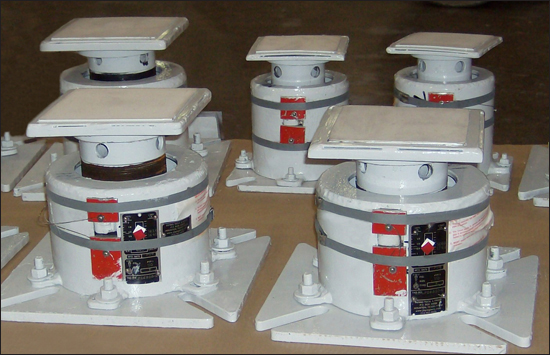
Variable-spring supports

A VES unit is fairly simple in construction, with the pipe effectively suspended directly from a coil spring (as the cutaway sketch shows), the main components being:

1. Top plate
2. Pressure plate or piston plate
3. Bottom plate or base plate
4. Helical spring
5. Turnbuckle assembly
6. Locking rods
7. Name plate
8. Can section or cover

Due to layout feasibility or any other reason, an alternative base mount VES design may be used wherein the pipe rests on top of the flange of the spring support.

Normally, clients or engineering consultants will furnish the following data when selecting a variable effort unit:

- "Hot load" from thermal expansion under operating conditions (normally, MSS-SP58 specifies a maximum load variation of 25%)
- Movement amount and direction
- Maximum load variation as a percentage (if not specified, then it is assumed to be 25% as per MM-SP58)
- Support type (hanger, bottom-mount, etc.)
- Any special features, such as travel limit stops
- Preferred surface protection or finish

==== Constant effort ====
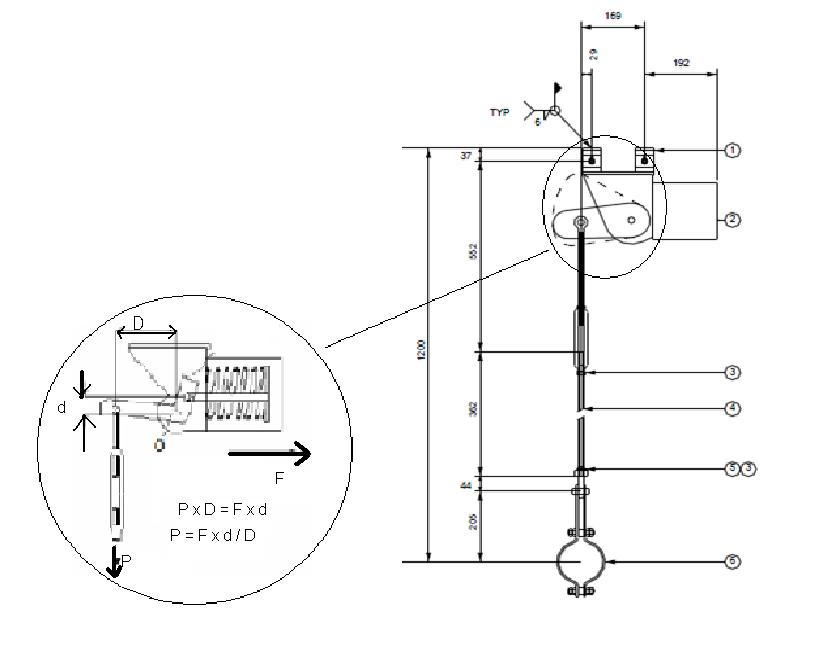
Constant-spring bellcrank

With larger vertical movements of typically 150–250 mm (6–10 in), or with a load variation exceeding 25% or the specified maximum variation of a VES, a constant effort support (CES) is used. For so-called "critical piping" where no residual stresses are to be transferred to the pipework, it is a common practice to use CESs.

In a constant effort support, the load remains constant when the pipe moves from its initial "cold" state to its operating "hot" state. Thus, irrespective of travel, the load remains constant over the complete range of movement. This is in contrast to a VES, where the load varies with movement and the "hot" and "cold" loads are two different values governed by the travel & spring constant.

A CES unit does not have an established spring rate, instead relying on a bellcrank between the pipe and a tie rod, which is in turn connected to the spring at the end furthest from the bellcrank. When the pipe changes state from cold to hot, it descends; this causes the bellcrank to rotate counter-clockwise and pull the tie rod, compressing the spring. When the pipe ascends, the bellcrank rotates clockwise and pushes the tie rod out, allowing the spring to expand or relax.

Another popular principle is a three-spring or adjusting spring mechanism, wherein one main vertical spring is supplemented by two auxiliary horizontal springs to balance out any extra vertical loads.

==== Dynamic restraints ====
A dynamic restraint, or snubber, fulfills an entirely different function to a support. While the latter carries the weight of the pipework and allows it to move freely under normal operating conditions, the former protects the pipework and surrounding structure from abnormal conditions without impeding the function of the supports. Certain system functions or environmental influences may necessitate the use of restraints:

- Fluid disturbances can be caused by the effect of pumps and compressors or, occasionally, liquid entering a pipe intended for gas or steam.
- Some system functions such as rapid valve closure, pulsation due to pumping, and the operation of safety relief valves will cause irregular and sudden loading patterns within the piping system.
- Disturbances can result from high wind loads or, in the case of offshore oil platforms, ocean wave impacts.
- In areas situated on or near fault lines, dynamic restraints help protect pipework from potential earthquake activity.

A restraint system will be designed to account for all of these influences. It is designed to absorb and transfer sudden increases in load from the pipe to the building structure and to deaden any oscillation between the pipe and the structure. Therefore, high stiffness, a high load capacity, and minimal free movement between the pipe and structure are required.

Hydraulic shock absorbers

Depending on working principle, snubbers can be classified as:

- Hydraulic: Similar to an automobile shock absorber, a hydraulic snubber is built around a cylinder containing hydraulic fluid with a piston that displaces the fluid from one end of the cylinder to the other. Displacement of fluid results from the movement of the pipe, causing the piston to displace within the cylinder, resulting in higher pressure at one end of the cylinder and lower pressure at the other. The velocity of the piston will dictate the actual difference in pressure. The fluid passes through a spring-loaded valve, the spring being used to hold the valve open. If the differential pressure across the valve exceeds the effective pressure exerted by the spring, the valve will close. This causes the snubber to become rigid and further displacement is substantially prevented. Hydraulic snubbers are normally used when the axis of restraint is in the direction of expansion and contraction of the pipe. The snubber is therefore required to extend or retract with normal pipe operation. A hydraulic snubber has low resistance to movement at very low velocities.
- Mechanical: As an example, a clutch-like split flywheel is made to rotate at high speed, causing steel balls to be forced radially outwards. The two parts of the flywheel are forced apart by the steel balls, causing braking plates to come together and retarding the axial displacement of the snubber. Rotation of the flywheel is generated by the linear displacement of a rod acting on a ball screw or similar device. This type of device is significantly more complex and expensive.

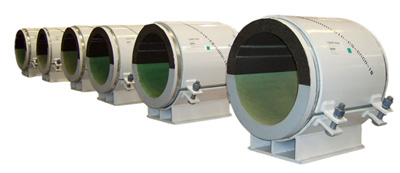
"Cold shoe" insulated supports

=== Insulated supports ===
Also called pre-insulated supports, these are load-bearing members that minimize heat dissipation, increasing system efficiency. Insulated pipe supports can be designed for vertical, axial and/or lateral loading combinations in both low- and high-temperature applications.

== Materials ==
Pipe supports are fabricated from a variety of materials including structural steel, carbon steel, stainless steel, aluminum, ductile iron, and FRP composites. Most pipe supports are coated to protect against moisture and corrosion. Some methods for corrosion protection include painting, zinc coatings, hot-dip galvanization or a combination of these. In the case of FRP pipe supports, the elements required to form a corrosion cell are not present, so no additional coatings or protections are necessary.

== Standards ==
- Design: ASME B31.1, ASME B31.3, ASME Section VIII Pressure Vessels
- Manufacturing: MSS-SP58 (Material, Design, Manufacture, Selection, Application & Installation. Note:MSS SP-58-2009 Incorporates and Supersedes the contents of ANSI/MSS SP-69-2003, MSS SP-77, MSS SP-89, and MSS SP-90), AWS-D1.1, ASTM-A36, ASTM-A53, ASTM-A120, ASTM-A123 and A446, ASTM-A125, ASTM-A153, ASTM-307 and A325, ASTM-C916, ASTM-D1621, ASTM-D1622, ASTM-D1623. Supports with insulation inserts must also reference ASTM-C585.
- Quality Systems: ISO 9001, ASQC Q-92, CAN3 Z299
- Testing: ANSI B18.2.3
