= Church Gresley =

Village in Derbyshire, England

Coordinates: 52.760°N 1.566°W

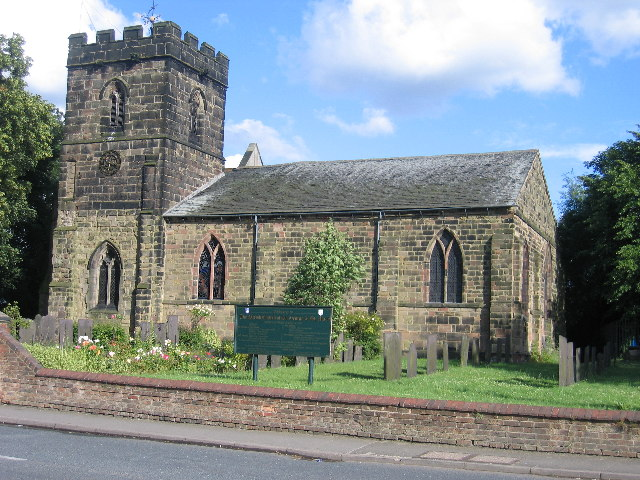
- St George & St Mary's parish church

- Location within Derbyshire
- Population: 6,881 (2011 Census)
- OS grid reference: SK2918
- District: South Derbyshire
- Shire county: Derbyshire
- Region: East Midlands
- Country: England
- Sovereign state: United Kingdom
- Post town: Swadlincote
- Postcode district: DE11
- Dialling code: 01283
- Police: Derbyshire
- Fire: Derbyshire
- Ambulance: East Midlands
- UK Parliament: South Derbyshire

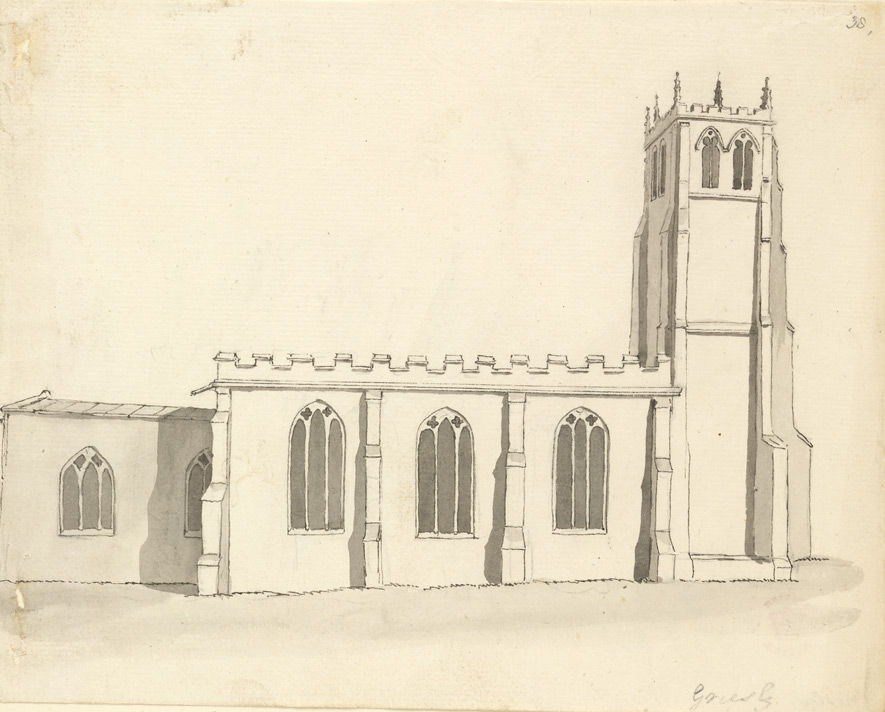
St George and St Mary's Church, drawn by Samuel Hieronymus Grimm (18th century)

Church Gresley is a large suburban village and former civil parish in the South Derbyshire district of Derbyshire, England. The village is situated between Castle Gresley and the town of Swadlincote, with which it is contiguous. By the time of the 2011 Census the village was a ward of Swadlincote, of which it is now effectively a suburb, and the population of Church Gresley ward was 6,881. The village forms part of the border with Leicestershire to the southeast. Nearby villages include Albert Village, Linton and Overseal.

== History ==
Gresele is recorded in the Domesday Book of 1086. Its first element is of uncertain origin, possibly the Old English grēosn meaning gravel and lēah meaning a woodland clearing. Churchegreseleye was first recorded in 1363 and distinguishes it from Castle Gresley.

In 1951 the civil parish had a population of 7771. On 1 April 1974 the parish was abolished and became part of the unparished area of Swadlincote.

=== Priory and church ===
See also Gresley Priory
A priory of Augustinian canons was founded at Gresley in the reign of Henry I, by William de Gresley, son of Nigel de Stafford. It was suppressed in 1536 in the Dissolution of the Monasteries.

The Church of England parish church of Saint George and Saint Mary was built early in the 12th century as the priory's conventual church. Of the 12th-century building only the lower part of the tower survives. In about 1820 the church and the upper part of the tower were rebuilt. The chancel was designed by Arthur Blomfield and built in 1872. The church is a Grade II* listed building.

The tower has a ring of six bells. The fourth bell was cast by Henry Oldfield of Nottingham. Its date is unknown, but is known that Oldfield was casting bells between 1590 and 1620. George Oldfield of Nottingham cast the fifth and tenor bells in 1639. John Taylor & Co of Loughborough cast or recast the second and third bells in 1958 and cast the present treble bell in 1991.

=== Economic and social history ===
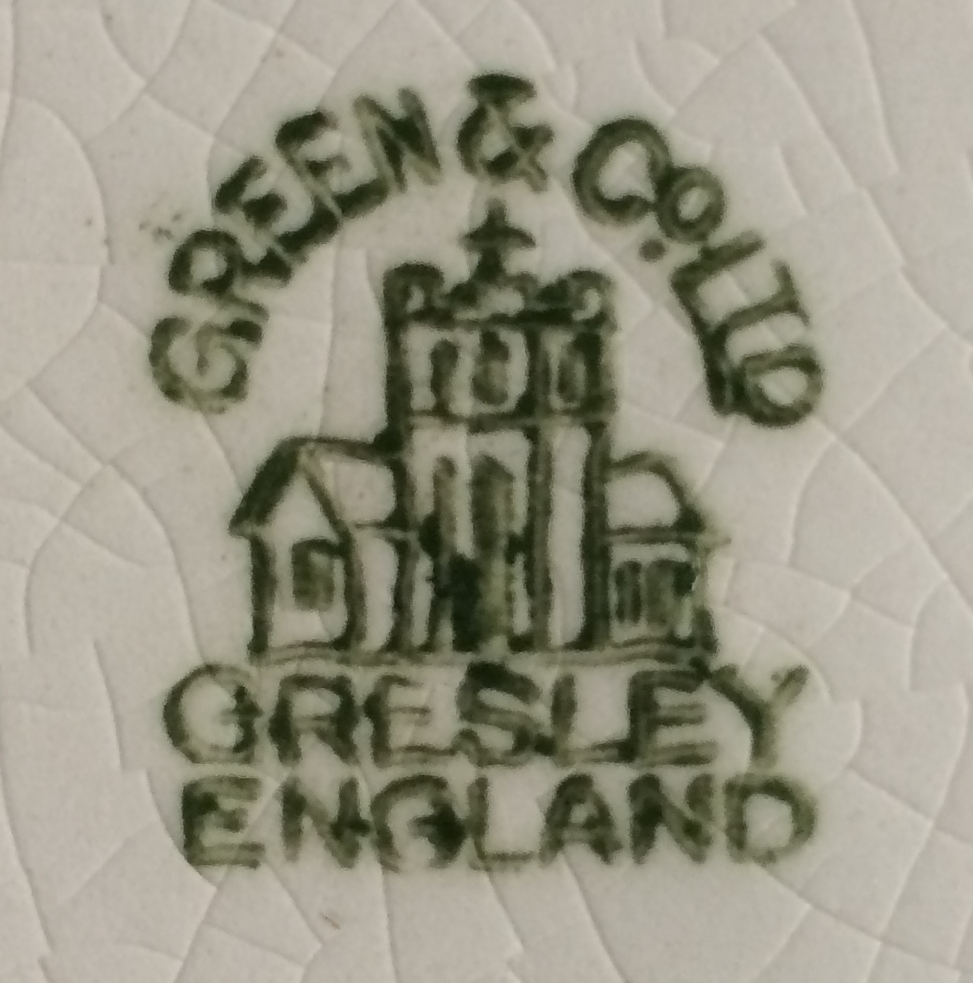
T G Green & Co Ltd back stamp showing St George & St Mary church

In about 1800 the Mason pottery was founded at Church Gresley. It was renamed Mason Cash in 1901. Mason Cash became a well-known English pottery, producing many kinds of ceramic mixing and baking ware. TG (Thomas Goodwin) Green & Co Ltd was founded in 1864 and went on to produce the world-famous Cornishware. Both companies became part of The Tabletop Group in 2004. TG Green went into administration in 2007.

From 1882 the local football club was Gresley Rovers, which competed in the Northern Premier League First Division and played at The Moat Ground, one of Church Gresley's landmarks. The club was relegated in 2009 to the East Midlands Counties League and is now named Gresley FC. Its training pitch is the main football pitch of Church Gresley's Maurice Lea Memorial Park, which is named after Maurice Lea, who died in France, the age of 19, during World War I. The most notable homegrown talent was goalkeeper Ted Clamp who played for the team before moving to teams such as Buxton, Bolton and Derby County. There are also football pitches near the Swadlincote Ski Centre.

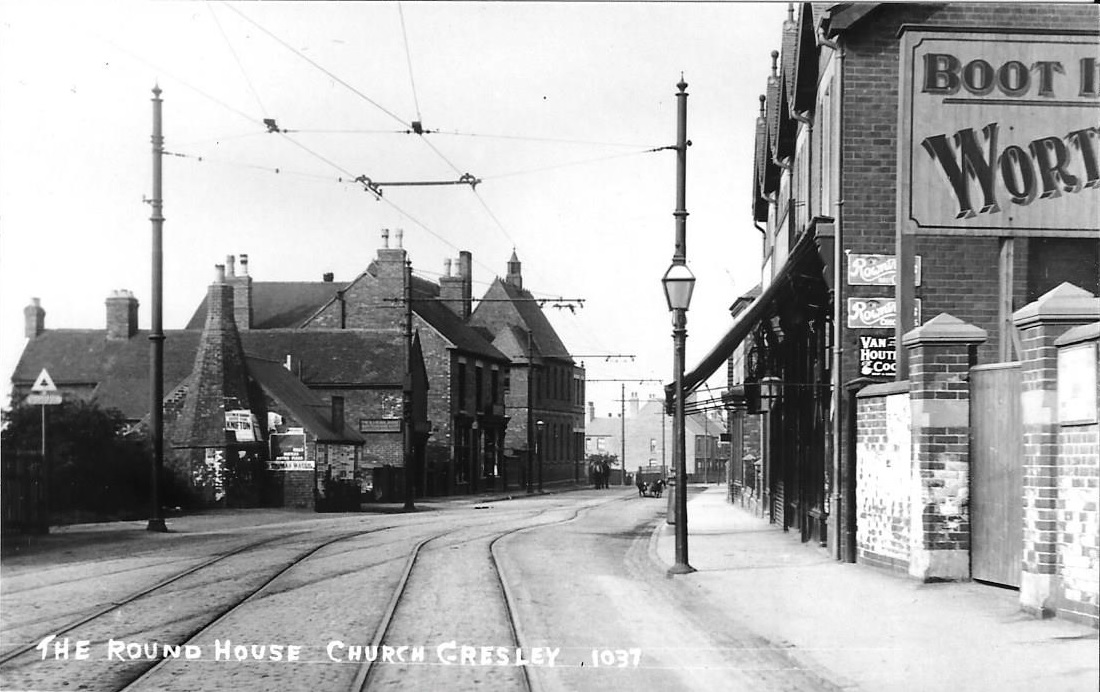
A 1905 photographic postcard depicting the original Round House or Lock Up in Church Gresley

Church Gresley was one of only a handful of villages in South Derbyshire that had a Round House or village lock-up. Used for the temporary detention of people, they were often used for the confinement of drunks who were usually released the next day or to hold people being brought before the local magistrate.

Opposite the park is Gresley Common, the venue for annual bonfire nights until 2003 and the local Scouts. There are many newly planted woods nearby as part of the National Forest. Early in the 2010s the extensive Highgrove housing development effectively created an entirely new district contiguously north of the village.

== Transport ==
Diamond East Midlands bus route 21 serves Church Gresley.

Church Gresley is on National Cycle Route 63. The Sustrans National Cycle Network route passes through Maurice Lea Park and leaves the village via Thorpe Downs Road. Route 63 uses the off-road and family-friendly Conkers Circuit to link Church Gresley with the heart of the National Forest then continues off-road to Measham on the track of the disused Ashby and Nuneaton Joint Railway and parts of the Ashby Woulds Heritage Trail. An alternative branch of route 63 circles the lake at nearby Albert Village.

== See also ==
- Listed buildings in Swadlincote
- Notable people in Swadlincote

== Sources ==
- Page, WH, ed. (1907). A History of the County of Derby. Victoria County History. Vol. 2. Westminster: Archibald Constable & Co. pp. 56–58.
- Pevsner, Nikolaus; Williamson, Elizabeth (1978) [1953]. Derbyshire. The Buildings of England. Harmondsworth: Penguin Books. pp. 152–153. ISBN 0-14-071008-6.
