= Mason Cash =

British pottery company

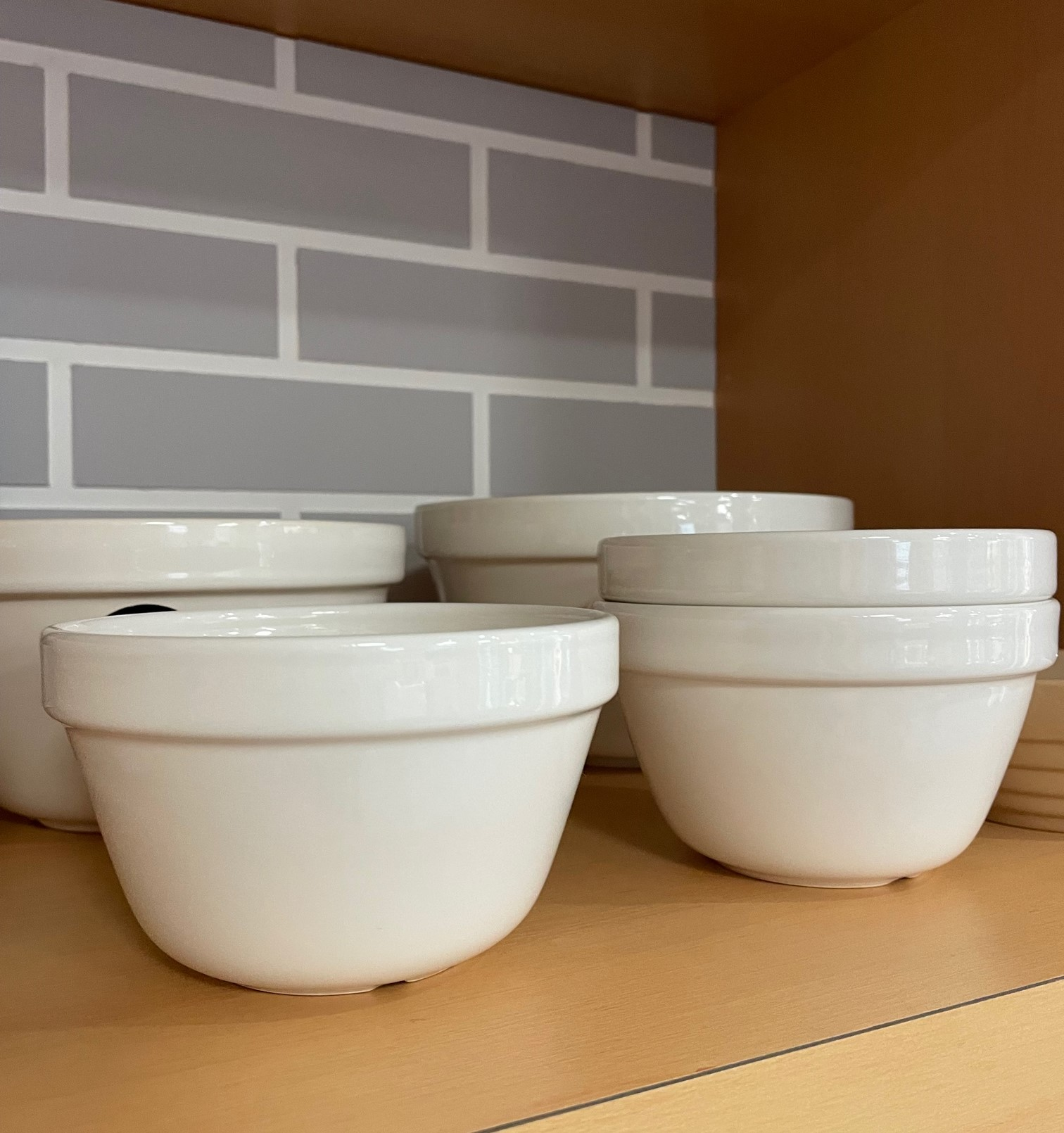
Mason Cash Original White Pudding Basins

Mason Cash originated as a pottery company, based in Woodville, Swadlincote, Derbyshire, UK, making a range of earthenware and stoneware kitchenware including mixing bowls, pudding basins and petware. They are most well known for their range of 'Cane Bowls'. Mason Cash is now a brand of the Rayware Group and while many of the Mason Cash items have retained their original designs, others embody contemporary twists, evolving into progressive modern interpretations of the originals.

== History ==
The origins of Mason Cash can be traced back to a pottery already operating at Church Gresley around 1800. The location was selected due to the local deposits of clay and coal. Mason Cash ceramic items were made from ‘white and cane’ glazed earthenware sometimes known as ‘yellow ware’ due to the colour of the local clay.

Mason Cash had been producing mixing bowls during the 1800s, but in 1901 they designed and manufactured the very first iconic Mason Cash mixing bowl. The design of the Mason Cash mixing bowl has barely changed in over 100 years and can be recognised by its original and distinctive pattern on the outside of the bowl.

=== Expansion ===
- 1930s & 1940s - expanded their product line to include petware.
- 1941 - Thomas Cash's son took over, and incorporated the company as Mason, Cash & Co. Ltd. They continued to produce utilitarian wares throughout the Second World War.
- 1973 - the company was purchased by A. B. Merriam.
- 1979 - ownership was acquired by John Perks and his wife Karen (Merriam's daughter) through the holding company J E and K P (Ceramics) Ltd.
- 1986 - the company acquired Cauldon Potteries, and the rights to the 'Royal Cauldon' name from T. Brown & Son Ltd. of the Ferrybridge Pottery, Knottingley, Yorkshire where production continued until 2003.
- 2001 - the company purchased T. G. Green and worked to revive that pottery's Cornish Blue kitchenware line.
- 2004 - The Tabletop Company purchased Mason Cash in April 2004, thus forming The Tabletop Group.
- 2006 - Production in Swadlincote was stopped, with the machinery moved to Portugal where production continues.
- 2007 - The Rayware Group acquired the Mason Cash brand. Sister brand T. G. Green was acquired by Charles Rickard and Paul Burston and relaunched.
- 2021 - Mason Cash launched its very first e-commerce site, selling directly to consumers.

== Mixing bowl sizes ==
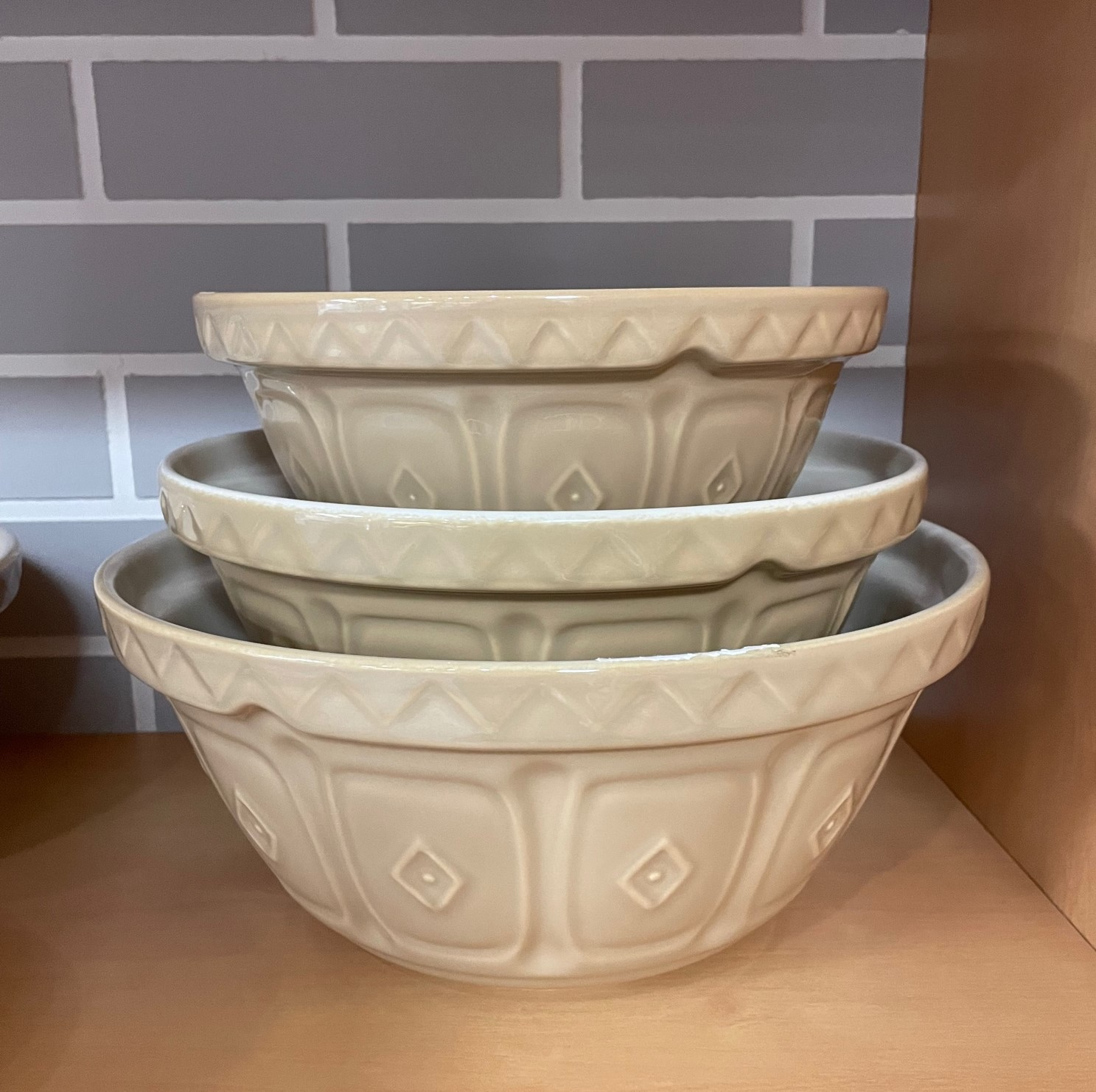
Mason Cash Original Cane Mixing Bowls

The Mason Cash mixing bowls are sold in various numbered sizes. The size number of the bowl refers to how many bowls could fit in the kiln in the original factory.

Mixing bowl size	Diameter (top)
4	35 cm
6	33 cm
9	32 cm
12	29 cm
18	26 cm
24	24 cm
30	21 cm
36	15 cm
42	12 cm

== See also ==
- Cornishware
