= Gresley Priory =

Monastery in Derbyshire, England

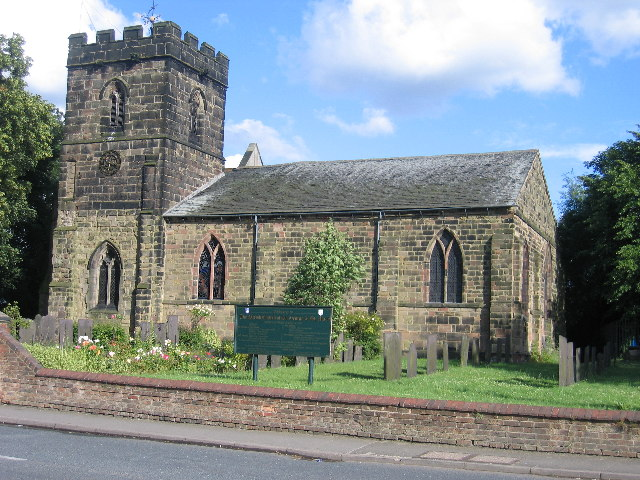
- Gresley Parish Church.

- Location within Derbyshire

Monastery information
- Full name: The Prior and Convent of Saint George.
- Other names: Later, The Parish Church of Saint George and Saint Mary.
- Order: Augustinian
- Established: Between 1106 and 1135
- Disestablished: 1536
- Dedication: Saint George
- Diocese: Diocese of Lichfield
- Controlled churches: Lullington, Derbyshire

People
- Founder: William De Gresley

Site
- Location: Church Gresley, Derbyshire, England, United Kingdom.
- Coordinates: 52°45′35″N 1°34′1″W
- Visible remains: Part of present Parish Church

Gresley Priory was a monastery of Augustinian Canons regular in Church Gresley, Derbyshire, England, founded in the 12th century.

Following the Dissolution of the Monasteries, the priory church became the village's parish church of St George and St Mary It was the church that gave Church Gresley its name.

Excavations undertaken in 1861 reveal the priory's buildings were situated around a cloister to the south of the church; the refectory occupied the south range, and two chapter houses occupied spaces to the east of the cloister. Of the original 12th-century priory buildings, only the foundations of the church and the lower section of the tower remain; this is due to large scale rebuilding works done around 1820. The church is Grade II* listed.

== History ==
=== Foundations and the 12th Century ===
The Priory was founded by William De Gresley, of the neighbouring Castle Gresley, during the reign of King Henry I (1106-1135); it was to house a group of Augustinian canons and was dedicated to Saint George. As primary beneficiaries, the Gresley family would retain influence over the priory over the following centuries.

=== 13th Century ===
In the year 1245, a later William de Gresley gifted the advowson of the nearby Church of Lullington, Derbyshire to the Prior and his heirs in-return for "all the benefits and prayers which should henceforth take place in the conventual church of Gresley, for ever." This, and all other previous charters and gifts from the Gresley family to the Priory, were confirmed by Sir Geoffrey de Gresley in 1268; these included the grant of the mill at Castle Gresley to the priory. In 1291, Sir Geoffrey's grandson, another Geoffrey de Gresley assigned lands to the priory in the parish of Castle Gresley; in the following years he made arrangements for one canon of the priory to sing mass for the soul of his wife Anneys.

In the Taxation Roll of 1291, the priory was valued at £3 19s. 7 1/2d. a year, with the churches of Gresley and Lullington both valued at £5 6s. 8d. a year.

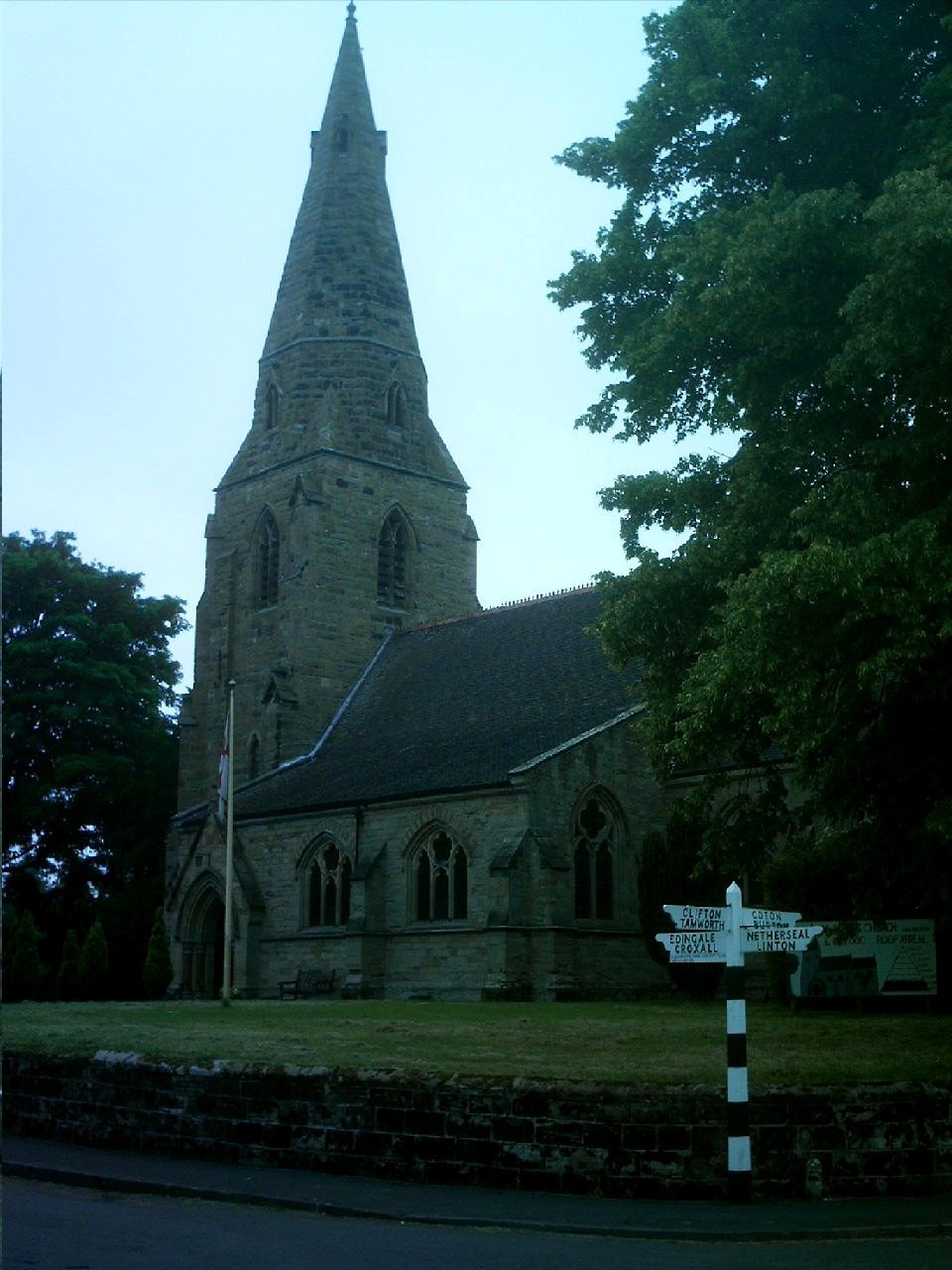
All Saints Church, Lullington

=== 14th Century ===
By the 14th century the priory appears to have fallen on hard times: Having in 1310, upon payment of a fine, been granted the Mortmain of the Church of Lullington, they repeatedly appealed to the Bishop for his sanction to dispose of the church; the Priory's canons arguing that, due to their small number and the "barrenness" of their lands, that they were struggling to support both themselves and the church. It was not, however, until 1339 that Roger Northburgh, Bishop of Coventry and Lichfield, sanctioned the mortmain; he, however, demanded in return that the priors pay a pension of 2 Marks a year to the vicars at Lichfield Cathedral, and that the Prior and all his successors should travel to the Chapter House of the Cathedral within 6 days of their election in-order to "take an oath on the Gospels as to the faithful payment of the pension". The correspondence between the Priory and Bishop reveal that at the time there were only four "brethren" at the priory.

In June 1313, Bishop Walter Langton visited the priory and subsequently ordered that licences and pensions were not to be granted from the Priory without episcopal licence, and that no women were to be allowed within the monastery bounds. The cause of this action is unclear and open to debate: had there been some discrepancies in the priory's financial affairs? Were there reports of improper behavior between the canons and visiting women? Was this a response to the priories requests for the Mortmain? Or was this simply a standard action taken by the Bishop?

In 1363, Sir John de Gresley, gave the priory properties and land at Heathcote, Church Gresley, Castle Gresley, and Lullington, which were valued at £10 per annum; these properties and land would then pass to the priory fully on the death of their tenants. Documents at this time name the priory as "The Prior and Convent of St. George".

=== 15th Century ===
Having had only 4 brethren in the early 14th century, the Priory appears to have remained small through the 15th century: as in February 1493, following the death of the Prior John Smyth, the sub-prior, Robert Mogge, had to write to the Bishop and ask him to directly appoint a new prior as they had insufficient numbers to elect one themselves; The Bishop simply appointed the sub-prior, Robert Mogge, as Prior.

=== 16th Century ===
The Valor of 1535 valued the Priory as worth £26 15s. 4d. annually; with of the rectories of Gresley and Lullington valued at a further £12 18s. 4d., the total value of the Priory was £39 13s. 8d. Deductions (which included 18s. 4d. for alms to the poor) left the clear annual value at £31 6s (equivalent to approx 3 years of the average craftsman wages ).

The priory was dissolved a year later in 1536. The Prior, John Okeley, was granted a pension of £6; two cannons serving as vicars of Lullington and Gresley were both granted £5 16s. 8d.

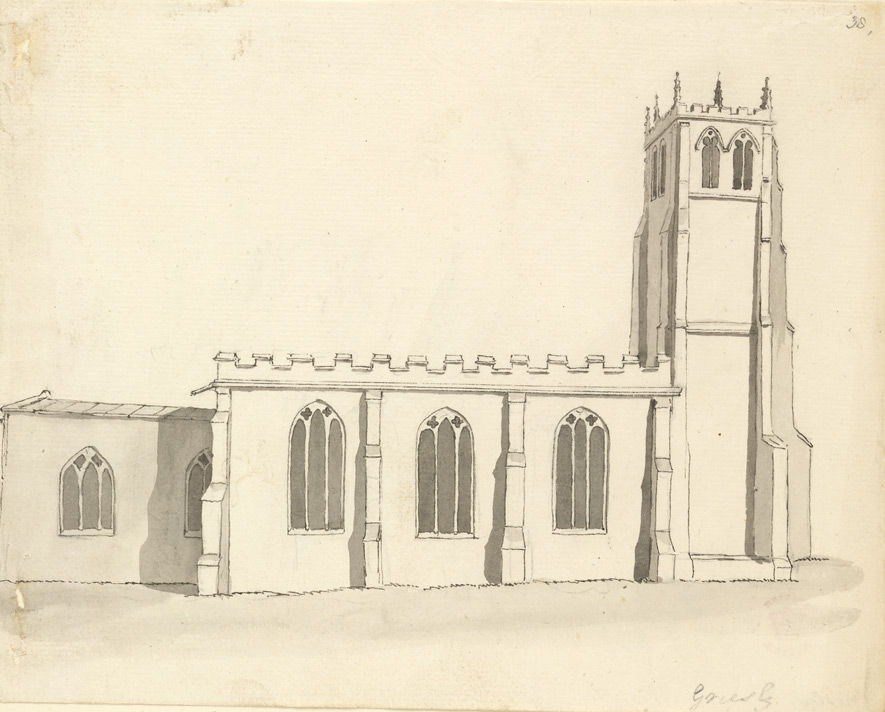
SS George & Mary parish church, drawn by Samuel Hieronymus Grimm in the 18th century; Prior to the church's large-scale reconstruction in the 1820s

== History following the dissolution ==
Following dissolution in 1536, the priory was granted to "Henry Churche of the Householde".

Previously there had been no regularly ordained vicarage of Gresley, and no pre-Reformation institutions appear in the diocesan registers; the parish had previously been served by the prior or one of the canons. Following the dissolution the Priory church gained a new role as the Parish Church, becoming St George and St Mary's Church, Church Gresley.

In around 1820 the church and upper part of the tower were rebuilt. In 1872 the chancel was built, to the designs of A.W. Blomfield.

Today, of the 12th-century building, only the lower part of the tower survives. The church is protected as a Grade II* Listed building.

== Priors of Gresley ==
An (incomplete) chronological list of the known Priors of Gresley:

- Walter - C.1200
- Reginald - C.1220
- Richard I - C.1240
- Henry - C.1252
- Richard II - C.1268 (died 1281)
- William de Seyle - appointed 1291
- Roger - C.1339
- John Walrant - appointed 1349
- John Hethcote - (died 1400)
- John Tutbury - appointed 1400
- Simon Balsham - C.1420
- William of St. Yvo - (died 1438)
- Richard Coventry - appointed 1438
- Thomas - C.1450
- John Smyth - appointed 1476, died 1493
- Robert Mogge - appointed 1493
- John Okeley - surrendered priory in 1536 during Dissolution of the Monasteries

== See also ==
- Castle Gresley
- Church Gresley
- Gresley Baronets
- Lullington, Derbyshire
