= Castle Gresley =

Village in South Derbyshire, England

Coordinates: 52.759°N 1.588°W

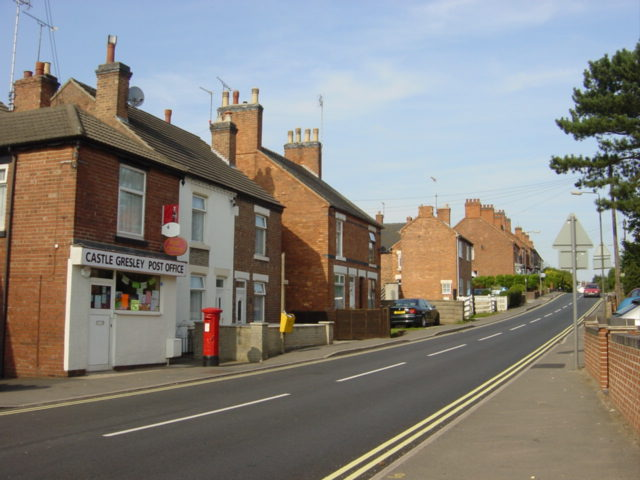
- Linton Road

- Location within Derbyshire
- Population: 1,799 (2011 Census)
- OS grid reference: SK2718
- Civil parish: Castle Gresley
- District: South Derbyshire
- Shire county: Derbyshire
- Region: East Midlands
- Country: England
- Sovereign state: United Kingdom
- Post town: Swadlincote
- Postcode district: DE11
- Dialling code: 01283
- Police: Derbyshire
- Fire: Derbyshire
- Ambulance: East Midlands
- UK Parliament: South Derbyshire

Castle Gresley is a village and civil parish about 1.75 miles (2.82 km) southwest of the centre of Swadlincote in South Derbyshire, England. The population was 1,566 at the 2001 Census increasing to 1,799 at the 2011 Census. The village is about 1 mile (1.6 km) west of the village of Church Gresley.

Castle Gresley has the remains of a motte and bailey castle known locally as Castle Knob.

== Transport ==
In 1849 the Midland Railway opened the Leicester to Burton upon Trent Line through the parish and Gresley railway station at Castle Gresley. The station closed in the 20th century but the line remains open for freight traffic. The station building has been converted to a furniture store.

The village is on the A444 between Overseal (southeast) and Stanton (northwest). It is also connected by unclassified roads to Church Gresley to the east and Linton to the south.

The village has several bus routes available, operated by Diamond East Midlands.
