= Castle Knob =

Medieval remains in Derbyshire, England

Coordinates: 52°45′29″N 1°35′16″W

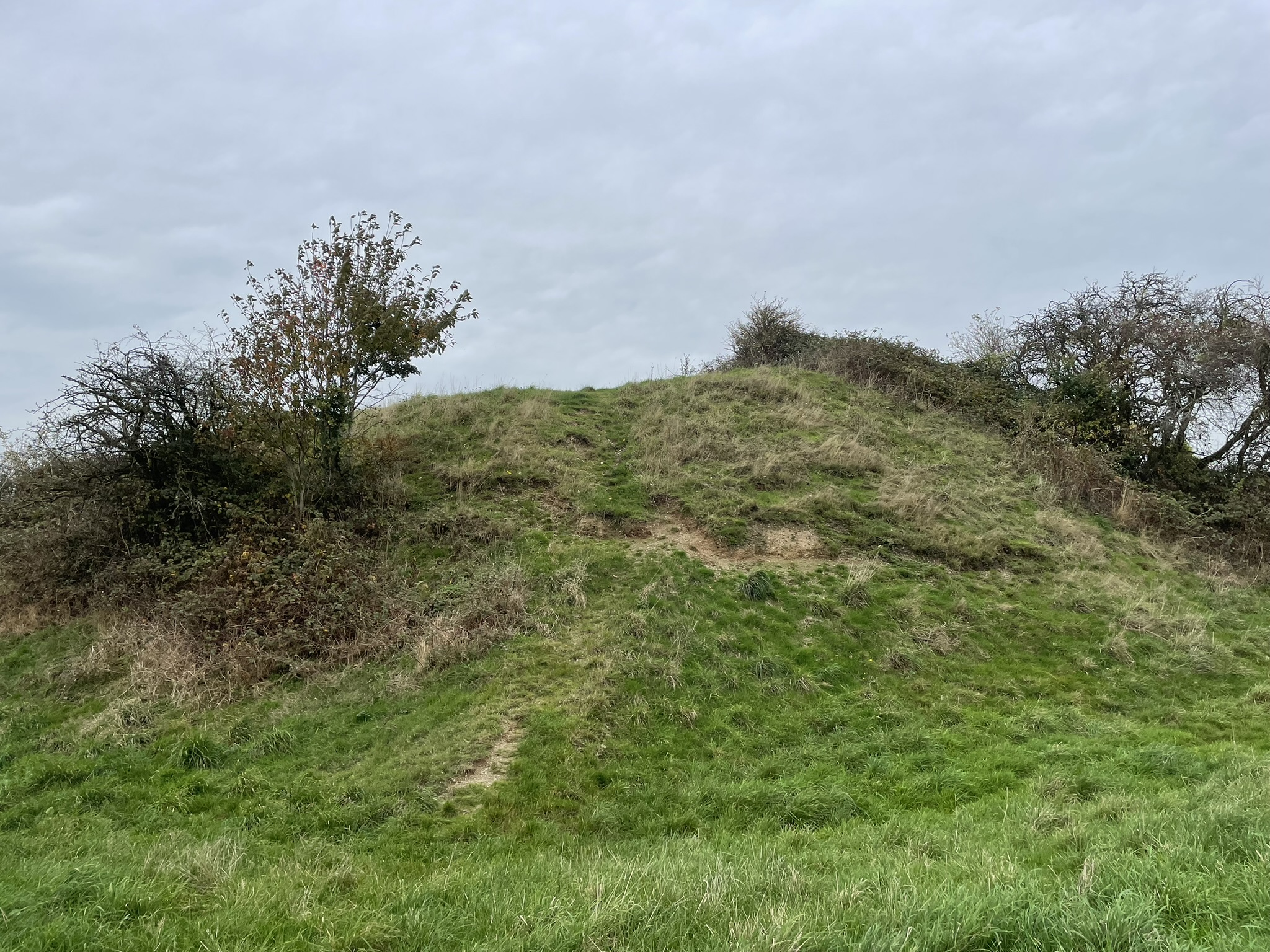
The motte, viewed from the east

Castle Knob is the motte (artificial hill) of Castle Gresley, a ruined motte and bailey castle in Derbyshire, England. The date of construction is not known but may have been in the mid-12th century Anarchy era. The site was long under the ownership of the de Gresley family. The castle survives as earthworks including a 4-metre (13 ft) high motte and three baileys, the largest measuring 70 metres (230 ft) across. The site had been abandoned by the 16th century and, in the mid-20th century, the Royal Observer Corps (ROC) installed a nuclear warfare monitoring post in the central bailey. The site (excluding the ROC post) became a scheduled monument in 1966.

== Description ==
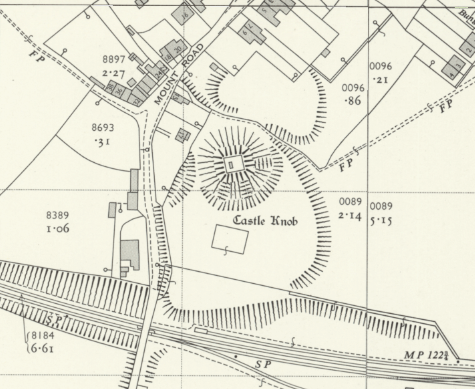
Castle Knob on a mid-20th century map. The rectangle south of the motte is the Royal Observer Corps post, at the bottom of the image is the Burton to Leicester railway line.

The castle site has commanding views over the River Trent to the north and the River Mease to the south. The castle complex is large and generally well preserved; it is thought to retain a lot of archaeological remains. The castle was of the motte and bailey type with a central motte (keep) enclosed with three associated bailey enclosures. The motte sits on a conical hill around 50 metres (160 ft) in diameter at its base and 12 metres (39 ft) at the top. The motte stands around 4 metres (13 ft) high with a portion, around 5 metres (16 ft) in diameter raised still higher and thought to be the location of a tower, since lost. The motte is encircled within a 10-metre (33 ft) wide ditch that is currently around 2 metres (6 ft 7 in) deep. The ditch has been partially filled on the north side with earth arising from a nearby housing development. The motte is linked to a 3-metre (9.8 ft) high mound to the east where a tower once stood, possibly to guard the main entrance to the site.

The motte lies within the central bailey which, at around 70 metres (230 ft) at its widest point, is the largest of the three. The northern bailey is separated from the central bailey by a 2-metre (6 ft 7 in) deep ditch and measures around 40 metres (130 ft) on its longest axis. The southern bailey is separated from the central bailey by a 5-metre (16 ft) wide berm. There is no evidence of earthwork ramparts but each bailey would have been enclosed by a scarp topped with a timber palisade. The remains of a number of structures including a main hall, living quarters, kitchens, workshops, stables and paddocks lie within the baileys. A modern shed and stable stand on part of the north bailey.

== History ==
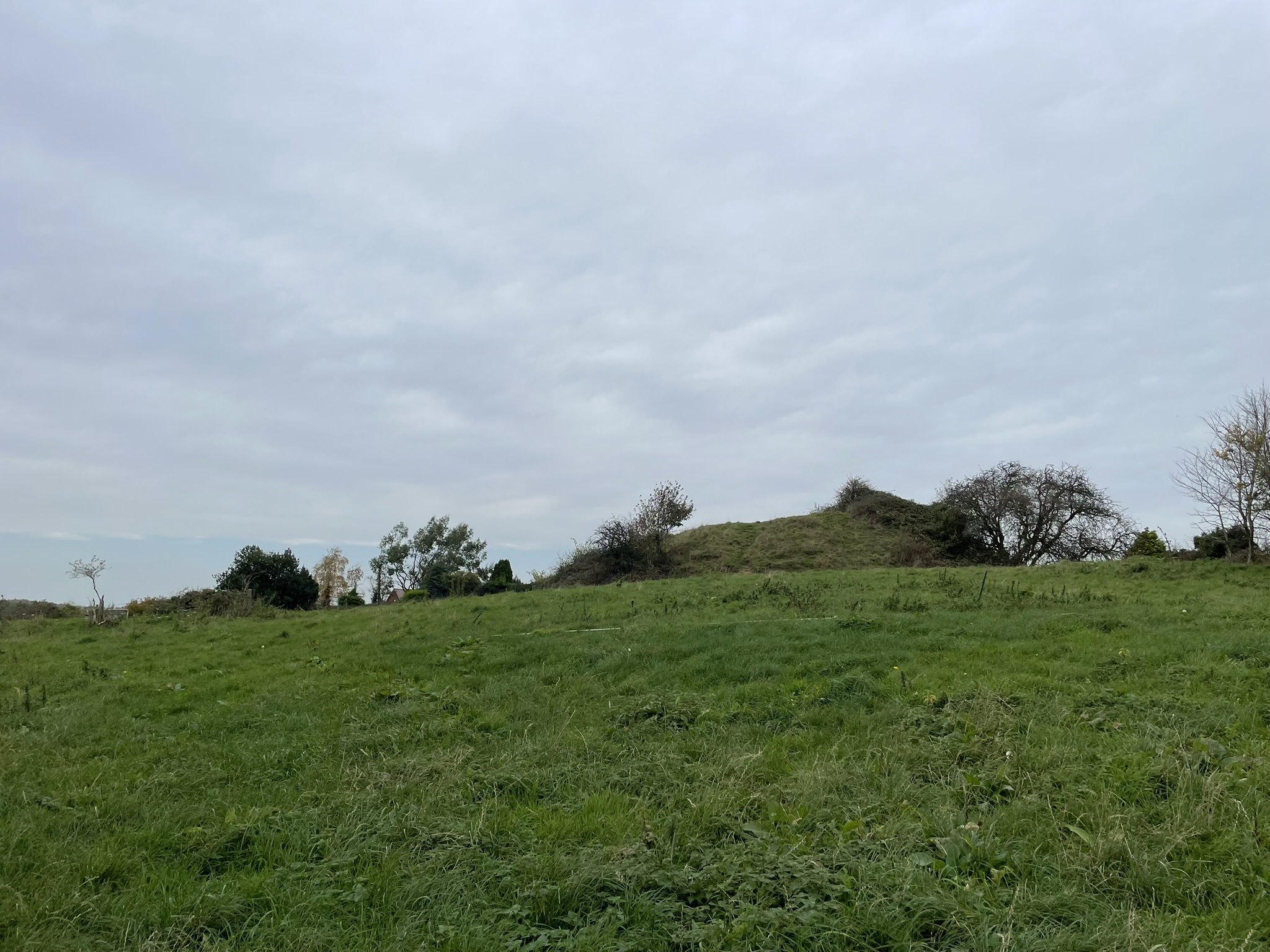
The motte viewed from the south-east, looking across the central bailey from the scarp

The castle is similar in style to those constructed during the 12th century but does not appear in the historic record until the 14th century so its date of construction is unknown. A 2007 South Derbyshire District Council plaque on the site notes that it pre-dates 1252 when the nearby settlement is first described as "Castelgresele", being named after the castle, but may even have been abandoned by this time. The land was owned by the de Gresley family and Georgian antiquarian Daniel Lysons wrote that they took their name from the settlement. The de Gresleys were descended from Nigel de Stafford (son of Robert de Stafford), who held the area at the time of Domesday in 1086. The family had adopted the de Gresley name by 1166.

The plaque on the site notes that it is possibly an illegal castle (ie. built without a licence to crenellate from the monarch) constructed during the mid-12th century Anarchy which saw conflict between forces loyal to Stephen of Blois and those loyal to Empress Matilda over their rights to take the English throne. At this time the landowner would have been William de Gresley who also founded Gresley Priory, located around 1 mile (1.6 km) from the site. If the castle was constructed in the Norman era it would be one of the few surviving from that period in Derbyshire.

In 1582 the antiquarian William Camden noted that remains of a mansion were visible on the site but that the de Gresleys had long abandoned the castle to live at nearby Drakelow. Drakelow had long been linked to the de Gresleys; by 1330 Geoffrey de Gresley had the right to use gallows both at Drakelow and Castle Gresley. The castle remained in the ownership of the de Gresley family until at least the end of the 19th century.

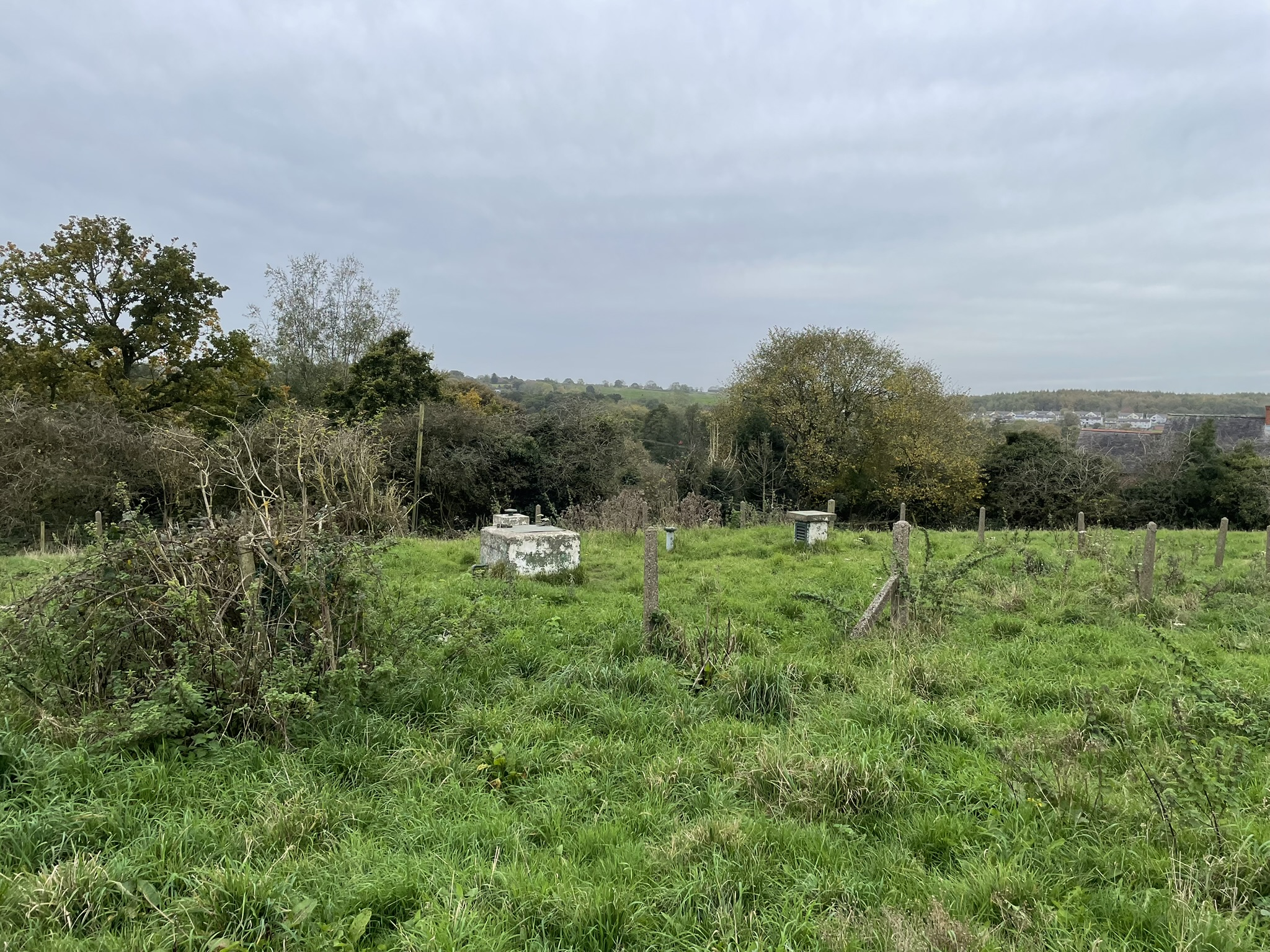
Above ground remains of the ROC post

During the 19th century the Midland Railway built the Burton to Leicester railway line to the south of the site and erected Gresley railway station to the east. Shortly after the Second World War the Royal Observer Corps (ROC) installed an underground nuclear warfare monitoring post in the central bailey. The plaque on the site notes that the ROC lowered the motte slightly to widen the platform and allow them to better install monitoring equipment atop it. The site received statutory protection by listing as a scheduled monument on 31 August 1966; the site of the now-disused ROC monitoring post is excluded from the listing.
