= Arthur Clamp =

English footballer

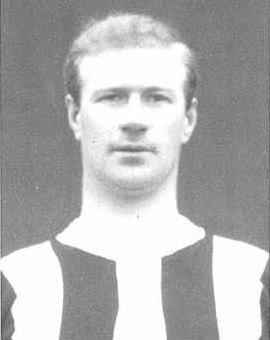
- Clamp while a Notts County player.

Personal information
- Full name: Arthur Clamp
- Date of birth: 1 May 1884
- Place of birth: Sneinton, England
- Date of death: 19 September 1918 (aged 34)
- Place of death: Stoke-on-Trent, England
- Height: 5 ft 8 in (1.73 m)
- Position: Centre half

Senior career*
Years	Team	Apps	(Gls)
- Sneinton
1906–1915	Notts County	275	(3)
- * Club domestic league appearances and goals

Arthur Clamp (1 May 1884 – 19 September 1918) was an English professional footballer who made over 270 appearances in the Football League for Notts County. A centre half, "he possessed remarkable stamina and above all, excelled as a breaker-up of combination".

== Personal life ==
The son of Thomas and Caroline Clamp, Clamp worked as a bricklayer and was married with children. In April 1918, during the final year of the First World War, Clamp was called up to serve as a private in the British Army. After a period with the Sherwood Foresters, he was transferred to the 7th Battalion, Queen's Royal Regiment (West Surrey) upon his arrival in France. Within three days of his arrival in the trenches, he was seriously wounded at Trônes Wood during the Second Battle of the Somme. Clamp was evacuated to Britain, where he died in Stoke-on-Trent Military Hospital on 19 September 1918. He was buried with military honours in Church Cemetery, Nottingham.

His great-grandson Steve Clamp became a journalist and presenter.

== Career statistics ==
Appearances and goals by club, season and competition
Club	Season	League			FA Cup		Total	
Club	Season	Division	Apps	Goals	Apps	Goals	Apps	Goals
Notts County	1914–15	First Division	24	0	0	0	24	0
Career total			24	0	0	0	24	0

== Honours ==
Notts County

- Football League Second Division: 1913–14
