= Steve Clamp =

English broadcast journalist and presenter

Steven Robert "Steve" Clamp (born 3 January 1978) in Chichester, West Sussex) is an English broadcast journalist and presenter who is currently with ITV News.

== Career ==
In 1994 his first television role was as a presenter of a children’s tv series. He began freelancing as a presenter but also worked as a cameraman, editor, presenter and reporter for Chelsea TV. In 1998 he 'transferred' and became a senior reporter for Manchester United TV. In 2000 he began presenting for Sky Sports News and on occasions Sky News; whilst also presenting a weekly phone-in for Manchester United TV.

In January 2002, he joined the BBC West Midlands regional news programme Midlands Today as a senior sports reporter, he also regularly stood in for host Nick Owen.

In May 2005, he moved ITV Central as co-presenter of ITV News Central in the East Midlands. On 20 February 2009 he left the station.

He then freelanced with ITN, appearing on the ITV News at 5:30, ITV News London and Setanta Sports News.

In October 2009 he rejoined ITV News Central as the Sports Correspondent.

As of 5 July 2022, Clamp is co-presenter of ITV News Central in the East & West Midlands, succeeding Bob Warman.

== Filmography ==
Year	Title	Role	Notes
1994–1996	TCC (The children's channel)	Tiny and Crew (Under pseudonym Steve Roberts)	
1995–1998	Chelsea TV	Presenter and reporter	Cameraman and editor
1998–2000	Manchester United TV	Senior sports reporter	
2000–2002	Manchester United TV	Presenter	
2000–2002	Sky Sports News	Sports presenter	
2000–2002	Sky News	Sports presenter	
2002–2005	Midlands Today	Senior sports reporter	
2005	Inside Out	Himself	Single episode
2005–	ITV News Central	East Midlands main presenter (2005–2009), Sports Correspondent (2009–2022), East & West Midlands main presenter (2022–)	Lead role
2009–2012	ITV News at 5:30	News presenter	
2009–2012	ITV News London	News presenter	
2009	Setanta Sports News	Sports presenter	

== Personal life ==
Clamp grew up in Havant, near Portsmouth. His great-grandfather was professional footballer Arthur Clamp, who died of wounds suffered during the course of his service in World War I. His first work in tv came about when he landed a children’s TV show following his first ever screen test. He later moved into entertainment before using his journalism qualifications to move into news and sport, working for Sky sports, Sky News, the BBC, ITN and ITV, both nationally and regionally. On 21 February 2005 the BBC West Midlands regional programme Inside Out revealed that Steve and his then wife had suffered two previous miscarriages. Steve lives in Worcestershire with his three children.

Steve Clamp was previously married to Clare Cartwright-Clamp and later married Lindsay Kaye Clamp. He is a father of three children: Emma Reethi, Ben, and Lilly Anne.
