= Paula Clamp =

British writer

Paula Clamp (born 1967 in Worksop, Nottinghamshire, England) is an Irish writer known for her adult and young adult novels. Her first two novels, Standing in a Hammock and Beetle Mania, were bestsellers in Ireland.

== Education ==
Clamp has master's degrees in Cultural Management and Anglo-Irish Literature.

== Career ==
Clamp is a novelist, playwright, and screenwriter. Her novels are considered humorous chick lit. Her works for theatre have been performed in Dublin and Belfast.

Clamp has held the post of Arts Officer for North Down Borough Council. She conducts writing workshops and has been a Visiting Lecturer at the University of Ulster.

She has been represented by Poolbeg (Dublin) and Curtis Brown Agency (London).

== Bibliography ==
=== Novels ===
- Standing in a Hammock (2002), ISBN 978-1-84223-096-1
- Beetle Mania (2003), ISBN 978-1-84223-090-9
- The Shee (2012)
- Liberty Tree (2012)
- Miss, Mrs or Ms (2014)
- Love Is...Four Letters (2014)
- She's Going Places (2019)
- Big English Girl (2019)
- Where Do Dead Birds Go (2023)

=== Plays ===
- Jack's Too Open (1997)
