= The Tabletop Group =

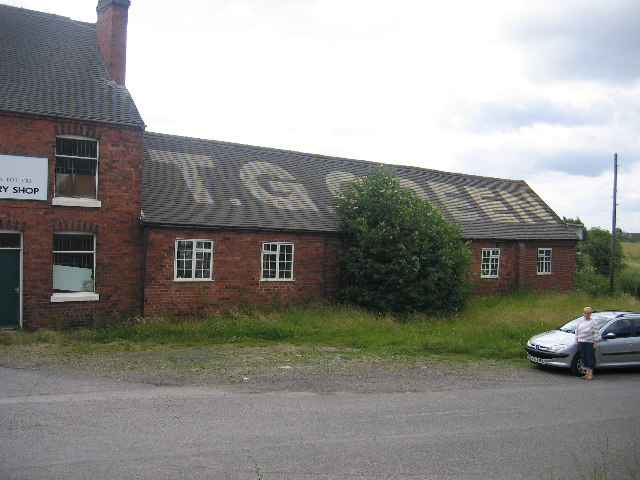
Part of T. G. Green's factory near Swadlincote

The Tabletop Group was based in Nottinghamshire, England, and comprised three companies: The Tabletop Company, Mason Cash, and T. G. Green. The group was formed in April 2004 when The Tabletop Company purchased Mason Cash, which had previously purchased T. G. Green in 2001. The Tabletop Group went into administration in 2007 and the receivers dismantled and sold off the factory and goods.

The group manufactured kitchenware and tableware for sale mostly in Europe, North America, and Oceania.

== See also ==
- Cornishware
