= Riser clamp =

Hardware item used to support vertical runs of piping

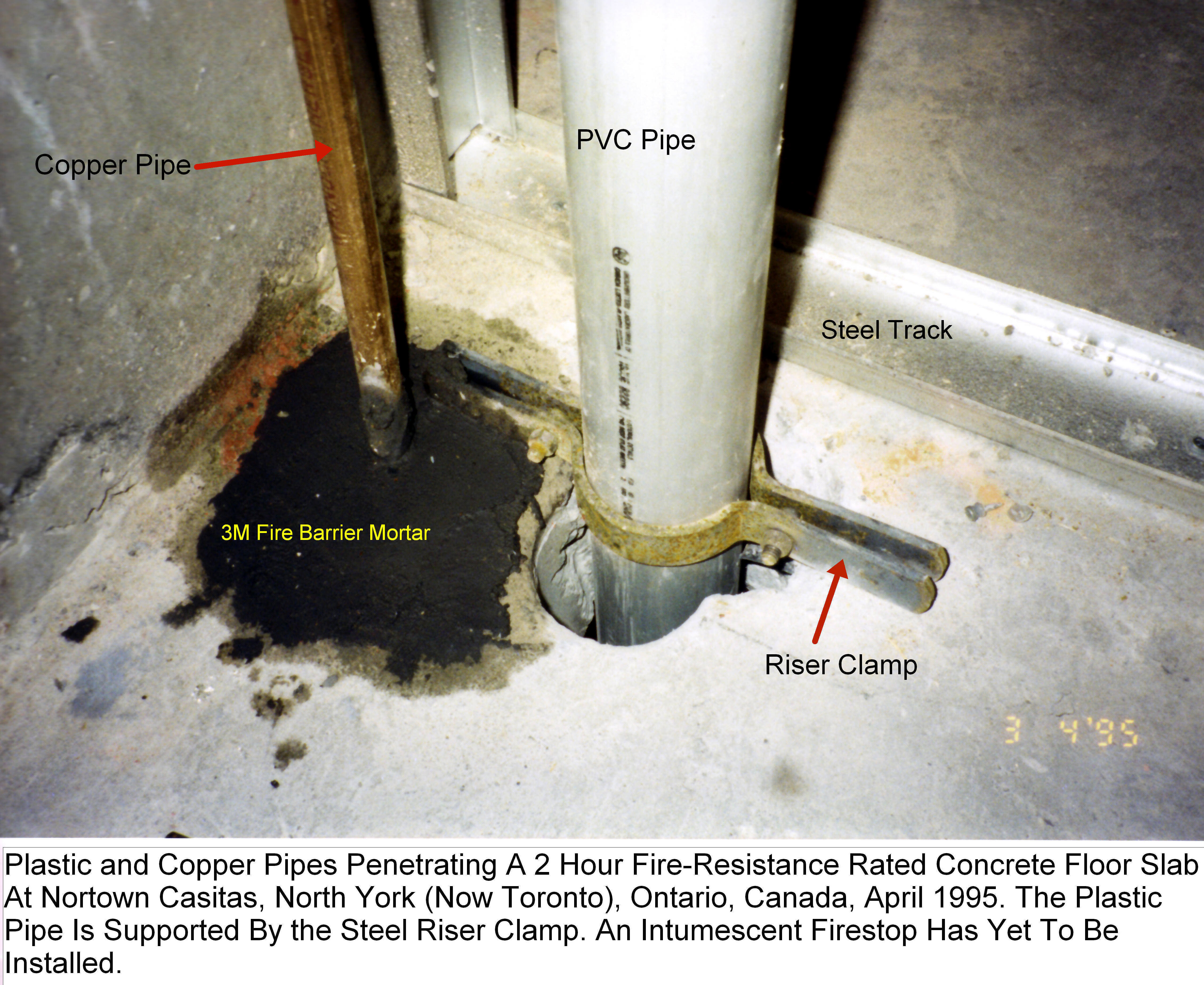
Riser Clamp holding plastic pipe, penetrating through a concrete floor slab. The copper pipe penetration is firestopped with firestop mortar.

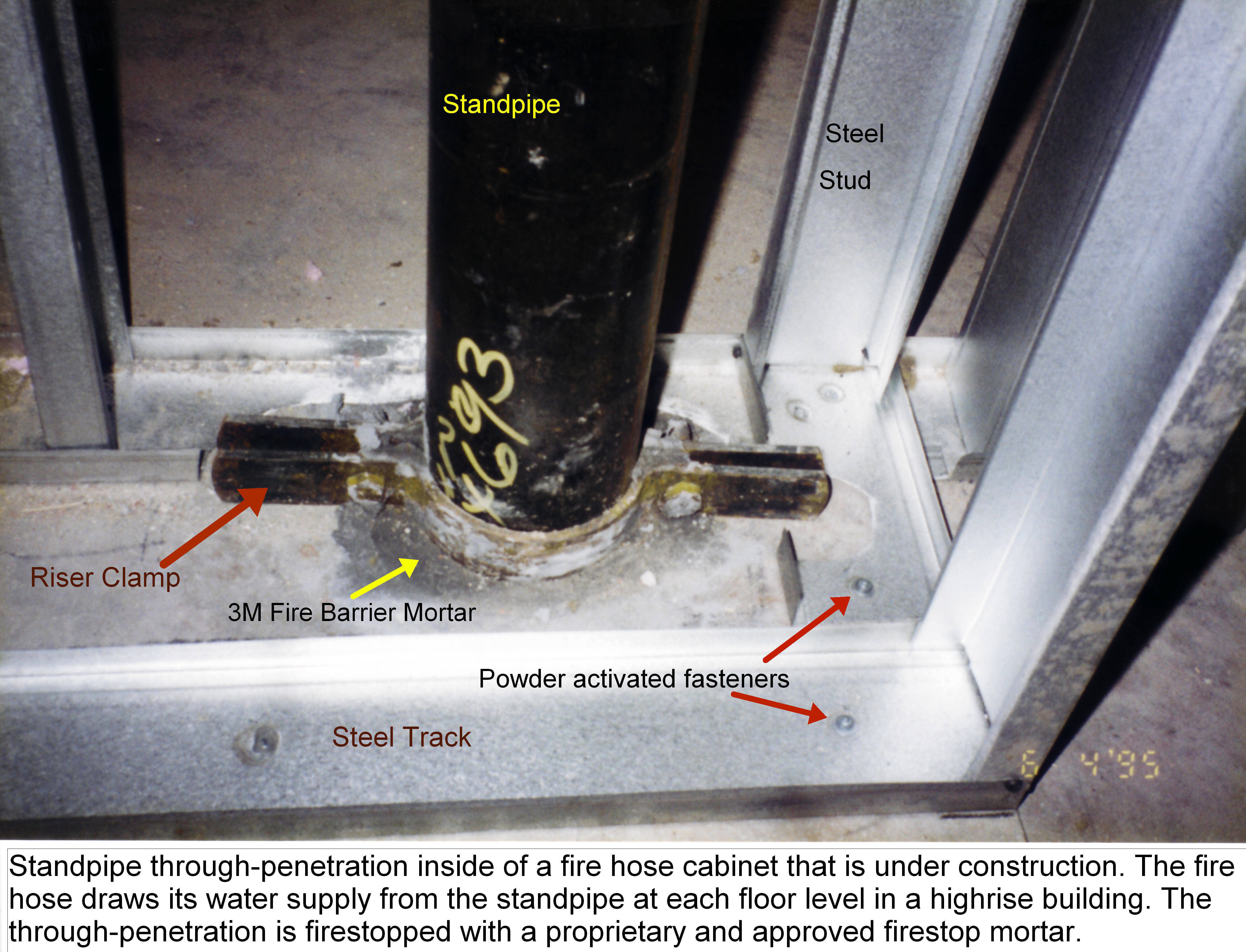
Riser clamp for a standpipe through-penetration firestop inside a fire hose cabinet under construction

A riser clamp is a type of hardware used by mechanical building trades for pipe support in vertical runs of piping (risers) at each floor level. The devices are placed around the pipe, and integral fasteners are then tightened to clamp them onto the pipe. The friction between the pipe and riser clamp transfers the weight of the pipe through the riser clamp to the building structure. Risers are generally located at floor penetrations, particularly for continuous floor slabs such as concrete. They may also be located at some other interval as dictated by local building codes or at intermediate intervals to support plumbing which has been altered or repaired. Heavier piping types, such as cast iron, require more frequent support. Ordinarily, riser clamps are made of carbon steel and individually sized to fit certain pipe sizes.

There are at least two types of riser clamp: the two-bolt pipe clamp and the yoke clamp.
