= Ted Clamp =

English footballer

Personal information
- Full name: Edward Clamp
- Date of birth: 13 November 1922
- Place of birth: Church Gresley, England
- Date of death: 1990 (aged 65–66)
- Place of death: Church Gresley, England
- Position: Goalkeeper

Youth career
- John Knowles
- Moira United

Senior career*
Years	Team	Apps	(Gls)
1938–1947	Gresley Rovers	12	(0)
1947–1949	Derby County	1	(0)
1949–1950	Oldham Athletic	3	(0)
1950–195?	Buxton		
- * Club domestic league appearances and goals

Edward Clamp (13 November 1922 – 2 June 1990) was an English footballer who played as a goalkeeper for Derby County and Oldham Athletic in the Football League.
