= Cornishware =

Kitchenware brand

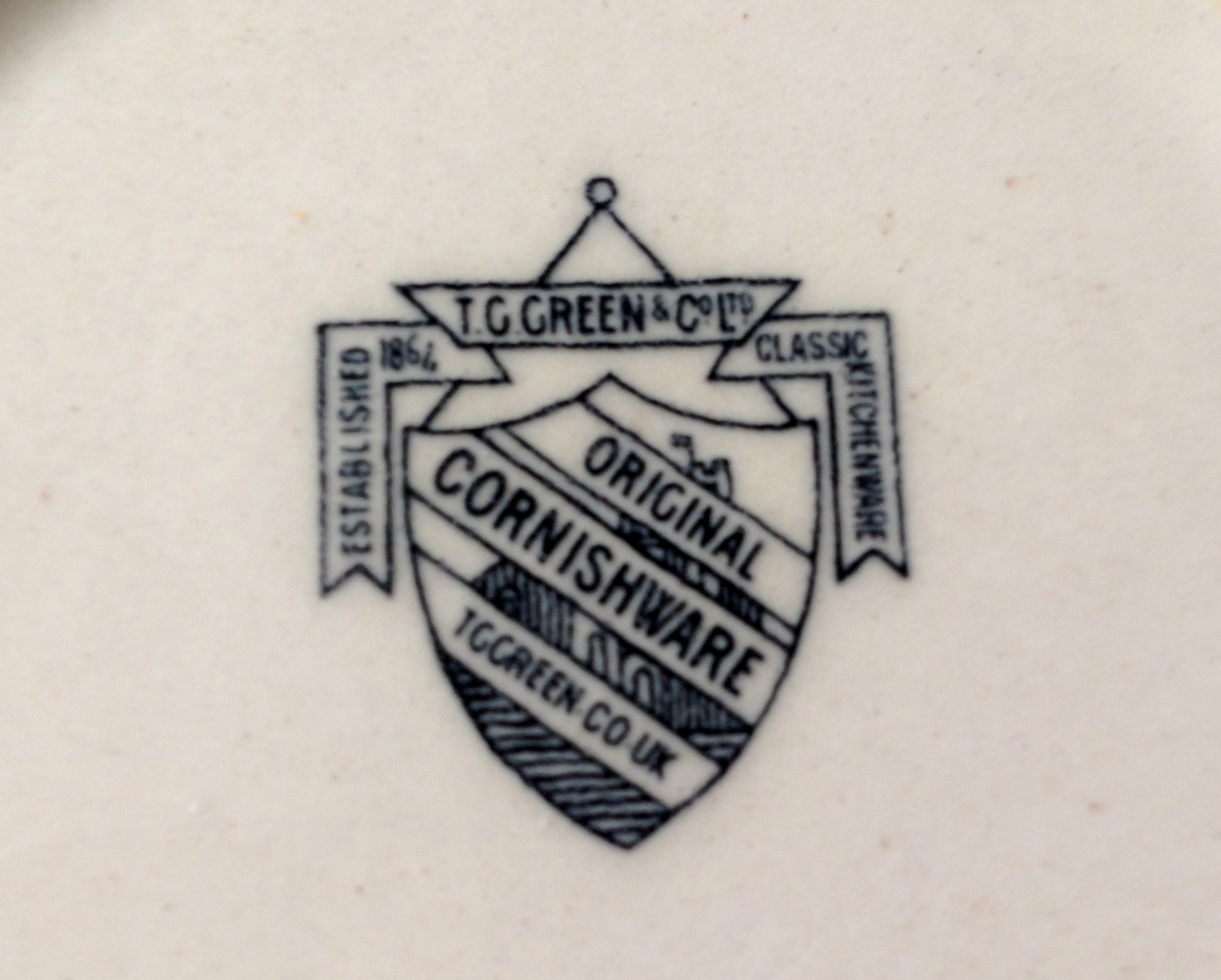
'Shield' backstamp for contemporary Cornishware by T. G. Green

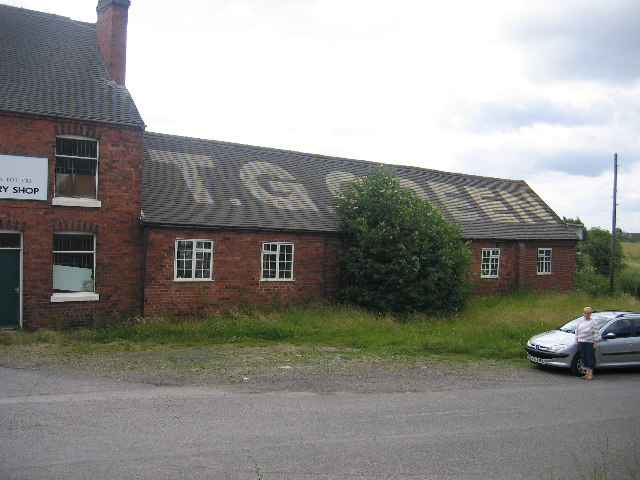
Part of the T. G. Green factory

Cornishware is a striped kitchenware brand trademarked to and manufactured by T. G. Green & Co Ltd.

Originally introduced in the 1920s and manufactured in Church Gresley, Derbyshire, it was a huge success for the company and in the succeeding 30 years it was exported around the world. The company ceased production in June 2007 when the factory closed under the ownership of parent company The Tabletop Group. The range was revived in 2009 after T. G. Green was bought by a trio of British investors.

== Name ==
The name "Cornish Kitchenware" was said to have come from an observation by a T.G Green salesmen that the blue colour used to decorate the dishware reminded him of the sky and sea in Cornwall. However, the T. G. Green Museum have now disproved this as travel to Cornwall from Church Gresley at that time was virtually impossible. Cornwall was however the initial source for the clay to make the blue slip applied to the pottery.

== History ==
T. G. Green & Co was founded by Thomas Goodwin Green of Boston, Lincolnshire in around 1864. Having made a fortune in Australia, Green returned to England to marry Mary Tenniel, the sister of Punch and Alice's Adventures in Wonderland illustrator Sir John Tenniel. He bought an existing pottery in Church Gresley from Henry Wileman, while on honeymoon in Scarborough

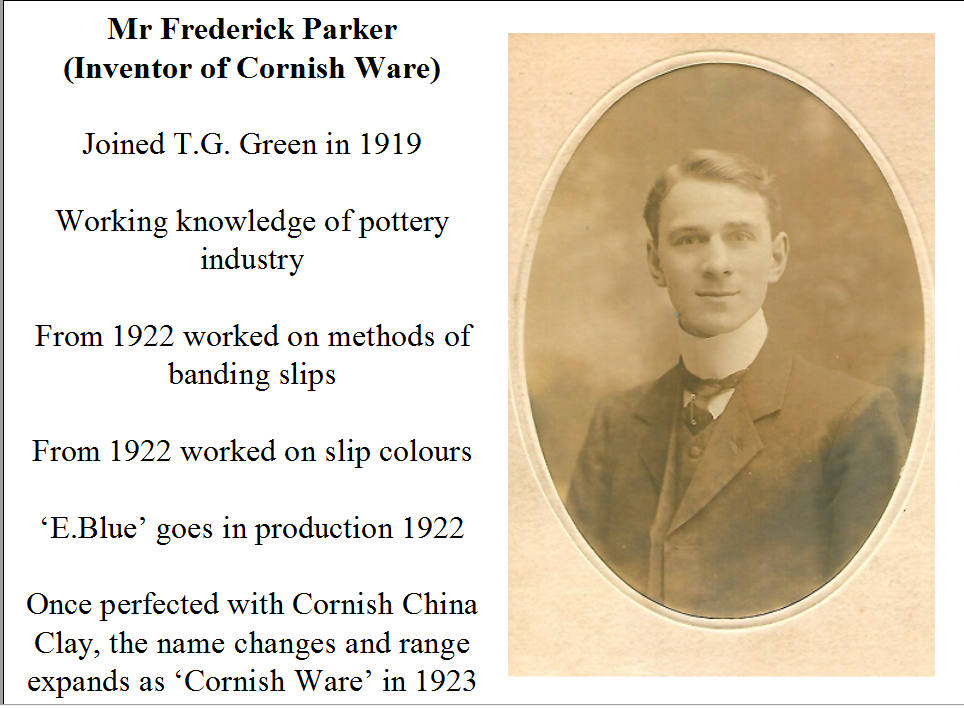
Frederick Parker

The exact date that Cornishware was created is unclear, but it is known to have been introduced by Frederick Parker who joined Green's as a General Manager in 1919. Initially he introduced E-Blue Banded Wares, selling in china shops in 1922. The earliest mention of Cornishware by name is in a T. G. Green Trade Catalogue dated 1923. By the 1930s, the range was well established with a thriving export business. The pottery was widely sold throughout the UK through major department stores and independent shops.

Cornishware stockists carried a standard range of lettered jars, such as flour, sugar, salt, currants, sultanas, raisins, tea and coffee, but purchasers could request jars with customised wording (for instance, paprika, arrowroot, thyme, mace, viota, macaroni). The retailer would then send a request slip to the factory and customised jars would be created then sent back to the store. T. G. Green never kept records of these requests, so there is no complete list of customised jars produced.

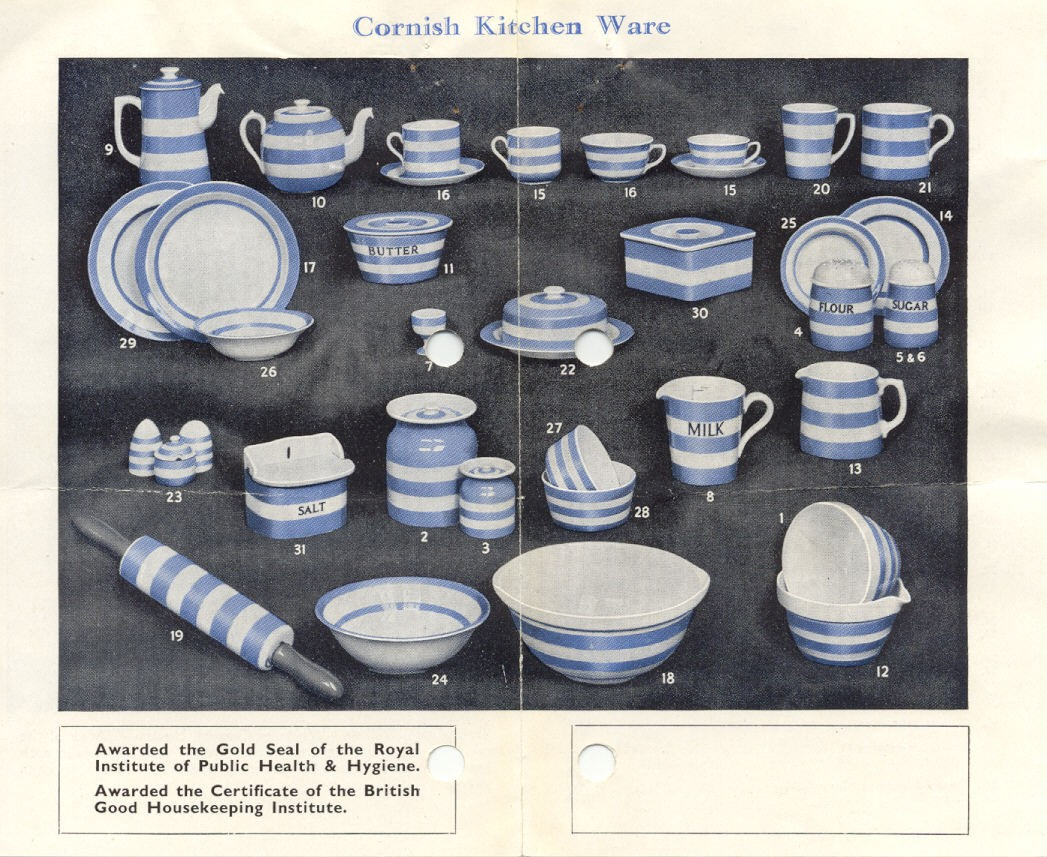
Former kitchenware range

The signature colour was referred to as 'E.blue' – meaning electric blue. and in 1959 Sunlit Yellow was introduced to the range. In the 1960s new designers were brought in from the Royal College of Art – Scandinavian designer Berit Ternell and, most notably, Judith Onions. She restyled the Cornishware range to give it the distinctive shapes that are still in use today. Some of Onions' designs are held in the V&A collection, as part of the Ceramics Study Galleries.

== Cornishware today ==
After the Church Gresley factory closed in 2007, designer Perry Haydn Taylor and 'lifelong admirers' Charles Rickards and Paul Burston restored the brand.

Today the new T. G. Green produces a range of Cornishware products in various colours, including the traditional blue and white stripes.

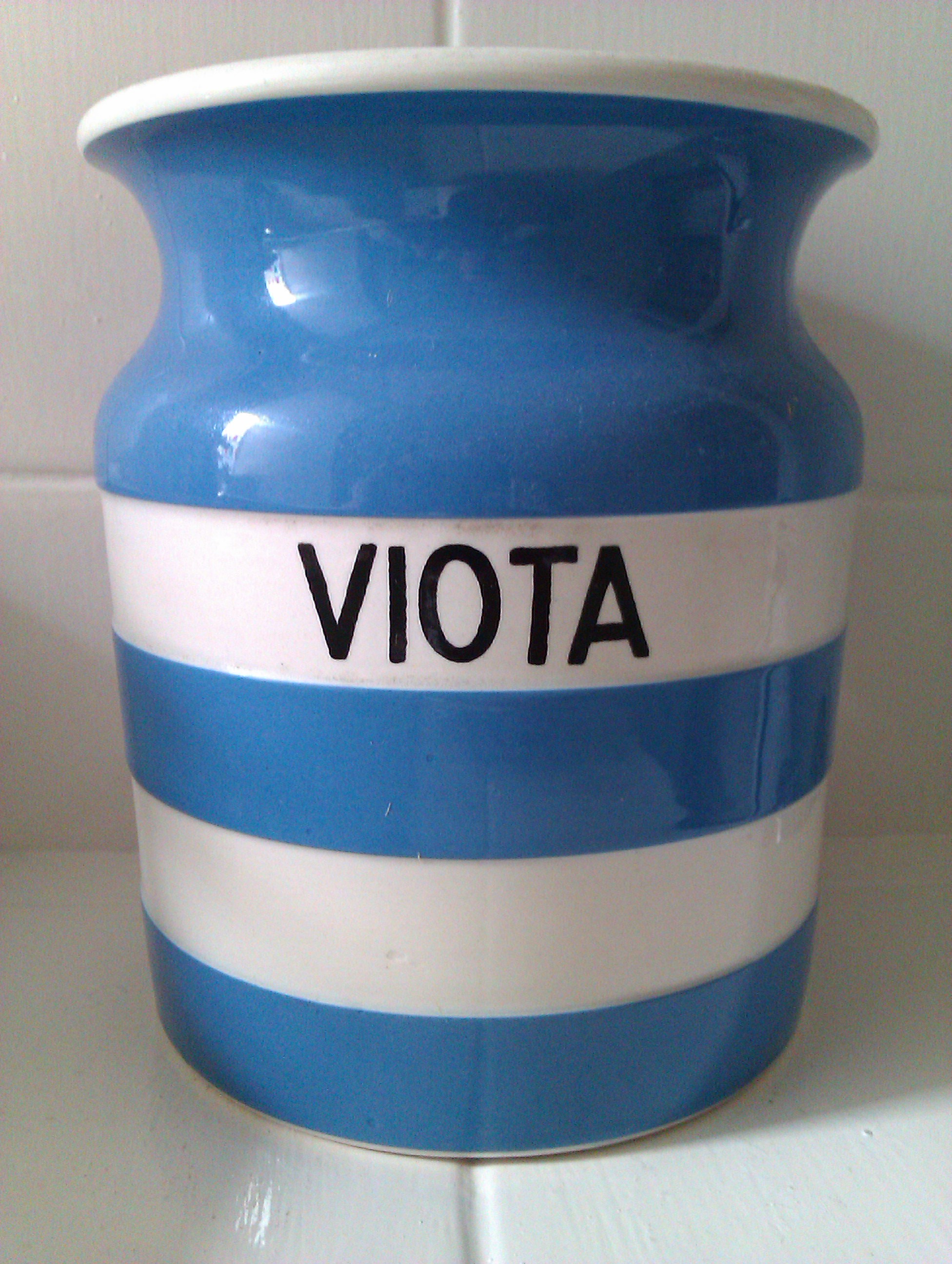
A vintage Cornishware jar bearing the name 'Viota' (a company that manufactured boxed lemonade mix, cake mix and desiccated coconut )

Original vintage Cornishware can be collectible, with pieces in black, green, orange, yellow, red, and blue pieces with rare lettering, selling for high prices.

A number of active Facebook groups as well as Pinterest sites and the appearance of Cornishware on many British television shows, ranging from The Great British Bake Off to The Young Ones have kept Cornishware in the public eye and popular. Cornishware was extensively used in the 2015 film adaptation of Alan Bennett's The Lady in the Van.
