= Leicestershire and Rutland =

- Proposed unitary authority area
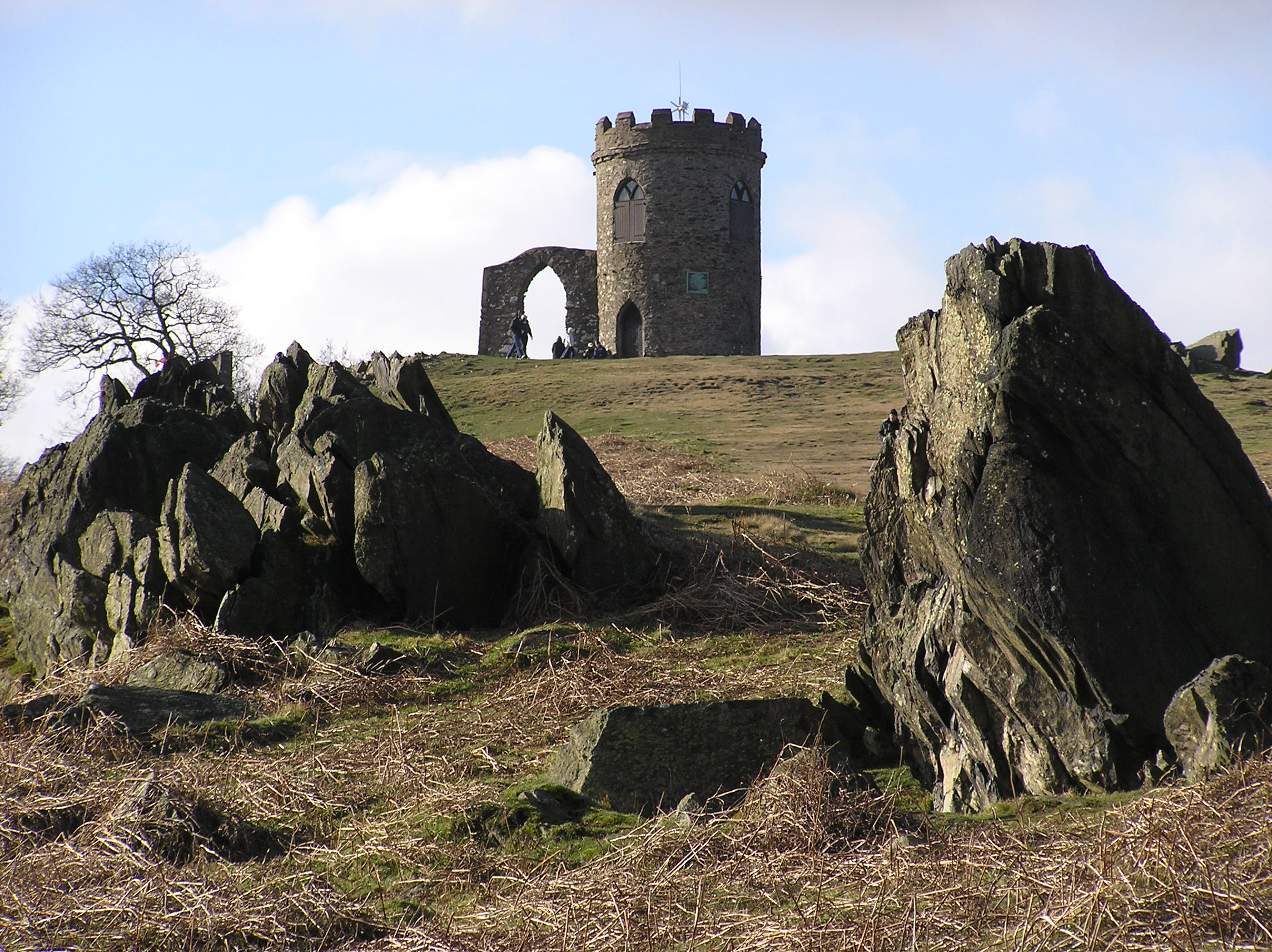
- Old John

- Interactive map
- Coordinates: 52.7721°N 1.2061°W
- Sovereign state: United Kingdom
- Country: England
- Region: East Midlands
- Ceremonial county: Leicestershire and Rutland

Government
  - Type: Unitary authority
  - Body: Leicestershire and Rutland Council

Population (2024 estimate)
  - Total: 562,274
- Time zone: UTC+0 (GMT)
  - Summer (DST): UTC+1 (BST)

Leicestershire and Rutland was a proposed unitary authority area in the ceremonial counties of Leicestershire and Rutland, England. It was planned to be formed on 1 April 2028 but in September 2026, proposals were halted by the government and placed under review. The largest settlement would be Loughborough, and it would also include Ashby-de-la-Zouch, Coalville, Hinckley, Lutterworth, Market Harborough, Melton Mowbray, Oakham, and Uppingham. In October 2026, plans to create it were withdrawn.

== Formation ==
It would be formed from the existing two-tier Leicestershire districts of Hinckley and Bosworth, Melton and North West Leicestershire and the existing unitary authority of Rutland, with portions of Blaby, Charnwood and Harborough districts.

The remaining portions of those districts would form part of an enlarged Leicester.

Leicestershire and Rutland was proposed as part of ongoing local government changes throughout England, in which all areas of the country that have separate county councils and district councils would see those replaced with single-tier, or unitary, local governance. The alternative proposal for two unitaries for the Leicester, Leicestershire and Rutland area, and the proposal for three unitaries were not accepted.

The council would have had shadow elections in May 2027 and come into full existence on April 2028. In September 2026 the government announced that the proposals were being placed on hold for a review of the process; local elections in May 2027 will take place for the existing local authorities. In October 2026, plans to create it were withdrawn. The decision was threatened with judicial review by five of the Leicestershire district councils.

== Governance ==
It was planned to be run by Leicestershire and Rutland Council, which would have comprised 94 councillors.

== Parishes ==
Coalville, Hinckley, Loughborough, Market Harborough, Melton Mowbray and the Thringstone area are currently unparished, the rest of the area is parished. In Charnwood, a civil parish will be created for Loughborough in 2027, as well as a new parish for the new Broadnook development, which will be formed out of part of the existing Rothley, Thurcaston and Cropston and Wanlip parishes. In Harborough a parish council for Market Harborough is under consideration.

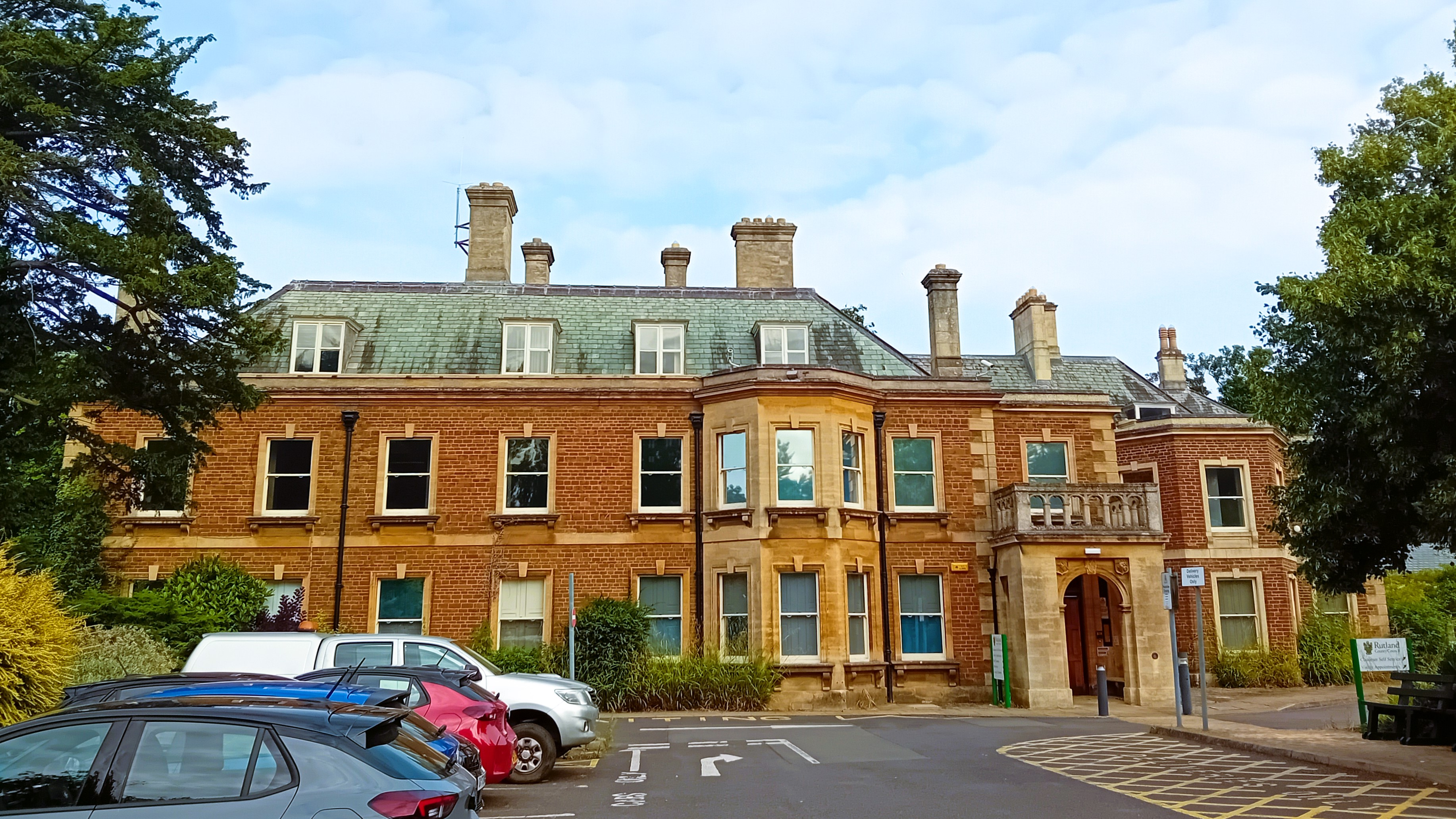
Catmose House, the headquarters of Rutland County Council

The unitary authority would have included the following civil parishes:

In Blaby

- Croft
- Elmesthorpe
- Potters Marston
- Sapcote
- Sharnford
- Stoney Stanton
- Thorpe Astley
- Wigston Parva

In Charnwood

- Anstey
- Barrow upon Soar
- Broadnook (Note: to be created in 2027)
- Burton on the Wolds
- Cossington
- Cotes
- East Goscote
- Hathern
- Hoton
- Loughborough
- Mountsorrel
- Newtown Linford
- Prestwold
- Quorn
- Ratcliffe on the Wreake
- Rearsby
- Rothley
- Seagrave
- Shepshed
- Sileby
- South Croxton
- Stonebow Village
- Swithland
- Thrussington
- Ulverscroft
- Walton on the Wolds
- Woodhouse
- Wymeswold

In Harborough

- Allexton
- Arnesby
- Ashby Magna
- Ashby Parva
- Billesdon
- Bitteswell with Bittesby
- Blaston
- Bringhurst
- Broughton Astley
- Bruntingthorpe
- Burton Overy
- Carlton Curlieu
- Catthorpe
- Claybrooke Magna
- Claybrooke Parva
- Cold Newton
- Cotesbach
- Cranoe
- Drayton
- Dunton Bassett
- East Langton
- East Norton
- Fleckney
- Foxton
- Frisby
- Frolesworth
- Gaulby
- Gilmorton
- Glooston
- Goadby
- Great Bowden
- Great Easton
- Gumley
- Hallaton
- Horninghold
- Houghton on the Hill
- Hungarton
- Husbands Bosworth
- Illston on the Hill
- Keyham
- Kibworth Beauchamp
- Kibworth Harcourt
- Kimcote and Walton
- King's Norton
- Knaptoft
- Laughton
- Launde
- Leire
- Loddington
- Lowesby
- Lubenham
- Lutterworth
- Marefield
- Medbourne
- Misterton with Walcote
- Mowsley
- Nevill Holt
- North Kilworth
- Noseley
- Owston and Newbold
- Peatling Magna
- Peatling Parva
- Rolleston
- Saddington
- Shangton
- Shawell
- Shearsby
- Skeffington
- Slawston
- Smeeton Westerby
- South Kilworth
- Stockerston
- Stonton Wyville
- Swinford
- Theddingworth
- Thorpe Langton
- Tilton on the Hill and Halstead
- Tugby and Keythorpe
- Tur Langton
- Ullesthorpe
- Welham
- West Langton
- Westrill and Starmore
- Withcote

In Rutland
