= Charles Jenner (writer) =

English writer and poet

The Reverend Charles Jenner
- Vicar of Claybrook

Personal details
- Baptised: 1 May 1736
- Died: 11 May 1774 Claybrook, Leicestershire
- Denomination: Anglican
- Spouse: Rebecca Thomson (m. 1764)
- Education: Pembroke Hall, Cam. Sidney Sussex College, Cam.

Charles Jenner (1736–1774) was an English poet, novelist and Anglican cleric.

== Origins ==
Charles Jenner was the eldest son of Charles Jenner, DD (1707–1770), and Mary his wife, daughter of John Sawyer of Heywood, Berkshire. His father, a grandson of Sir Thomas Jenner, Baron of the Exchequer, was a graduate of Brasenose College, Oxford (BA 1727, MA 1730, and BD and DD 1743), and became rector of Buckworth, Huntingdonshire, in 1740; chaplain to George II in 1746; prebendary of Lincoln in 1753; and archdeacon of Bedford in 1756, and of Huntingdon in 1757. Finances were always a problem, and pecuniary embarrassments ultimately forced him to leave the country. The fault was seemingly his own, since he "ran into debt with everyone; … and, at last … was forced to leave England". (Note: Nichols, Literary Anecdotes, p. 810.) He died at St. Omer on 2 February 1770. He published a single sermon in 1753. A portrait came into the possession of his great-grandson, Herbert Jenner-Fust, Esq., LL.D, of Hill Court, Gloucestershire.

== Life ==
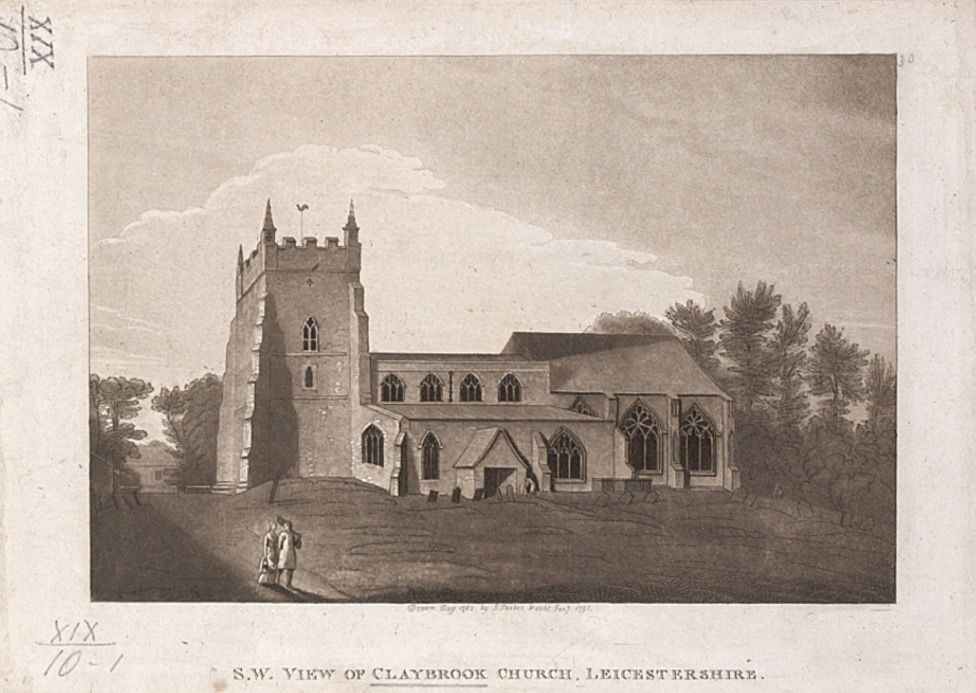
Southwest view of Claybrook church, Leicestershire

Charles Jenner was baptised at St. Clement Danes, London, on 1 May 1736. He was admitted as a pensioner at Pembroke Hall, Cambridge, on 14 April 1753, graduating BA in 1757 and MA in 1760; but subsequently migrated to Sidney Sussex College on 19 December 1763.

In 1769, Jenner was instituted to the living of Claybrook in Leicestershire, which he obtained a dispensation to hold with that of Craneford St. John in Northamptonshire. His father's financial imprudence, Cole suggests, "much hurt him", and according to Nichols he himself was "of an opposite turn" and cautious with money. (Note: Nichols, Literary Anecdotes, p. 810.)

Angus Macaulay in his History of Claybrook, 1791, says that Jenner "had a fine taste for music, and his society was much courted by amateurs of that art", and according to Nichols he was "a good singer of catches and performer at concerts". He was "humane and benevolent", with manners "soft and gentle, affable and condescending". (Note: Nichols, Literary Anecdotes, p. 564.) He composed and published a song entitled The Syren, and in his novel The Placid Man, and other of his writings, showed much knowledge of music and musical literature. According to the historian of his parish, his character, manners, and talents were of a high order.

Jenner died at Claybrook on 11 May 1774, aged 38. Cole recounts that "he had been at London, and at Vauxhall, and, being of a consumptive constitution, caught cold, and went home ill". (Note: Nichols, Literary Anecdotes, p. 810.) A monument was erected to his memory in Claybrook church by Lady Craven, with commemorative verses of her own. In 1764 he married Rebecca, daughter of William Thomson, but left no issue.

== Works ==
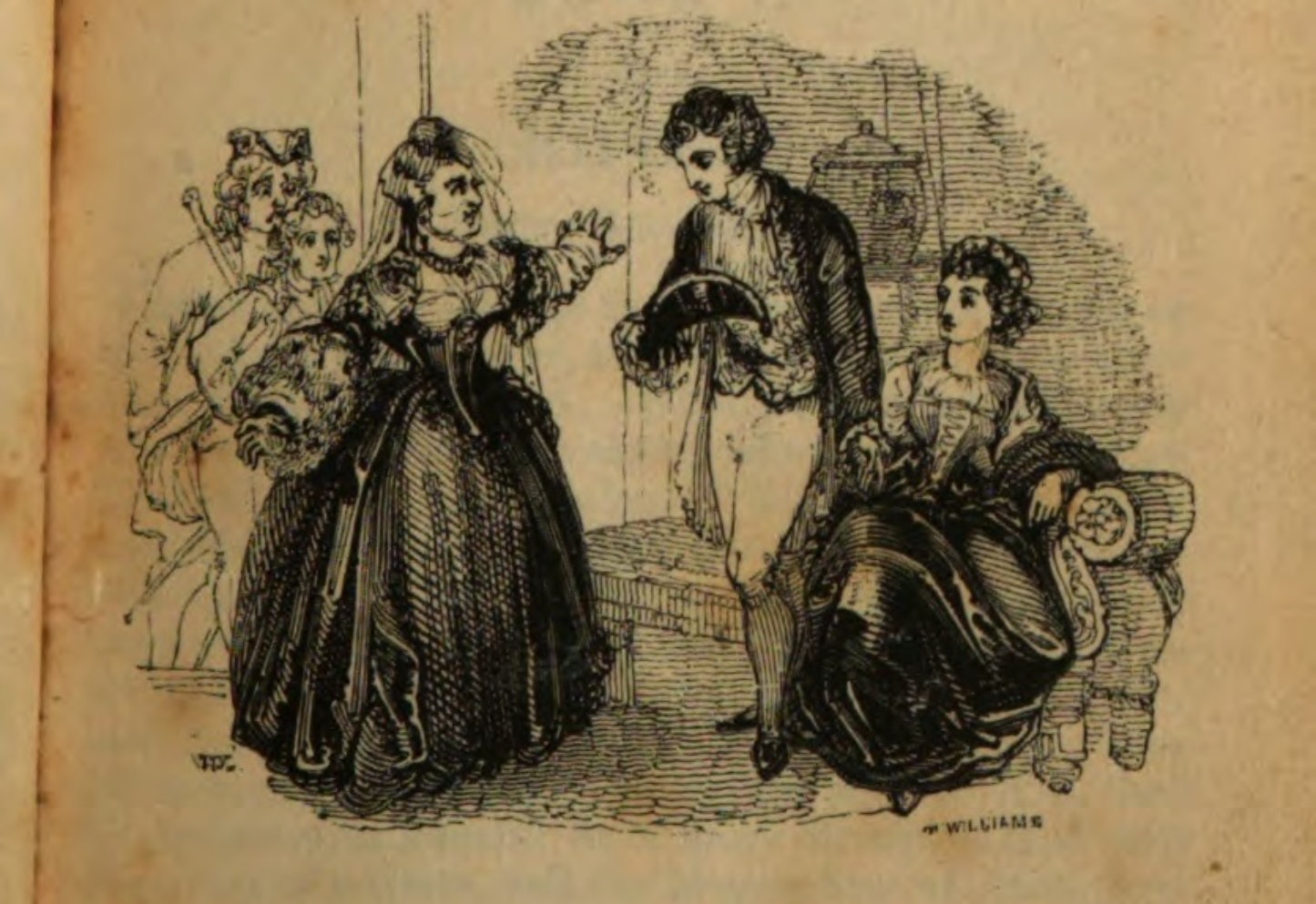
The Placid Man; or, Memoirs of Sir Charles Beville (1828)

Jenner's first volume of poems was published in 1766, and in 1767 and 1768 he gained the Seatonian Prize at Cambridge for poems on sacred subjects, the first being on The Gift of Tongues, the second on The Destruction of Nineveh.

Besides poetry, he published in 1767 a volume of sketches and essays entitled Letters from Altamont to his Friend in the Country, and two volumes of miscellaneous papers, entitled Letters from Lothario to Penelope, in 1771. This last includes two dramas, Lucinda, a dramatic entertainment, and The Man of Family, a sentimental comedy; both also published separately in 1770 and 1771 respectively.

In 1770, Jenner published anonymously his only novel, The Placid Man, or Memoirs of Sir Charles Beville, which attained considerable success, and was republished with his name in 1773. In this, his one piece of sustained fictional narrative, Jenner departed from the epistolary form and followed Henry Fielding in telling his story from the viewpoint of an omniscient narrator who both recounts the events of the story and comments upon related subjects. J. M. S. Tompkins, acknowledging that "Fielding's is certainly the sovereign influence", also notes the influence of Richardson and Sterne:

The education of the hero by his father, the musical baronet, and his uncle, the retired West Indian governor, is after Sterne; the placid man himself, with his benevolence and his sentiments, would have been a welcome guest at Sir Charles Grandison's table.

After The Placid Man, Jenner returned to poetry, and another volume of poems, entitled Town Eclogues, was published in 1772; 2nd edition 1773. He also published separately Louisa, a Tale, to which is added an Elegy to the Memory of Lord Lyttelton, the original manuscript of which came into the possession of his great-nephew, H. L. Jenner, Bishop of Dunedin.
