= Westrill and Starmore =

Civil parish in Leicestershire, England

Coordinates: 52.41645°N 1.13159°W

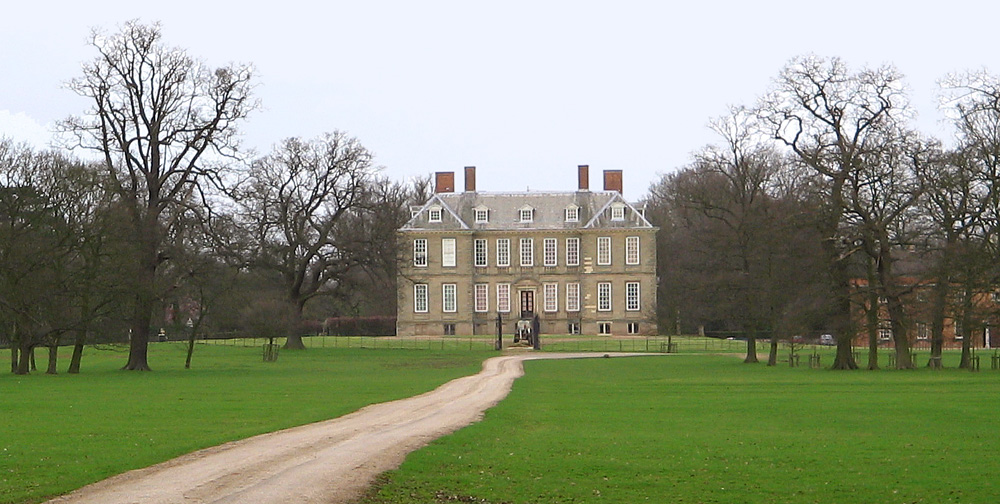
- Stanford Hall

- Location within Leicestershire
- Population: 7 (2001 Census)
- OS grid reference: SP591801
- Civil parish: Westrill and Starmore
- District: Harborough
- Shire county: Leicestershire
- Region: East Midlands
- Country: England
- Sovereign state: United Kingdom
- Post town: LUTTERWORTH
- Postcode district: LE17
- Police: Leicestershire
- Fire: Leicestershire
- Ambulance: East Midlands

Westrill and Starmore is a civil parish in the Harborough district of Leicestershire, England. It has no settlement as such since it is one of the least populated parishes in Harborough District, comprising farmland surrounding the track from Stanford Park to Walcote village in the parish of Misterton with Walcote. The parish is located in the south of the county, on the border with Northamptonshire, between the parishes of Swinford and South Kilworth. The principal building in the parish is Stanford Hall, Leicestershire. To the south-east it faces the Northamptonshire parish of Stanford-on-Avon, across the River Avon.
