= Welham, Leicestershire =

Village in Leicestershire, England

Coordinates: 52.525°N 0.873°W

Welham
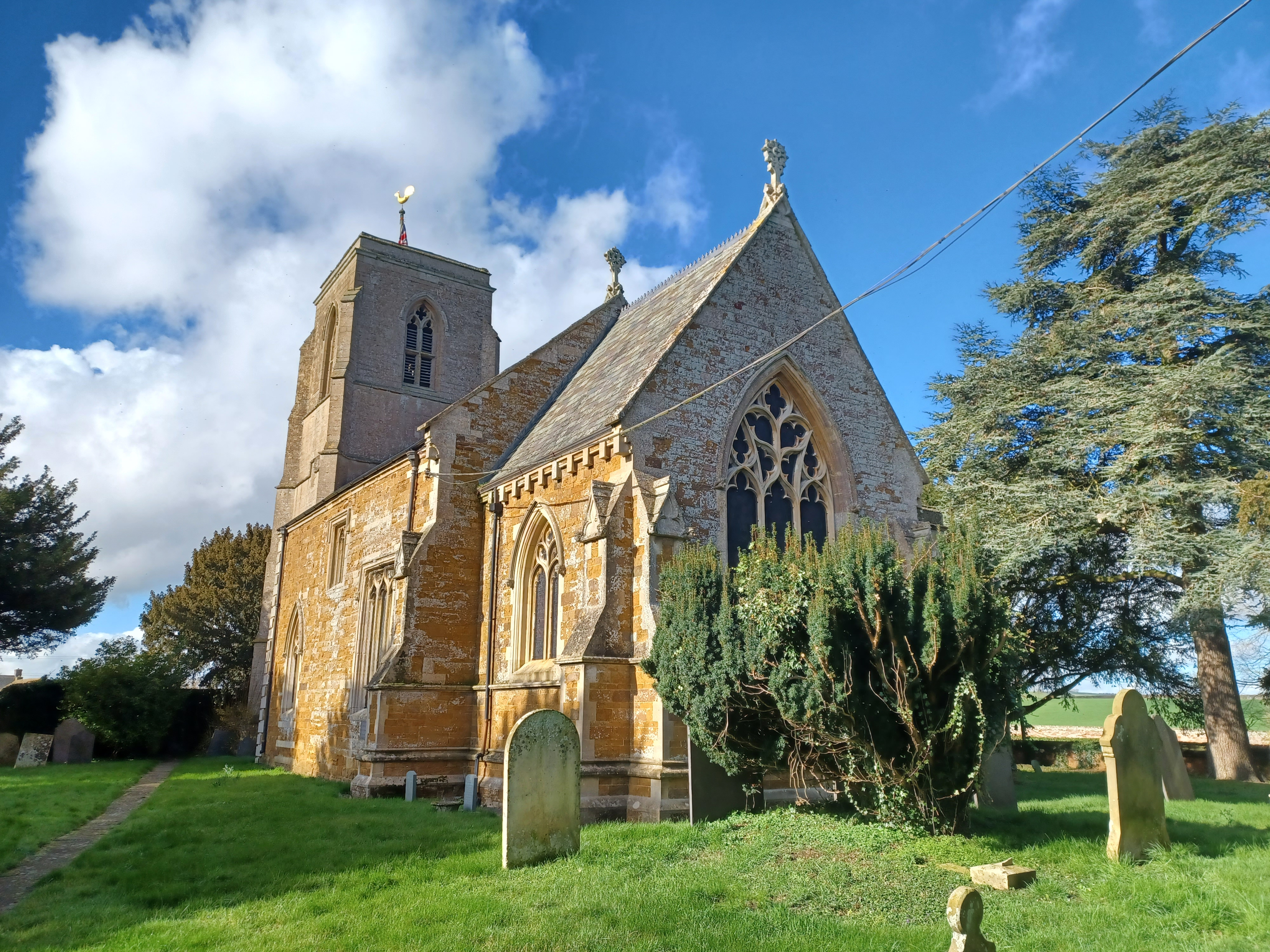
- Church of St Andrew

- Location within Leicestershire
- Population: 40 (2011 Census)
- District: Harborough
- Shire county: Leicestershire
- Region: East Midlands
- Country: England
- Sovereign state: United Kingdom
- Post town: Market Harborough
- Postcode district: LE16
- Dialling code: 01858
- Police: Leicestershire
- Fire: Leicestershire
- Ambulance: East Midlands
- UK Parliament: Rutland and Stamford

Welham is a small village and civil parish in the Harborough district of Leicestershire, England. Welham lies 4 miles (6 km) north-east of Market Harborough. The village is situated on the north bank of the River Welland, which forms the border with the neighbouring county of Northamptonshire. The population is included in the civil parish of Slawston.

== History ==
The village has been here since before the Norman conquest. Earl Ralph of Hereford who died in 1057 had five ploughs here and someone named Archil had two.

Francis Edwards was the Lord of the Manor and he floated the idea of diverting the main London road over the River Welland via the bridge at Welham. He rebuilt the houses on the north side of the road in 1720 and he had an Inn built based on the Red Lion at Northampton. However his cunning plan was not well received. The road was not diverted so Francis decided to live in his partially completed new buildings. Francis was credited with founding Kibworth Grammar School

The local church, Saint Andrew, contains a memorial to its benefactor Francis Edwards. The memorial was paid for by his daughter. He died in 1729. He had married well and when he died he made his daughter Mary Edwards the richest woman in England. She was probably born in London, but her father was "of Welham Grove" and she was said to have been "of Welham" after her (kind of) marriage ended in 1734. She now had a son, Gerard-Anne Edwards, and when she died she was buried simply but beside her father in St Andrews Church in Welham. She had taken great care with her son's education and she transferred all her wealth to him. He married Diana, Baroness Barham and he inherited Exton Park.

== The Bridge ==
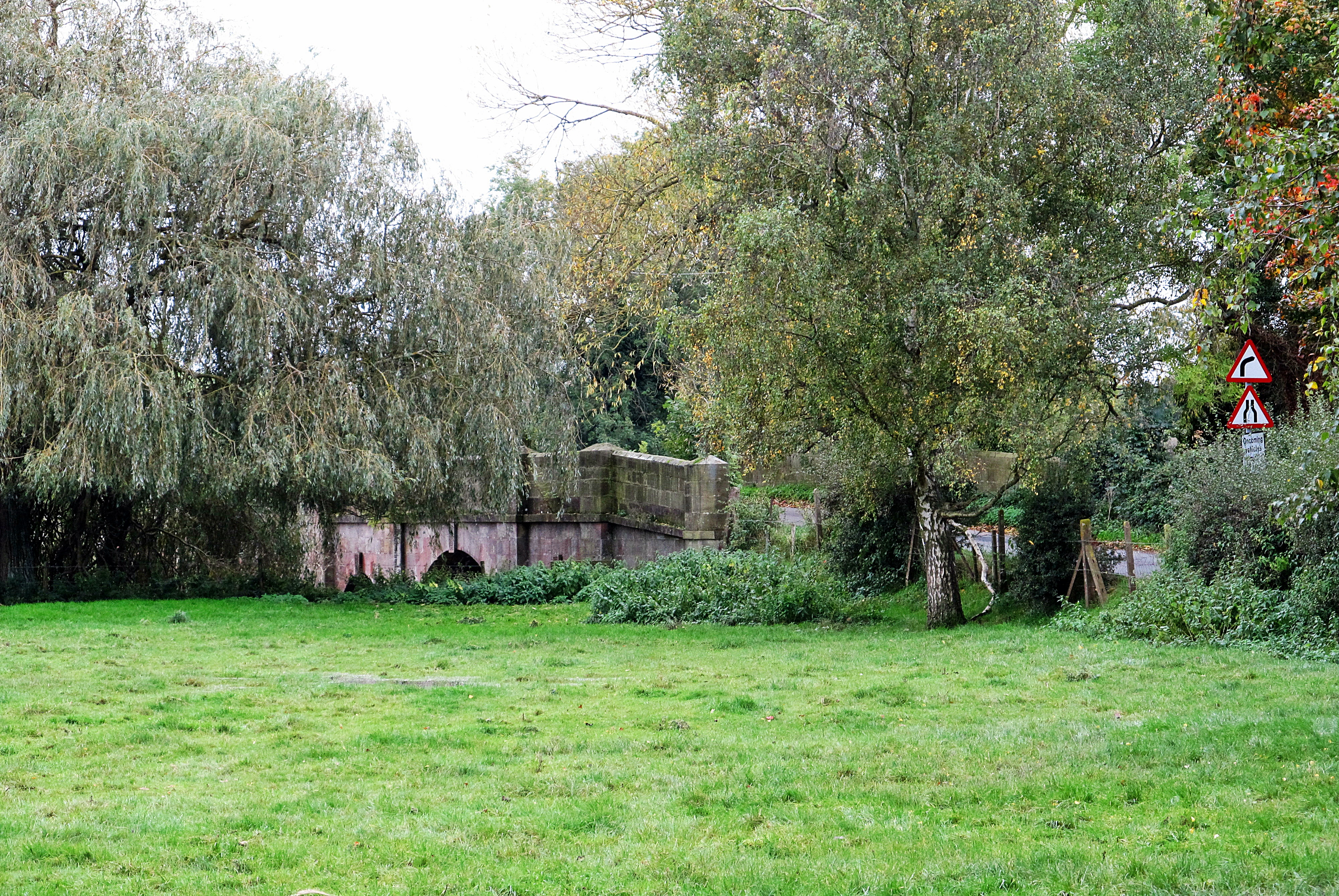
The bridge over the River Welland in 2019

There have been three bridges over the River Welland here. The current (2020) stone bridge has three spans with the river entering the middle span. It was built in 1880 after the second bridge was destroyed by floods.

The current bridge has been a class 2 listed building since 1984. The second bridge was a four span bridge and it was the first built with public money. It was designed by Joseph Vinrace and built of brick in 1810.

The first bridge had been built for private use only by the owners of Old Hall in 1678. The owners would only allow others to use it in times of freezing or flood - when the alternative (a ford) became impassable. The ford, to the west side of the bridge, became unusable in the middle of the 18th century and the public were then allowed to share the bridge at all times.

== Today ==
According to the 2001 census the parish had a population of 40. There is a public house, The Old Red Lion.
