= Vincent Wing =

17th-century English astrologer and astronomer

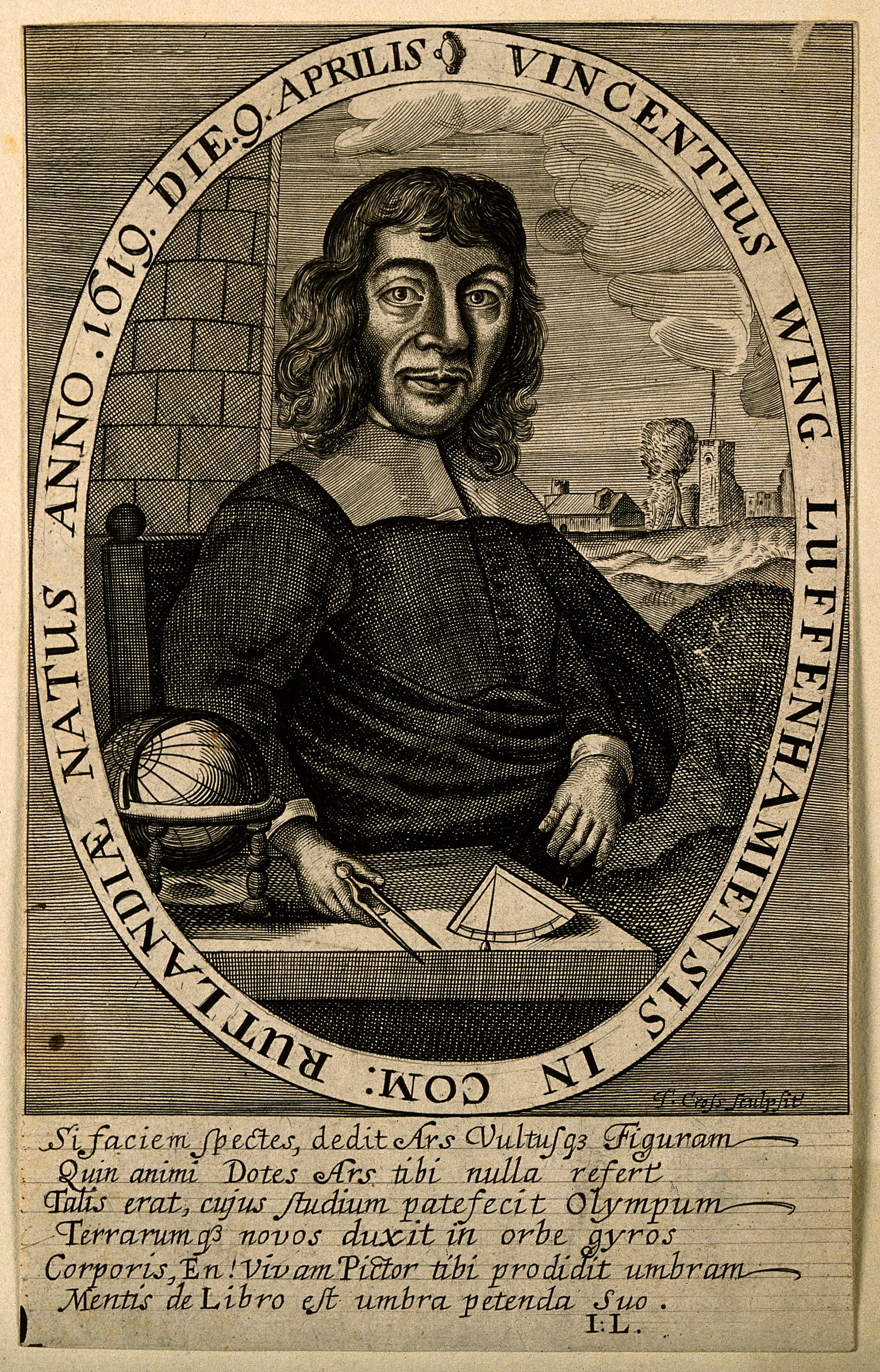
Author portrait of Vincent Wing engraved by T. Cross (frontispiece to the Astronomia Britannica of 1669)

Vincent Wing (1619–1668) was an English astrologer and astronomer, professionally a land surveyor.

== Life and publications ==
Vincent Wing was born at North Luffenham, Rutland on 9 April 1619. The eldest of four sons of Vincent Wing (1587–1660) (who was taking astronomical observations during the 1620s), his family had been established in the village since at least his grandfather's time, but is thought to have had Welsh antecedents. Wing did not receive a university education, but by assiduous study acquired his working knowledge of Latin, Greek, and Mathematics. With these skills he followed his calling as a surveyor, and invented or developed the use of the forty-link two-pole chain for measuring tracts of land in rods or poles, a method which he explained and advocated in his published works. While so engaged, two of his younger brothers, Solomon (1621) and Samuel (1626), married during the earlier 1640s and began their families, but the first of Vincent's children by his wife Alice to be christened at North Luffenham was Elizabeth, in November 1652.

=== Urania Practica: with Leybourn ===
During this time Wing collaborated with William Leybourn (1626–1716), and dated the preface to their jointly authored work Urania Practica, (published in 1649) from North Luffenham in 1648. Containing over 300 pages, this was the first substantial compendium of astronomy written in the English language. It was the commencement of important authorial careers in surveying and astronomy for both men, and they defended themselves against their critic Jeremy Shakerley soon afterwards.

=== Harmonicon Cœleste ===
In the following year Wing published independently A Dreadful Prognostication, containing astrological predictions. However several of Wing's later publications were made through the press of Robert Leybourn, who went into partnership with William Leybourn in 1651. The first of these, Wing's Harmonicon Cœleste, appeared in 1651 at a time when Wing was in correspondence with William Lilly: a surviving copy of the book from the library of Sir Isaac Newton was carefully annotated by its owner. In this work Wing had made a transition towards more modern astronomical conceptions. At the Leybourn press William Leybourn produced his own first enduring and substantial work, The Compleat Surveyor, in 1653: the association with Wing persisted until Wing's death.

=== Astronomia Instaurata: controversy with Street ===
Wing's next major work, his Astronomia Instaurata, appeared in 1656. This led to a controversy with Thomas Streete, who published his Astronomia Carolina in 1661, and followed it with An Appendix to Astronomia Carolina in 1664 in which he criticised Wing for his mistakes. In 1665 Wing responded in his Examen Astronomiae Carolina, exposing the alleged errors of Thomas Street, who retaliated with Examen examinatum of 1667, 'a castigation of the envy and ignorance of Vincent Wing.'

=== Ephemerides: Wing and Flamsteed ===
Wing issued ephemerides for twenty years (1652–1671), which John Flamsteed considered to be the most accurate of their time. As a very young man Flamsteed maintained a correspondence with Wing (who died in 1668). Flamsteed, who interested himself in the opinions of both Wing and Streete, wrote: "with [Mr. Wing] I had a faire Correspondence, and though we differed de parallaxi et Æquationibus systematis Solaris and severall other things, yet our dissent made us not the lesse freinds;" adding, that though he [i.e. Flamsteed] differed with Mr. Streete in his opinions de Fixatione Apheliorum et Nodorum, et de Æquationibus Lunae oscillatorijs, yet he hoped that Streete should prove to be a friendly correspondent also.

=== Astrology: Wing and Atwell ===
A convinced astrologer, Wing edited in 1660 the Defence of the Divine Art of Natural Astrologie which had been sent to him by his late friend George Atwell (c.1576–1658), Surveyor, and 'Professor of the Mathematicks' at the University of Cambridge, to which he wrote an informative preface. Wing remarks, "The stars incline the will (saith Scotus) yet in no wise necessitate it, notwithstanding it often hapneth that Astrologers fore-tel truths concerning the manners of men, by reason of their proneness to follow their sensitive appetite." Atwell was the author of a work on Surveying explaining the accurate use of the measuring chain, which by 1665 had run into a third, enlarged (London) edition.

=== Geodætes Practicus ===
In 1664 Wing produced his own treatise on practical land surveying, his Geodætes Practicus : or, The Art of Surveying. A second edition, containing also a reprint of the Examen Astronomiae Carolinae, was produced in 1666, almost the entire run of which was destroyed in the Great Fire of London. The Third Edition was the much enlarged version issued as Geodætes Practicus Redivivus by his nephew John Wing in 1699–1700.

=== Astronomia Britannica ===
The culmination of Wing's labours took shape in his Astronomia Britannica, published posthumously in 1669. Written entirely in Latin, well-illustrated with diagrams and enriched throughout by classical literary allusions, this was a complete system of astronomy on Copernican principles. It followed Seth Ward in formulating Kepler's second law. It was prefaced by a line-engraved portrait of the author seated at a table with globe and instruments, and a view of a village (possibly meant for North Luffenham) beyond. The work opened with a letter of dedication to Sir Robert Markham (1644–1690), M.P. for Grantham, who wrote a two-page postscript de Refractione to the text. The seven-page preface, Praefatium ad Candidum Lectorem, which opens with a flourish invoking the authority of Hermes Trismegistus, is dated from North Luffenham early in 1665. The five 'books' of the main text (pp. 1–246) each have their own title-pages, the first three dated 1668 and the last two 1669. The latter half of the work (pp. 1–366) is occupied by the Tables with a further dated title-page of 1668 for the Synopsis Compendiaria of Astronomic Observations (part 2 p. 265).

=== Olympia Domata ===
Wing also wrote for the Stationers' Company an almanac styled Olympia Domata, the annual sale of which averaged 50,000 copies. The Olympia Domata for 1670 was edited by his elder son, Vincent Wing, and the numbers for 1704 to 1727 by his nephew, John Wing of Pickworth, Rutland (see below). The publication was continued by his descendants at irregular intervals until 1805.

=== Personalia ===
Vincent Wing resided with his wife Alice at North Luffenham, where daughters Mary (1654), Alice (1658), Elizabeth (1664) and Catherine (1666) and sons Vincent (1656) and James (1661), were christened. He occasionally went to London for learned company. His friend and biographer John Gadbury commended his wit. He drew the scheme of his own nativity published in Gadbury's Brief Relation, and is said to have made a correct forecast of his death. He contracted consumption, of which he died on 20 September 1668, aged 49, having made his will only a fortnight previously. Gadbury observed that dedication to work had exhausted him, and rebutted any suggestion that Wing might have taken his own life. He was buried at North Luffenham. The Latin verses accompanying his portrait in the Astronomia Britannica form an epigram which may be translated:

"To regard his likeness, Art shows his form and face,
But the spirit's dower Art will no-wise declare.
For He was such whose study laid open Olympus,
And traced new circuits through the sphere of the world.
See, the artist has drawn the vital bodily shade:
Search in his book for the lineaments of his mind."

== The Wing family ==
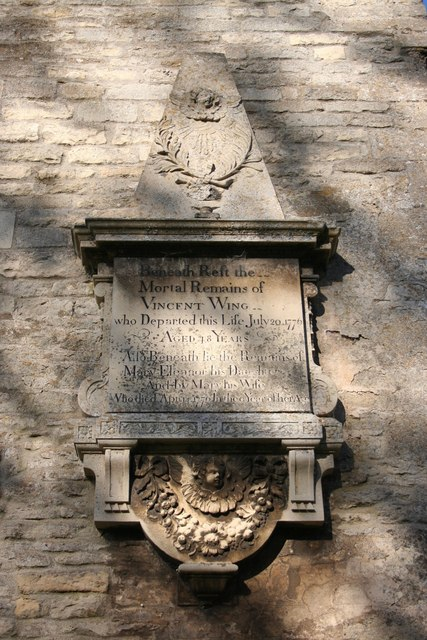
Memorial to Vincent Wing (1727–1776) at Great Casterton church

After Vincent Wing's death, and during the 18th century, the vicinity of North Luffenham maintained distinction by its association with the Barker family of Lyndon Hall and South Luffenham in Rutland. Vincent Wing the elder (father of the astronomer) had, before 1635, been a tenant of lands in North Luffenham which had formerly belonged to Fineshade Priory, Northamptonshire, and had become property of the rector of North Luffenham, Robert Johnson (1540–1625). In 1630 Johnson's grandson Isaac, principal shareholder in the Massachusetts Bay Company, sailed with John Winthrop in the founding voyage to Massachusetts. In that company was also one John Wing and his wife Deborah Batchelder, from whom an American family of Wing hopes to trace its descent: the possible association of that John with Vincent Wing's family is mooted in a published genealogy.

In 1635 Johnson's lands were sold to Samuel Barker of South Luffenham, who died in 1658, but the continuing relations with the Wing family are shown by deeds of recovery relating to some 180 acres at North Luffenham and Ketton, between Vincent Winge junior, gent. (presumably the astronomer himself), and Jonathan and John Barker, gents. (two of the sons and heirs of Samuel Barker, upon whom the former Johnson lands had devolved), in 1660. These heirs of Samuel Barker's lived at North Luffenham Manor House (built 1640). The Wings therefore had dealings with the Barker family more than with Noel or Digby, the other two principal manorial families of North Luffenham. Lyndon Hall became the home of Samuel Barker (1686–1759) and his wife Sarah, daughter of Sir Isaac Newton's pupil and successor as Lucasian Professor, William Whiston (1667–1752), who latterly resided with them, and of Samuel's son Thomas Barker (1722–1809), called 'The Father of Meteorology', who married the sister of Gilbert White of Selborne.

The example and brilliance of Vincent Wing found its reflex in descendants of William and Elizabeth Wing, and of Vincent's youngest brother Moses Wing (baptised 4.x.1629, buried 5.xii.1697) and his wife Priscilla, at least eleven of whose children were baptised at North Luffenham between 1655 and 1675. There were two family successions whose works in Surveying, Fenland Engineering, Mathematics, Instrument-Making, Architecture and Astronomy continued through the eighteenth and nineteenth centuries, as is expressed below.

=== Line of John Wing of Pickworth (1662) ===
- John Wing of Pickworth (1662-1726), and wife Sarah Hyfield, was the father of Tycho Wing I (1696–1750), philosopher and astronomer, and their various namesake descendants. John Wing of Pickworth was a County coroner, surveyor and almanackist who published in 1693 the Heptarchia Mathematica, a text-book for masons, carpenters and glaziers: in 1699 he published an enlarged version of his uncle's Art of Surveying, the Geodætes Practicus Redivivus supplemented by Scientia Stellarum, Calculation of the Planets' Places, etc. John was survived by five children,
  - John Wing (died 1741), Citizen and Haberdasher of London
  - daughters Sarah (Baily), Priscilla (Sisson) and Elizabeth (Clerk), and
  - Tycho Wing I (1696–1750), Philosopher and astronomer, teacher of Mathematics to boarding pupils at Pickworth, and Coroner for Rutland 1727–42, to whom his father bequeathed all his Mathematical books and instruments. He was the subject of an oil portrait (showing him with an astrological globe) by John Vanderbank for Stationers' Hall, London, rendered as a mezzotint by George White (1684–1732). He married Eleanor Peach of Stoke Dry, Rutland, and had at least four children, including
    - Tycho Wing II (1726–1774), instrument maker of Montpelier Row, Twickenham. He was apprenticed to the London instrument-maker Thomas Heath in 1741 and was in partnership with him from 1751 to 1773. He married Heath's daughter Hypatia. Published and sold all manner of materials for surveyors.
    - Vincent Wing (1727–1776), surveyor, who married Mary and was father of
      - Tycho Wing III, baptised at Great Casterton in 1769.
    - John Wing (1723–1780). Became Steward to the 4th Duke and 5th Duke of Bedford at Thorney, Cambridgeshire. He published maps of the Bedford Level and Lincolnshire Fens and was involved in drainage works on the North Levels during the 1760s. Married Ann Sisson and was father of
      - John Wing junr (1752–1812), who succeeded his father as Steward to the Duke of Bedford at Thorney. He debated and advocated the raising of temporary taxes for the repair and improvement of Fen drainage and maintained the Thorney estate in an exemplary fashion. He married twice, first to Katherine Elger, and second to Jane Ansell, his six children by whom included
        - John Wing, the Revd., of Thornhaugh (1786–1858), who succeeded his father as Steward to the Duke of Bedford at Thorney between 1812 and 1817, and
        - Tycho Wing IV (1794–1851), who, succeeding in 1817, won himself high praise both as manager of the tenantry and for his work in drainage and management of the Fens. Between 1827 and 1834 he undertook a project to improve the outfall of the River Nene, the lower section of which is named 'Tycho Wing's Channel'. He became known as 'King of the Fens'; he married Adelaide Basevi, sister of the architect George Basevi, and had eight children.

=== Line of Aaron Wing of North Luffenham (1666) ===
- Aaron Wing of North Luffenham (baptised 30.ix.1666, the son of Moses and Priscilla Wing), (brother of John Wing of Pickworth), by wife Elizabeth, was the father of six children including
  - John Wing the elder (1697/98-1753), mason, and architect of the tower of St Peter's church at Gaulby, Leicestershire, who by his first wife Elizabeth Townsend was father of
    - John Wing the younger (1728–1794), mason, and architect of the neo-Gothic church of St John the Baptist, c.1761, at King's Norton, Leicestershire; and he, by his wife Elizabeth Gibbins of Hallaton, Leicestershire (where Wing became resident), was father of six children including
      - John Wing (1756–1826), mason and architect: who, being set up in business at Woburn by his father following their 1780–82 collaboration on the Girtford bridge at Sandy, Bedfordshire, became architect of the Town Bridge at Bedford (also of the Town Gaol, the House of Industry and the Bedford Infirmary) and thrice Mayor of that County Town. Among his ten children by wife Elizabeth Tacy were
        - James Tacy Wing (1805–1880), church architect of Bedford.
        - John Wing of Bedford (1802–1861), architect of Biggleswade Town Hall (1844).

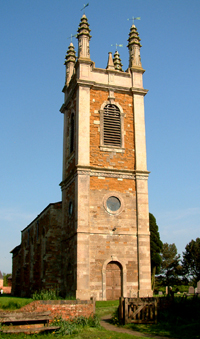
Gaulby church tower.
John Wing the elder (1697–1753)

King's Norton church (c.1760).
John Wing the younger (1728–1794)

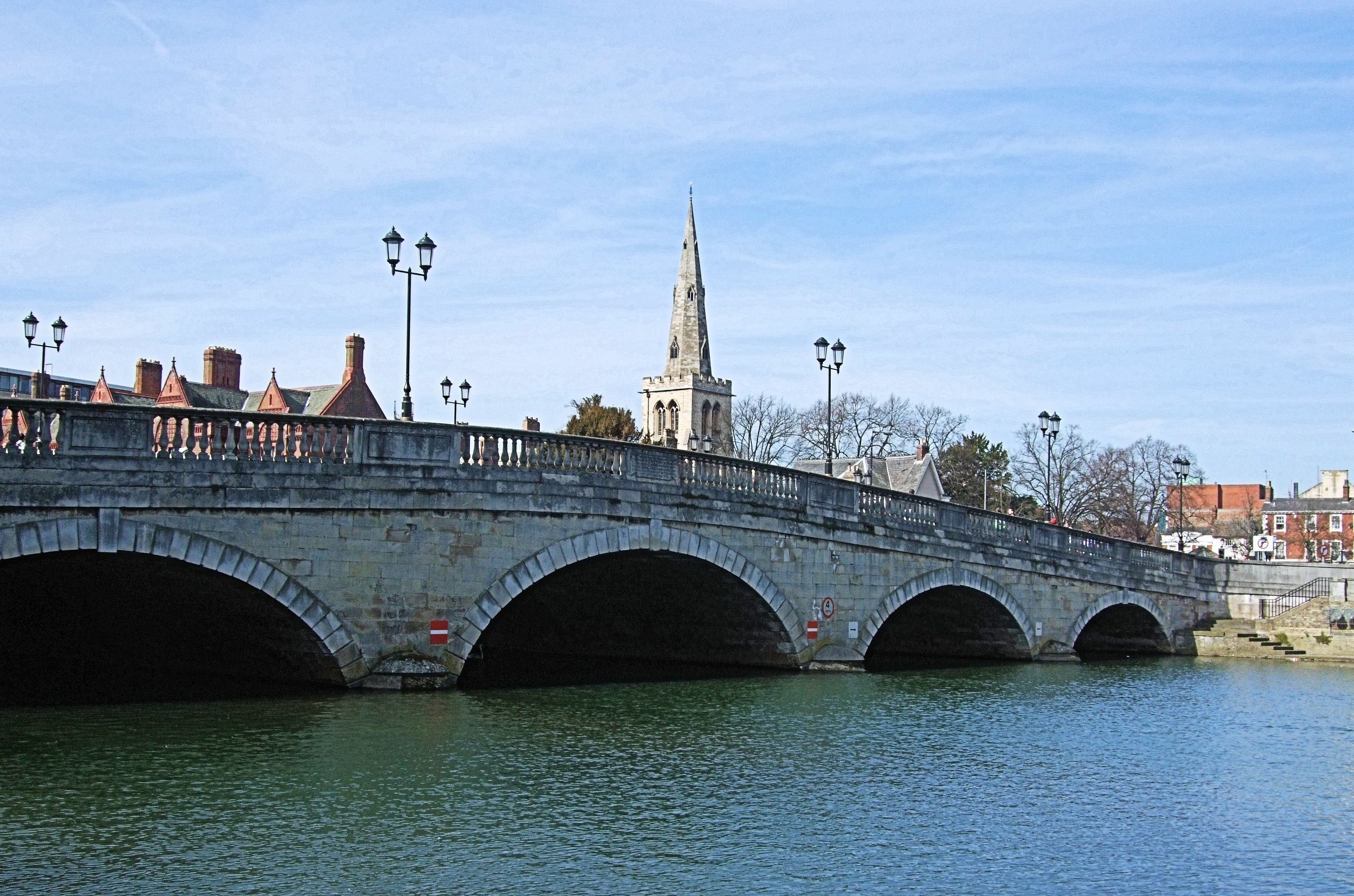
Bedford Bridge on the River Great Ouse (1813).
John Wing (1756–1826)

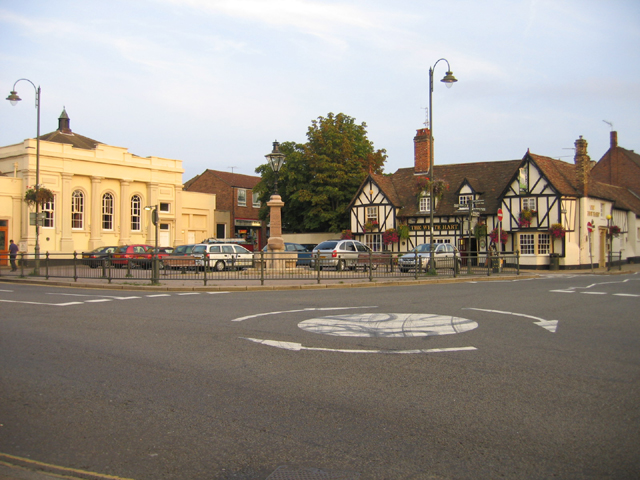
Biggleswade old Town Hall (1844) (left).
John Wing (1802–1861)
