= Walcote, Leicestershire =

Village in Leicestershire, England

Coordinates: 52.448°N 1.166°W

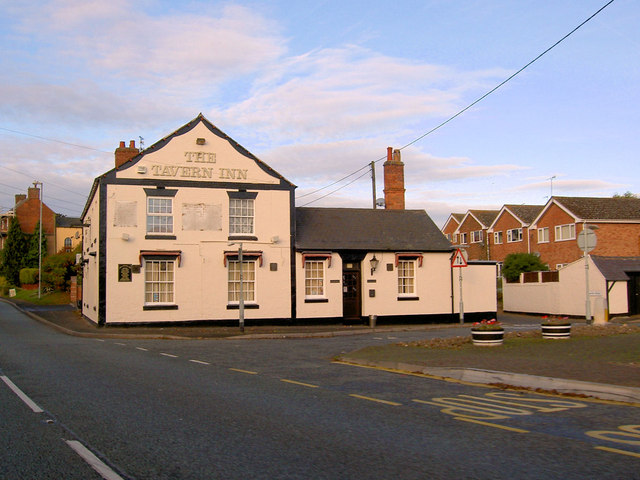
The Tavern Inn at Walcote, October 2007

Walcote is a village in the English county of Leicestershire.

It is on the A4304 road some two miles east of the town of Lutterworth and a mile east of Junction 20 of the M1 motorway. It is the major settlement of the civil parish of Misterton with Walcote and forms part of Harborough district.
