= Marefield =

Hamlet in Leicestershire, England

Coordinates: 52.66494°N 0.89983°W

- Location within Leicestershire
- OS grid reference: SK746079
- District: Harborough
- Shire county: Leicestershire
- Region: East Midlands
- Country: England
- Sovereign state: United Kingdom
- Post town: Leicester
- Postcode district: LE7
- Police: Leicestershire
- Fire: Leicestershire
- Ambulance: East Midlands

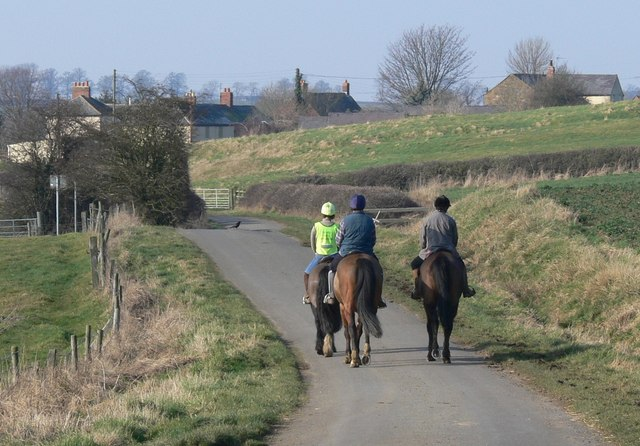
Riders on horseback approaching Marefield, Leicestershire

Marefield is a hamlet and civil parish in the Harborough district of Leicestershire, England. According to the 2001 census it had a population of 20. At the census 2011 the population remained less than 100 and is included in the civil parish of Owston and Newbold. It was also the birthplace of Wire drummer Robert Gotobed, and Thomas Hooker, one of the main founders of Connecticut, USA.
