= King's Norton, Leicestershire =

Village and civil parish in Leicestershire, England

Coordinates: 52.598°N 0.985°W

King's Norton
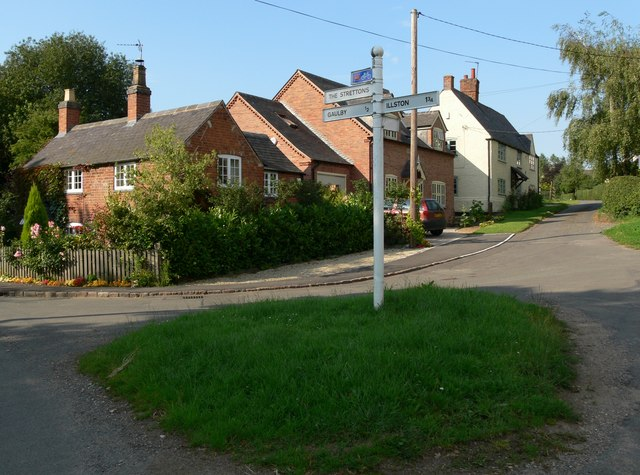
- King's Norton direction post

- Location within Leicestershire
- Population: 62 (2021 census)
- Civil parish: King's Norton
- District: Harborough
- Shire county: Leicestershire
- Region: East Midlands
- Country: England
- Sovereign state: United Kingdom
- Police: Leicestershire
- Fire: Leicestershire
- Ambulance: East Midlands

King's Norton is a village and civil parish in the Harborough district of Leicestershire, England. It is situated to the east of Leicester, and about 2 1/2 miles (4 km) south-west from Billesdon. According to the 2001 census the parish had a population of 69. At the 2021 census the population was 62.

There is a small cluster of houses around the junction of three roads which lead to Gaulby, Little Stretton, and Illston on the Hill; this includes the manor-house, Vicarage, and church. In 1563 there were 12 households, in 1670 there were 17 households. The maximum known population was just over 60 in the 19th century.

== Manor house and other houses ==
The L-shaped manor house is adjacent to the east end of the church. Most of the two storey (plus attics) main structure was probably built by William Whalley (d.1635) or his son Ralph. Sash windows were inserted into the main wing (red brick on an ironstone plinth) in the early 18th century. There is a mid-17th century staircase which has been altered. The old kitchen was in the smaller wing; the kitchen is now in a previous brew-house c.1800. The roof of this wing has an arch-braced collar-beam truss.

Also on this plot is a square brick dovecote with a small diaper pattern (poss. later 17th century). There is a tablet dated 1726 with the initials of Bernard and Anne Whalley on another building.

Other notable buildings are The Limes, Wyggeston Farm (c1700 plus older fragments), a timber-framed cottage, Lime Cottage (18th century brick), The Grange (1870, formerly The Laurels), the village hall (1921 from Co-operative Society).

== Church ==
The Gothic Revival church of St. John the Baptist was built at the cost of just over £20,000 in a little over one year at the commission of Squire William Fortrey. It was designed by local architect John Wing the Younger (1728–94) of North Luffenham. The spire was added in 1775 but destroyed in a storm in 1850.

The interior has hardly changed: the central three-decker pulpit, box pews and west gallery remain, lit by clear windows. Outside at its east end is a monument to William Fortrey, and close by is the 17th-century Fortrey manor house.

Kings Norton Church (Exterior)

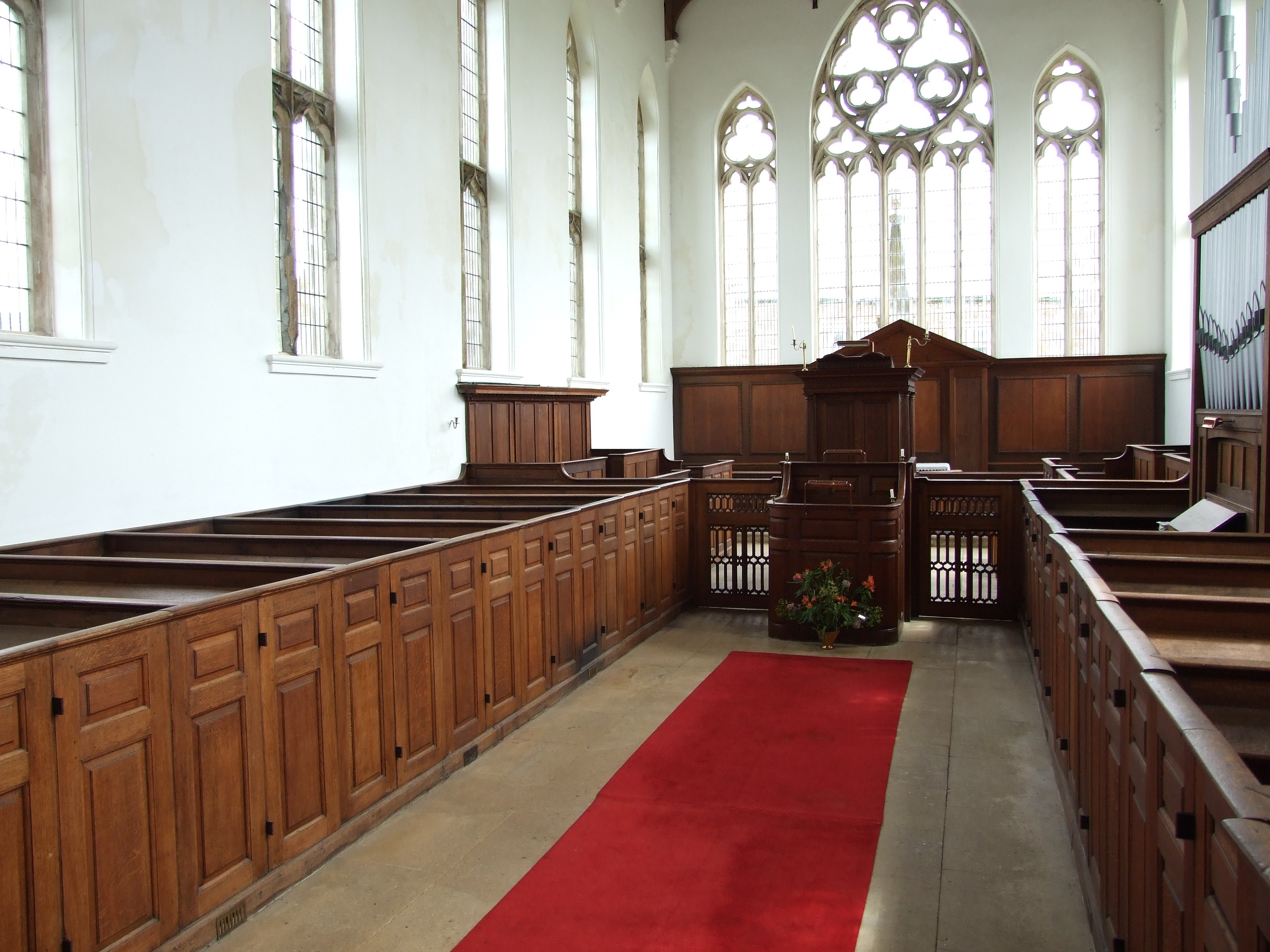
Kings Norton Church (Interior)
