= George White (artist) =

English engraver (c.1684–1732)

- Born: 1684
- Died: 27 May 1732 (aged 47–48); Bloomsbury, London
- Known for: mezzotint engravings

George White (c. 1684–1732) was an English mezzotint engraver.

== Life ==
The son of Robert White, he was born about 1684, and instructed by his father until his death in 1703. He completed some of the plates left unfinished by the latter, and himself executed a few in the line manner; but beginning from 1712 he turned to mezzotints. A portrait of Jean-Baptiste Monnoyer, which he executed in this style from a painting by Godfrey Kneller, was much admired and brought him work. He died at his house in Bloomsbury on 27 May 1732.

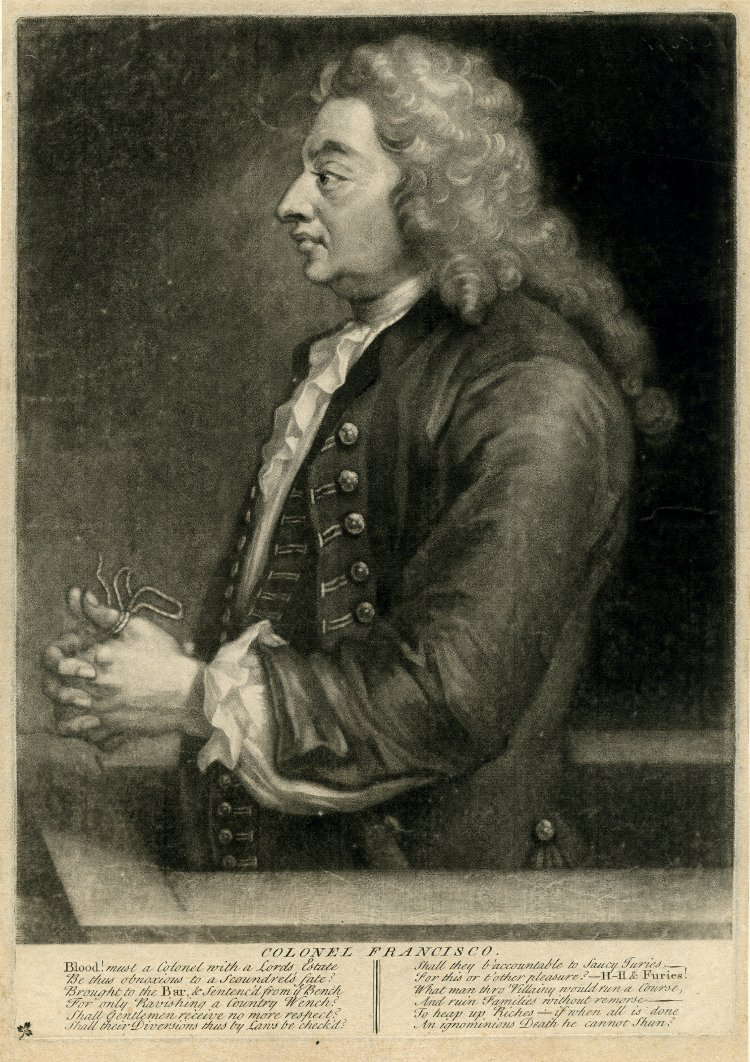
Mezzotint of Francis Charteris, around 1730–1732.

== Works ==
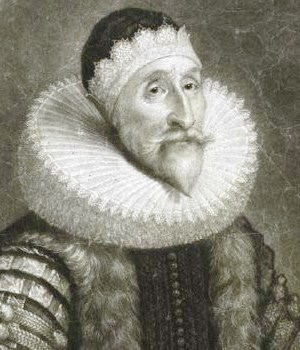
1724 mezzotint of Sir John Coke, after unknown artist.

A leading English mezzotint engraver, he was the first to make use of etched lines to strengthen the work. White's plates number about sixty, the most of them he published himself, and include portraits of William Dobson, bishop George Hooper, Tycho Wing, and Old Parr. White, like his father, drew portraits in pencil on vellum; he also practised in crayons, and latterly took to painting in oils. His plate of the Laughing Boy after Frans Hals was published after his death, with laudatory verses.

== Selected works ==
National Portrait Gallery

- Probably William Somerville, pencil on vellum, 1709
- Isaac Watts, mezzotint, 1727
- William Dobson, mezzotint, (c. 1642–1646)
- John Dryden, mezzotint, (1698)
- Thomas Parr, mezzotint, early 18th century
- Erasmus Smith, mezzotint, early 18th century
- Thomas Blood, mezzotint, early 18th century
- James Gardiner, line engraving, early 18th century
- Thomas Reynolds, mezzotint, early 18th century

National Gallery of Victoria, Melbourne

- Rev. Mr John Nesbitt
- Nicolas Sanderson
