= Shawell =

Village in Leicestershire, England

Coordinates: 52.41799°N 1.20008°W

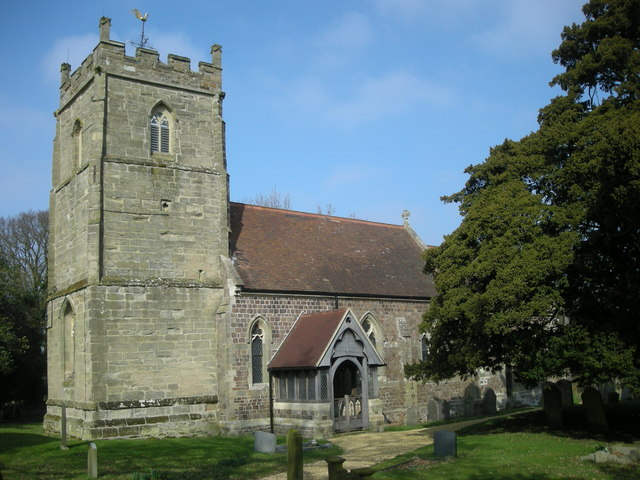
All Saints Church, Shawell

Shawell is a small village in the Harborough district of Leicestershire, England. Its population at the 2001 United Kingdom census was 126, increasing to 162 at the 2011 census.

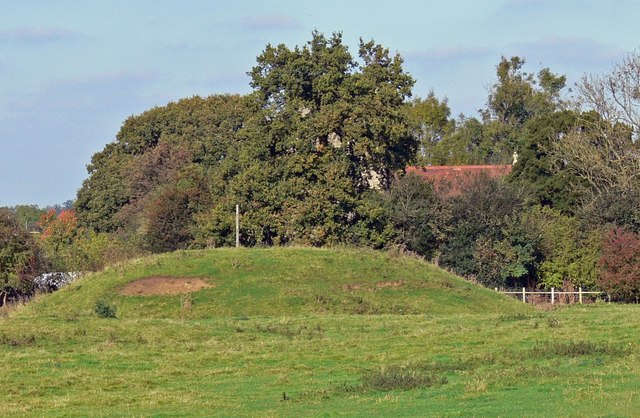
Shawell Castle

It lies less than a mile from the M1 and M6 motorways. The site of the Roman town of Tripontium is on the A5 (Watling Street), west of the village.

Near to the church are the earthwork remains of a motte and bailey castle.

The Great Central main railway line, the last main line to be built from the north of England to London, was opened on 15 March 1899 and ran just to the west of Shawell, mainly in a deep cutting where an important signal box was also sited. Although there was never a station at Shawell, one was proposed a little way to the south-west where the line crossed over the A5 and would have been named "Watling Street". The station, which would have lain roughly at the midpoint between Rugby and Lutterworth, was never built however, and the line closed on 5 May 1969, the cutting now being partly filled in.
