= Laughton, Leicestershire =

Village in Leicestershire, England

Coordinates: 52°29′45″N 1°01′38″W

Laughton
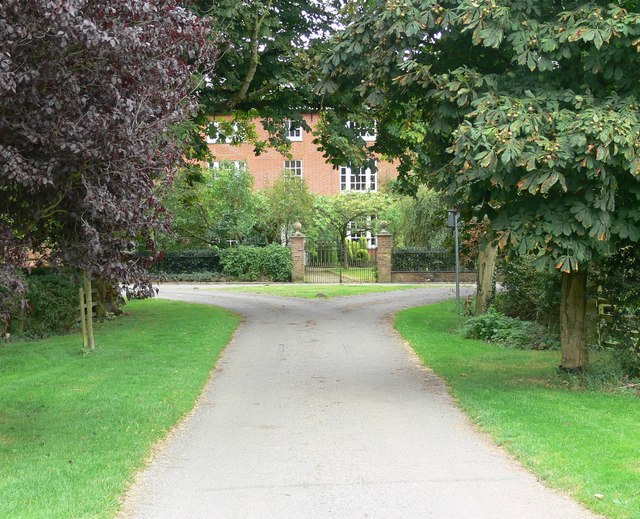
- Approaching Laughton village

- Location within Leicestershire
- OS grid reference: SP660891
- Civil parish: Laughton
- District: Harborough
- Shire county: Leicestershire
- Region: East Midlands
- Country: England
- Sovereign state: United Kingdom
- Post town: Lutterworth
- Postcode district: LE17
- Police: Leicestershire
- Fire: Leicestershire
- Ambulance: East Midlands
- UK Parliament: Harborough, Oadby and Wigston

Laughton is a small village and parish situated in Leicestershire, approximately 5 miles west of Market Harborough. Old buildings dominate Laughton with currently only two modern buildings situated in the village. There is a row of cottages opposite the church that has parts dating back to medieval times. The church itself dates back to the 13th century and had a major renovation in 1879. The population is included in the civil parish of Gumley.
