= Cold Newton =

Hamlet and civil parish in England

Coordinates: 52.65277°N 0.93969°W

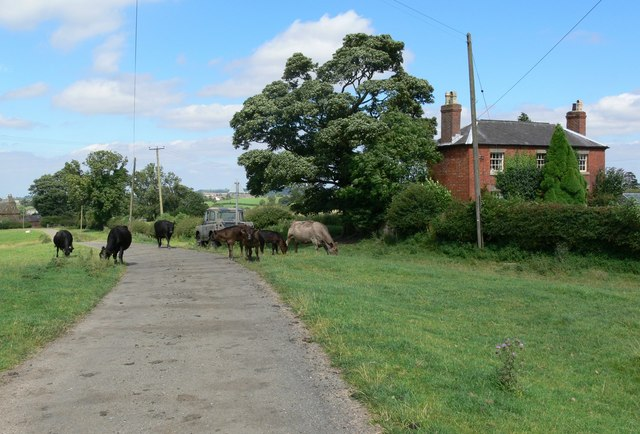

- Location within Leicestershire
- OS grid reference: SK715063
- District: Harborough
- Shire county: Leicestershire
- Region: East Midlands
- Country: England
- Sovereign state: United Kingdom
- Post town: LEICESTER
- Postcode district: LE7
- Dialling code: 0116
- Police: Leicestershire
- Fire: Leicestershire
- Ambulance: East Midlands
- UK Parliament: Rutland and Stamford

Cold Newton is a small hamlet and civil parish in the Harborough district of Leicestershire, England. It is situated about two miles from Tilton on the Hill and two miles north of Billesdon. Some 700 feet (210 m) above sea level, it overlooks the Wreake valley. Any population remaining is listed in the civil parish of Lowesby.

== History ==
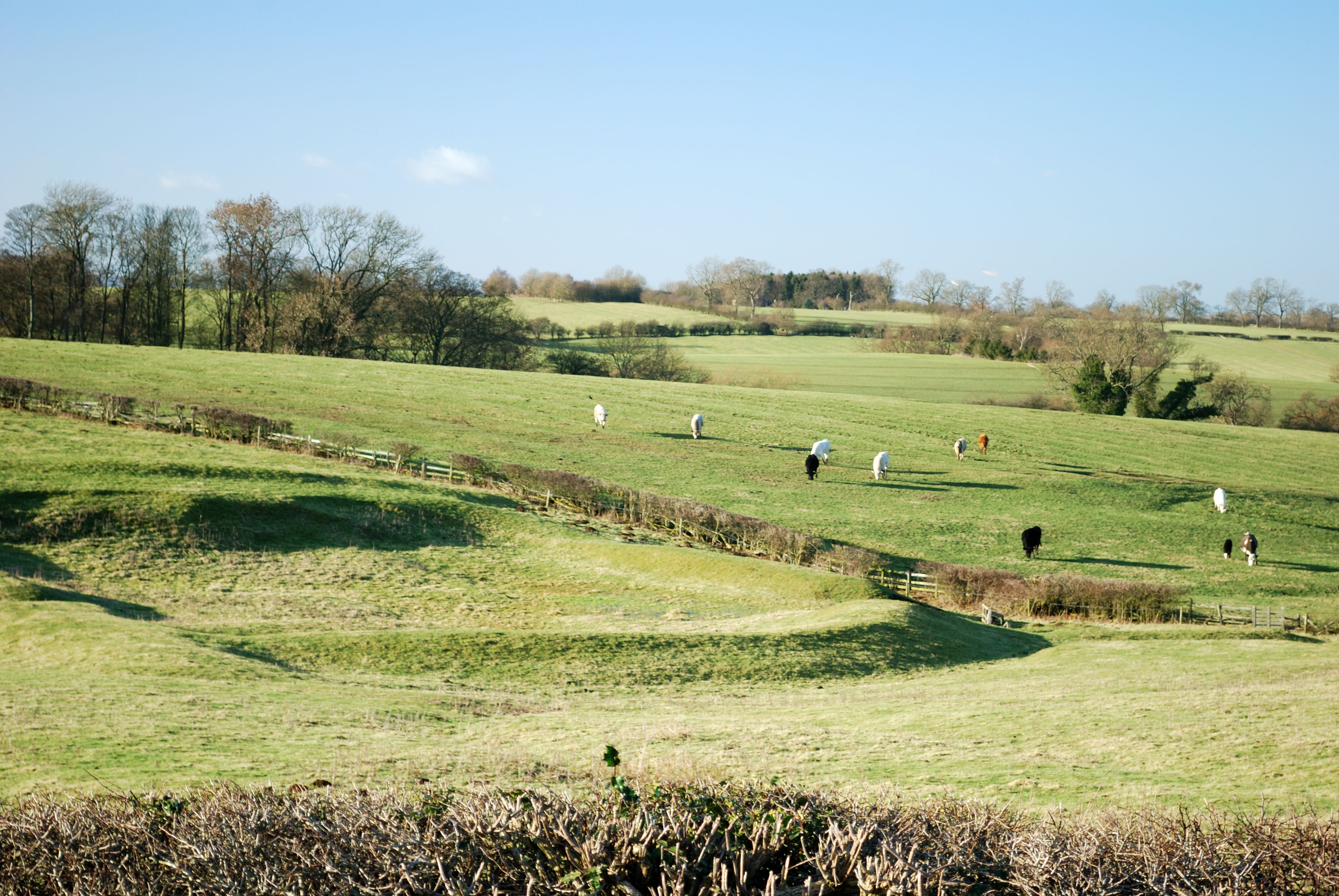
Cold Newton DMV remains

The second part of the hamlet's name means 'farm/settlement which is new'. 'Cold' was later added due to the cold winds from the hamlet's exposed position.

Newton, spelt Niwetone is recorded in the Domesday Book of 1086. Here it is listed as largely 'deserted' but still containing 11 households. The name later changed to Newton Burdett when Hugo de Burdet became Lord of the manor and was also known as Newton Marmion when the Marmion family were seated there.

Towards the end of the 16th century, farmland surrounding the village began to be enclosed for pasture. This process had been completed by 1641. This enclosure likely resulted in the construction of farmhouses away from the village and the abandonment of the village itself.

== Present day ==
Medieval Cold Newton is now deserted. Ridges and hollows in fields mark where the village stood (at grid reference SK715066) and the site is a scheduled monument. For administrative purposes the village is linked with Lowesby parish. It has no church, public house or shop. A village green was created in 1977 to mark Queen Elizabeth II's Silver Jubilee on land gifted to the parish by the Quenby estate, which neighbours the hamlet.
