= Burton Overy =

Village in Leicestershire, England

Coordinates: 52°34′N 1°00′W

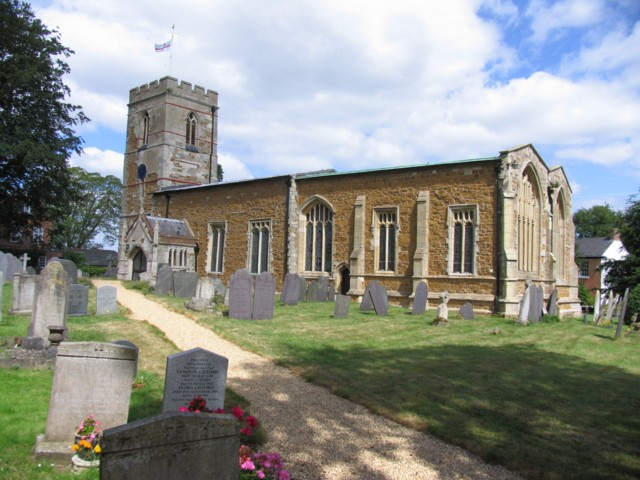
- St Andrew's Church

- Location within Leicestershire
- Population: 440 (2011 Census)
- District: Harborough
- Shire county: Leicestershire
- Region: East Midlands
- Country: England
- Sovereign state: United Kingdom
- Post town: LEICESTER
- Postcode district: LE8
- Dialling code: 0116
- Police: Leicestershire
- Fire: Leicestershire
- Ambulance: East Midlands
- UK Parliament: Harborough, Oadby and Wigston

Burton Overy is a village and civil parish in the Harborough district of Leicestershire, about nine miles south-east of Leicester city centre, and not far from Great Glen. According to the 2001 census, the parish had a population of 289., increasing at the 2011 census to 440 (including Little Stretton).

In the year 2000, within the civil Parish, it has a population of 293 living in 129 households, eight working farms, a pub (The Bell), a new village hall and a thriving church community based in St. Andrew's Church.

== History ==
The village's name means 'farm/settlement with a fortification'. In 1261, Robert de Noveray held the village.

A brief history of the village, undertaken to mark the new Millennium, spans many different aspects of life in this small Leicestershire village over the past 1000 years, and records some of the changes which have taken place.

One of the earliest mentions of this place is in the Domesday Book, where it is listed amongst the lands given to Hugh de Grandmesnil by the King.
