= Harborough District =

Coordinates: 52.4785°N 0.9206°W

- Non-metropolitan district
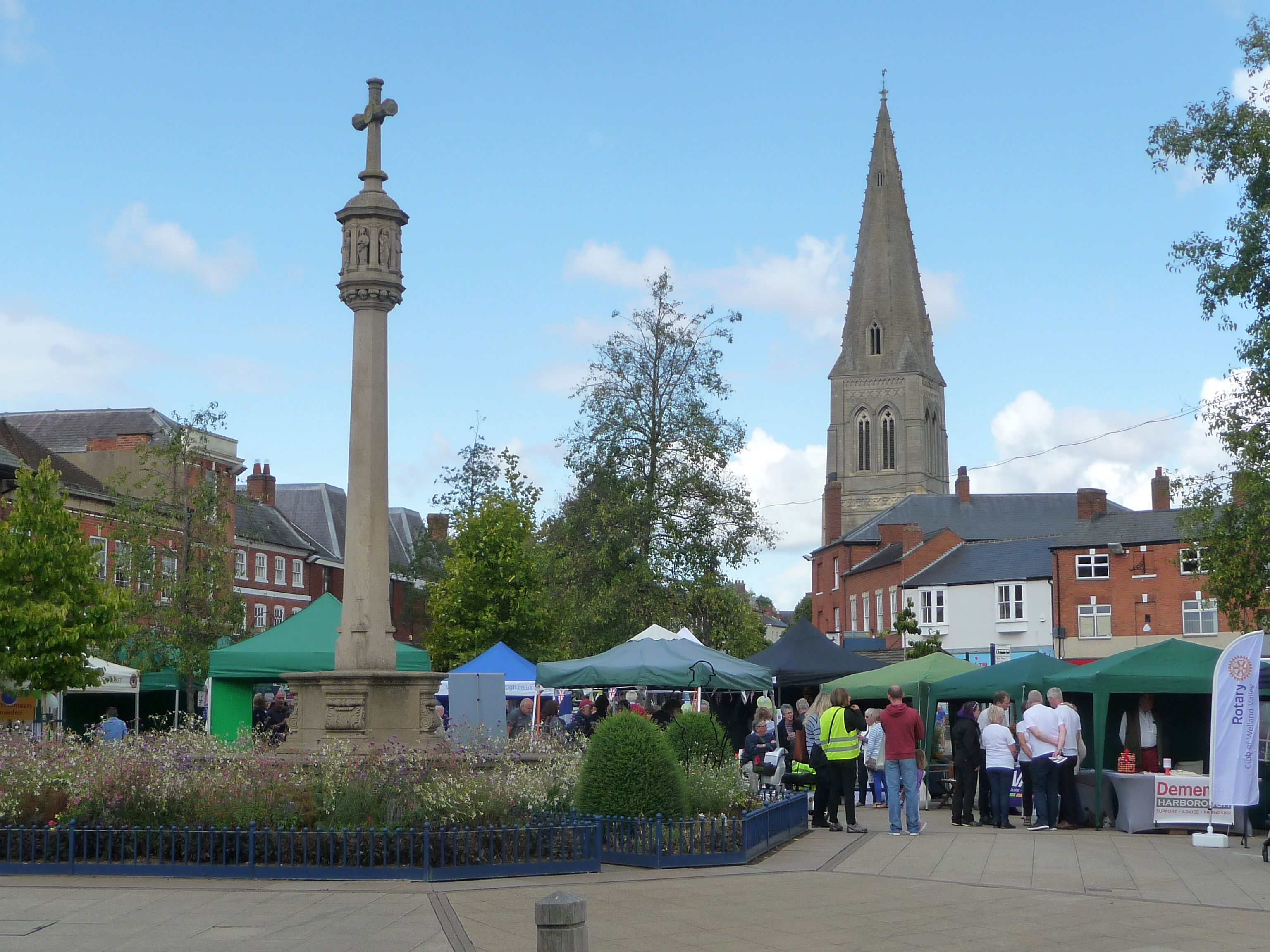
- Market Harborough, the largest settlement and administrative centre of the district

- Shown within Leicestershire
- Sovereign state: United Kingdom
- Constituent country: England
- Region: East Midlands
- Administrative county: Leicestershire
- Admin. HQ: Market Harborough

Government
  - Type: Harborough District Council
  - MPs: Alberto Costa, Alicia Kearns, Neil O'Brien

Area
  - Total: 229 sq mi (592 km^{2})
  - Rank: 61st

Population (2025)
  - Total: 106,577
  - Rank: Ranked 232nd
  - Density: 466/sq mi (180/km^{2})

Ethnicity (2021)
  - Ethnic groups: List: 91% White; 5.4% Asian; 2.1% Mixed; 0.8% other; 0.7% Black

Religion (2021)
  - Religion: List: 53.1% Christianity; 40.6% no religion; 5.1% other; 1.2% Islam
- Time zone: UTC+0 (Greenwich Mean Time)
  - Summer (DST): UTC+1 (British Summer Time)
- ONS code: 31UD (ONS); E07000131 (GSS)
- Ethnicity: 97.9% White

Harborough (/ˈhɑːrbərə/) is a local government district in Leicestershire, England. It is named after its main town, Market Harborough, which is where the council is based. The district also includes the town of Lutterworth and numerous villages and surrounding rural areas. In the north of the district it includes parts of the Leicester Urban Area, notably at Thurnby, Bushby and Scraptoft. Covering 230 square miles (600 km^{2}), the district is the largest by area of the eight districts in Leicestershire and covers almost a quarter of the county.

The neighbouring districts are Blaby, Oadby and Wigston, Leicester, Charnwood, Melton, Rutland, North Northamptonshire, West Northamptonshire and Rugby.

== History ==
The district was created on 1 April 1974 under the Local Government Act 1972, covering the area of four former districts, which were all abolished at the same time:

- Billesdon Rural District
- Lutterworth Rural District
- Market Harborough Rural District
- Market Harborough Urban District

The new council was named Harborough, after its largest town of Market Harborough.

== Abolition ==
Under current local government reform plans, the district will be abolished in 2028 with its area being split between an enlarged Leicester unitary authority and a Leicestershire and Rutland unitary.

== Governance ==
Harborough District Council

Type
- Type: Non-metropolitan district

History
- Founded: 1 April 1974

Leadership
- Chair: Buddy Anderson, Independent since 18 May 2026
- Leader: Simon Whelband, Conservative since 20 April 2026
- Chief Executive: John Richardson since 11 December 2023

Structure
- Seats: 34 councillors
- Graph of the party split among 34 seats.
- Political groups: Administration (15) Conservative (15) Other parties (19) Liberal Democrats (7) Green (3) Labour (2) Reform (2) Restore (1) Independent (4)
- Length of term: 4 years

Elections
- Voting system: First-past-the-post
- Last election: 4 May 2023

Meeting place
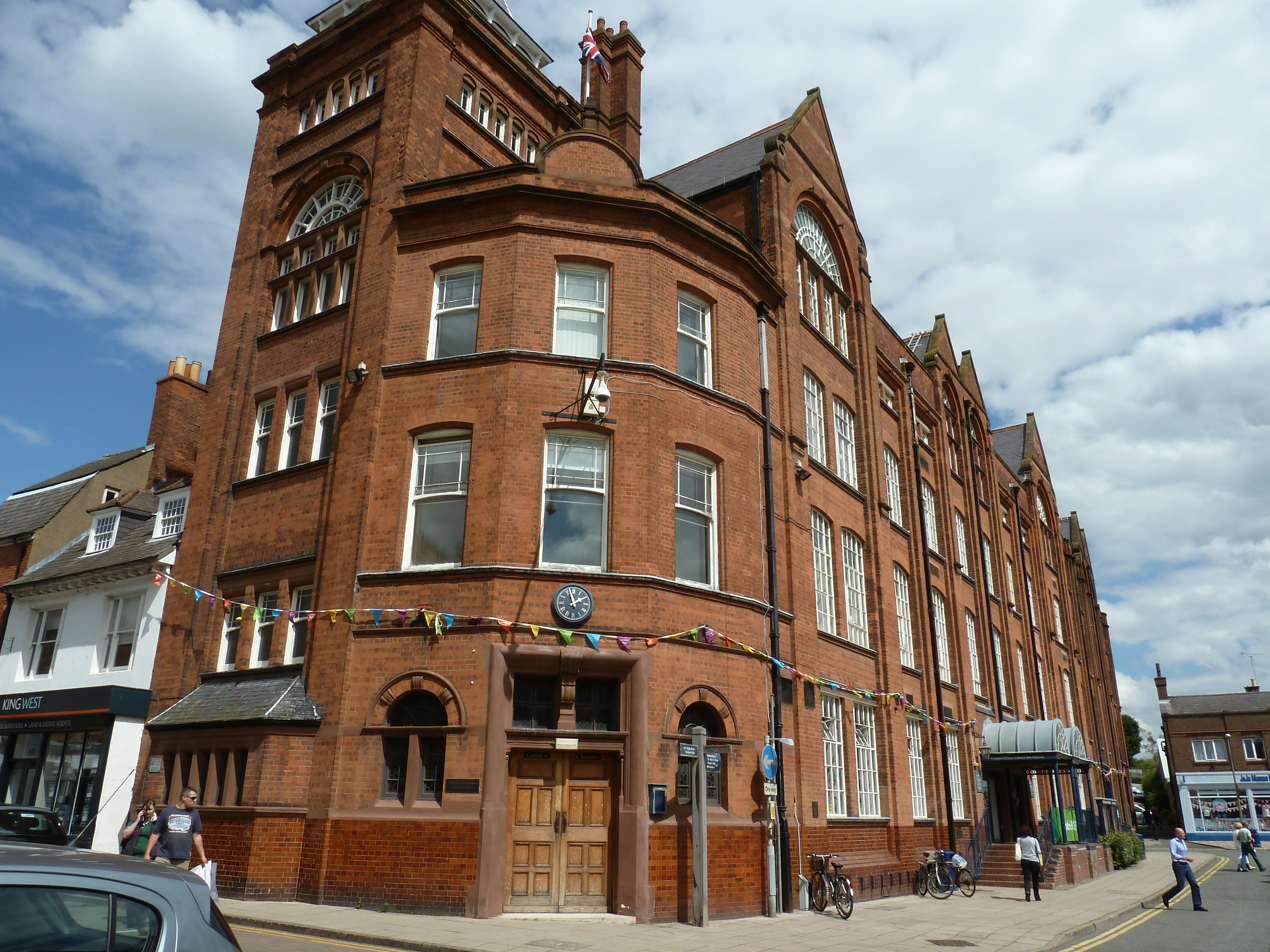
- The Symington Building, Adam and Eve Street, Market Harborough, LE16 7AG

Website
- www.harborough.gov.uk

Harborough District Council provides district-level services. County-level services are provided by Leicestershire County Council. Much of the district is also covered by civil parishes, which form a third tier of local government.

=== Political control ===
The council has been under no overall control since the 2023 election. In April 2026, a Conservative minority administration took control of the council.

The first election to the council was held in 1973, initially operating as a shadow authority alongside the outgoing authorities before coming into its powers on 1 April 1974. Since 1974 political control of the council has been as follows:

Party in control	Years
Conservative	1974–1987
No overall control	1987–2007
Conservative	2007–2023
No overall control	2023–present

=== Leadership ===
The leaders of the council since 2000 have been:

Councillor	Party	From	To
John Fort	Conservative	2000	May 2003
Robin Totten	Liberal Democrats	28 May 2003	10 May 2006
Simon Galton	Liberal Democrats	10 May 2006	May 2007
Graham Hart	Conservative	16 May 2007	Aug 2008
Alistair Swatridge	Conservative	8 Sep 2008	2009
Michael Rook	Conservative	25 Jan 2010	20 May 2013
Blake Pain	Conservative	20 May 2013	18 Sep 2017
Neil Bannister	Conservative	12 Oct 2017	20 May 2019
Phil King	Conservative	20 May 2019	May 2023
Phil Knowles	Liberal Democrats	15 May 2023	20 Apr 2026
Simon Whelband	Conservative	20 Apr 2026	

=== Composition ===
Following the 2023 election, and subsequent changes of allegiance up to July 2026, the composition of the council was:

Party	Seats
Conservative	15
Liberal Democrats	7
Green	3
Labour	2
Reform	2
Restore	1
Independent	4
Total	34

=== Elections ===
Since the last boundary changes in 2019 the council has comprised 34 councillors, representing 19 wards, with each ward electing one, two or three councillors. Elections are held every four years.

=== Premises ===
Harborough District Council is based at the Symington Building, located in the centre of Market Harborough. The building was originally a corset factory, built in 1884. The council purchased the building in 1980 and converted it to become its offices and meeting place, as well as providing a new library for the town. The building is also shared with Harborough Museum, the register office and Job Centre Plus.

== Geography ==
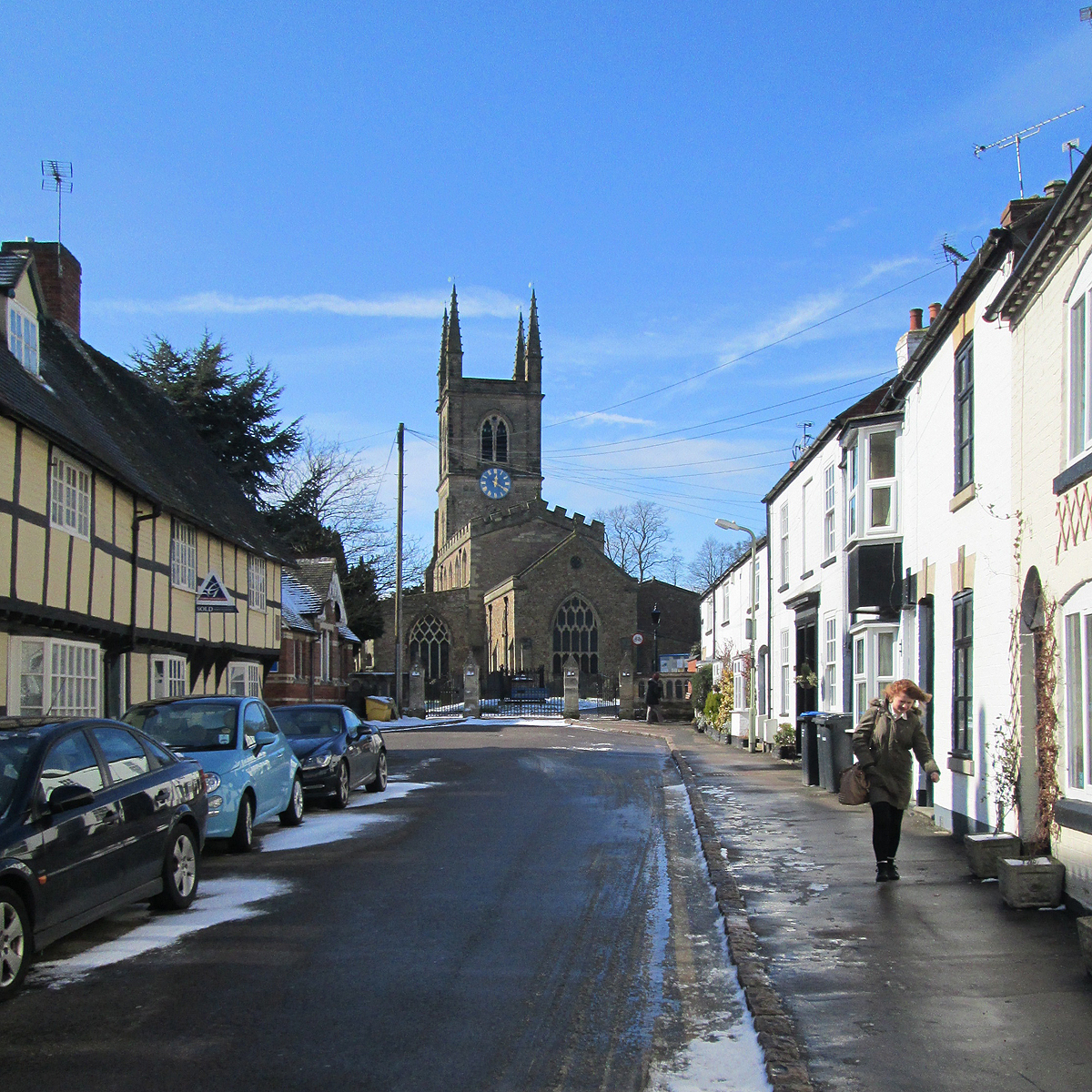
Lutterworth, the only other town in the district and the second-largest settlement

Situated in the south of East Midlands but linking to Northamptonshire and the South East Region, and between the West Midland and East of England Region with access to three national transport routes - the M1 motorway the Midland Main Line railway and the A14 East West national trunk road, the district has always occupied an important strategic position.

The landscape of the district comprises both pastoral and upland characters. Generally the A6 Market Harborough to Leicester Road forms the boundary between each. The lower pastoral landscape of South Leicestershire is found to the west of the A6 whilst the more undulating upland landscape of High Leicestershire is found to the east.

South Leicestershire consists of gentler country around Lutterworth and Kibworth. Low hills swell out of shallow valleys and villages are pinpointed by church spires peeping above dark spinneys. Near Foxton and Gumley the Laughton Hills tumble down to the Grand Union Canal and Welland Valley, forming one of the best landscapes in this part of the district.

High Leicestershire consists of the tract of land between Market Harborough, Tilton On The Hill and towards Melton Mowbray and forms some of the loneliest countryside in the Midlands. Many villages were deserted centuries ago and remote hills such as Robin-a-Tiptoe in the parish of Tilton peer out over pastures and the occasional farmhouse.

The infant River Avon and River Welland form the southern border of the district with Northamptonshire with sources at Naseby and Sibbertoft respectively.

Brampton Valley Way, the former Northampton to Market Harborough Railway, is now a car free 'linear' park. It provides a 14 mile long walking, cycling and, in parts, horse riding route.

== Demography ==
Despite Harborough District being the largest in Leicestershire by area it is primarily rural in nature and its population density is relatively low. Population growth for the district is set out below:

Population growth in Harborough District
Year	1951	1961	1971	1981	1991	2001	2011	2016	2021	2031
Population	42,469	51,390	58.093	59,941	67,601	76,598	85,382	90,400	94,000	101,000
Census								ONS	ONS Projections	

The principal centres of population (from 2011 census) are Market Harborough (21,894), Lutterworth (9,353) and Broughton Astley (8,940) to the south of the district and county. There are four large villages of over 3,000 population - Kibworth (5,455); Fleckney (4,894); Great Glen (3,662) and Thurnby and Bushby (3,301) - these evidence the transition from the relatively densely populated Leicester Urban Area into the countryside/farmland of rural Harborough. Other villages include Scraptoft (1,804), Houghton on the Hill (1,524), Husbands Bosworth (1,145), Great Bowden (1,017), Gilmorton (976), Ullesthorpe (903) and Billesdon (901). The District has 17 parishes with populations between 500 and 3,000, 40 parishes with populations between 100 and 500 and 28 parishes with populations of below 100 (mid-2004 population estimates).

== Built heritage ==
Stanford Hall, Leicestershire is located in the south west of the district. The village of Stanford-on-Avon is in Northamptonshire but the house and park are on the Leicestershire bank of the River Avon.

The Grand Union Canal (old) cuts across the district from Husbands Bosworth to Newton Harcourt with a spur to Market Harborough which leaves the Canal at Foxton.

Hallaton Treasure: More than 5,000 silver and gold coins, around 2,000 years old, were found at a site near Hallaton around 2002. The internationally important finds are exhibited at Harborough Museum.

The Eyebrook Reservoir straddles along the Harborough District's border with the county of Rutland. The reservoir serves as a popular trout fishing area and bird watching area, with nearby Eye Brook Valley Woods as a natural and small forest area for walking. The Reservoir and woods are cared for by the Leicestershire and Rutland Wildlife Trust and are SSSIs.

== Social and sporting ==
The Harborough District has a long association with fox hunting and is the base for the Fernie Hunt. Although hunting wild animals with dogs has stopped following the Hunting Act 2004, the Fernie Hunt continues to operate under the three principal exemptions to the Act - trail hunting, hound exercise and flushing coverts to a bird of prey. A historical account of fox hunting in the Harborough District (when the hunt was known as Mr Fernie's Billesdon Hunt) is available in the book Annals of the Billesdon hunt (Mr. Fernie's) 1856-1913 : notable runs and incidents of the chase, prominent members, celebrated hunters and hounds, amusing stories and anecdotes by F. Palliser de Costobadie. Also see an earlier guide to the fox hunting country north of Market Harborough published in 1882.

== Community organisations ==
The Harborough Youth Council was set up in 2007 to represent the views of young people (aged 13–19) and aims to improve life for young people. It holds a District Youth Conference each year where young people give their views in front of district councillors. The HYC meets usually once per month, and sends representatives to CYCLe (County Youth Council Leicestershire).

The Harborough District Sport and Activity Alliance aims to make sport and physical activity accessible for all people throughout the Harborough District enabling them to fulfil their potential through sport and physical activity.

== Civil parishes ==
Most of the district is covered by civil parishes. The pre-1974 urban district of Market Harborough is an unparished area. The parish council for Lutterworth has declared that parish to be a town, allowing it to take the style "town council". Many of the smaller parishes have a parish meeting rather than a parish council.

- Allexton, Arnesby, Ashby Magna, Ashby Parva
- Billesdon, Bitteswell with Bittesby, Blaston, Bringhurst, Broughton Astley, Bruntingthorpe, Burton Overy
- Carlton Curlieu, Catthorpe, Claybrooke Magna, Claybrooke Parva, Cold Newton, Cotesbach, Cranoe
- Drayton, Dunton Bassett, East Langton, East Norton
- Fleckney, Foxton, Frisby, Frolesworth
- Gaulby, Gilmorton, Glooston, Goadby, Great Bowden, Great Easton, Great Glen, Gumley
- Hallaton, Horninghold, Houghton on the Hill, Hungarton, Husbands Bosworth
- Illston on the Hill
- Keyham, Kibworth Beauchamp, Kibworth Harcourt, Kimcote and Walton, King's Norton, Knaptoft
- Laughton, Launde, Leire, Little Stretton, Loddington, Lowesby, Lubenham, Lutterworth
- Marefield, Medbourne, Misterton with Walcote, Mowsley
- Nevill Holt, North Kilworth, Noseley
- Owston and Newbold
- Peatling Magna, Peatling Parva
- Rolleston
- Saddington, Scraptoft, Shangton, Shawell, Shearsby, Skeffington, Slawston, Smeeton Westerby, South Kilworth, Stockerston, Stonton Wyville, Stoughton, Swinford
- Theddingworth, Thorpe Langton, Thurnby and Bushby, Tilton on the Hill, Tugby and Keythorpe, Tur Langton
- Ullesthorpe
- Welham, West Langton, Westrill and Starmore, Willoughby Waterleys, Wistow, Withcote
