= Rolleston, Leicestershire =

Village in Leicestershire, England

Coordinates: 52.60157°N 0.92062°W

Rolleston
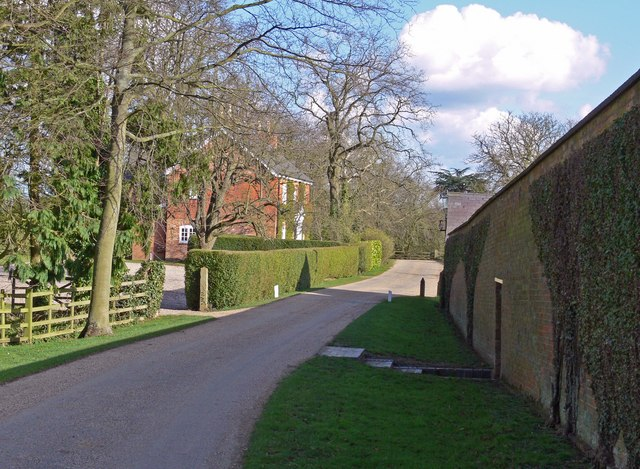
- Rolleston

- Location within Leicestershire
- Population: (2001 census)
- Civil parish: Rolleston
- District: Harborough
- Shire county: Leicestershire
- Region: East Midlands
- Country: England
- Sovereign state: United Kingdom
- Post town: LEICESTER
- Postcode district: LE7
- Police: Leicestershire
- Fire: Leicestershire
- Ambulance: East Midlands
- UK Parliament: Rutland and Stamford

Rolleston is a parish and estate village near Billesdon in Leicestershire, England, and part of Harborough district. The population of the village is included in the civil parish of Skeffington.
