= Frolesworth =

Village in Leicestershire, England

Coordinates: 52.51337°N 1.25487°W

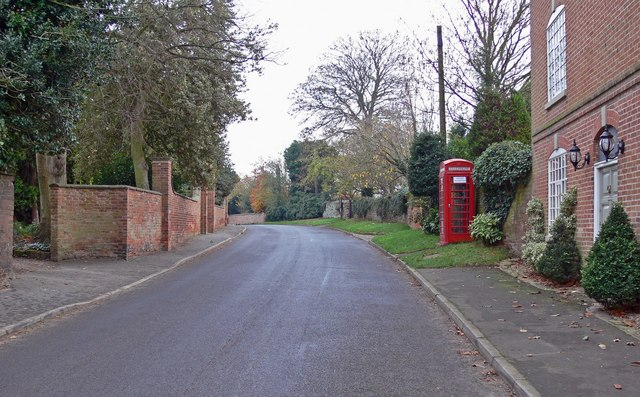

- Location within Leicestershire
- OS grid reference: SP508990
- Civil parish: Frolesworth
- District: Harborough
- Shire county: Leicestershire
- Region: East Midlands
- Country: England
- Sovereign state: United Kingdom
- Post town: LUTTERWORTH
- Postcode district: LE17
- Dialling code: 01455
- Police: Leicestershire
- Fire: Leicestershire
- Ambulance: East Midlands
- UK Parliament: South Leicestershire

Frolesworth is a small village and civil parish in the Harborough district of Leicestershire, England. It lies four miles north of Lutterworth, three from Broughton Astley and eighteen miles west of Market Harborough. The population is included in the Thurlaston civil parish.

The village's name means 'enclosure of Freothulf'.

A public footpath located near the side entrance of Hall Farm and from the church grounds provides wide views across surrounding countryside. The Leicestershire Round footpath crosses the parish and additional footpaths have been created around the artificial lake in the fields of Manor Farm. The majority of the parish buildings are aligned with or set back from the single main street in the village; with a small number of outlying farms, homes and businesses making up the total of eighty or so properties. The village's boundary has changed little over two hundred years, with virtually all twentieth-century properties being infill sites along the main street. At the centre of the village is St Nicholas Church. The church commands the highest ground in the village; its tower is a local landmark when approaching the village during the day and at night when the church is lit with amber lights. From the season of 2008/09, the birth of its village's first football club, Frolesworth United was founded by the youngest chairman in the history of English football, Sam Jacques at the age of 19. Currently in a relegation battle in the Alliance Division One under the management of Rodney Jacques.
