= Ullesthorpe =

Village in Leicestershire, England

Coordinates: 52.485°N 1.255°W

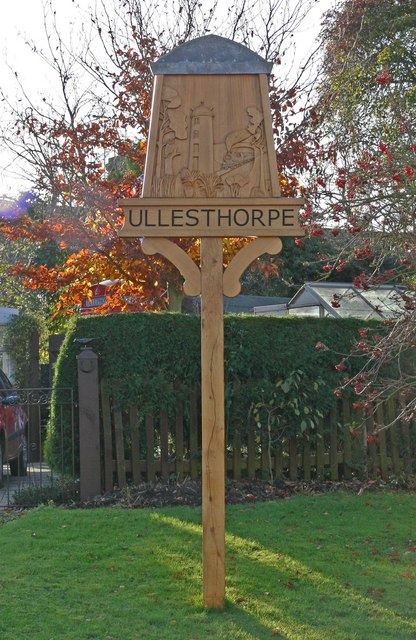
- Ullesthorpe village sign

- Location within Leicestershire
- Interactive map of Ullesthorpe
- Population: 1,163 (2021 Census)
- Civil parish: Ullesthorpe
- District: Harborough
- Shire county: Leicestershire
- Region: East Midlands
- Country: England
- Sovereign state: United Kingdom
- Post town: Lutterworth
- Postcode district: LE17
- Dialling code: 01455
- Police: Leicestershire
- Fire: Leicestershire
- Ambulance: East Midlands
- Website: www.ullesthorpeparishcouncil.gov.uk

Ullesthorpe is a small village and civil parish situated in the Harborough district in southern Leicestershire. Ullesthorpe is noted for its historic background with a mill, disused railway station and traces of a medieval settlement evident on the edge of the village.

== Geography ==
Located 10 miles north of Rugby, Ullesthorpe is within easy access of the M1, M69 and M6.

Local amenities include a primary school, post office, village shop, butchers, doctors surgery, hairdressers, garden centre, congregational church, two pubs and a golf course associated with the 'Ullesthorpe Court Hotel'.

== History ==
Many prehistoric items have been located in and around Ullesthorpe, this includes flint tools found by the Lutterworth Archaeological Fieldwork Group. This indicates a settlement was located here during the prehistoric period. There is significant evidence that Romans came to Ullesthorpe in the 1st century AD because Roman coins, roof tiles and pottery have been recovered, as well as nearby Roman roads.

After the fall of the Romans, settlers from the continent and Scandinavia began to move to Ullesthorpe. At certain times, the Saxons controlled the local area. However, a major influence came from the Danes. The name "Ullesthorpe" derives from Old Scandinavian which means "the settlement of a man called Ulfr". Other villages near Ullesthorpe were also highly influenced by the Danes and therefore their names are derived from the Scandinavian language as well.

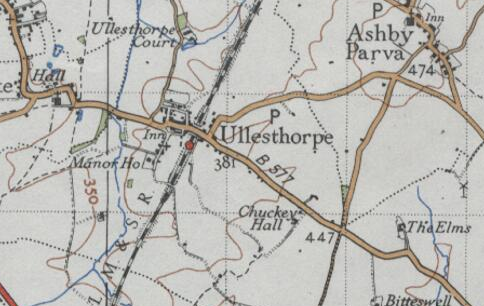
1945 Ordnance Survey of Ullesthorpe and the surrounding area.

== Parish ==
In 1870-1872- John Marius Wilson's described Ullesthorpe as: "A hamlet in Claybrooke parish, Leicester; on the Rugby and Leicester railway, 3¼ miles NW of Lutterworth".

Until the mid 19th century, Ullesthorpe was a minor settlement within the Ancient Parish of Claybrook. Other villages included Claybrooke Magna, Claybrooke Parva, and Wibtoft. These four villages formed the parish of St Peter's Church Claybrooke. However, deemed under the 1866 Act, many villages became their own civil parish. Although Ullesthorpe is still part of St Peter's Parish Church, Ullesthorpe now has its own civil parish where people are elected into Ullesthorpe Parish Council who form a local government unit and control finances within the local village.

== Ullesthorpe Railway station ==
Ullesthorpe used to have a railway station which served the Midland Counties Railway. Passed by Parliament on 21 June 1836, Ullesthorpe railway station was opened on 1 July 1840, serving between Leicester and Rugby. Originally named Ullesthorpe, the railway station name has been changed on a number of occasions. On 1 May 1879, it was renamed "Ullesthorpe for Lutterworth", being changed to "Ullesthorpe and Lutterworth" on 1 August 1897. Eventually it was changed backed to its original name on 1 February 1930. It was renowned for earning the award for the best kept station and won the area award in 1953 with a variety of red, white and blue flower displays. However, on 30 December 1961, the railway station was closed as part of the closure of the Leicester to Rugby railway line. Even since the closure of the railway about 50 years ago, the disused railway line is still in existence.

== Ullesthorpe Mill ==
In 1800, by subscription, a five-story tower mill was built. The original mill had two pairs of millstones, with an extra one being added in 1838. The main purpose of the mill was the milling of corn which was a main source of employment in the 19th century. Consequently, this led to a rapid increase in the number of people living in Ullesthorpe with the village population increasing from 494 in 1801 to 600 in 1821. However, in the late 1890s, production ceased and this led to the closure of the mill. After the closure of mill, the tower was preserved because it was listed as a Grade II building. Through funding from the National Lottery, Ullesthorpe Preservation Trust was set up. Ullesthorpe Preservation Trust decided to transform the disused mill into a small museum with displays and study facilities. Over the last three years, considerable effort has been put in place to open the mill up to the public, which has brought much interest to the area despite the limited work. Through the work of Ullesthorpe Preservation trust, the mill is open to the public for several weekends throughout the year. It has proved to be a valuable learning resource, enabling people to learn more about the history of Ullesthorpe, which beforehand lacked any historic buildings or museums.

== Demographics ==
Population

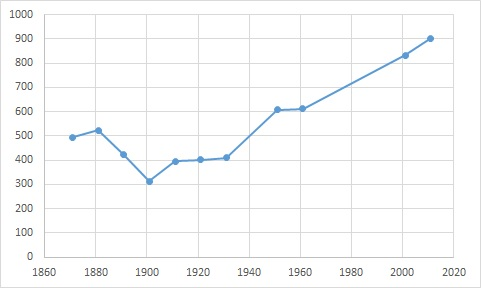
Total Population of Ullesthorpe Civil Parish, Leicestershire, as reported by Neighbourhood Statistics and Vision of Britain from 1871 to 2011.

Prior to the release of accurate census records, a population count counted 494 people living in Ullesthorpe in 1801. With the opening of the mill in 1800, this led to a rapid increase in the number of people living within the local area because of the employment opportunities. This led to a population increase of 600 in 1821. However, after the close of the mills in the late 1890s, population figures fell again. When accurate census records were introduced in 1881, it is evident from the graph, that there was a fluctuation in population figures. In 1881, the population was recorded as 523. However, by 1911, the population count had sharply declined to 312, but in recent years, this has been on the increase. The population, based on the 2011 census, indicated 903 people lived in Ullesthorpe. In 2021 the census showed a pronounced increase to 1,163 residents.

Occupation structure

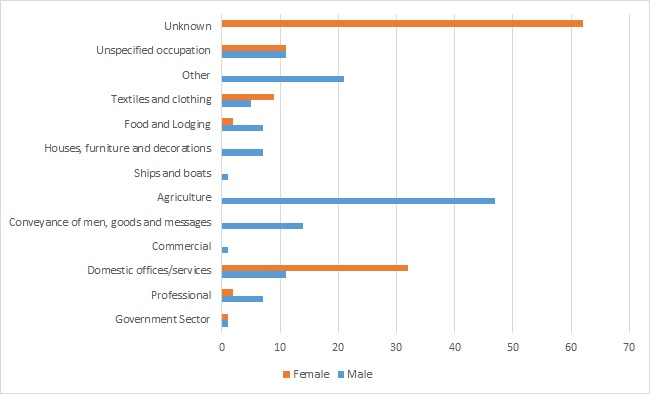
Occupation structure of males and females in Ullesthorpe in 1881.

The chart to the right indicates what occupation males and females from Ullesthorpe had in 1881. The chart evidently indicates that the predominant male job was within the agriculture sector with 47 people (35%). On the other hand, the predominant role for women was within the domestic office/services with 32 people (27%). However, we cannot be certain with this percentage because 62 women's occupations were unknown in the 1881 census.

In comparison, the 2011 census data reveals that agriculture and domestic roles are on the decline. The predominant roles within the male sector were professionals and technicians (34.9%), skilled tradesmen (21.7%) and managers and senior officers (18.8%). For women, the main roles were professionals (20.4%) and administrative/secretarial occupations (20.4%).

Evidently, in the last 120 years, occupations for both males and females have changed dramatically.

== Notable places ==
Ullesthorpe C of E Primary School- is a primary school ranging from the age of 4–11 years old, as well as a pre-school for 2-3 year olds. As of March 2014, there were 88 students enrolled at the school. In its recent Ofsted inspection in 2014, the school received a good report.

Ullesthorpe Congregational Chapel- is home to the Ullesthorpe Congregational church which was founded in 1806. The church was built in 1825.

Ullesthorpe Court Hotel- 17th Century manor house refurbished into a modern country home with 72 hotel rooms. The hotel also has its own 18 hole golf course.
