= West Langton =

Civil parish in Leicestershire, England

Coordinates: 52.526°N 0.940°W

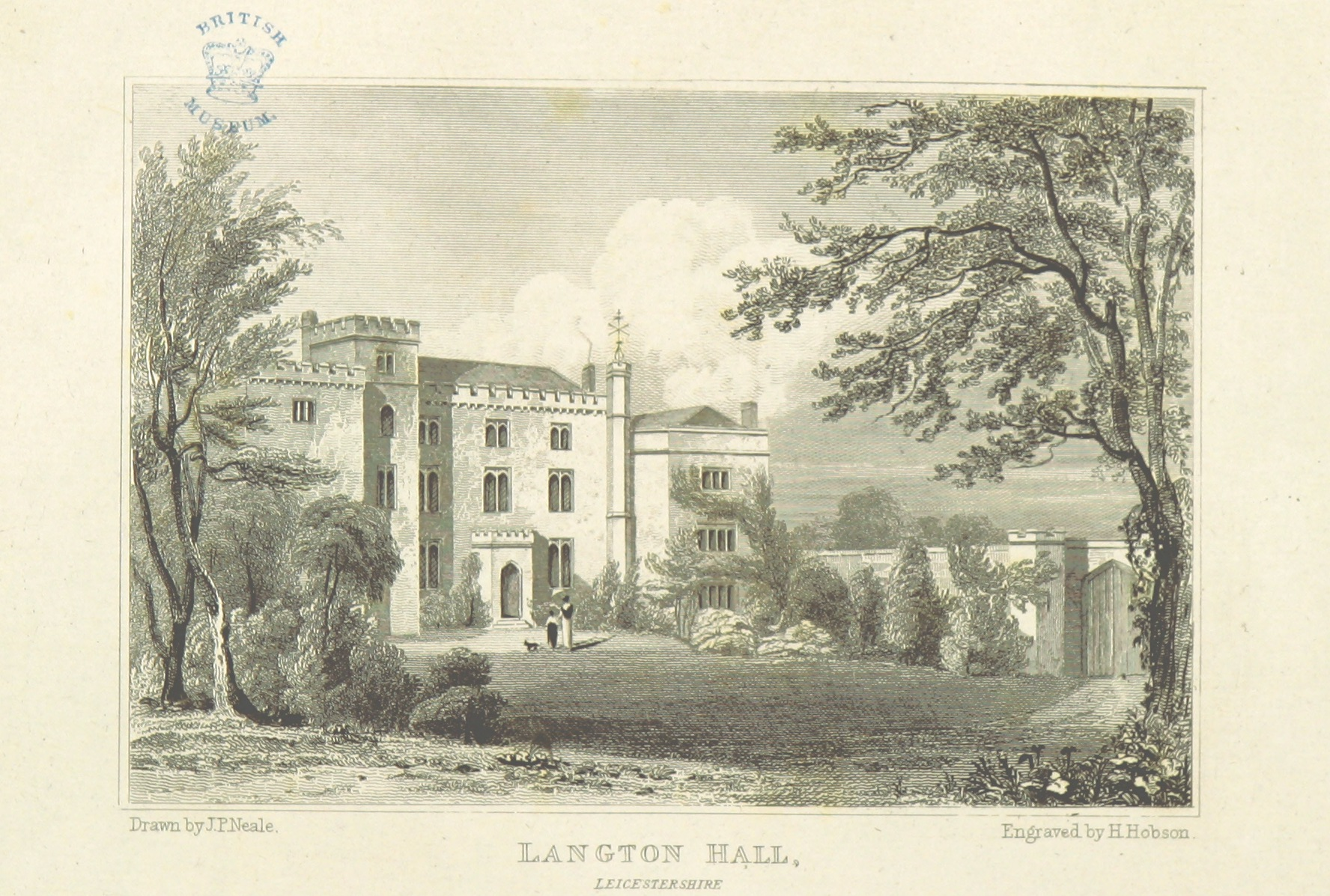
Langton Hall, depicted in 1818

West Langton is a civil parish in the Harborough district of Leicestershire, England. The main settlement in the parish is Langton Hall (not to be confused with another Langton Hall, in Langton, North Yorkshire.)

West Langton is near Kibworth and Market Harborough, and the parish according to the 2001 census had a population of 128.

== See also ==
- East Langton / Church Langton
