= Thomas Jenner =

Thomas Jenner may refer to:

- Thomas Jenner (judge) (1637–1707), English barrister and judge
- Thomas Jenner (theologian) (1689–1768), English theologian
- Thomas Jenner (publisher) (died 1673), English author, engraver, and publisher
