= Gaulby =

Village in Leicestershire, England

Coordinates: 52.603°N 0.980°W

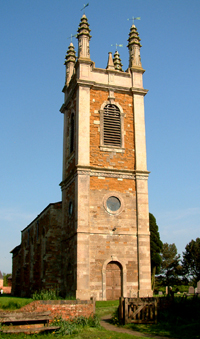
- Gaulby Church

- Location within Leicestershire
- Population: 141 (2011)
- OS grid reference: SK691010
- District: Harborough
- Shire county: Leicestershire
- Region: East Midlands
- Country: England
- Sovereign state: United Kingdom
- Post town: LEICESTER
- Postcode district: LE7
- Police: Leicestershire
- Fire: Leicestershire
- Ambulance: East Midlands

Gaulby (or Galby) is a village in Leicestershire, England, 7 miles east of the city of Leicester. According to the 2001 census it had a population of 131, (including Frisby). The 2011 census for Gaulby returned 52 houses and 141 residents.

== History ==
The village's name means 'farm/settlement which is gall', probably meaning it had poor, wet ground.

In the Domesday Book of 1086 the village was recorded as Galbi, one of 230 manors in Leicestershire held by Hugh de Grandmesnil. Through the 12th and 13th centuries the manor was held by the Earls of Leicester, the last Earl being John of Gaunt, Duke of Lancaster (died 1399).

Subsequently, the title of Lord of the manor passed to the Marmion family and thence by marriage to the Haselwood family. In 1610 William Whalley, Lord of the manor of King's Norton, Leicestershire, purchased the lands from the Haselwoods for £600. He received 663 acres (300 each of arable and pasture), 8 messuages (substantial dwellings with outbuildings and attached land), 4 cottages, a windmill and a dovecote. Excluded from this purchase were the Rectory and the lands of the Dands and Goodmans. From 1614 Whalley, John Dand and George Goodman, by private agreement, carried out piecemeal land enclosure of the open field system. This process was completed in 1649.

His descendant, Bernard Whalley, died in 1752, and the two manors were inherited by William Fortrey through Fortrey's mother, who was a Whalley. Fortrey financed the rebuilding of the nave and tower of the parish church of St. Peter in 1741. The church had previously been rebuilt in 1520, and from this 16th-century building the chancel and communion rail survive as the then vicar, Thomas Shaw, refused to let Fortrey touch it. The architect was John Wing the Elder (1698-1753).

On Fortrey's death his nephew Henry Green inherited the manors. In 1791 they were sold to Peers Anthony Keck of Stoughton Grange, and they remained in the hands of the Keck family until 1913 when the majority of the land was sold to the Co-Operative Society and the Wyggeston Hospital Charitable Trust.

== Bibliography ==
- "Galby and Frisby". A History of the County of Leicestershire. Vol. 5. London: Victoria County History. 1964.
