= Broadnook =

Village in Leicestershire, England

Coordinates: 52.695°N 1.132°W

Broadnook Garden Village
- Village
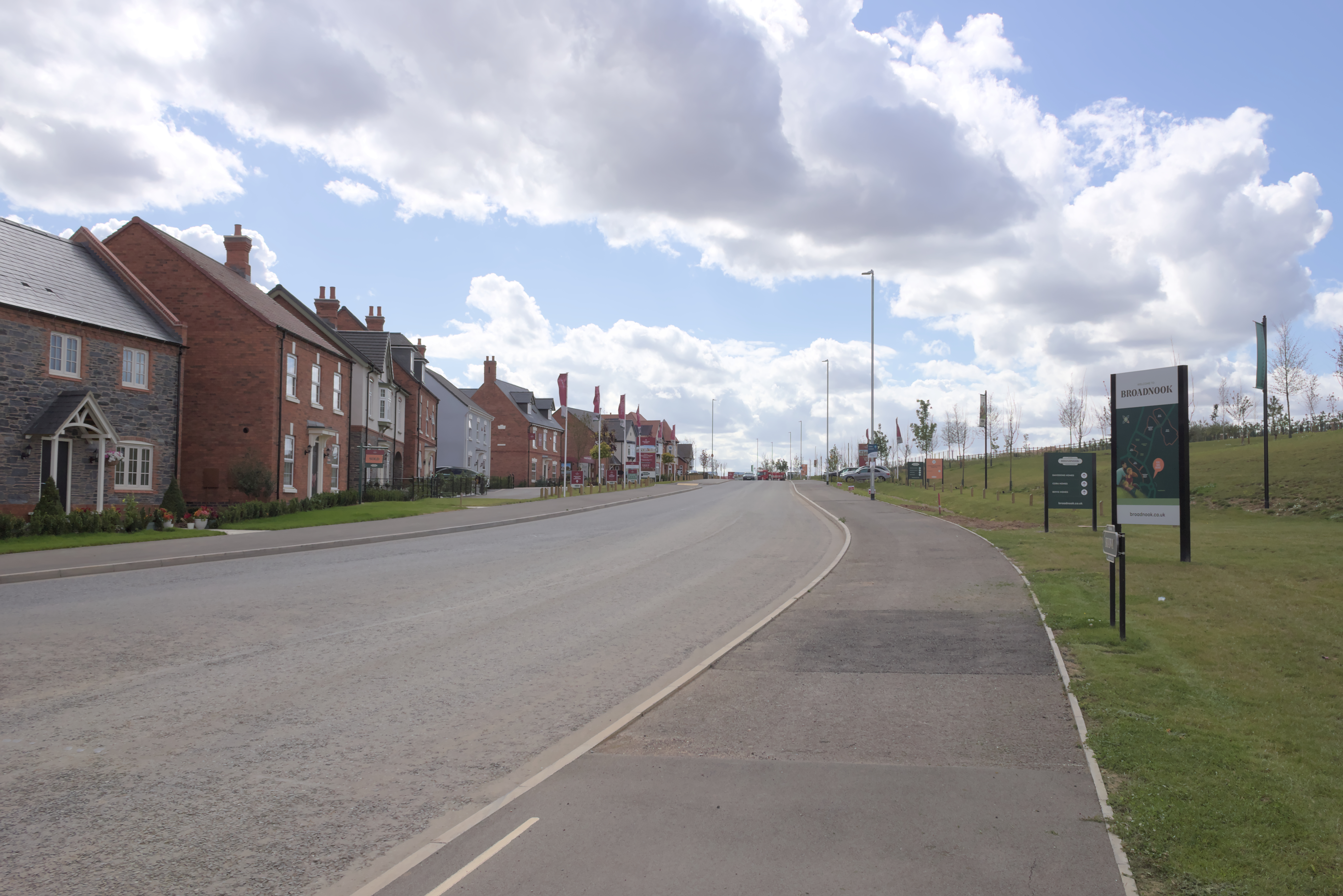
- Broadway

- Location within Leicestershire
- District: Charnwood
- Shire county: Leicestershire
- Region: East Midlands
- Country: England
- Sovereign state: United Kingdom
- Post town: LEICESTER
- Postcode district: LE7
- Dialling code: 0116
- Police: Leicestershire
- Fire: Leicestershire
- Ambulance: East Midlands

Broadnook, officially Broadnook Garden Village, is a village and planned community located in Charnwood, Leicestershire. Described as the "first garden village" in Leicestershire, Broadnook sits directly to the north of Birstall and roughly 4 miles (6.4 km) from Leicester's city centre.

== History ==
The earliest mentions of Broadnook are in Charnwood's local plan, adopted 9 November 2015, under the working title "North of Birstall Direction of Growth". The planning application for the village would be approved in November 2020, with 460 acres required for the project being sold to its developers in July 2022; more than 2,000 homes are planned, alongside a business park and other amenities. Construction works on the site would begin in early 2023.

Plans to establish a new civil parish for Broadnook were approved on 15 June 2026, with the council set to be established on 1 April 2027; Broadnook currently sits within the civil parishes of Rothley, Thurcaston and Cropston, and Wanlip. Broadnook has been maintained by the charitable trust Broadnook Community Trust since April 2023.
