= Misterton with Walcote =

Civil parish in Leicestershire, England

Coordinates: 52.45193°N 1.16472°W

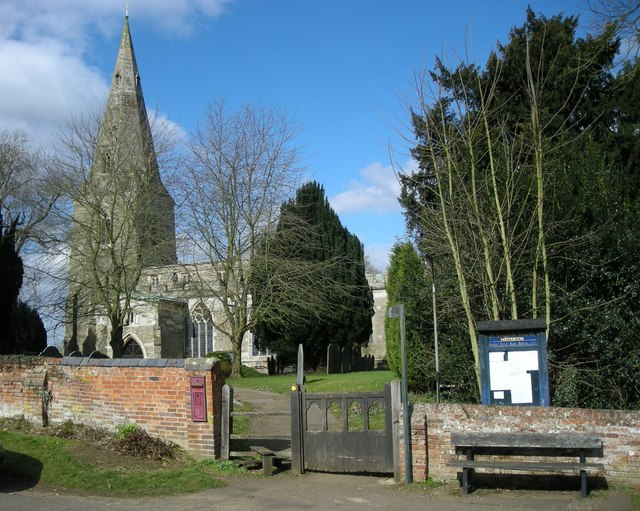
- St Leonards Church, Misterton

- Location within Leicestershire
- Population: 486 (2011 Census)
- OS grid reference: SP568841
- Civil parish: Misterton with Walcote
- District: Harborough
- Shire county: Leicestershire
- Region: East Midlands
- Country: England
- Sovereign state: United Kingdom
- Post town: LUTTERWORTH
- Postcode district: LE17
- Police: Leicestershire
- Fire: Leicestershire
- Ambulance: East Midlands

Misterton with Walcote, formerly just Misterton is a civil parish in the English county of Leicestershire. The population of the civil parish at the 2011 census was 486.

It forms part of the Harborough district. Of its two settlements Walcote is by far the larger, but Misterton has the parish church.

Walcote is on the A4304 road some two miles east of the town of Lutterworth and a mile east of Junction 20 of the M1 motorway.

The village has one public house, The Black Horse, which re-opened in 2017. The Tavern is now a private dwelling.

== History ==
The parish was renamed from "Misterton" to "Misterton with Walcote" on 1 April 1995.
