= Illston on the Hill =

Village in Leicestershire, England

Coordinates: 52.58626°N 0.95821°W

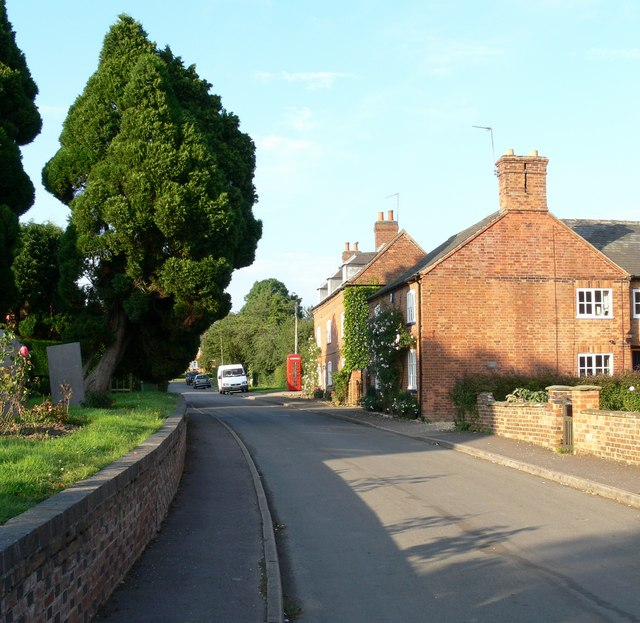
- Main Street, Illston

- Location within Leicestershire
- Population: 179 (2011)
- OS grid reference: SP706992
- District: Harborough
- Shire county: Leicestershire
- Region: East Midlands
- Country: England
- Sovereign state: United Kingdom
- Post town: LEICESTER
- Postcode district: LE7
- Police: Leicestershire
- Fire: Leicestershire
- Ambulance: East Midlands
- UK Parliament: Harborough, Oadby and Wigston

Illston on the Hill is a small village and parish seven miles north of Market Harborough in the county of Leicestershire. The population of the civil parish at the 2011 census (including Carlton Curlieu) was 179. The old part of Illston is a rare "dead end" village: literally, at the end of the road which leads to it. Illston also has a village hall available for rent. In the summer it hosts events including a Village Fete and 'Onion Sunday'.
