= Slawston =

Village in Leicestershire, England

Coordinates: 52.542°N 0.854°W

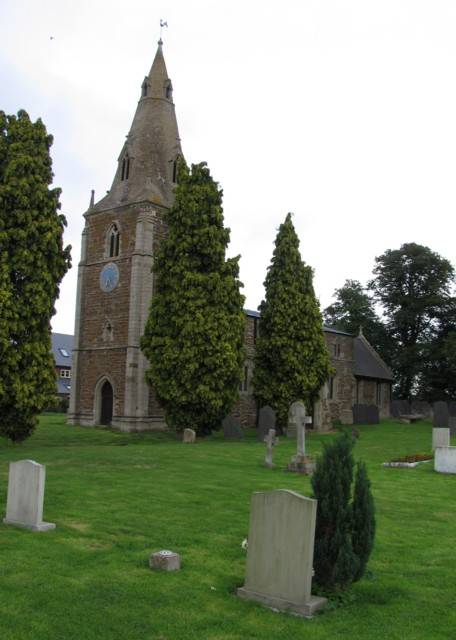
- All Saints church, Slawston

- Location within Leicestershire
- Population: 191 (2011 Census)
- OS grid reference: SP 77821 94435
- District: Harborough
- Shire county: Leicestershire
- Region: East Midlands
- Country: England
- Sovereign state: United Kingdom
- Post town: Market Harborough
- Postcode district: LE16
- Dialling code: 01858
- Police: Leicestershire
- Fire: Leicestershire
- Ambulance: East Midlands
- UK Parliament: Rutland and Stamford

Slawston is a village and civil parish in the Harborough district of Leicestershire, England, north-east of Market Harborough. According to the 2001 census the parish had a population of 143, including Welham and increasing to 191 at the 2011 census. The parish includes the deserted village of Othorpe at grid reference SP770956. Slawston is located roughly 1 km away from Medbourne.

== History ==
In 1870-72, John Marius Wilson's Imperial Gazetteer of England and Wales described Slawston like this:

SLAWSTON, a parish, with a village, in the district of Uppingham and county of Leicester; 2½ miles NW of Medbourne-Bridge r. station, and 5½ NE of Market-Harborough. Post town, Market-Harborough. Acres, 1,510. Real property, £3,241. Pop., 246. Houses, 59. The manor belongs to the Earl of Cardigan. The living is a vicarage in the diocese of Peterborough. Value, £174.* Patron, the Earl of Cardigan. The church is of the 13th century, and has a tower and spire. There is an Independent chapel.

"Slawston, a parish, with a village, in the district of Uppingham and county of Leicester." In Slawston the Anglican parish church is dedicated to All Saints, the church was restored in 1864 and currently seats 168 people. From the Church records the Anglican register dates from 1559, the congregational chapel was built there in 1776 and rebuilt in 1850. Slawston is 18 miles south east of Leicester on the southern edge of the hills which overlooks the valley of Welland and adjoining the county boundary with Northamptonshire. This parish includes the deserted hamlet of Orthorpe. The village lies at over 300 ft and Slawston hills (also known as Mill, Barrow or Burrough Hill) exceeds 400 ft. The south of the parish is below 250 ft; the low-lying ground adjoining the Welland is liable to flooding. The soil is a stiff clay overlaying limestone which in the 18th century was quarried; on Slawston Hill the soil was then described as "fine and red".

== Demographics ==
=== Population ===
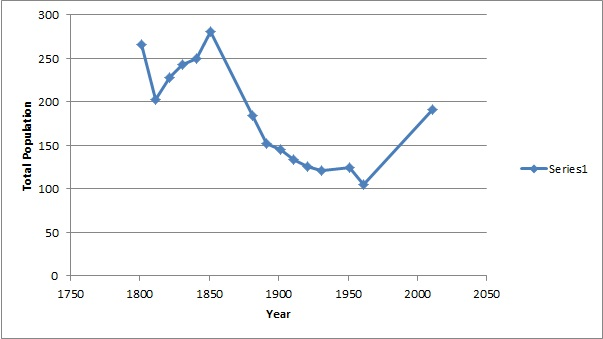
Population graph for Slawston 1801-2011

The earliest census records date back to 1801 with the total population at 266 people. Between 1811 and 1851 the population fluctuated but after 1851 the Parish saw a significant decrease in population, the population went from 281 in 1851 to 145 in 1901. In the early 19th century the population slowly decreased to 124 in 1951, 10 years later in 1961 the population was 105 people. According to the 2011 census, Slawston had a population of 191 people.

=== Occupational History ===
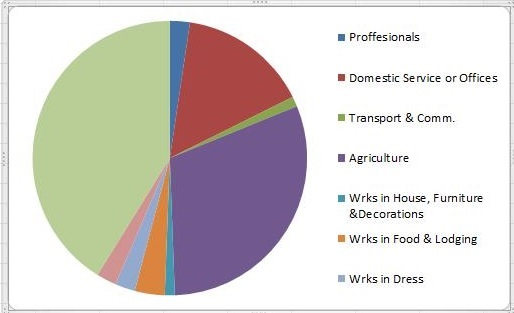
Occupational graph for the population of Slawston in 1881.

This was the most detailed parish-level occupation data ever published by the census as it included information on the precise occupations of the workers. In 1831 the information from the first three censuses was a three-way categorisation of families. A more detailed categorisation was produced although it only was limited to males aged 20 and over, although it does include numbers if male and female servants under 20. The census divides 63 males into nine categories; in 1831, 23 males worked as Agricultural Labourers which was the highest employed occupation from the census. 13 males were employed in Retail and Handicrafts followed closely with Manufacturing employing 10 males. In Slawston there are not any workers in the Capitalists, Professionals or Non-Agricultural Labourers categories but 3 other males were employed but there occupation is classed as unknown. In the 1881 census data it gives information on the occupational orders in Slawston. Although in the 1881 census there are more people employed in each category there was a lower number of people employed in total. In 1881 Agriculture still had the highest number of employees with 26 men working in that category. Across the nine other categories, one to two males were employed in each category. For females, there were none working in Agriculture, Transport and communications, House, furniture and Decorations and dress but 34 females worked in an Unknown occupation, many of these categories combine 'Worker and Dealers' in different marketable items so it is hard to distinguish workers in manufacturing and services. In Slawston in 1881 there were two female professionals and 11 females working in Service or Offices which is a significant difference from males in Slawston.

== Education ==
John Holyoake ran a large boarding school in Slawston in the early 18th Century which had as many as 20 young gentlemen from London and elsewhere. As Holyoake was a land agent (real estate agent) he erected a pew for his students at the west end of the north aisle in the church. In the 19th Century it appears that a school was held in the church, there were notes in the register of baptism records that a school was instituted in 1817 with 45 pupils. Subscriptions were still recorded in 1821 but in 1832 desks which were said to have been used by school-children were ordered to be removed from the communion rails. In 1833 there was only one private day school where 4 boys and 4 girls attended and educated at their parents expense. Also in 1833 an Independent Sunday school opened and was attended by 26 boys and 34 girls. After this Slawston had no schools. Nowadays, it is common for the children of Slawston to attend schools in nearby village Cranhoe which were built in 1843.

== Places of interest ==
=== All Saints Church ===
An Anglican Parish Church which dates back to 1559 and is dedicated to All Saints in the church's register. The church which seats 168 was restored in 1864. A congregational chapel was built there in 1779 and rebuilt in 1850.

=== Slawston Bridge ===
Slawston bridge, at grid reference SP783934, is about 16 miles (26 km) south-east of Leicester and about one and a half miles down Slawston Road. The bridge is the abutments of a former railway bridge from which the span has been demolished. The bridge has become popular for rock climbing. As a climbing area it has of three types of rock; ironstone, gritstone and smooth blue engineers bricks, offering the best local climbing with some vertical 7 metres (23 ft) heights.

=== Slawston Hill ===
The village is characterised by Slawston Hill at SP782941, 131 metres (430 ft) in height. Slawston Hill is also known as Burrough Hill.
