= Owston and Newbold =

Civil parish in Leicestershire, England

Coordinates: 52.663333°N 0.856389°W

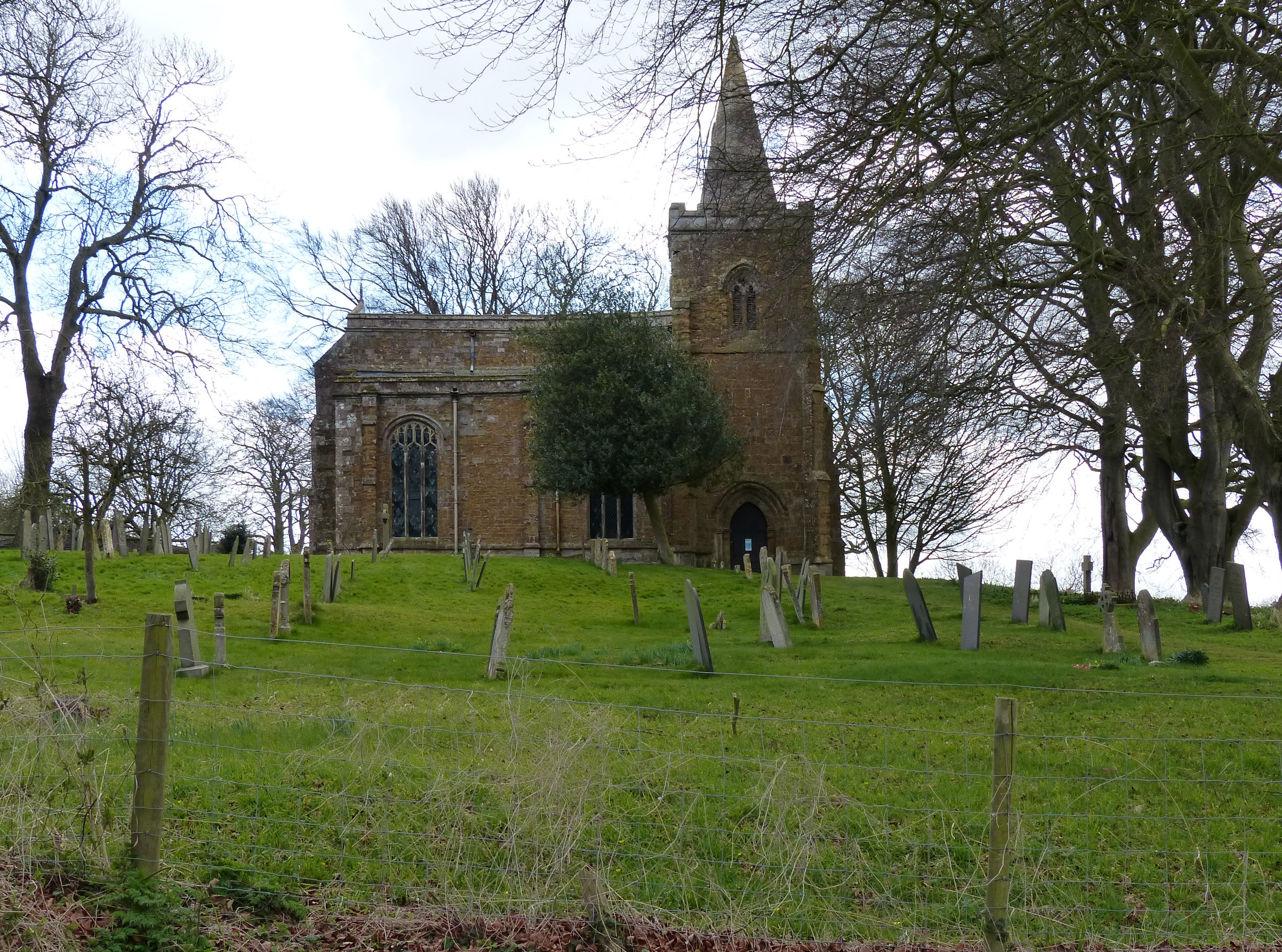
- St Andrew's Church

- Location within Leicestershire
- Population: 112 (2011)
- OS grid reference: SK774079
- Civil parish: Owston and Newbold
- District: Harborough
- Shire county: Leicestershire
- Region: East Midlands
- Country: England
- Sovereign state: United Kingdom
- Post town: OAKHAM
- Postcode district: LE15
- Dialling code: 01664
- Police: Leicestershire
- Fire: Leicestershire
- Ambulance: East Midlands
- UK Parliament: Rutland and Stamford

Owston and Newbold is a civil parish, 5 miles (8 km) west of Oakham in the Harborough district, in the county of Leicestershire, England. The population of the civil parish at the 2011 census (including Marefield) was 112.

The Parish Church of St Andrew, Owston, began as an Augustinian monastic foundation before 1161, and substantial buildings stood around the site of the current church. Owston Abbey was never prosperous, and when dissolved at the reformation had 6 canons. The parish retained a part of the Abbey Church for its use when the rest was demolished, resulting in an unusually proportioned building, with its doorway through the tower on the south side. The relationship between the current church and former monastic arrangements remains uncertain.
