= Claybrooke Parva =

Village in Leicestershire, England

Coordinates: 52°29′N 1°16′W

Claybrooke Parva is a village and civil parish in the Harborough district south west Leicestershire, England close to Claybrooke Magna. The village is the site of a church which is thought to originally be part Anglo Saxon with Norman and Medieval additions. The population of the civil parish at the 2011 census was 208.

The village's name means 'brook with clayey soil'.

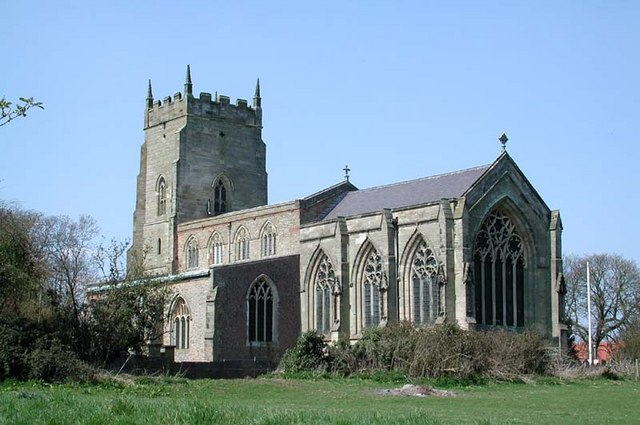
St Peter's Church, Claybrooke Parva
