= Grade I listed buildings in Leicestershire =

Top-level listed buildings in Leicestershire, England

Leicestershire shown within England

There are more than 9,000 Grade I listed buildings in England. This page is a list of these buildings in the county of Leicestershire, by district.

== Blaby ==
Name	Location	Type	Completed (Note: The date given is the date used by Historic England as significant for the initial building or that of an important part in the structure's description.)	Date designated	Grid ref. (Note: The grid reference is based on the British national grid reference system, sometimes known as OSGB36, used by the Ordnance Survey.) Geo-coordinates	Entry number (Note: The "List Entry Number" is a unique number assigned to each listed building and scheduled monument by Historic England.)	Image
Church of All Saints	Blaby, Blaby	Parish Church	Late 13th century to early 14th century	7 October 1957	SP5703097857; 52°34′32″N 1°09′36″W	1074757	Church of All Saints More images
Kirby Muxloe Castle	Kirby Muxloe, Blaby	Castle	Begun 1480	23 February 1987	SK5237904619; 52°38′12″N 1°13′39″W	1177213	Kirby Muxloe Castle More images
Church of St Peter	Whetstone, Blaby	Parish Church	13th century	12 May 1997	SP5576797526; 52°34′22″N 1°10′43″W	1245457	Church of St Peter More images

== Charnwood ==
Name	Location	Type	Completed	Date designated	Grid ref. Geo-coordinates	Entry number	Image
Church of St Mary	Barkby, Charnwood	Parish Church	Late 13th century	1 June 1966	SK6367409856; 52°40′58″N 1°03′34″W	1074500	Church of St Mary More images
Prestwold Hall	Prestwold, Charnwood	Country House	Mid 18th century	9 July 1951	SK5791921470; 52°47′16″N 1°08′33″W	1074562	Prestwold Hall More images
Church of St Mary	Queniborough, Charnwood	Parish Church	Late Saxon or early Norman	1 June 1966	SK6508012068; 52°42′09″N 1°02′18″W	1074484	Church of St Mary More images
Church of St Bartholomew and Farnham Chapel	Quorn, Charnwood	Church	C12-C14	1 June 1966	SK5611716589; 52°44′38″N 1°10′13″W	1278876	Church of St Bartholomew and Farnham Chapel More images
Rothley Court Hotel and the Chapel	Rothley, Charnwood	Country House	Dissolution of the Monasteries	9 July 1951	SK5767912300; 52°42′19″N 1°08′52″W	1278606	Rothley Court Hotel and the Chapel More images
Church of St Botolph	Shepshed, Charnwood	Parish Church	13th century	18 January 1950	SK4810419693; 52°46′22″N 1°17′18″W	1236177	Church of St Botolph More images
Mountsorrel Cross c250 Metres South East of Church	Swithland, Charnwood	Cross	Medieval	1 June 1966	SK5565612606; 52°42′30″N 1°10′40″W	1177957	Mountsorrel Cross c250 Metres South East of Church More images
Church of Saints Peter and Paul	Syston, Charnwood	Parish Church	13th century	1 June 1966	SK6262411859; 52°42′03″N 1°04′29″W	1074467	Church of Saints Peter and Paul More images
Ulverscroft Priory Ruins and Priory Farmhouse and Outbuildings	Ulverscroft, Charnwood	Farmhouse	18th century	1 June 1966	SK5012312710; 52°42′35″N 1°15′34″W	1295073	Ulverscroft Priory Ruins and Priory Farmhouse and Outbuildings More images
Church of St Mary	Wymeswold, Charnwood	Parish Church	Medieval	1 June 1966	SK6031723473; 52°48′20″N 1°06′24″W	1074543	Church of St Mary More images
Church of All Saints	Loughborough, Charnwood	Church	14th century	15 March 1965	SK5381019942; 52°46′28″N 1°12′14″W	1320400	Church of All Saints More images
Garendon Park, the Triumphal Arch	Loughborough, Charnwood	Triumphal Arch	1730s	15 March 1965	SK4949919075; 52°46′01″N 1°16′04″W	1361136	Upload Photo

== City of Leicester ==
Name	Location	Type	Completed	Date designated	Grid ref. Geo-coordinates	Entry number	Image
Leicester Abbey Ruins	Abbey Park, City of Leicester	Abbey	Founded 1143	5 January 1950	SK5846806007; 52°38′55″N 1°08′14″W	1074051	Leicester Abbey Ruins More images
Abbot Penny's Wall	City of Leicester	Walls, turrets and gates	c1500	14 March 1975	SK5851306115; 52°38′59″N 1°08′12″W	1361406	Abbot Penny's Wall More images
Assembly Rooms Basement Area Railings to Assembly Rooms (county Rooms)	City of Leicester	Assembly Rooms	1792	5 January 1950	SK5869904350; 52°38′01″N 1°08′03″W	1184114	Assembly Rooms Basement Area Railings to Assembly Rooms (county Rooms) More images
Church of St Margaret	City of Leicester	Church	Anglo Saxon	5 January 1950	SK5854205087; 52°38′25″N 1°08′11″W	1074072	Church of St Margaret More images
Church of St Mary de Castro, Leicester	City of Leicester	Church	Early 13th century	5 January 1950	SK5828504188; 52°37′56″N 1°08′25″W	1074070	Church of St Mary de Castro, Leicester More images
Church of St Nicholas	City of Leicester	Church	c880 AD	5 January 1950	SK5823804501; 52°38′07″N 1°08′27″W	1361046	Church of St Nicholas More images
County Court (including Remains of Leicester Castle)	City of Leicester	Castle	11th century or 12th century	5 January 1950	SK5822204190; 52°37′56″N 1°08′28″W	1200622	County Court (including Remains of Leicester Castle) More images
Former Church of All Saints	City of Leicester	Parish Church	12th century	5 January 1950	SK5827404840; 52°38′17″N 1°08′25″W	1074012	Former Church of All Saints More images
Guildhall	City of Leicester	Courtyard	Founded 1347	5 January 1950	SK5844404453; 52°38′05″N 1°08′16″W	1361405	Guildhall More images
Jewry Wall	City of Leicester	Wall	Roman	5 January 1950	SK5822404489; 52°38′06″N 1°08′28″W	1074773	Jewry Wall More images
Magazine Gateway Regimental Museum	City of Leicester	Castle	Medieval	5 January 1950	SK5844604120; 52°37′54″N 1°08′16″W	1184902	Magazine Gateway Regimental Museum More images
Remains of Cavendish House	City of Leicester	House	c. 1600	5 January 1950	SK5840806078; 52°38′57″N 1°08′17″W	1074052	Remains of Cavendish House More images
Turret Gateway	City of Leicester	Castle	circa 1422-3	5 January 1950	SK5831204122; 52°37′54″N 1°08′24″W	1074069	Turret Gateway More images
War Memorial	Victoria Park, Leicester	Arch	1925	23 February 1955	SK5956503212; 52°37′24″N 1°07′17″W	1074786	War Memorial More images

== Harborough ==
Name	Location	Type	Completed	Date designated	Grid ref. Geo-coordinates	Entry number	Image
Church of St Peter	Claybrooke Parva, Harborough	Parish Church	12th century	11 January 1955	SP4961487913; 52°29′13″N 1°16′15″W	1209153	Church of St Peter More images
Church of St Peter and St Paul	Great Bowden, Harborough	Parish Church	C13-14	25 July 1952	SP7463688876; 52°29′34″N 0°54′08″W	1061277	Church of St Peter and St Paul More images
Church of St Michael and All Angels	Hallaton, Harborough	Church	C12-C13	7 December 1966	SP7865596531; 52°33′39″N 0°50′28″W	1360624	Church of St Michael and All Angels More images
Quenby Hall	Hungarton, Harborough	Country House	c1615-1630	19 October 1951	SK7018606393; 52°39′03″N 0°57′50″W	1295060	Quenby Hall More images
Old House and Garden Walls	Kibworth Harcourt, Harborough	House	1678	7 December 1966	SP6820994550; 52°32′40″N 0°59′44″W	1188029	Old House and Garden Walls More images
Church of St John the Baptist	King's Norton, Harborough	Church	1757-1775	29 December 1966	SK6890500494; 52°35′52″N 0°59′03″W	1360627	Church of St John the Baptist More images
Fortrey Tomb at Churchyard of St John the Baptist	King's Norton, Harborough	Obelisk	Mid 18th century	21 December 1984	SK6892000488; 52°35′52″N 0°59′02″W	1360628	Fortrey Tomb at Churchyard of St John the Baptist
Church of All Saints	Lubenham, Harborough	Parish Church	Late 12th century	7 December 1966	SP7052487072; 52°28′37″N 0°57′47″W	1061473	Church of All Saints More images
Church of St Mary	Lutterworth, Harborough	Church	19th century	11 January 1955	SP5424584453; 52°27′19″N 1°12′11″W	1211040	Church of St Mary More images
Church of St Mary	Nevill Holt, Harborough	Church	C13-C15	7 December 1966	SP8164393692; 52°32′06″N 0°47′52″W	1188359	Church of St Mary More images
Nevill Holt Hall Preparatory School	Nevill Holt, Harborough	Country House	C16-C18	21 July 1951	SP8162193677; 52°32′05″N 0°47′53″W	1188367	Nevill Holt Hall Preparatory School More images
Noseley Chapel	Noseley, Harborough	Chapel	c. 1220	29 December 1966	SP7376298492; 52°34′45″N 0°54′46″W	1360652	Noseley Chapel More images
Church of St Andrew	Owston, Harborough	Church	c1161	29 December 1966	SK7744607964; 52°39′50″N 0°51′23″W	1074871	Church of St Andrew More images
Church of All Saints	Peatling Magna, Harborough	Parish Church	13th century	11 January 1955	SP5948292462; 52°31′36″N 1°07′29″W	1061529	Church of All Saints More images
Church of All Saints	Scraptoft, Harborough	Church	C13-C15	29 December 1966	SK6476105577; 52°38′39″N 1°02′40″W	1188364	Church of All Saints More images
Church of St Peter	Stockerston, Harborough	Church	C13-C15	7 December 1966	SP8337897500; 52°34′08″N 0°46′17″W	1360696	Church of St Peter More images
Church of All Saints	Theddingworth, Harborough	Parish Church	12th century	7 December 1966	SP6678085739; 52°27′56″N 1°01′06″W	1188196	Church of All Saints More images
Church of St Peter	Tilton on the Hill, Harborough	Parish Church	12th century TO 15th century	29 December 1966	SK7434405655; 52°38′37″N 0°54′10″W	1074839	Church of St Peter More images
Stanford Hall	Westrill and Starmore, Harborough	Country House	1697	11 January 1955	SP5874079309; 52°24′31″N 1°08′17″W	1188550	Stanford Hall More images
Withcote Chapel	Withcote, Harborough	Chapel	15th century	29 December 1966	SK7957705793; 52°38′39″N 0°49′31″W	1074845	Withcote Chapel More images
Church of St Dionysius	Market Harborough	Church	Early 14th century	25 June 1952	SP7335587285; 52°28′43″N 0°55′17″W	1074439	Church of St Dionysius More images
Old Grammar School	Market Harborough	Market Hall	1614	25 July 1952	SP7336587259; 52°28′42″N 0°55′16″W	1361201	Old Grammar School More images

== Hinckley and Bosworth ==
Name	Location	Type	Completed	Date designated	Grid ref. Geo-coordinates	Entry number	Image
Church of St Peter	Thornton, Bagworth & Thornton, Hinckley and Bosworth	Parish Church	C13-C16	7 November 1966	SK4683107667; 52°39′53″N 1°18′32″W	1074115	Church of St Peter More images
Church of St Mary	Barwell, Hinckley and Bosworth	Parish Church	c. 1300–1500	8 March 1963	SP4438096502; 52°33′52″N 1°20′48″W	1074229	Church of St Mary More images
Newbold Verdon Hall	Newbold Verdon, Hinckley and Bosworth	Country House	c. 1700	22 October 1952	SK4421703817; 52°37′49″N 1°20′53″W	1074089	Upload Photo
Church of St Mary Magdelene	Peckleton, Hinckley and Bosworth	Parish Church	Early/mid-14th century	7 November 1966	SK4701900837; 52°36′12″N 1°18′26″W	1074235	Church of St Mary Magdelene More images
Church of St Margaret	Stoke Golding, Hinckley and Bosworth	Parish Church	Early 13th century	8 March 1963	SP3977697265; 52°34′18″N 1°24′52″W	1074214	Church of St Margaret More images
Church of St Edith	Orton on the Hill, Twycross, Hinckley and Bosworth	Parish Church	Early 14th century, with later alterations and additions	7 November 1966	SK3042303931; 52°37′56″N 1°33′07″W	1188352	Church of St Edith More images
Church of St James	Twycross, Hinckley and Bosworth	Parish Church	Early 14th century	7 November 1966	SK3387104906; 52°38′27″N 1°30′03″W	1074217	Church of St James More images
Church of St Peter	Witherley, Hinckley and Bosworth	Parish Church	Early 14th century	7 November 1966	SP3251697339; 52°34′22″N 1°31′18″W	1188486	Church of St Peter More images

== Melton ==
Name	Location	Type	Completed	Date designated	Grid ref. Geo-coordinates	Entry number	Image
Church of All Saints	Asfordby, Melton	Parish Church	14th century	1 January 1968	SK7081218939; 52°45′48″N 0°57′07″W	1360866	Church of All Saints More images
Belvoir Castle	Belvoir, Melton	Castle	Norman	14 July 1953	SK8200133719; 52°53′41″N 0°46′57″W	1360870	Belvoir Castle More images
Church of St Mary	Bottesford, Melton	Parish Church	13th century	1 January 1968	SK8073339126; 52°56′36″N 0°48′00″W	1075095	Church of St Mary More images
Church of St John the Baptist	Buckminster, Melton	Parish Church	13th century	1 January 1968	SK8790723078; 52°47′53″N 0°41′51″W	1061281	Church of St John the Baptist More images
Church of St James	Burton Lazars, Burton and Dalby, Melton	Parish Church	Late 12th century	1 January 1968	SK7676316941; 52°44′41″N 0°51′52″W	1360836	Church of St James More images
Church of St Denys	Eaton, Melton	Parish Church	13th century	1 January 1968	SK7982029079; 52°51′12″N 0°48′58″W	1075022	Church of St Denys More images
Church of St Denys	Goadby Marwood, Eaton, Melton	Parish Church	13th century	1 January 1968	SK7793226379; 52°49′46″N 0°50′41″W	1360902	Church of St Denys More images
Church of St Mary	Freeby, Melton	Parish Church	Early 14th century	1 January 1968	SK8038420122; 52°46′22″N 0°48′36″W	1360855	Church of St Mary More images
Church of St Mary Magdalene	Stapleford Park, Freeby, Melton	Church	1699	1 January 1968	SK8117218203; 52°45′19″N 0°47′55″W	1176947	Church of St Mary Magdalene More images
Stapleford Hall with Adjoining Service Wings and Orangery	Stapleford Park, Freeby, Melton	House	1986	4 July 1953	SK8137518060; 52°45′15″N 0°47′45″W	1360859	Stapleford Hall with Adjoining Service Wings and Orangery More images
Church of St Thomas of Canterbury	Frisby on the Wreake, Melton	Parish Church	12th century	1 January 1968	SK6958117801; 52°45′12″N 0°58′14″W	1360878	Church of St Thomas of Canterbury More images
Church of St Luke	Gaddesby, Melton	Parish Church	12th century	1 January 1968	SK6897513051; 52°42′39″N 0°58′50″W	1307542	Church of St Luke More images
Church of St Mary	Ashby Folville, Gaddesby, Melton	Parish Church	Late 13th century	1 January 1968	SK7067811988; 52°42′03″N 0°57′20″W	1061267	Church of St Mary More images
Church of St Andrew	Coston, Garthorpe, Melton	Parish Church	11th century	1 January 1968	SK8480322186; 52°47′26″N 0°44′38″W	1061273	Church of St Andrew More images
Church of St Mary	Garthorpe, Melton	Parish Church	Early 13th century	1 January 1968	SK8316020931; 52°46′46″N 0°46′07″W	1307476	Church of St Mary More images
Church of All Saints	Hoby, Hoby with Rotherby, Melton	Church	13th century	1 January 1968	SK6691617348; 52°44′59″N 1°00′36″W	1075004	Church of All Saints More images
Church of St Peter	Kirby Bellars, Melton	Parish Church	13th century	1 January 1968	SK7178918239; 52°45′25″N 0°56′16″W	1261717	Church of St Peter More images
Church of St John the Baptist	Cold Overton, Knossington and Cold Overton, Melton	Parish Church	13th century	1 January 1968	SK8102410152; 52°40′59″N 0°48′10″W	1075150	Church of St John the Baptist More images
Cold Overton Hall and adjoining Garden Walls	Cold Overton, Knossington and Cold Overton, Melton	Country House	c. 1664	14 July 1953	SK8098810088; 52°40′57″N 0°48′12″W	1075147	Cold Overton Hall and adjoining Garden Walls More images
Church of All Saints	Somerby, Melton	Parish Church	12th century	1 January 1968	SK7794710492; 52°41′11″N 0°50′54″W	1177777	Church of All Saints More images
Church of All Saints	Pickwell, Somerby, Melton	Parish Church	13th century	1 January 1968	SK7857211379; 52°41′40″N 0°50′20″W	1360851	Church of All Saints More images
Church of St Andrew	Twyford, Twyford and Thorpe, Melton	Parish Church	12th century	1 January 1968	SK7299210094; 52°41′01″N 0°55′18″W	1307264	Church of St Andrew More images
Church of St Mary Magdalene	Waltham on the Wolds and Thorpe Arnold, Melton	Parish Church	Norman	1 January 1968	SK8025425049; 52°49′01″N 0°48′38″W	1188847	Church of St Mary Magdalene More images
Church of St Michael	Edmondthorpe, Wymondham, Melton	Parish Church	13th century	1 January 1968	SK8581417556; 52°44′56″N 0°43′48″W	1075128	Church of St Michael More images
Church of St Peter	Wymondham, Melton	Parish Church	13th century	1 January 1968	SK8515718653; 52°45′32″N 0°44′22″W	1177844	Church of St Peter More images
Parish Church of St Mary	Melton Mowbray	Parish Church	Norman	24 October 1950	SK7527619030; 52°45′49″N 0°53′09″W	1235286	Parish Church of St Mary More images

== North West Leicestershire ==
Name	Location	Type	Completed	Date designated	Grid ref. Geo-coordinates	Entry number	Image
The Sir John Moore Church of England Primary School	Appleby Magna, North West Leicestershire	Wall	1697	16 December 1952	SK3137209146; 52°40′45″N 1°32′15″W	1177850	The Sir John Moore Church of England Primary School More images
Castle Ruins (including 2 Isolated Towers at South East and South West Angles of Outer Wall)	Ashby-de-la-Zouch, North West Leicestershire	Castle	Late 15th century	8 May 1950	SK3612716674; 52°44′47″N 1°27′59″W	1073591	Castle Ruins (including 2 Isolated Towers at South East and South West Angles of Outer Wall) More images
Parish Church of St Helen	Ashby-de-la-Zouch, North West Leicestershire	Parish Church	14th-century origins	8 May 1950	SK3608816767; 52°44′50″N 1°28′01″W	1188344	Parish Church of St Helen More images
Church of St Mary and St Hardulph	Breedon on the Hill, North West Leicestershire	Cross	C9 or 10th century	7 December 1962	SK4057723348; 52°48′22″N 1°23′58″W	1361364	Church of St Mary and St Hardulph More images
Church of St Nicholas	Lockington, Lockington-Hemington, North West Leicestershire	Parish Church	c. 1200	7 December 1962	SK4680127931; 52°50′49″N 1°18′24″W	1074178	Church of St Nicholas More images
Staunton Harold Church / Chapel of the Holy Trinity	Staunton Harold, North West Leicestershire	Chapel	1653-1665	24 November 1965	SK3799120873; 52°47′03″N 1°26′17″W	1074386	Staunton Harold Church / Chapel of the Holy Trinity More images
Staunton Harold Hall	Staunton Harold, North West Leicestershire	Country House	c. 1700	1 March 1950	SK3794220908; 52°47′04″N 1°26′20″W	1177552	Staunton Harold Hall More images

== Oadby and Wigston ==
Name	Location	Type	Completed	Date designated	Grid ref. Geo-coordinates	Entry number	Image
Church of All Saints	Moat Street, Wigston, Oadby and Wigston	Parish Church	Early 14th century	1 October 1953	SP6040998648; 52°34′56″N 1°06′36″W	1177393	Church of All Saints More images

== See also ==
- Grade II* listed buildings in Leicestershire
