= St Botolph's Church =

St Botolph's Church may refer to numerous churches in England, usually dedicated to Botolph of Thorney, including:

Leicestershire

- St Botolph's Church, Ratcliffe on the Wreake
- St Botolph's Church, Shepshed

Lincolnshire

- St Botolph's Church, Boston
- St Botolph's Church, Lincoln, now Church of St Basil and St Paisios
- St Botolph's Church, Quarrington
- St Botolph's Church, Saxilby
- St Botolph's Church, Skidbrooke

London

- St Botolph's, Aldersgate
- St Botolph's Aldgate
- St Botolph Billingsgate
- St Botolph-without-Bishopsgate
- St Botolph's Church, Ruxley, London Borough of Bromley

Northamptonshire

- St Botolph's Church, Slapton
- St Botolph's Church, Barton Seagrave

North Yorkshire

- St Botolph's Church, Bossall
- St Botolph's Church, Carlton in Cleveland
- St Botolph's Church, Horsehouse

Suffolk

- St Botolph's Church in Iken
- St Botolph's Church in North Cove

West Sussex

- St Botolph's Church, Botolphs
- St Botolph's Church, Hardham
- St Botolph's Church, Heene

Other

- St Botolph's Church in Aspley Guise, Bedfordshire
- St Botolph's Church, Cambridge, Cambridgeshire
- St Botolph's Church, Knottingley, West Yorkshire
- St Botolph's Church, Lullingstone, Kent
- St Botolph's Church, Newbold-on-Avon, Warwickshire
- St Botolph's Church in Trunch, Norfolk
- St Botolph's Church, Wardley, Rutland
- St Botolph's Church, Limpenhoe, Norfolk

== See also ==
- St. Botolph's Priory, Colchester, Essex
- Budolfi Church, Aalborg, Jutland, Denmark
