= Lucarne =

In architecture, a dormer window

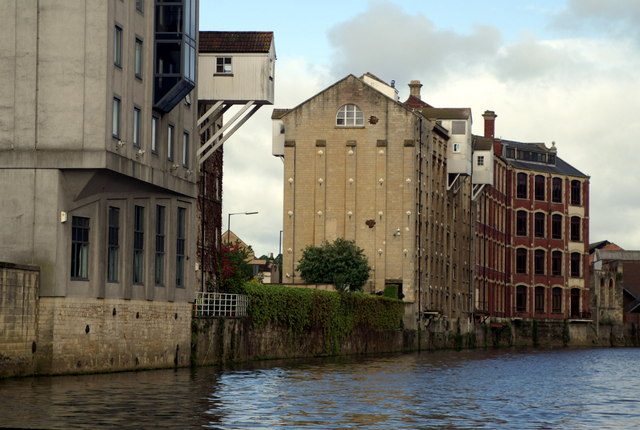
Camden Malthouse (left) and Camden Mill (1880) beyond, Bath

In architecture, a lucarne is a dormer window in a spire or industrial building.

== Use in spires ==
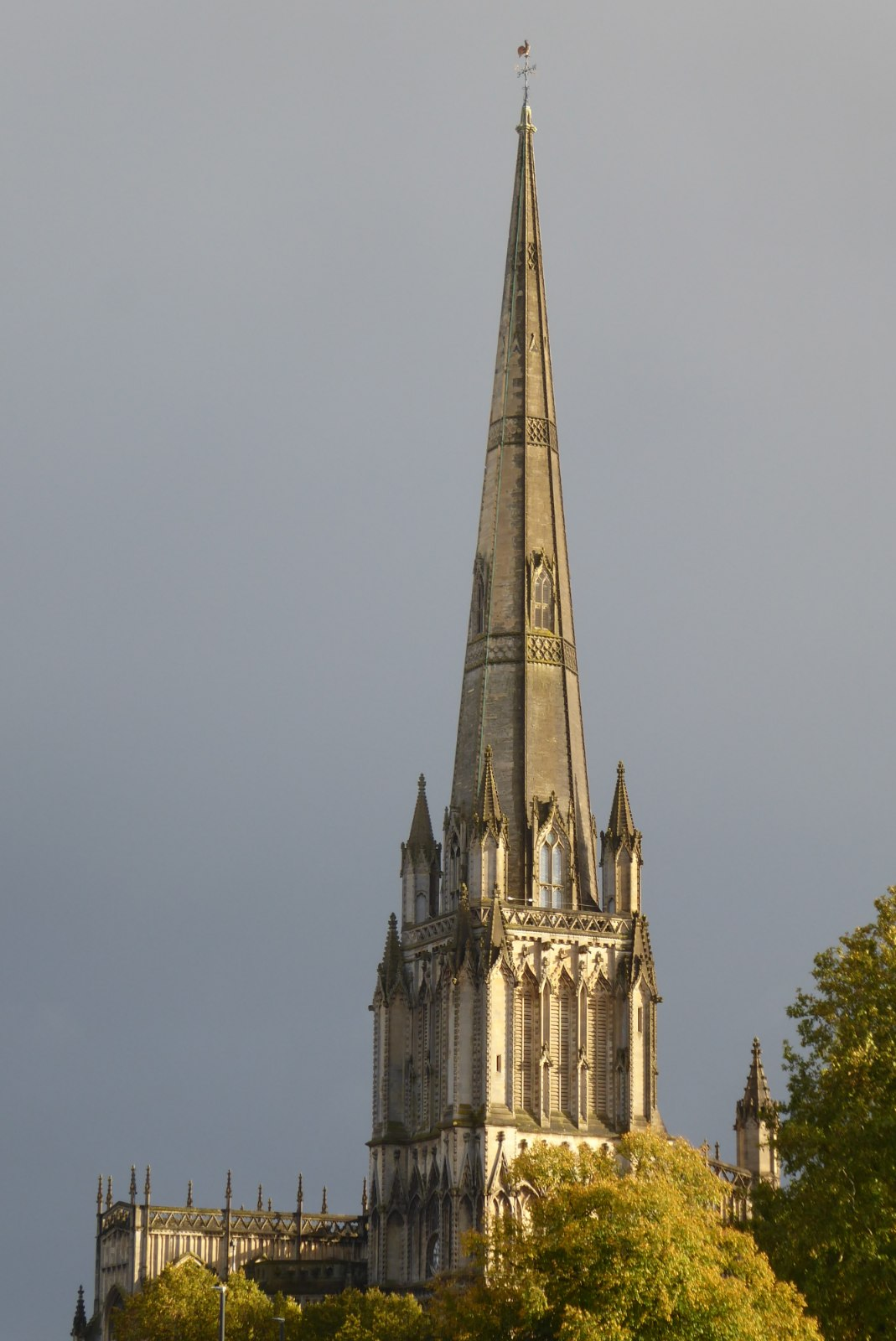
The spire of St Mary Redcliffe, Bristol, has three tiers of lucarnes.

The term, "lucarne", is borrowed from French: lucarne, which refers to a dormer window, usually one set into the middle of a roof although it can also apply to a façade lucarne, where the gable of the lucarne is aligned with the face of the wall. This general meaning is preserved in British use, particularly for small windows into unoccupied attic or spire spaces. Nikolaus Pevsner described it as "a small gabled opening in a roof or a spire". The Encyclopædia Britannica says that, "A small dormer in a roof or a spire is called a lucarne". A lucarne can also be referred to as a "spire-light".

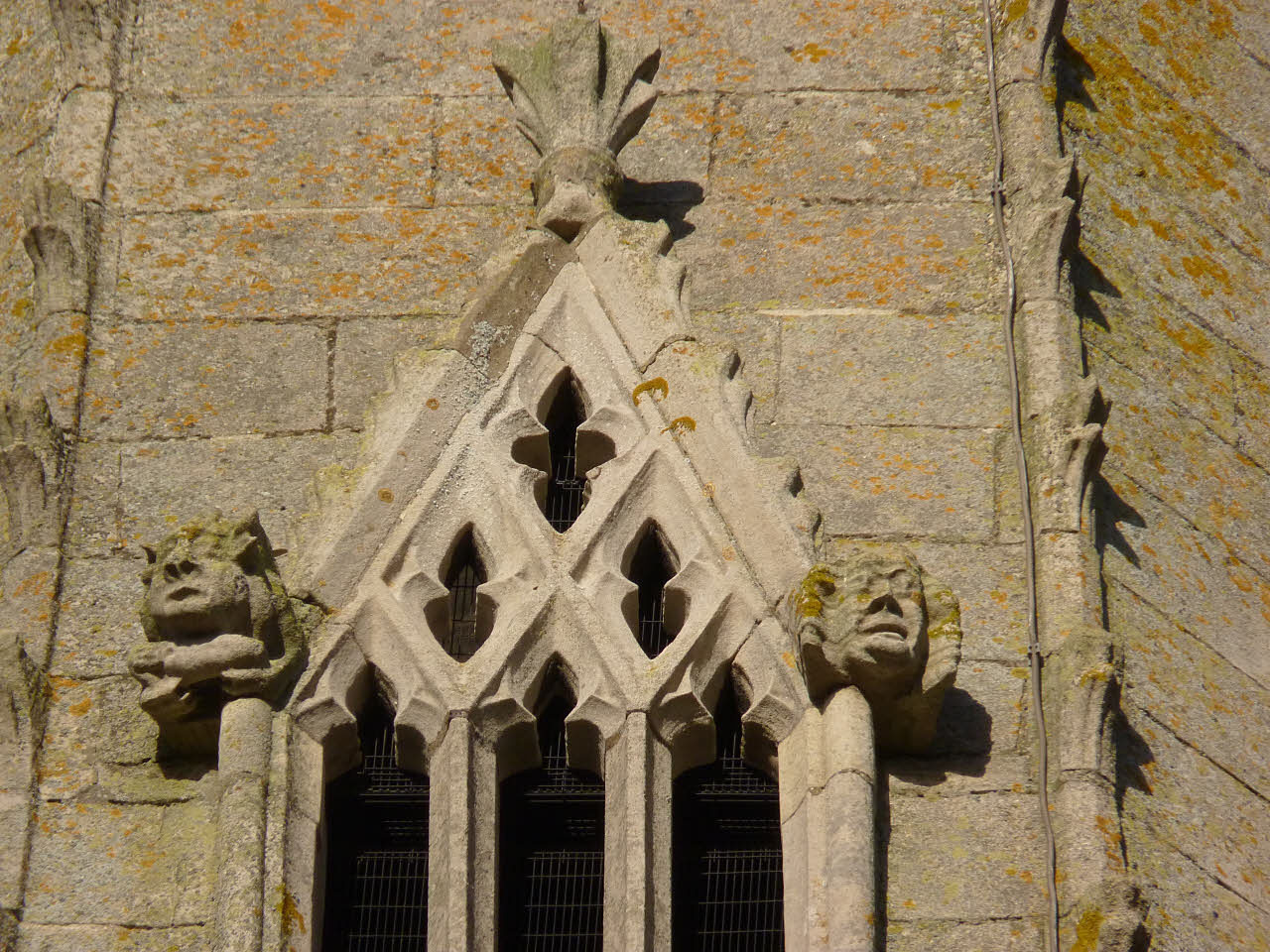
Detail of a lucarne on the spire of St Mary's Church, Queniborough, Leicestershire

Lucarnes were particularly common in English Gothic architecture, as many churches had solid stone spires, unlike the openwork ones seen in Germany. Early lucarnes often imitated the tracery of full-size windows in the main body of the church, but by the Perpendicular period, they tended to use a form of simplified, diamond-shaped tracery (right) quite unlike that of other windows.

== Industrial usage ==
In industrial architecture a lucarne or lucam is a feature of warehouses, mills, factories or the like in which a window, opening or housing high up on an exterior wall supports a hoist above doors on the floors below.

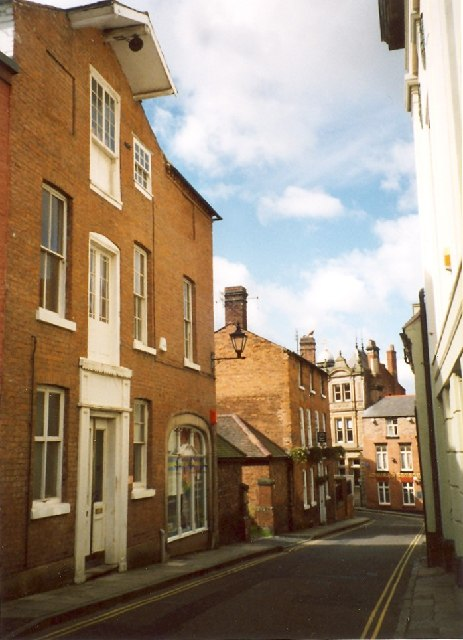
College Hill, Shrewsbury

The simplest lucarne is no more than the extension of a roof beyond a gable wall, with a ridge timber strong enough to support a hoist. A gin wheel on this beam can provide a simple rope hoist, sufficient to lift a sack of grain. Any greater weights than this are likely to need either a pulley block with multiple advantage, or a geared chain hoist.

Some lucarnes are enclosed, and are often wooden-clad structures cantilevered out from the wall. For strength though, the hoist is often carried by a steel girder or reinforced concrete structure. These enclosed lucarnes may act as a loading dock for that floor, with a trapdoor beneath, or they may be simply weather housings for a hoist serving the floors beneath. They are commonly a small housing high in the eaves, above the main working floors.

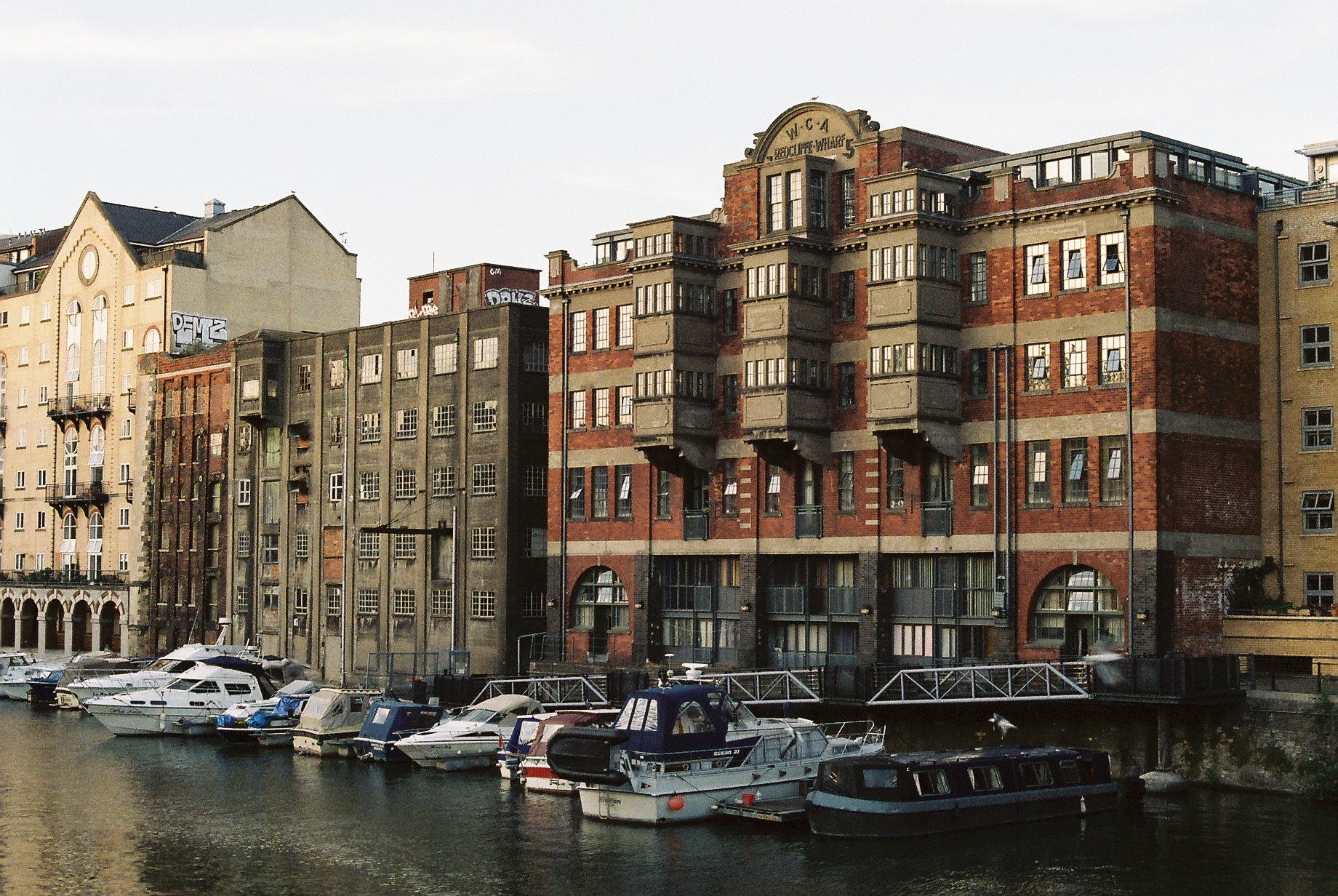
The WCA warehouse on Redcliffe Wharf in Bristol (Note: Western Counties Agricultural Co-operative (WCA) warehouse on Redcliffe Back, Bristol. Built in 1909–1912 of a reinforced concrete Hennebique frame with red brick facing to a design by W A Brown of Leeds. After the closure of the Docks it was Grade II listed in 1977 but then lay derelict until conversion to 39 flats in 1997.)

Mills may only require loading to a single floor, but warehouses will require access from each floor. Each hoist accesses all of the floors beneath it, through their prominent doors. These doors often provide a modern indication of an old warehouse building's original purpose. These doors sometimes have an iron fold-down flap outside them, as a short loading step, giving clearance for the hoist away from the wall.

Some large examples are multi-storey.

Where multiple vehicles could be alongside a building at once, there could be multiple closely spaced lucarnes in use simultaneously.

=== Repurposed buildings ===
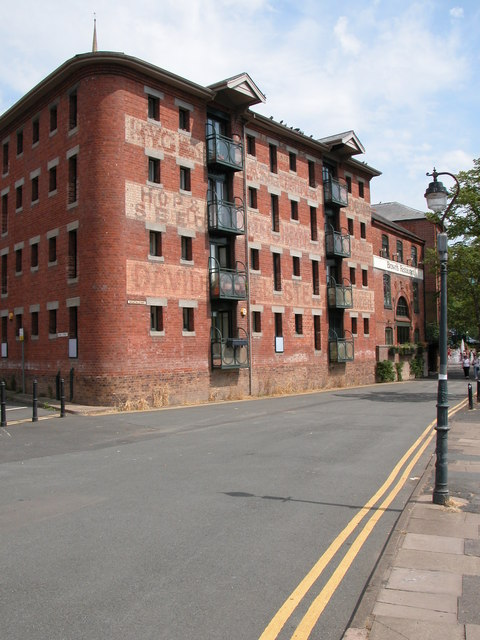
Warehouse in Worcester converted to flats, 2006

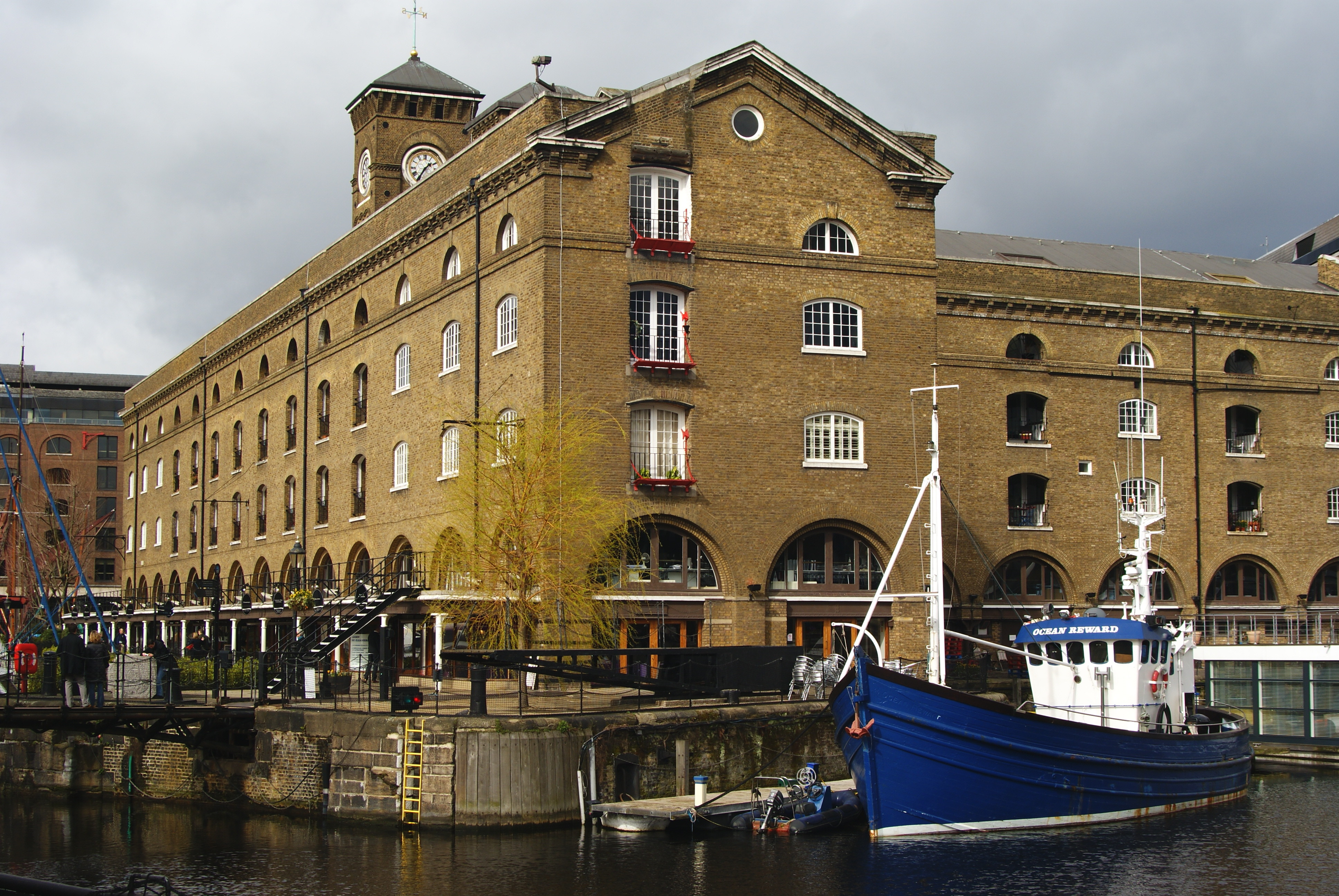
Ivory House, St Katharine Docks, London (1830). Note the traces of the removed lucarne above the loading doorways, and the resulting gap in the parapet.

Many surviving warehouses are now converted as multiple flats. The large loading doorways on each floor are often converted with large windows and sometimes a balcony. The lucarne is now superfluous and may be either preserved as a decorative feature, or (often for wooden examples in poor condition) removed. Some remain in a vestigial form, where they still complete a roof, but the structure below is gone.
