= John Frewen-Turner =

English landowner and politician

John Frewen-Turner (1 August 1755 – 1 February 1829), born John Frewen, was an English landowner and politician.

== Life ==
John Frewen was born in Sapcote, Leicestershire, the son of the Revd. Thomas Frewen and Esther (née Simpkin). In 1777 Thomas Frewen received the bequest of Cold Overton Hall in Leicestershire from the Turner family, on the condition that he should adopt the surname and arms of the Turners, which he accordingly did, uniting it to Frewen in a double barrel.

John was educated at Rugby School and Queen's College, Oxford, where he graduated BA in 1778. In 1779 he was admitted to the Middle Temple.

He inherited Cold Overton Hall at his father's death in 1791, and adopted the name and arms of Turner at that time for the same purpose. In that year he served as High Sheriff of Leicestershire. He became Lieutenant-Colonel of Leicestershire Yeomanry in 1797, and MP for the Irish seat of Athlone, Westmeath from 1807 to 1812.

He married in 1808 Eleanor Clark, sister of the writer and Parisian salon hostess Mary Mohl and daughter of Charles Clark of Westminster. Mary frequently stayed with the Frewen-Turners at their home in Cold Overton. Their children included the future politicians Charles Frewen and Thomas Frewen Turner.

He died at Coventry in 1829. His funerary monument in the church at Cold Overton is by William Grinsell Nicholl.

Parliament of the United Kingdom
Preceded by Henry Wellesley	Member of Parliament for Athlone; 1807–1812	Succeeded by John Wilson Croker
