= St Mary's Church, Garthorpe =

Coordinates: 52.7796°N 0.7686°W

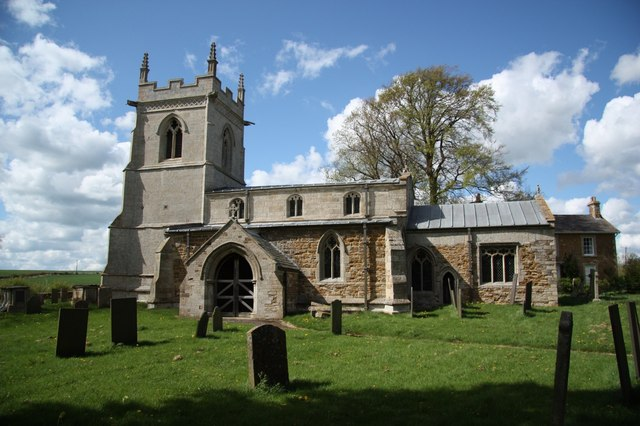
- St Mary's Church seen from the south

- Location in Leicestershire
- OS grid reference: SK831209
- Location: Garthorpe, Leicestershire
- Country: England
- Denomination: Church of England
- Website: St Mary's Church, Garthorpe, Leicestershire

History
- Dedication: Saint Mary

Architecture
- Functional status: Redundant
- Heritage designation: Grade I
- Designated: 1 January 1968
- Architect: J Day (restoration)
- Architectural type: Church
- Style: Norman, Gothic
- Groundbreaking: early 13th century
- Completed: 15th century

Specifications
- Materials: Body ironstone, Clerestory and tower limestone, Roofs lead

Administration
- Province: Canterbury
- Diocese: Leicester
- Parish: Wymondham, Edmondthorpe and Garthorpe

St Mary's Church is a redundant Church of England parish church in the village of Garthorpe, Leicestershire, England. The building is Grade I listed. It has been in the care of the Churches Conservation Trust since 1 November 1999.

== History ==
The oldest fabric in the church is early 13th-century the Norman south arcade. The north arcade is slightly later. The aisles and chancel were altered in the 14th century. In the 15th century the clerestory and west tower were added. The church was restored by J Day of Leicester in 1895–96.

In recent years it has been noted that the north wall of the north aisle is leaning outwards and that cracks are present in that wall and elsewhere in the church. These are being monitored, and in 2009 the Churches Conservation Trust decided to underpin the wall of the north aisle.

== Architecture ==
=== Exterior ===
The body of the church is ironstone but the clerestory and west tower are limestone. The roofs are leaded. The plan comprises a nave with a clerestory, north and south aisles, a south porch, a chancel, and a west tower.

The tower has three stages and diagonal buttresses. In the lowest stage is a double lancet window on the west side, the middle stage has two quatrefoil windows on the south, and in the top stage are double lancet bell openings with ogee heads on each side. Around the top of the tower is a frieze decorated with lozenges, four gargoyles, a crenellated parapet, and four corner pinnacles.

The clerestory is in three bays, and on its eastern gable is a cross. On its north face is one double lancet window, and on the south side there are three similar windows. The north aisle is in two unequal-sized bays. In its west wall is a double lancet window, on the north side is a double lancet window with Decorated tracery, and in the east wall is another lancet with similar tracery.

The chancel is in two bays, and has a cross on its east gable. The east window is a triple lancet. On the south side is a priest's door and a triple lancet window.

The south aisle is in three bays. In its east and west walls are triple lancet windows, and there is a double lancet on the south side. The south porch contains stone benches and has a gable with a cross.

=== Interior ===
The south arcade is Norman and the north is Transitional. The rest of the building is Gothic, with the clerestory and west tower being Perpendicular Gothic. Both arcades have three bays and round-headed arches. The piers of the south arcade are circular, but those of the slightly later north arcade are octagonal.

Windows in the north aisle contain roundels of 14th-century stained glass. At the east end of the south aisle are a 13th-century piscina and an aumbry. In the north wall of the chancel is a tomb recess over which is an aumbry under a crocketted ogee-headed canopy. In the south wall is another 13th-century piscina, and a seat in a window recess. The east window has 19th-century stained glass. The Perpendicular style reredos, the stalls and desks are all 19th-century Gothic Revival. The round font is 17th-century. The oak pulpit and an octagonal font were made by Rev W Thorold in 1899. Also in the church are 19th-century donation and Commandments boards, the Royal coat of arms of George III, and monuments including three brasses.

The west tower has a ring of three bells. Thomas II Newcombe of Leicester cast the treble bell in about 1580. Henry II Oldfield of Nottingham cast the tenor bell in 1600 and the second bell in 1608. The treble bell is damaged and the bells are unringable.

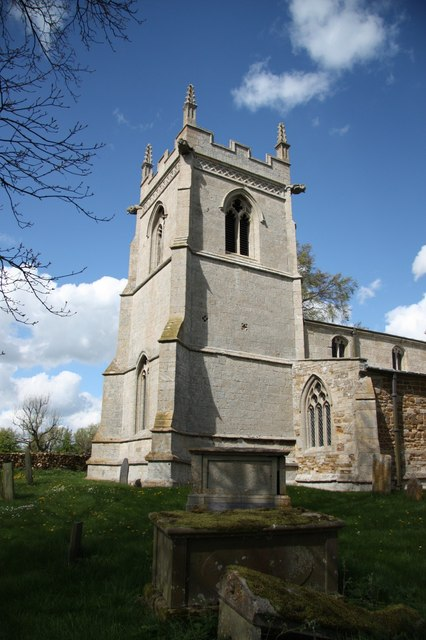
15th-century west tower, seen from the south

== Churchyard sundial ==
In the churchyard southeast of the church is a late 19th-century brass sundial mounted on a re-used 15th-century pinnacle. It is a Grade II listed structure.

== See also ==
- Grade I listed buildings in Leicestershire
- List of churches preserved by the Churches Conservation Trust in the English Midlands

== Sources ==
- Pevsner, Nikolaus; Williamson, Elizabeth; Brandwood, Geoffrey K (1984) [1960]. Leicestershire and Rutland. The Buildings of England. Harmondsworth: Penguin Books. pp. 160–161.
