= St Botolph's Church, Ratcliffe on the Wreake =

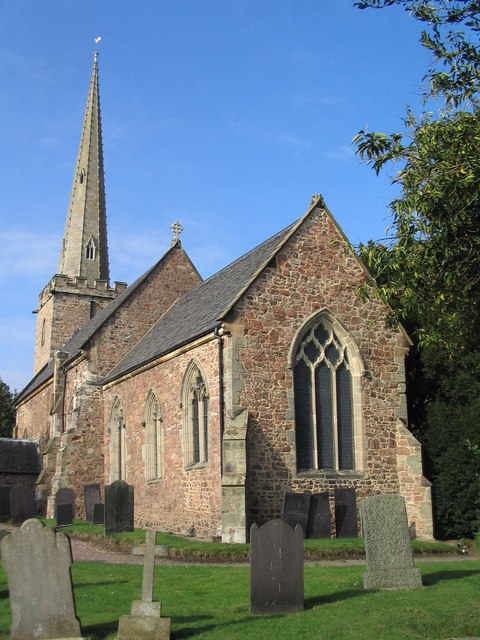
- St Botolph's Church, Ratcliffe on the Wreake
- 52°43′29.2367″N 1°4′4.592″W
- OS grid reference: SK 63046 14534
- Location: Ratcliffe on the Wreake
- Country: England
- Denomination: Church of England

History
- Dedication: St Botolph

Architecture
- Heritage designation: Grade II* listed

Administration
- Province: Canterbury
- Diocese: Diocese of Leicester
- Deanery: Goscote
- Parish: Ratcliffe on the Wreake

St Botolph's Church is a Grade II* listed Church of England church in the village of Ratcliffe on the Wreake, Leicestershire, England.

== Architecture ==
The church dates from the 14th century and was restored in 1876. Since then it hasn't undergone any major structural work / development and retains many original features.

=== Spire ===
The Spire dates from the 14th century, and was rebuilt in 1812. It is made from granite rubble stone, with Swithland slate roof tiles and has a north facing clock face.

=== Nave ===
The nave is the oldest part of the church, it dates from the early 14th century and was originally wider, with a North aisle. The North aisle was removed between 1791 and 1795, the four octagonal piers can still be seen internally. On the North wall, adjacent to the Chancel is a memorial to a Victorian schoolboy killed when he fell from his Pony, the memorial is in the form of an angel praying.

=== Chancel ===
The chancel itself dates from the 14th Century, however the roof is a newer addition, dating from the 19th Century. The Chancel is separated from the Nave by a double chamfered arch on polygonal responds, and is also two steps lower than the main body of the church.

=== Sanctuary ===
On the northern wall is a recess with a double chamfered arch and an effigy of a priest from the 14th Century.

=== Windows ===
The majority of the church windows are clear glass, with very little stained glass. Exceptions to this are:

- The West (tower) window dating from the 19th Century.
- The East window which contains a depiction of the Baptism of Christ, flanked by Saint John to his left, and Noah to his right. The window dates from 1878.
- There are three windows to the South of the Chancel all with Geometric tracery, the middle of these contains fragments of medieval glass.
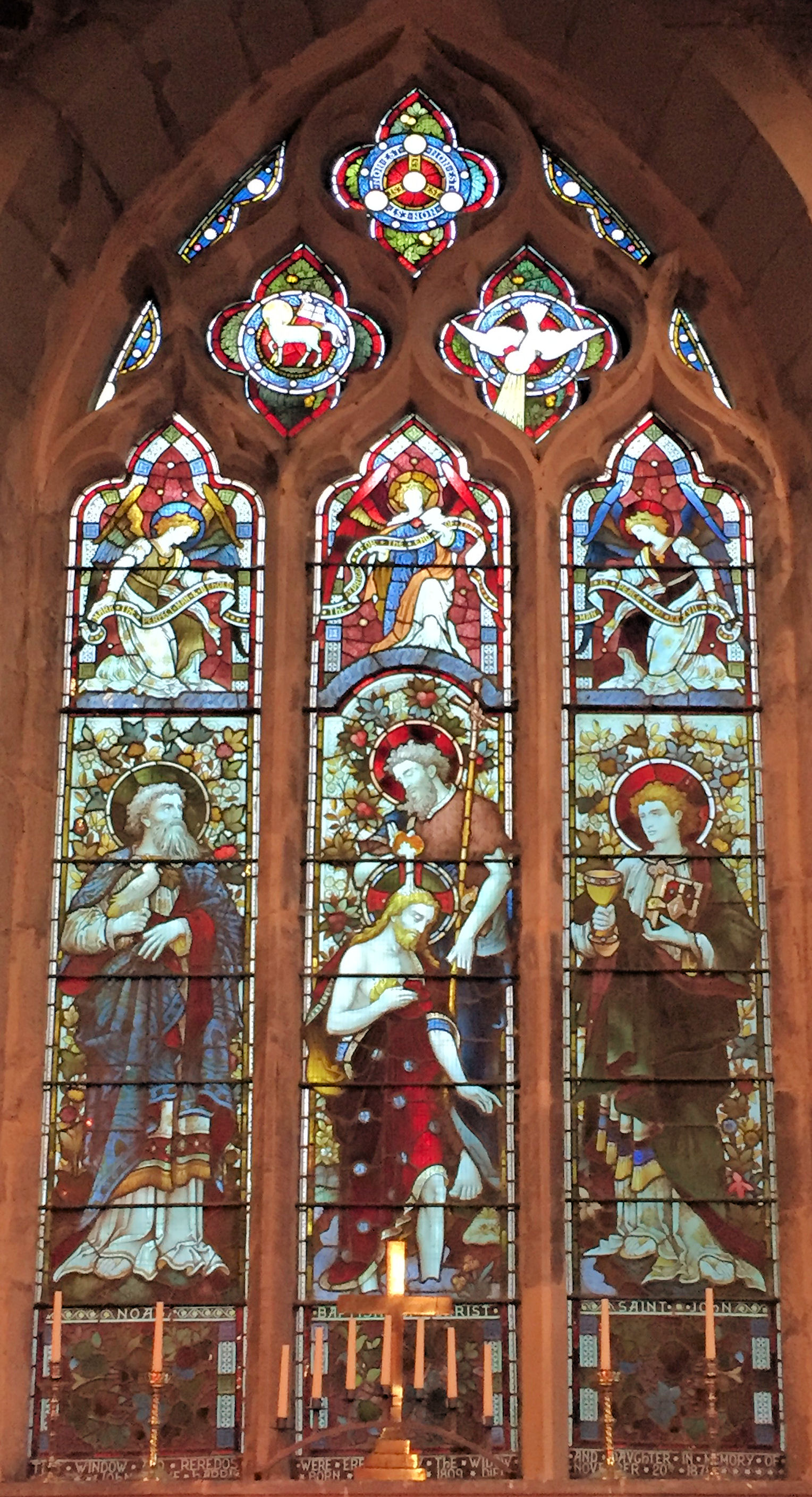
East window

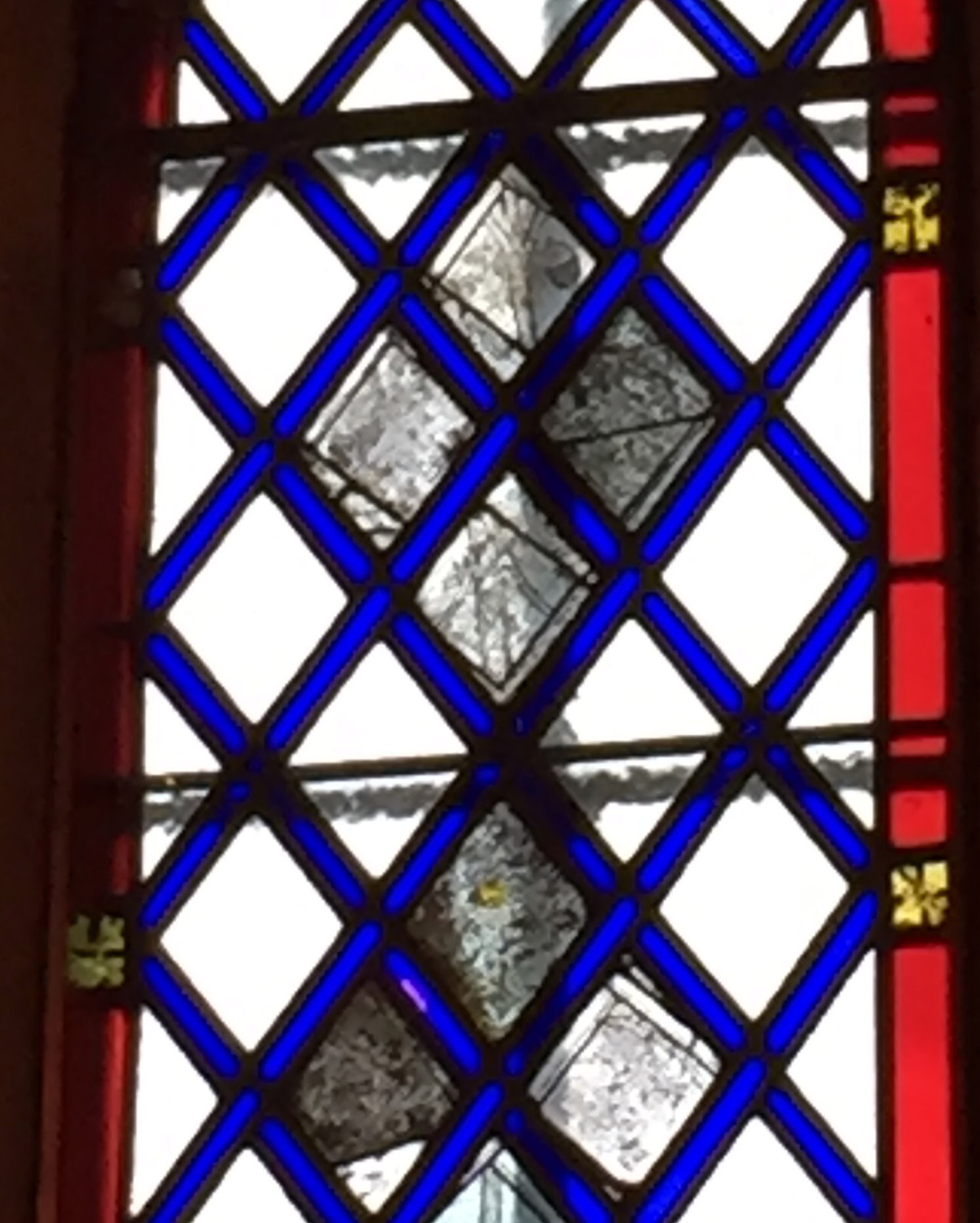
Medieval glass in the South Chancel window

== Furniture ==
The round font located to the West of the (main) South door dates from the 12th / 13th century and stands on an octagonal base, probably from the 19th Century. The remainder of the furniture is from 1869 and by RJ & J Goodacre.

== Ministry ==
St Botolph's is part of the Fosse Team in the Diocese of Leicester, it has services on three Sunday evenings per month. The other churches in the team are:

- St Mary's Church, Barkby
- St Hilda's Church, East Goscote
- St Mary's Church, Queniborough
- St Michael and All Angels' Church, Rearsby
- St Peter & St Paul, Syston
- Holy Trinity Church, Thrussington
- St Michael and All Angels' Church, Thurmaston

== Notable parishioners ==
- Richard Kilby (1560 - 1620) - Professor of Hebrew at Oxford University, credited with translating the later part of the Old Testament for the King James Version of the bible.
