= St Botolph's Church, Shepshed =

Church in Leicestershire, England

Coordinates: 52°46′21.50″N 1°17′18.00″W

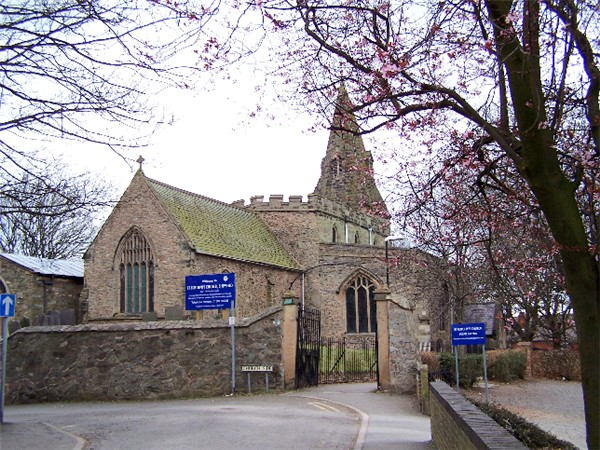
- St Botolph's Church, Shepshed
- Denomination: Church of England
- Churchmanship: Anglo Catholic

History
- Dedication: St. Botolph

Administration
- Province: Canterbury
- Diocese: Leicester
- Parish: Shepshed

St Botolph's Church, Shepshed is the Church of England Parish Church in Shepshed, Leicestershire.

== Background ==
It is the most westerly church dedicated to St Botolph and was founded in the 11th century. It is a Grade I listed building.

The church sits on top of the highest point in Shepshed, probably on the site of an ancient pre-Christian site of worship. The oldest surviving part of the church, the west tower and spire, dates from the 13th century. The nave, with clerestory and aisles, and chancel are all 15th-century. It is constructed mainly from Charnwood granite with Swithland slate roofing.

The south transept with vestry by Albert Herbert. The pulpit is by R. Norman Shaw.

== Bells ==
The church has a ring of bells for bell ringing. The present set of bells were all cast in 1948 at the nearby Taylor's Bell Foundry in Loughborough.

Bell	Weight	Nominal	Diameter
Bell	hundredweights-quarters-pounds	Nominal	Diameter
Treble	4-1-23	F	26.50 "
2	4-3-12	E	27.63"
3	5-1-6	D	29.00 "
4	6-0-16	C	31.00 "
5	7-1-4	Bb	33.50 "
6	8-0-0	A	35.00 "
7	10-1-24	G	38.56 "
Tenor	15-0-0	F	43.50 "

== Organ ==
The church has a two manual pipe organ by Henry Willis, located in an organ loft to the east of the nave. A specification of the organ can be found on the National Pipe Organ Register
