= Hallaton Castle =

Former castle in Leicestershire, England

Coordinates: 52.56255°N 0.85078°W

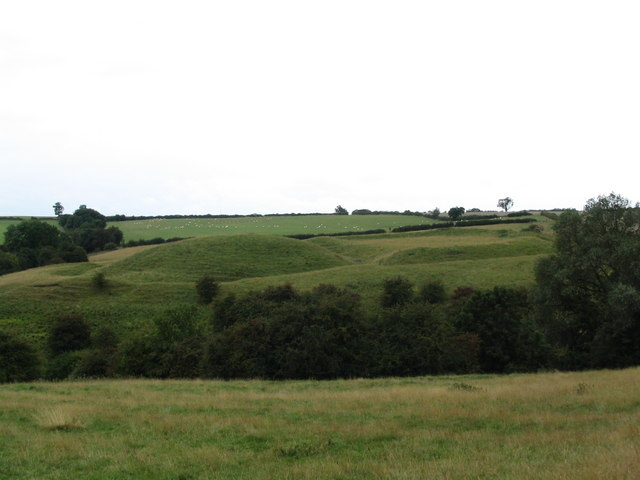
Hallaton Castle motte and earthworks, 2006

Hallaton Castle was situated to the west of the village of Hallaton, which lies some 20 km to the south-east of the city of Leicester (grid reference SP780967). It seems likely that the castle formed the administrative centre of an estate owned by Geoffrey Alselin, which is described in the Domesday Book of 1086, pinpointing the construction of the castle happening before 1086 but after 1066.

This was an interesting motte and bailey castle with an additional rectangular enclosure now surviving as an earthwork, 118 feet (36 m) high, and 630 feet (190 m) in circumference, on which stood the keep, occupying, with the outworks, about 2 acres (8,100 m^{2}) of ground.

The earthworks only are present today.
