= St Peter & St Paul's Church, Syston =

St Peter and St Paul’s Church, Syston
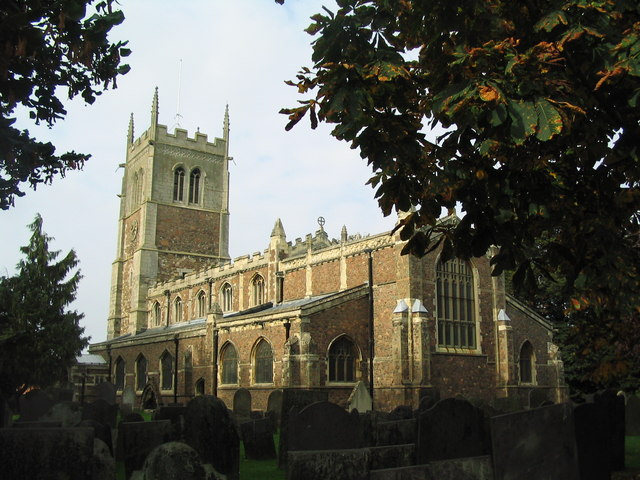
- St Peter and St Paul’s Church, Syston
- St Peter and St Paul’s Church, Syston
- 52°42′1.92″N 1°4′29.68″W
- OS grid reference: SK 62624 11859
- Location: Syston
- Country: England
- Denomination: Church of England

History
- Dedication: St Peter and St Paul

Architecture
- Heritage designation: Grade I listed

Administration
- Diocese: Diocese of Leicester
- Archdeaconry: Leicester
- Deanery: Goscote
- Parish: Syston

St Peter and St Paul's Church, Syston is a Grade I listed parish church in the Church of England in Syston, Leicestershire.

== History ==
The earliest parts of the church date from the 13th century.

The nave and tower were restored by Frederick Webster Ordish of Queniborough at a cost of £1,600 and reopened in February 1872

The chancel was replaced in 1880 at a cost of £2,300. Duston stone was used for the walls with Clipstone and Bath stone for the pillars and corbels. The floor was laid with Portland and red Mansfield stone, the aisles being laid with Staffordshire quarries. The carving was done by Thomas Earp of London. It re-opened on 27 May 1881.

== Organ ==
The organ dates from 1887 and is by Taylor of Leicester A specification of the organ can be found on the National Pipe Organ Register.

== Clock ==
A turret clock with an hour strike and quarter chimes by John Smith of Derby was installed at a cost of £106 (equivalent to £10,600 in 2025) in 1875.

== Parish status ==
The church is part of The Fosse Team which comprises the following churches

- St Mary's Church, Barkby
- St Hilda's Church, East Goscote
- Holy Trinity Church, Thrussington
- St Botolph's Church, Ratcliffe-on-the-Wreake
- St Michael and All Angels’ Church, Rearsby
- St Mary's Church, Queniborough
- St Michael and All Angels’ Church, Thurmaston
