= Mountsorrel Cross =

Structure in Leicestershire, England

Coordinates: 52°42′29.75″N 1°10′39.47″W

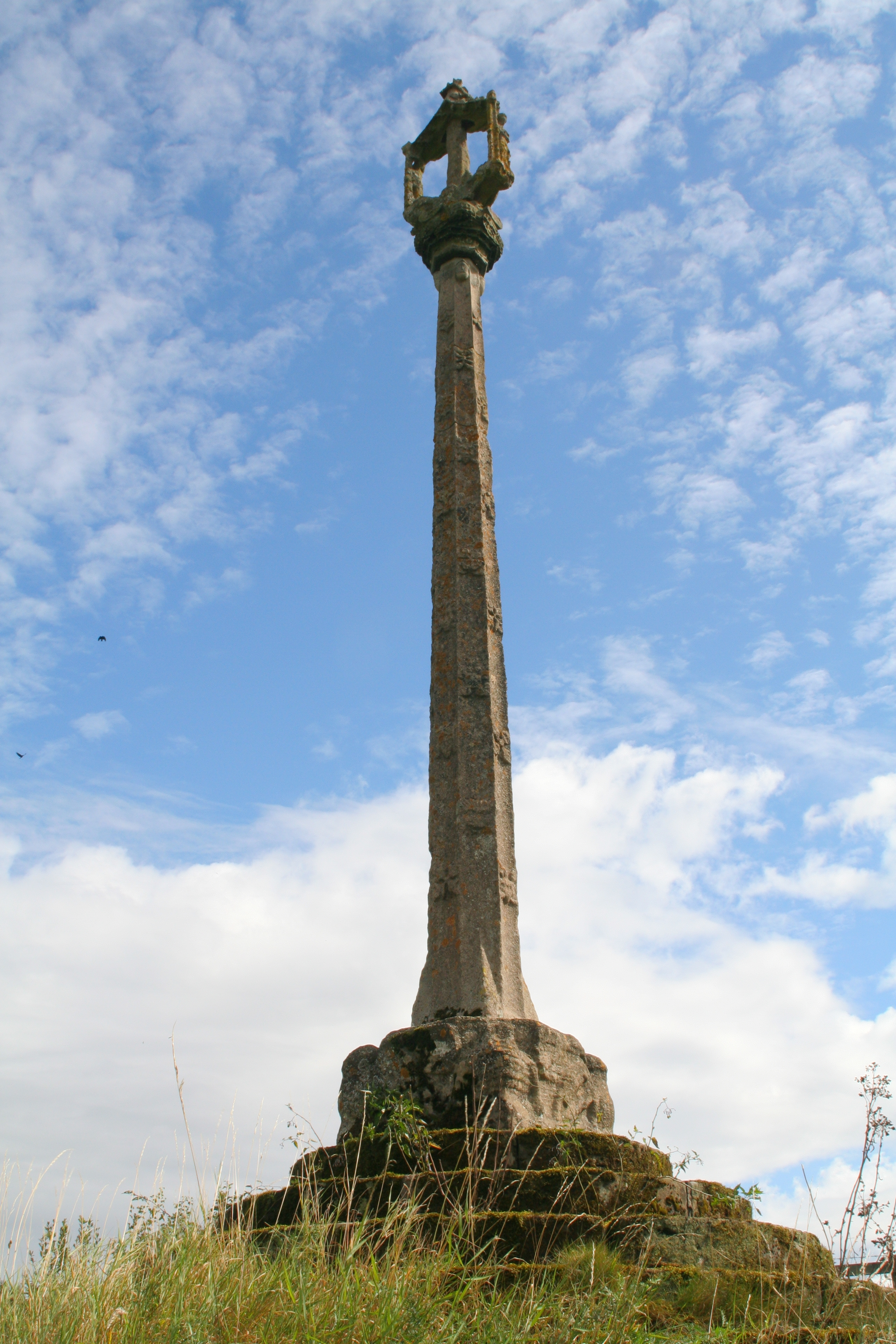

The Mountsorrel Cross is a market cross that dates from the Middle Ages. It originally stood on Main Street in the village of Mountsorrel, Leicestershire, but was moved in the late 18th century to a position 250 metres south-east of St Leonard's Church, Swithland, where it still stands. It is a Grade I listed feature.
