= Hallaton =

Village in Leicestershire, England

Coordinates: 52.562°N 0.836°W

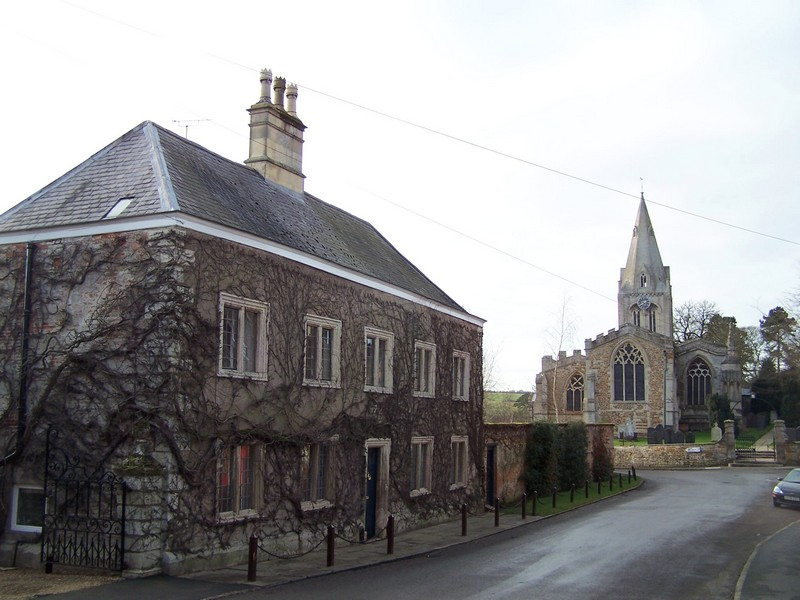

- Location within Leicestershire
- Population: 594 (2011 Census)
- District: Harborough
- Shire county: Leicestershire
- Region: East Midlands
- Country: England
- Sovereign state: United Kingdom
- Post town: MARKET HARBOROUGH
- Postcode district: LE16
- Dialling code: 01858
- Police: Leicestershire
- Fire: Leicestershire
- Ambulance: East Midlands
- UK Parliament: Rutland and Stamford

Hallaton is a village and civil parish in the Harborough district of Leicestershire, England. According to the 2001 census the parish had a population of 523, which had increased to 594 at the 2011 census.

== History and description ==
The village's name means 'farm/settlement on a nook of land'.

Hallaton Hall and its lands were owned by Calverley and Amelia Jane Bewicke in 1845. Their daughter was the writer and campaigner Alicia Little. As the site of two markets Hallaton was despite its size regarded as a town, even if one of little significance.

The parish church is dedicated to St Michael and is mainly of the 13th century: the aisles were added a century later. The church is sited on rising ground and has a dignified tower with a fine broach spire (one of the best in the county); the nave and chancel and aisles have nobility and beauty. The sculptured stonework of the north aisle contrasts with the plain battlemented south aisle. A former rector is commemorated by a handsome monument attached to one of the corners.

The village has a famous bottle kicking ritual and "Hare Pie Scramble", which take place usually on Easter Monday. There is a small village museum, offering history of the area. The Hallaton Treasure, a late Iron Age hoard of more than 5,000 silver and gold coins was found at a site near Hallaton in 2000.

In 1736 smallpox affected the town when George Fenwick was the rector.

As of 2019, Hallaton has two pubs, The Bewicke Arms on Eastgate, and The Fox, on North End.

Hallaton railway station was on the line between Market Harborough and Nottingham but closed in 1953.

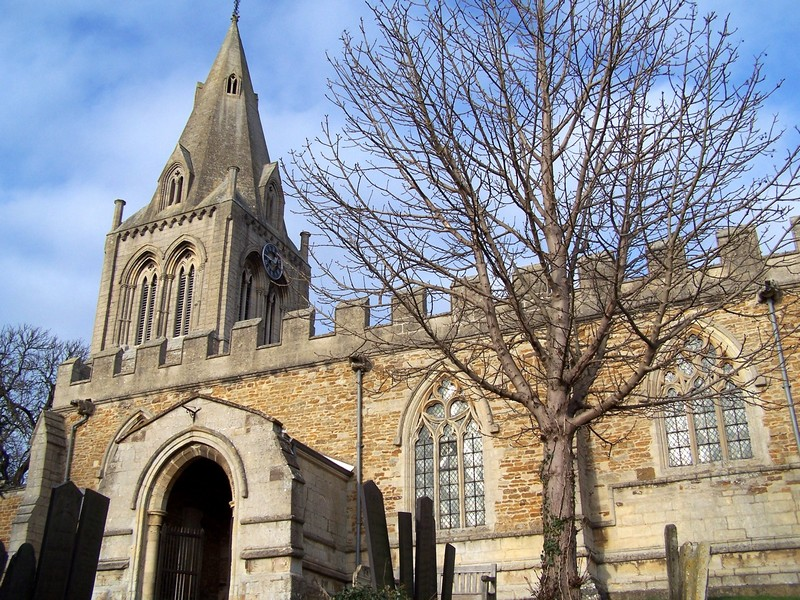
St Michael's parish church, Hallaton

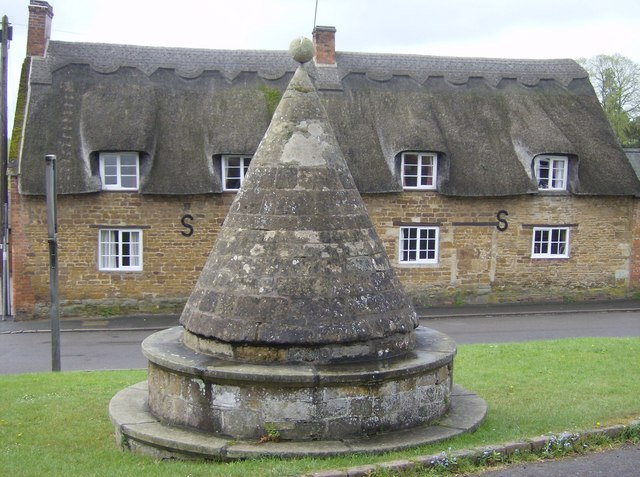
The butter cross

== See also ==
- Hallaton Castle
- St. Michael's parish church, Hallaton
