= All Saints' Church, Asfordby =

Church in Asfordby, Leicestershire

Coordinates: 52°45′48″N 0°57′07″W

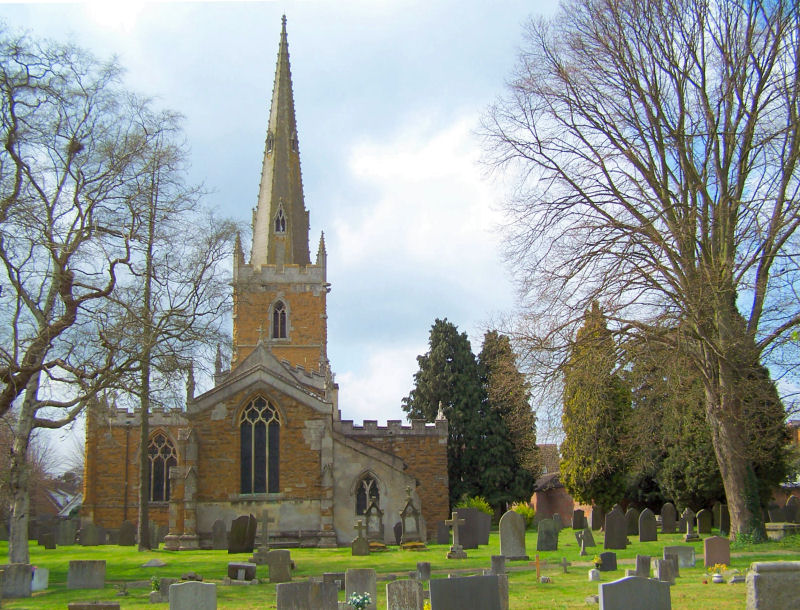
- Denomination: Church of England

History
- Dedication: All Saints'

Administration
- Diocese: Leicester
- Archdeaconry: Leicester
- Parish: Asfordby, Leicestershire

Clergy
- Rector: Peter Hooper

All Saints' Church is a church in Asfordby, Leicestershire, England. It is a Grade I listed building.

== History ==
The church is made up of a nave, tower, chancel, north and south aisles, south transept and south porch. The tower dates from the Perpendicular period (1380-1520), and has a spire, battlements, pinnacles and gargoyles. The clerestory and the roof also date from the Perpendicular period.

The south aisle has circular piers, one of the bases has a seat around it. The north aisle has octagonal piers. George Gilbert Scott restored the chancel in 1866-67 and the following two years saw further work on the rest of the church. The south aisle has a Saxon sculpture which is thought to have belonged to an old cross.
