= Owston Abbey =

Monastery in Leicestershire, England

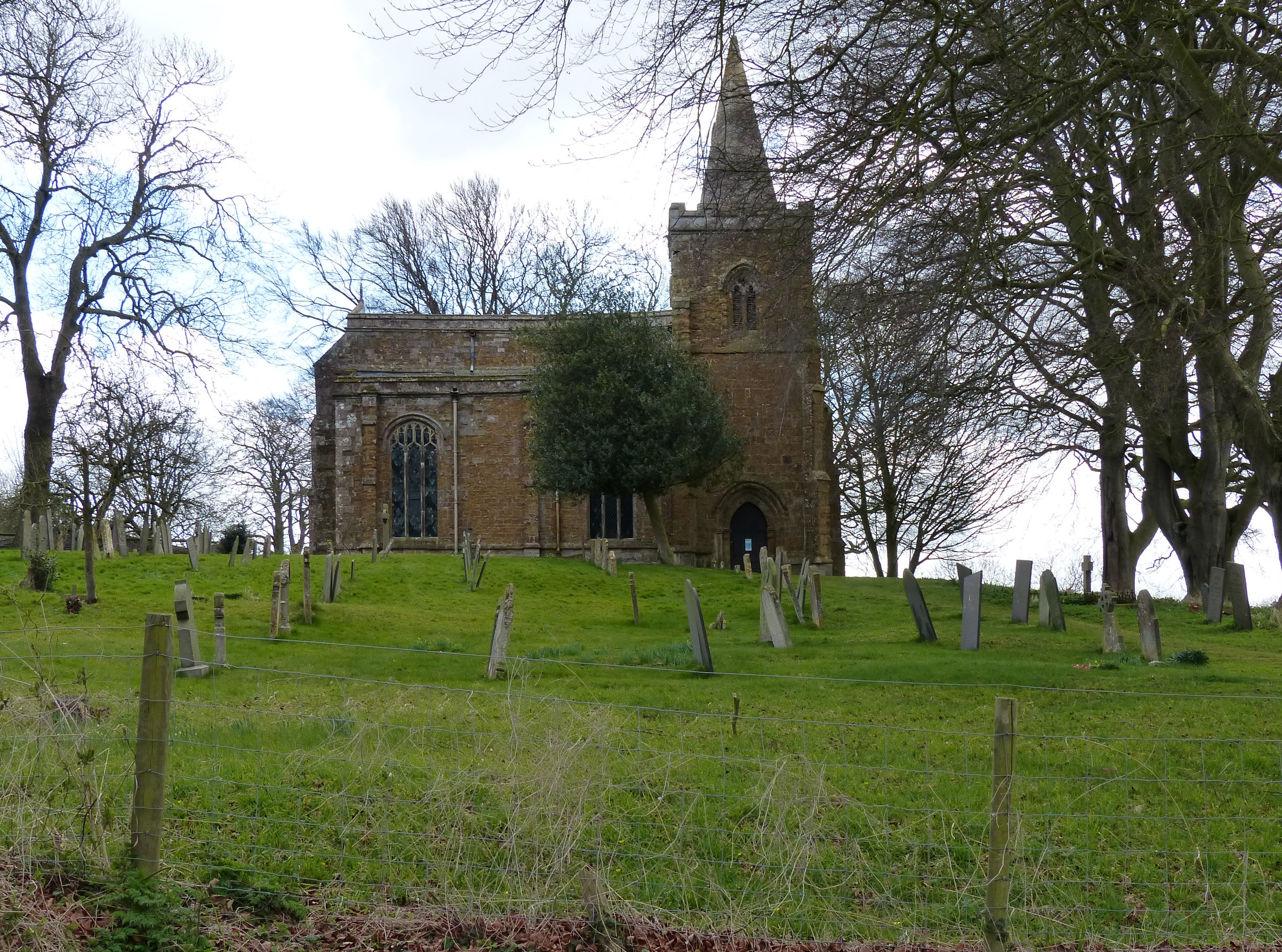
- St Andrew's church, Owston, incorporates part of the former abbey.

- Location within Leicestershire
- Interactive map of Owston Abbey

Monastery information
- Order: Canons Regular
- Established: Before 1161
- Disestablished: 1536
- Dedication: St Andrew
- Diocese: Lincoln

People
- Founder: Robert Grimbald

Site
- Location: Leicestershire, United Kingdom
- Coordinates: 52.663842°N 0.856526°W
- Visible remains: Parts incorporated into the current St Andrew's Parish Church.

Owston Abbey was an Augustinian monastery in Owston, Leicestershire, England.

== History ==
Owston Abbey was founded before 1161 by Robert Grimbald. The abbey was endowed with the church and manor of Owston. By 1166 the abbey had also acquired the advowsons of the churches of Burrough, King's Norton and Slawston, in Leicestershire; Tickencote in Rutland; and North Witham in Lincolnshire. Around 1341 the abbey also gained the manor and church of Muston, Leicestershire, and was granted the manor of Normanton by Robert de Golville.

Despite its endowment and rank, "Owston remained one of the smaller and poorer Augustinian houses". When the abbey was visited by William Alnwick, Bishop of Lincoln, in 1440, the abbey was described as being in poverty. It had an annual income of only £40, but debts of 100 marks.

In 1377 there were 17 canons at the abbey, and in 1440 there were 15. By 1534 the number had fallen again to 11 and by 1536 only 6 canons remained at the abbey.

In 1534 the Abbot and 11 canons accepted King Henry VIII's royal supremacy over the church. In the Valor Ecclesiasticus of 1535 the abbey was recorded among the smaller religious houses, with an annual income of £161.14s. 2d. The abbey was dissolved with the smaller monasteries in 1536. All of the canons of the abbey wished to give up their monastic lives and the abbot was awarded an annual pension of £18. By 1556 the abbey is described as being "ruined".

The chancel and other fragments of the abbey church were incorporated into the present St Andrew's parish church on the site. A gatehouse at the south-west corner of the nave was demolished in the 18th century and remains of earthworks and foundations can be found to the south and south-west of the present church, along with several fish-ponds which have been environmentally investigated. The abbey's cloister is thought to have been to the south of the church, and some associated stonework exists below ground.

The site is a scheduled monument and St Andrew's church a Grade I listed building.

=== Abbots of Owston Abbey ===
List of Abbots of Owston Abbey:

- Odo, occurs in or before 1161.
- Edward, occurs 1183-4.
- Ralph, occurs 1202.
- Richard, admitted 1236.
- Peter of Leycestre, elected 1241, died 1264.
- William of Flamstead, elected 1264, died 1268.
- Ivo of Cosseby, elected 1268, resigned 1280.
- John Chaumberleyn, elected 1280, resigned 1284.
- Ivo of Cosseby, elected 1284, resigned 1286.
- Robert of Lincoln, elected 1286, died 1289.
- Ernald of Slawston, elected 1289, died 1298.
- Richard of Bokesworth, elected 1298, died 1316.
- Robert of Staunford, elected 1316, resigned 1322.
- William of Braunston, elected 1322.
- John of Kibbeworth, occurs 1344, died 1355.
- William of Cottesmore, elected 1355, resigned 1401.
- Robert of Nouesle, elected 1401, resigned 1421.
- William Kilpesham, elected 1421, died 1467.
- Robert Kirkeby, elected 1467, resigned 1481.
- Henry Medban, elected 1481, occurs 1497.
- John Belton, admitted 1504, resigned 1520.
- John Slawston, last abbot, elected 1520.
