= Knossington =

Village in Leicestershire, England

Coordinates: 52.669°N 0.815°W

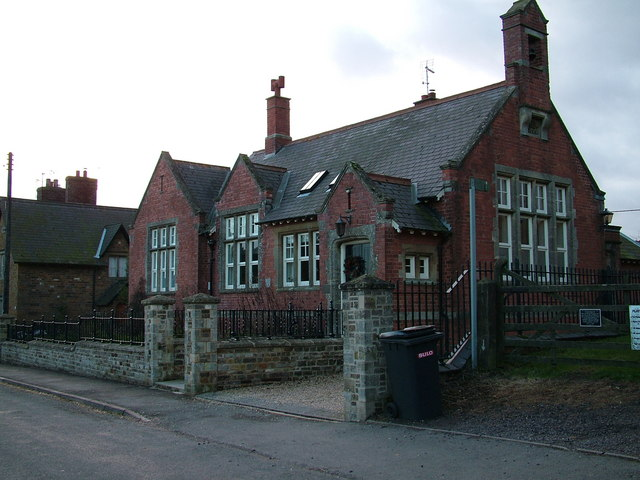
- The old school, Knossington

- Location within Leicestershire
- Population: 316 (2011)
- OS grid reference: SK801086
- Civil parish: Knossington and Cold Overton
- District: Melton
- Shire county: Leicestershire
- Region: East Midlands
- Country: England
- Sovereign state: United Kingdom
- Post town: OAKHAM
- Postcode district: LE15
- Dialling code: 01664
- Police: Leicestershire
- Fire: Leicestershire
- Ambulance: East Midlands
- UK Parliament: Melton and Syston

Knossington is a village and former civil parish, now in the parish of Knossington and Cold Overton, in the Melton borough of Leicestershire, England. It is located close to the border with Rutland, around 4 miles (6.4 km) west of Oakham. The population of the civil parish of Knossington and Cold Overton at the 2011 census was 316.

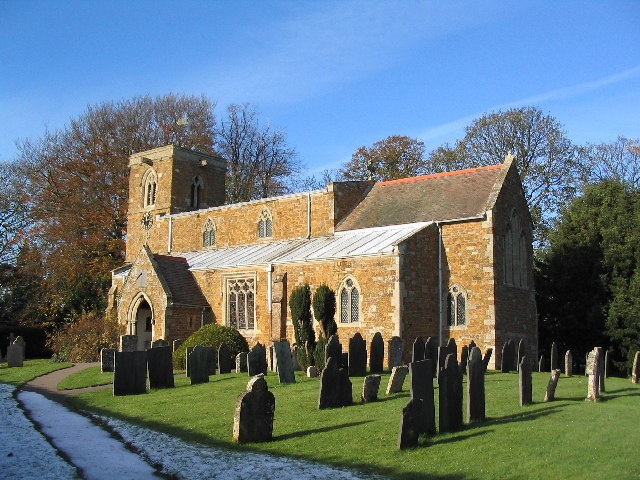
St Peter's church

It has been a designated conservation area since 1977.

== History and notable buildings ==
Knossington is listed in the Domesday Book, having 31 households, in the hundred of Gartree.

In the south of the village is the Manor House, dating from the 16th or early 17th century.

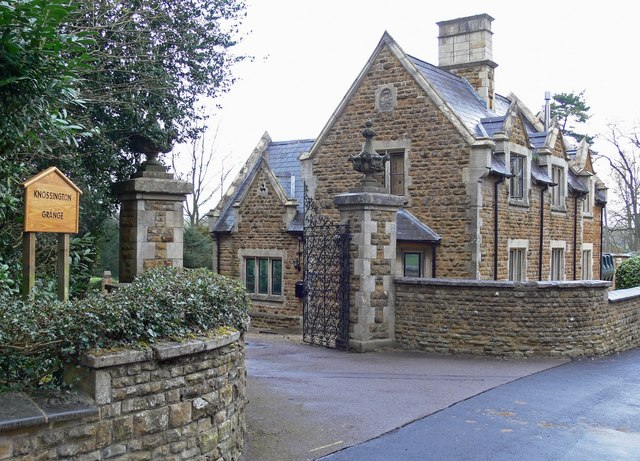
Entrance to Knossington Grange

The west side of the village is dominated by the grounds of Knossington Grange, a large Tudor style mansion built in the late 19th century, now a school.

The 14th-century St Peter's church, restored in 1830, is a Grade II* listed building.

On 1 April 1936 the parish of Cold Overton was merged with Knossington, on 19 December 1984 the parish was renamed "Knossington & Cold Overton". In 1931 the parish of Knossington (prior to the merge) had a population of 252.
