= Edmondthorpe =

Village in Leicestershire, England

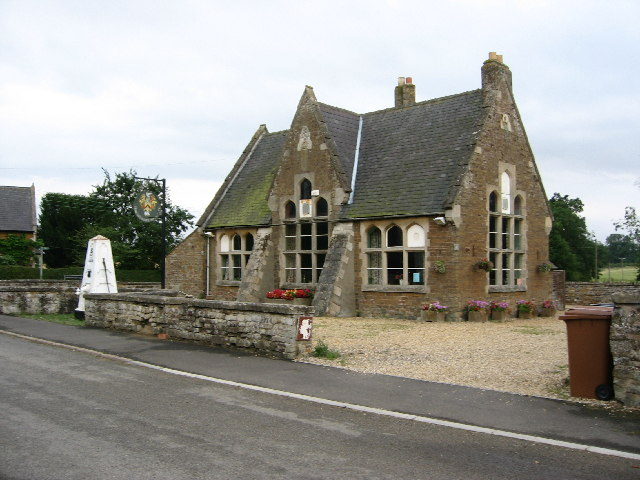
- Edmonthorpe Social Club

- Location within Leicestershire
- Civil parish: Wymondham
- District: Melton
- Shire county: Leicestershire
- Region: East Midlands
- Country: England
- Sovereign state: United Kingdom
- Post town: Melton Mowbray
- Postcode district: LE14
- Police: Leicestershire
- Fire: Leicestershire
- Ambulance: East Midlands
- UK Parliament: Melton and Syston

Edmondthorpe is a small village and former civil parish, now in the parish of Wymondham, in the Melton district, in the county of Leicestershire, England, close to the border with Rutland. In 1931 the parish had a population of 195.

It has Danish origins. The name Edmondthorpe is derived from a corrupted form of the Old English personal name 'Eadmer', in old records spelled variously, Edmersthorp (Domesday Book); Thorp Edmer; Thorp Emeri; Thorp Edmeer; Edmerthorp; or Thorp. The most likely origination of the name could be from the Saxon: ED = East; MUND = mound or barrier; THORPE = a street or village.

On 1 April 1936 the parish was abolished and merged with Wymondham.

The Church of St Michael and All Angels, maintained by The Churches Conservation Trust, is situated in the centre of the surrounding farms and cottages, close to the ruins of Edmondthorpe Hall. Although in former times a number of households from the neighbouring village of Wymondham "parished" to Edmondthorpe, St Michael and All Angels' Church now holds services on special occasions, only. There is a canonical sundial on the south wall. The church holds the tomb of Sir Roger Smith, which includes decorative alabaster figures. A fault in the alabaster of the Smith monument helped give rise to the Edmondthorpe Witch Legend. The legend tells that Lady Ann Smith was a witch who could turn herself into a cat. While a cat, she was wounded in the paw by her butler, and the injury remained on her hand when she became human again.

During the Second World War the Hall (built by Sir Roger Smith in 1621) was used as a military fuel depot, but was destroyed by fire in the early hours of 10 February 1942. This was due to the unsafe handling of hot ashes from a coal fire, according to Edmondthorpe resident, John Gresham (1923-2011). Buildings from the 19th century stable block, which was designed by R. W. Johnson in 1869, remain, and were used to accommodate, firstly Italian, and then over 80 German prisoners of war, until 1947 (perhaps later), as a satellite to Allington Camp, near Grantham. An avenue of mature trees leads from South Lodge (formerly West Lodge) to the Hall through the park on the southern edge of the village.

From the road near South Lodge a set of bee boles, used for keeping bees before the advent of modern hives, may be seen in the wall to the left of the church.

An embanked section of the disused Melton to Oakham Canal lies to the west of the village and loops under the road between Edmondthorpe and Teigh.

There are several families that have lived in Edmondthorpe over many centuries. These include the Veaseys and Extons, which are detailed in the Census transcripts for the village.

== See also ==
- Erasmus Smith
- Smith Baronets
