= St Mary's Church, Barkby =

Church in Leicestershire, England

St. Mary's Church, Barkby
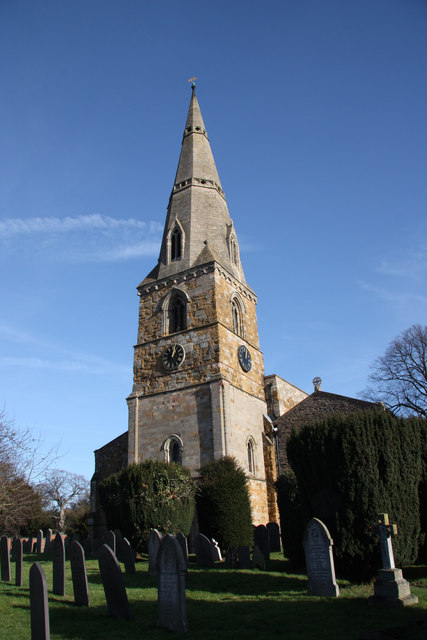
- St. Mary's Church, Barkby
- 52°40′57.50″N 1°3′34.50″W
- OS grid reference: SK 63674 09856
- Country: England
- Denomination: Church of England
- Churchmanship: Broad Church

Architecture
- Heritage designation: Grade I listed building
- Architectural type: Perpendicular Gothic

Administration
- Province: Canterbury
- Diocese: Diocese of Leicester
- Parish: Barkby

St Mary's Church, Barkby is the Church of England Parish Church for Barkby, Leicestershire, England. The church dates from the late 13th century and was extensively renovated in the 19th century. The church features a tall and spacious nave and chancel with wide aisles. The tower was built in four stages and is made of different types of stone. The bell chamber holds six bells and is lit by two traceried windows. The church was Grade I listed in 1966.

== Description and history ==
The church, located in the village of Barkby in Leicestershire, England, dates from the late 13th century and was largely renovated in the 19th century. The church has a spacious and tall nave and chancel, flanked by two wide aisle. The chancel was built in the 13th century and is constructed of ironstone rubble. The nave features a four-bay arcade from the late 13th century, with triple-chamfered arches resting on octagonal piers. The low-pitched roof, likely from the 15th century, features tie beams adorned with intricate tracery panels. The south aisle, renovated during the 19th century, was built using granite rubble with limestones. The tracery of the three principal windows and the window above the south doorway displace features characteristic of the Decorated Gothic style.

The tower consists of four stages, with various types of stone. The bell chamber, with six bells, is lit by two traceried windows. Each window incorporates quatrefoils. The parapet is decorated with carved grotesque faces. In the north aisle are several memorial plaques commemorating members of the Pochin family. An old working clock mechanism, relocated from the tower, is displayed in the south aisle. It was Grade I listed in 1966.

== Fosse team ==
The church is a member of the Fosse Team, which consists of eight churches located north of the city of Leicester and east of the ancient Roman road, the Fosse Way. The team includes the following churches:

- St Mary's Church, Barkby
- St Mary's Church, Queniborough
- St Hilda's Church, East Goscote
- Holy Trinity Church, Thrussington
- St Botolph's Church, Ratcliffe-on-the-Wreake
- St Michael and All Angels’ Church, Rearsby
- St Peter & St Paul, Syston
- St Michael and All Angels’ Church, Thurmaston
