= St. Michael's parish church, Hallaton =

St Michael's Church, Hallaton
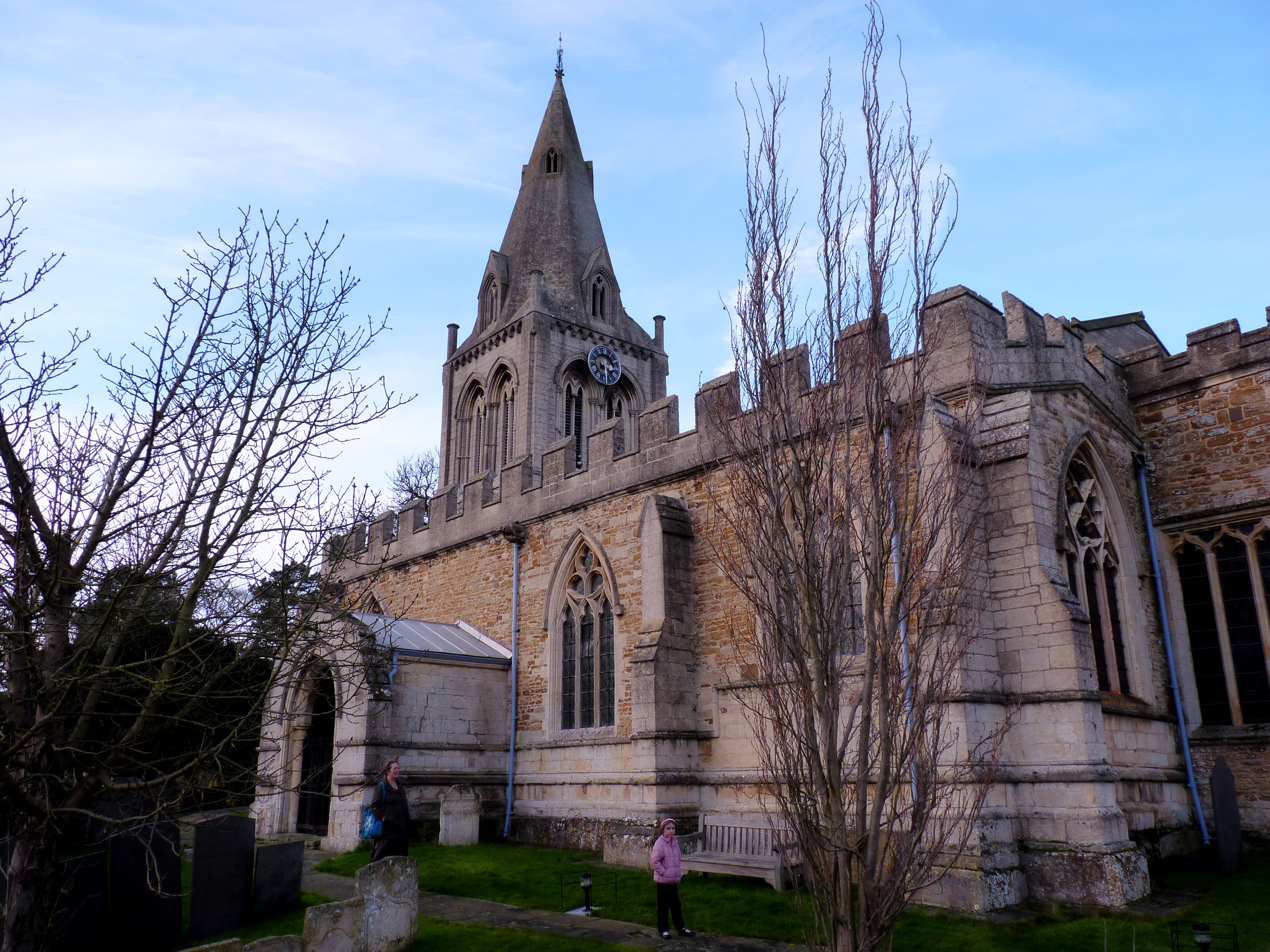
- St Michael's Church, Hallaton
- 52.5609°N 0.8411°W
- OS grid reference: SP 78655 96531
- Country: England
- Denomination: Church of England

History
- Dedication: St Michael and All Angels

Architecture
- Heritage designation: Grade I listed building
- Architectural type: Norman

Administration
- Province: Canterbury
- Diocese: Diocese of Leicester
- Parish: Hallaton

St Michael's church, Hallaton is a parish church in the town of Hallaton, Leicestershire. It is a Grade I listed building.

It is a Norman style church, which dates from the thirteenth century. It has a north porch, built later in the fifteenth century and some of the original timbers still exist today.

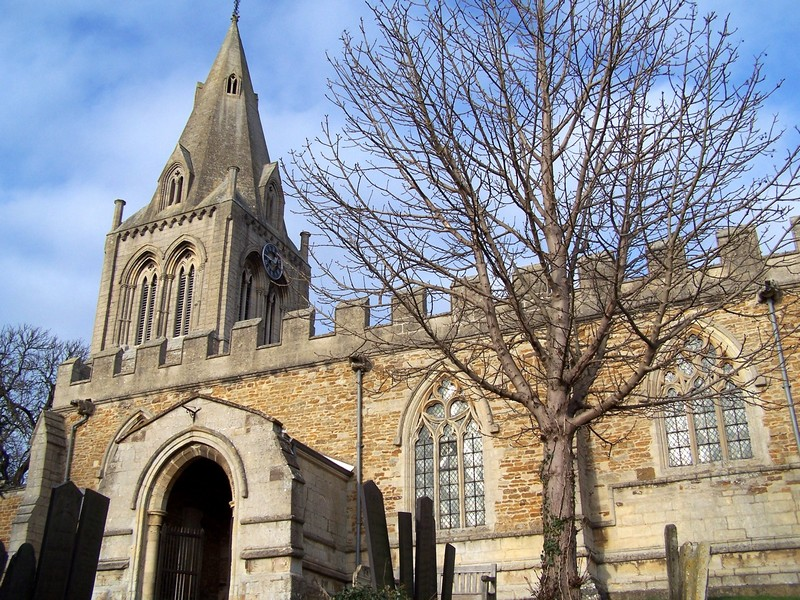
Hallaton parish church

The church is dedicated to St Michael and is mainly of the 13th century: the aisles were added a century later. The church is sited on rising ground and has a dignified tower with a fine broach spire (one of the best in the county); the nave and chancel and aisles have nobility and beauty. The sculptured stonework of the north aisle contrasts with the plain battlemented south aisle. A former rector is commemorated by a handsome monument attached to one of the corners.
