= Cold Overton Hall =

Country house in Leicestershire, England

Coordinates: 52.6823°N 0.8034°W

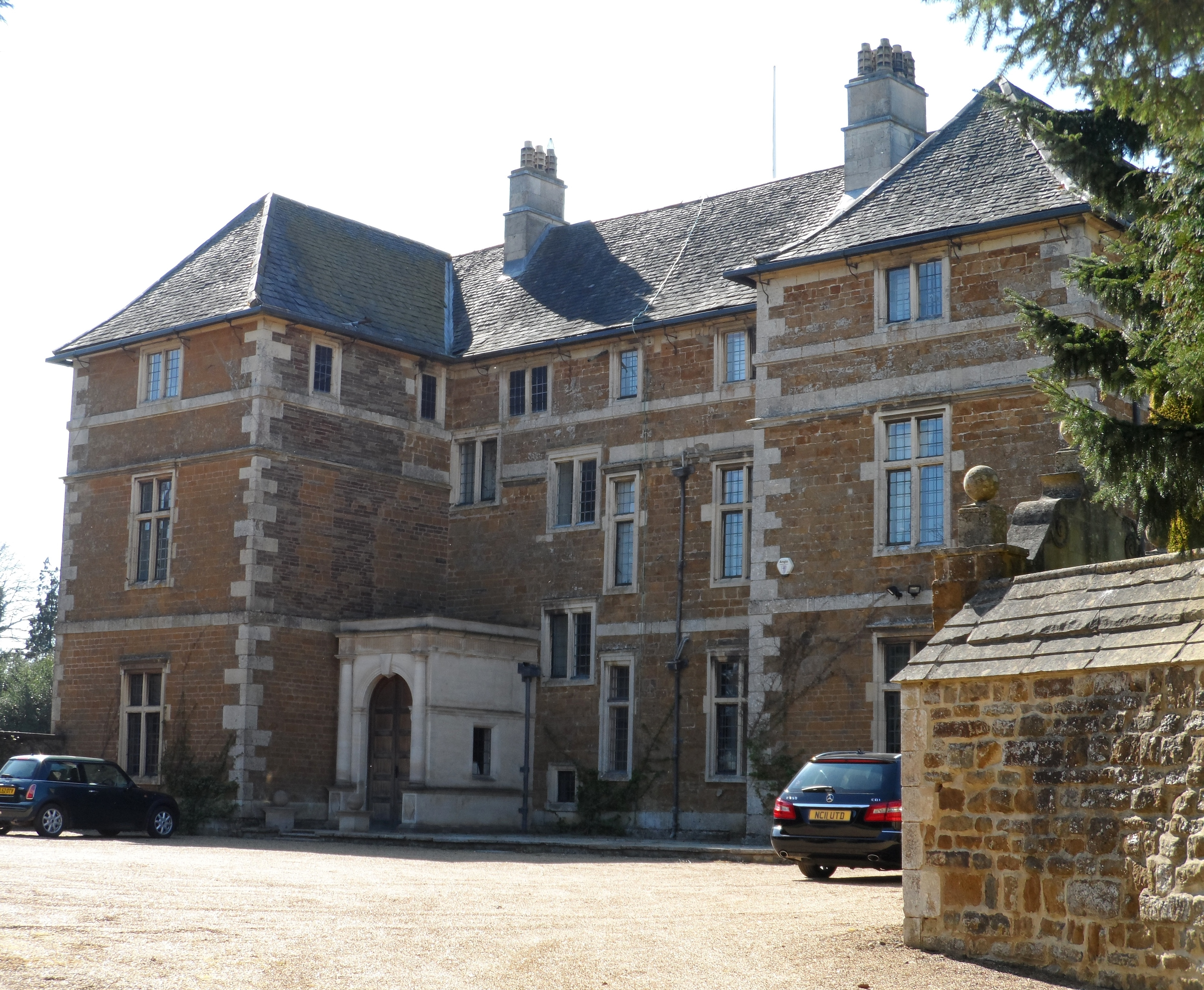
Cold Overton Hall (east front)

Cold Overton Hall is a country house in the village of Cold Overton, Leicestershire, England. Built c. 1630 for John St John, it is a Grade I listed building.

The hall is built in three storeys plus attics with a 5 bay frontage. It is constructed of ironstone with limestone dressings and a hipped Swithland slate roof. The west front has a two-storey flat roofed porch projecting from a pedimented 3 bay centre.

== History ==
John St John, High Sheriff of Leicestershire in 1632, bought the manor of Cold Overton from the Earl of Northampton c.1620 and built the present hall c.1630. The earliest recorded Lord of the Manor is Ulf Fenman in 1066. In the early 18th century, it was sold by the St John family to the self-made merchant Turner family, in which it descended to a John Turner. Having no heir, he willed it to his cousin Layton Frewen, who also died childless and left it in 1777 to his own cousin, the Rev Thomas Frewen, who thereupon adopted the additional surname of Turner. The property passed to his son John Frewen-Turner, who was MP for Athlone (1807–1812) and High Sheriff of Leicestershire in 1791.

In the mid-19th century, the hall was sold to Earl Cowley, who left his wife to live with another woman in France. The hall was bought in 1912 by James Montagu, who carried out a major refurbishment, introducing 16th and 17th century panelling, ceilings, and fireplaces.

It continues to be privately owned by Timothy P Maxted (High Sheriff of Leicestershire 2017)
