= St Michael and All Angels Church, Edmondthorpe =

Coordinates: 52.7488°N 0.7302°W

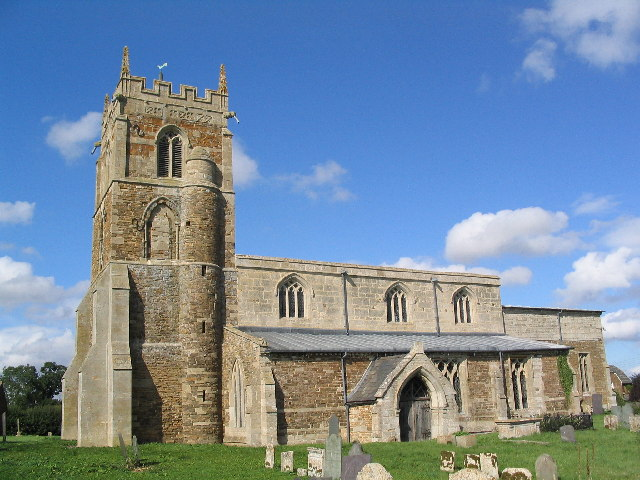
- St Michael and All Angels Church, Edmondthorpe, from the south

- Location in Leicestershire
- OS grid reference: SK 858 175
- Location: Edmondthorpe, Leicestershire
- Country: England
- Denomination: Anglican
- Website: Churches Conservation Trust

History
- Dedication: St Michael and All Angels

Architecture
- Functional status: Redundant
- Heritage designation: Grade I
- Designated: 1 January 1968
- Architectural type: Church
- Style: Gothic
- Groundbreaking: 13th century
- Completed: 15th century

Specifications
- Materials: Ironstone and limestone, lead roofs

St Michael and All Angels Church is a redundant Anglican church in the village of Edmondthorpe, Leicestershire, England. It is recorded in the National Heritage List for England as a designated Grade I listed building, and is under the care of the Churches Conservation Trust.

== History ==
The church tower dates from the 13th century. The chancel also dates from this century. Aisles were added during the following century, and in the 15th century the clerestory was built and the height of the chancel was raised. Alterations were carried out during the 19th century, including re-roofing the north aisle in 1858, installing a new clock in 1860, and a restoration in 1861–62.

== Architecture ==
=== Exterior ===
Parts of the church are constructed in ironstone and others in limestone; the roofs are covered in lead. Its plan consists of a nave with a clerestory, north and south aisles, north and south porches, a chancel, and a west tower.

The tower is in three stages, separated by string courses, with angle buttresses on the west side, and a three-stage semicircular stair turret on the southeast. The bottom stage contains a lancet window on the west side. In the middle stage is a blocked double lancet on each side, and clock dials on the west and north faces. The top stage contains double lancet bell openings on each side. At the top of the tower is a quatrefoil frieze, four gargoyles, a crenellated parapet with pinnacles at the corners, and the tower is surmounted by a pyramidal roof with a weathervane.

The clerestory is in three bays with a moulded parapet, a gable, and three triple lancets on each side. The north aisle has four bays, and it contains three triple lancet windows. In both the east and west ends of the aisle is a triple lancet. The north porch has a gable surmounted by a cross, and it contains stone benches. The chancel is in two bays. At its east end is a triple lancet window, and there are three double lancets along each side, and a blocked doorway on the north side. On the arch of the south porch is a sundial acting as a finial. To the right of the porch is a double and a triple lancet window. At the east end of the south aisle is a blocked triple lancet.

=== Interior ===
The arcades in the nave are in four bays, carried on octagonal piers. In the north wall of the north aisle is a tomb recess with a crocketted gable, to its right is an aumbry, and in the southeast corner is a piscina. There are also aumbries to the left of the chancel arch, and in the north wall of the chancel. The chancel screen dates from the 15th century. On the south wall of the chancel is a piscina with a window seat below it and, to its right, a double sedilia that has been modified to form a monument. The font dates from the 14th century and consists of a round bowl on a square stem. The altar table is from the 17th century, and the altar rail, with barley-sugar balusters, is from the 18th century. Also from the 18th century are a small table and chair, and a benefactions board. Dating from the 19th century are the octagonal pulpit, a desk, the stalls, benches, and a brass lectern. Also in the church are the Royal arms of George III, dated 1777, and two 19th-century oil paintings.

There are monuments to members of the Smith family who lived in nearly Edmondthorpe Hall. The largest of these, dated 1655, is to Sir Roger Smith, his two wives, his son and his grandson. It is constructed in three tiers, and is made in marble, slate and alabaster. There is a baroque monument in marble and slate to Sir Edward Smith, who died in 1707, a classical marble monument to Olivia Smith dated 1710, a rococo monument in different coloured marbles to Edward Smith, who died in 1762, and a classical marble tablet to Margaret Smith dated 1780. Also in the church is an 18th-century hatchment.

== External features ==
The churchyard contains the war graves of two soldiers of World War I.

== See also ==
- List of churches preserved by the Churches Conservation Trust in the English Midlands
