= Botolph of Thorney =

7th-century English abbot and saint

Saint Botolph of Thorney
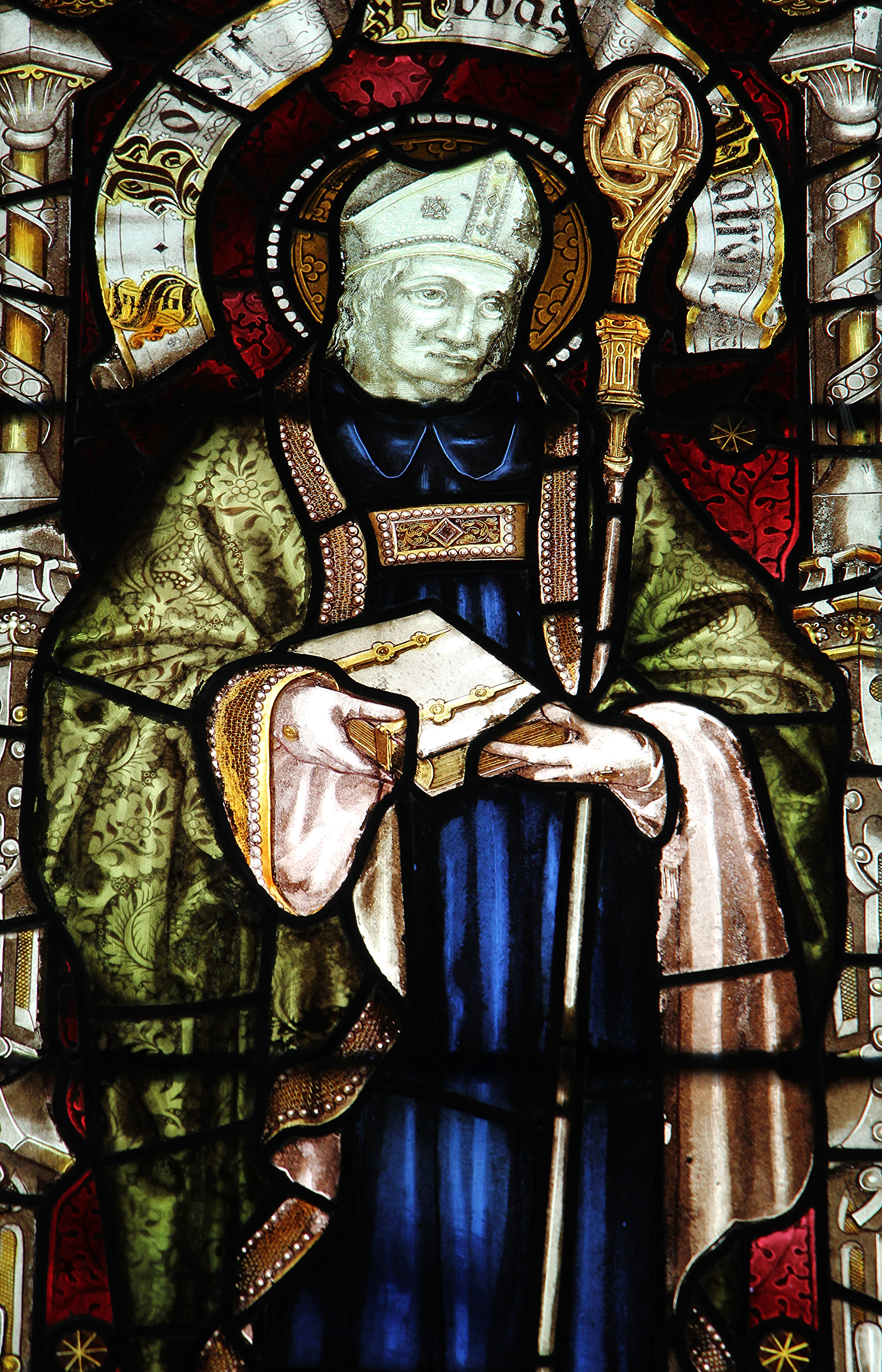
- Stained glass window depicting Botolph at St Botolph's Church, Cambridge
- Born: 7th century
- Died: 680
- Venerated in: Anglican Communion; Eastern Orthodox Church; Catholic Church; Lutheran Churches (particularly in Denmark & Sweden)
- Feast: 17 June (England); 25 June (Scotland); 1 December (translation of relics)
- Patronage: Travellers and farming

Botolph of Thorney (/ˈbɒtʊlf/; also called Botolph, Botulph or Botulf; later known as Saint Botolph; died c. 680) was an English abbot and saint. He is regarded as the patron saint of boundaries, and by extension, of trade and travel, as well as various aspects of farming. His feast day is celebrated either on 17 June (England) or 25 June (Scotland).

== Life and works ==
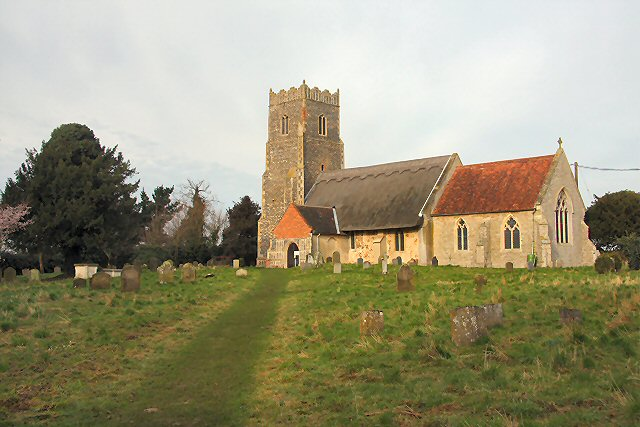
St Botolph's Church, Iken, Suffolk

Little is known about the life of Botolph, other than doubtful details in an account written four hundred years after his death by the 11th-century monk Folcard. Botolph was born sometime in the early 7th century to noble Saxon parents who were Christians. He and his brother Adulph were educated by Saint Fursey at Cnobheresburg monastery. They were then sent to study on the Continent, where they became Benedictines. Adulph remained abroad, where he is said to have become a Bishop.

Botolph, returning to England, found favour with a certain "King of the southern Angles", whose sisters he had known in Germany, and was by him permitted to choose a tract of desolate land upon which to build a monastery. The Anglo-Saxon Chronicle records for the year 654: "The Middle Angles, under earldorman Peada, received the true faith. King Anna was killed and Botolph began to build the church at Ikanho".

Botolph founded the monastery of Icanho. Icanho, which means 'ox hill', has been identified as Iken, located by the estuary of the River Alde in Suffolk; a church still remains on top of an isolated hill in the parish. At the time, the site was a tidal island all but surrounded by water, but Botolph attracted other monks and hermits and together they turned areas of marsh and scrub into productive grazing and farm land. The monks built several structures, and the monastery grew. Botolph also worked as an itinerant missionary in East Anglia, Kent and Sussex.

The Life of St Ceolfrith, written around the time of Bede by an unknown author, mentions an abbot named Botolph in East Anglia, "a man of remarkable life and learning, full of the grace of the Holy Spirit". (Note: For a summary of the politics of East Anglia in the transition between Paganism and Christianity, see Care Evans, A., Chapters 13 and 14.) Ceolfrith visited him about the year 670.

Botolph is supposed to have been originally buried at his foundation of Icanho, but in 970 Edgar I of England gave permission for the remains of Botolph to be transferred to Burgh, near Woodbridge, to prevent them from being destroyed by invading Danes. They remained for some fifty years before being transferred to their own tomb at Bury St Edmunds Abbey on the instructions of Cnut. The saint's relics were later transferred again, along with those of his brother Adulph, to Thorney Abbey, although his head was transferred to Ely Abbey and various body parts to other houses, including Westminster Abbey.

== Church dedications ==
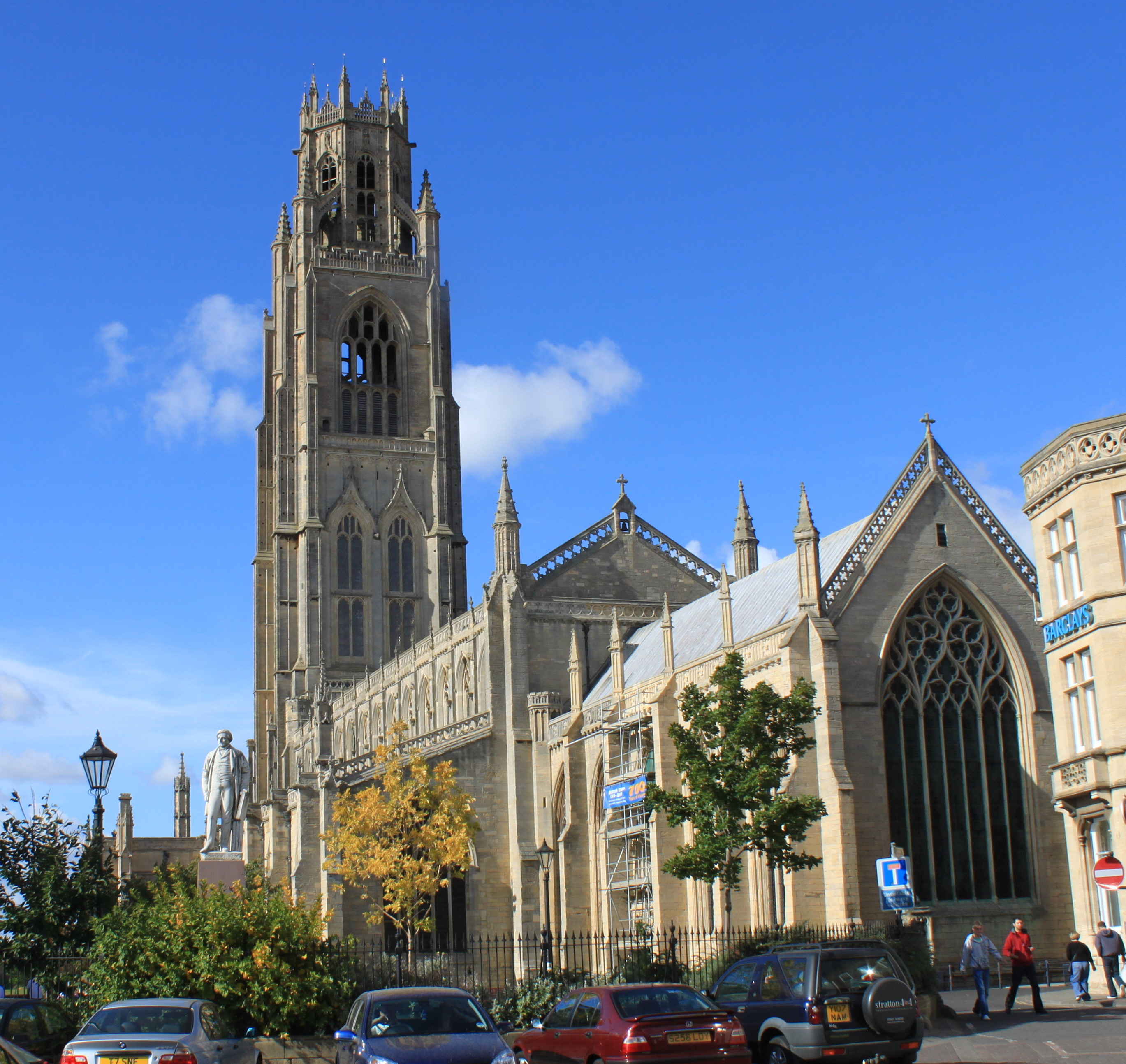
St Botolph's Church, the earliest church in Boston, Lincolnshire

Many English churches are dedicated to Botolph. According to the Oxford Dictionary of Saints, 64 ancient English churches were dedicated to him, but later research has suggested the true number may have been as high as 71, with a high concentration of dedications in East Anglia. St Botolph's Church in Boston, Lincolnshire, known locally as "The Stump", is one of the most famous. Boston, or 'Botolph's town' also gave Boston, Massachusetts its name. The village of Botolphs in West Sussex is named for the Saxon church there first dedicated to St Botolph dating from 950.

St Botolph's Priory in Colchester, Essex, the first Augustinian monastery in England, was built on an earlier Anglo-Saxon church dedicated to Botolph. St Botolph's Church in Hardham, West Sussex, houses some of the most ancient surviving wall paintings in Britain, including the earliest known depiction of St. George in England.

In Botolph's role as a patron saint of travellers, four City of London churches were dedicated to him, all of which were close to gates in the City walls: St Botolph Billingsgate, which was destroyed in the Great Fire and never rebuilt; St Botolph's, Aldersgate, St Botolph-without-Bishopsgate, where the poet John Keats was baptised, and St Botolph's Aldgate. It is believed that these dedications were made because the churches provided places for incoming travellers to give thanks for their safe arrival and for outgoing travellers to pray for a safe journey. An alternative possibility is that the churches were dedicated to the saint because his relics came through the four gates when Edgar moved them from Iken to Westminster Abbey.

Beyond the North Sea, Budolfi Church (Sankt Budolfi kirke) in Aalborg, Denmark, originally a smallish building, grew to be the major church of the town by the late Middle Ages and is now the cathedral church of the diocese of Aalborg.

== Secular connections ==
Botolph is remembered in the names of the market town of Boston, Lincolnshire in the United Kingdom and thereby Boston, Massachusetts, in the United States. Boston was originally Botolphston (from "Botolph's stone" or "Botolph's town").

In Boston, Massachusetts, Botolph gives his name to the St Botolph Club, a private club, a street in Boston's Back Bay neighborhood, and the President's House at Boston College.

The University of Cambridge's poetry journal in the 1950s was called St Botolph's Review. It was named for St Botolph's Church, Cambridge as one of its founders, Lucas Myers, lived at the rectory of St Botolph's Church in Cambridge. A second edition of the journal was published in 2006. "St Botolph's College" has been used as a hypothetical college in Cambridge University communications and Tripos examinations.

The parish of Buttsbury in Essex was initially called Botolfvespirie, meaning Botolph's Pear Tree. It is sometimes surmised that the name refers to a tree under which St Botolph preached.

There is a St Botolph's Brook on the boundary between Colchester and the village of West Bergholt. Despite there being a St Botolph's church in Colchester, J. Horace Round, the Victorian historian, agreed with the earlier theory that in this case Botolph is a corruption of Godulf, an Anglo-Saxon name.

== See also ==
- Anglo-Saxon Christianity
- Christianisation of Anglo-Saxon England
- List of Catholic saints

== Sources ==
- Attwater, D., The Penguin Dictionary of Saints, London (1965)
- Care Evans, A., The Sutton Hoo Ship Burial, London (1986) ISBN 0-7141-0544-9
- Ryan, George E., Botolph Of Boston, Christopher Publishing House (1971) ISBN 0-8158-0252-8
- Savage, A., The Anglo-Saxon Chronicles, Godalming (1995) ISBN 1-85833-478-0
