= Cold Overton =

Village in Leicestershire, England

Coordinates: 52.6822°N 0.80334°W

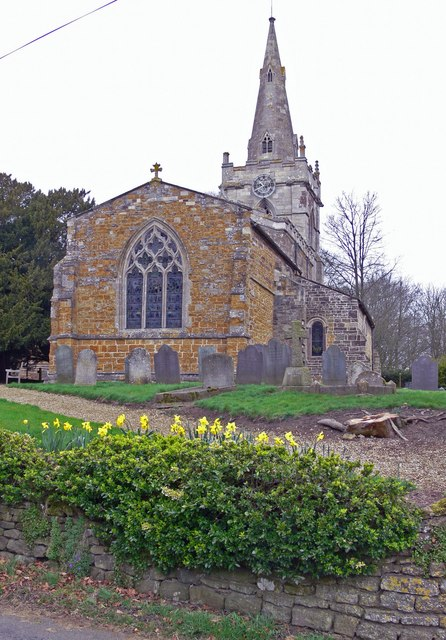
- St John the Baptist Church

- Location within Leicestershire
- OS grid reference: SK809100
  - London: 85 mi (137 km) S
- Civil parish: Knossington and Cold Overton
- District: Melton
- Shire county: Leicestershire
- Region: East Midlands
- Country: England
- Sovereign state: United Kingdom
- Post town: OAKHAM
- Postcode district: LE15
- Dialling code: 01664
- Police: Leicestershire
- Fire: Leicestershire
- Ambulance: East Midlands
- UK Parliament: Melton and Syston

Cold Overton is a village and former civil parish, now in the parish of Knossington and Cold Overton, in the Melton district of Leicestershire, England. It is close to the border with Rutland, and approximately 3 miles (5 km) west from the market and county town of Oakham, and 1.5 miles (2.4 km) south-west of the A606 road. In 1931 the parish had a population of 133.

== History ==
The village's name means 'farm/settlement on a ridge'. 'Cold' was added because of the village's exposed position.

Cold Overton is listed in the Domesday Book as in the Framland Hundred of Leicestershire, with 12 ploughlands, 17 households, 4 freemen, 8 villagers, 4 smallholders, and a priest. The settlement contained a meadow and woodland, both of 30 acres (0.1 km^{2}). Lordship in 1066 was held by Ulf Fenman, transferred to Fulco in 1086, with Drogo de la Beuvrière as Tenant-in-chief.

In 1870 Cold Overton was a parish in the district of Oakham. The Syston and Peterborough Railway ran close by. The area of the parish was 1,657 acres (6.7 km^{2}) in which were 19 houses and a population of 97.

In 1826 was founded an “Asylum for Female Orphans” which maintained and educated 20 girls. This orphanage had been discontinued by 1877, and in its place was established a free school for local boys and girls. Occupations in 1877 included eight graziers, four of whom were farmers, a further farmer and a market gardener. Also listed was a schoolmistress, the parish rector, and Frewen family occupants of Cold Overton Hall.

On 1 April 1936 the parish was abolished and merged with Knossington.

== St John the Baptist Church ==
The Grade I listed village church is dedicated to John the Baptist. Originating in the 13th century, there were additions during the following two centuries and a restoration in 1889 Inside the Church the north and south arcades have notable Early English carved capitals, showing people, animals and motifs from nature. There are medieval paintings on the south and east walls; the images include St Catherine holding a wheel, the Assumption of the Virgin, the Nativity, the Funeral of the Virgin, complete with pall-bearers, and St John the Baptist.

== Cold Overton Hall ==
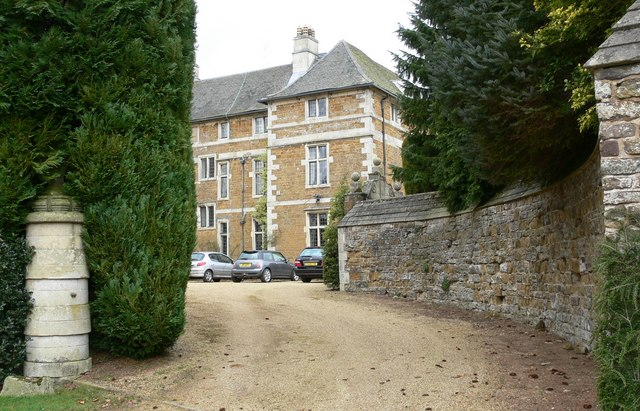
Cold Overton Hall

At the centre of the village is the Grade I listed Cold Overton Hall, a country house of c. 1664 with early 19th-century additions.
