= St Mary's Church, Queniborough =

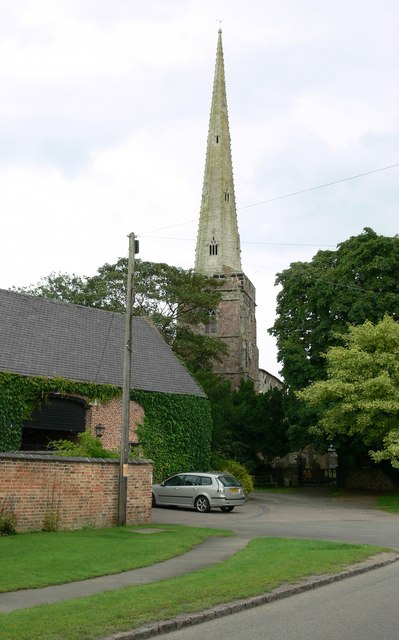
- St Mary's Church, Queniborough
- 52°42′8.50″N 1°2′17.50″W
- OS grid reference: SK 65080 12068
- Country: England
- Denomination: Church of England
- Churchmanship: Broad Church

History
- Dedication: St Mary

Architecture
- Heritage designation: Grade I listed building
- Architectural type: Perpendicular Gothic

Administration
- Province: Canterbury
- Diocese: Diocese of Leicester
- Parish: Queniborough

St Mary's Church, Queniborough is the Church of England parish church of Queniborough, Leicestershire, England. The church mostly dates from the late 13th and early 14th centuries. It was Grade I listed in 1966. The church has a ring of 6 bells for bell ringing.

The churchyard contains war graves of a Royal Field Artillery soldier of World War I and an airman of World War II.

== Parish status ==
The church is part of The Fosse Team which comprises the following churches

- St Mary's Church, Barkby
- St Hilda's Church, East Goscote
- Holy Trinity Church, Thrussington
- St Botolph's Church, Ratcliffe-on-the-Wreake
- St Michael and All Angels’ Church, Rearsby
- St Peter & St Paul, Syston
- St Michael and All Angels’ Church, Thurmaston
