= Swithland =

Village in Leicestershire, England

Coordinates: 52.713228°N 1.188036°W

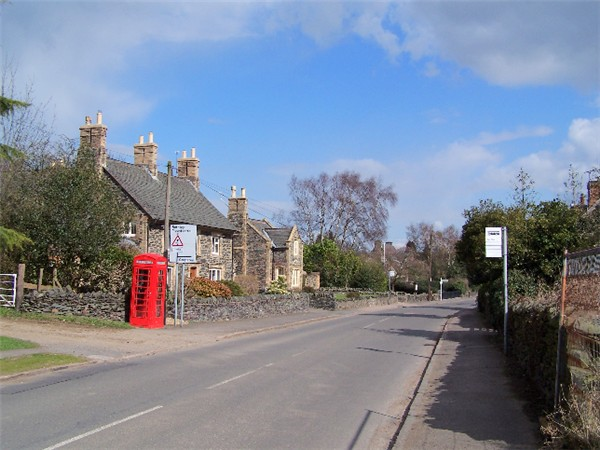
- Main Street, Swithland

- Location within Leicestershire
- Population: 230 (2004 population estimate)
- OS grid reference: SK549131
- District: Charnwood
- Shire county: Leicestershire
- Region: East Midlands
- Country: England
- Sovereign state: United Kingdom
- Post town: Loughborough
- Postcode district: LE12
- Dialling code: 01509
- Police: Leicestershire
- Fire: Leicestershire
- Ambulance: East Midlands
- UK Parliament: Mid Leicestershire

Swithland is a linear village in the Charnwood borough of Leicestershire, England. The civil parish population was put at 230 in 2004 and 217 in the 2011 census. It is in the old Charnwood Forest, between Cropston, Woodhouse and Woodhouse Eaves. It has a village hall, a parish church and a public house, the Griffin Inn. The village is known for the slate that was quarried in the area.

== History ==
Swithland was originally held by Groby. Part of the village had become held by the Danvers (originally called D'Anvers) family by 1412, and between 1509 and 1796, the whole village was held by the Danvers family. The village includes the 13th-century St Leonard's parish church, which retains the original arcades and has an 18th-century west tower built for Sir John Danvers. It includes monuments to Agnes Scott, Sir John Danvers (actually installed on Danvers's instruction six years before his death) and five of his children. The churchyard of St. Leonard's includes the tomb of Sir Joseph Danvers, 1st Baronet (1686–1753), which was built half inside the graveyard and half outside (on Danvers' estate) to allow his favourite dog to be buried with him (the dog being buried on unconsecrated ground).

Swithland was designated a conservation area in 1993, and includes 31 listed buildings, including the Grade I Mountsorrel Cross, and several Grade II buildings, including the school, which was built in 1843, and a cottage from 1842. The village pub, the Griffin Inn, originally the Griffin Hotel, was built about 1700 and has been put to several uses in its history, including a brewery, bakery, and village mortuary. Most recently, it has had the inclusion of local producer Deli sourcing 80% of their products from within 40 miles. An annual village fair was held in Victorian times outside the pub on the Feast of St Leonard in November.

=== Swithland Estate ===
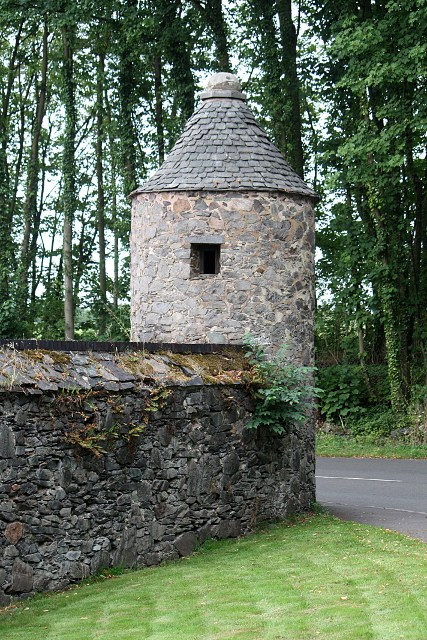
Boundary tower from the original Swithland Hall site

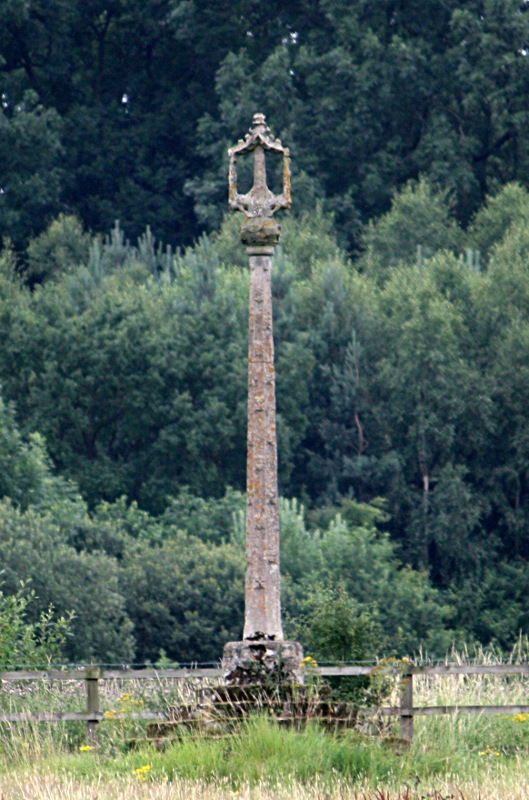
The c.1500 Mountsorrel Cross that was moved to Swithland in the 18th century

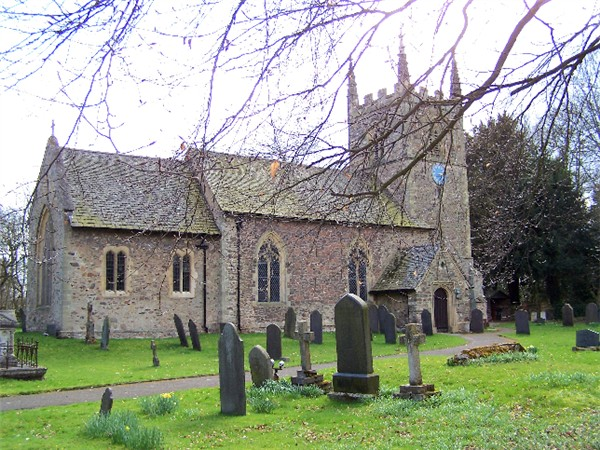
St Leonard's church, Swithland

The Swithland Hall estate was held by the family of Danvers until 1796 but after the death of Sir John Danvers (the last male of his line) it passed to his son-in-law, Augustus Richard Butler, second son of the second Earl of Lanesborough, who adopted the surname of Danvers-Butler and afterwards inherited the title of Earl of Lanesborough.

The original Swithland Hall, which stood at the eastern end of the village as it is today, on the site now occupied by Hall Farm, was destroyed by fire in 1822, although part of the hall's boundary wall, including two towers are still in existence, both of which are in Main Street. The current hall, a Grade II listed building, was partially completed in 1834 and finished in 1852, on a different site to the south-east, in what was then known as Swithland Park, by John George Danvers Butler, sixth Earl of Lanesborough. The estate includes the Mountsorrel Cross that originally stood in Mountsorrel that dates from about 1500 and was moved to its current location in Swithland Park in 1793 by Sir John Danvers, who replaced it with the Buttermarket Cross that still stands there.

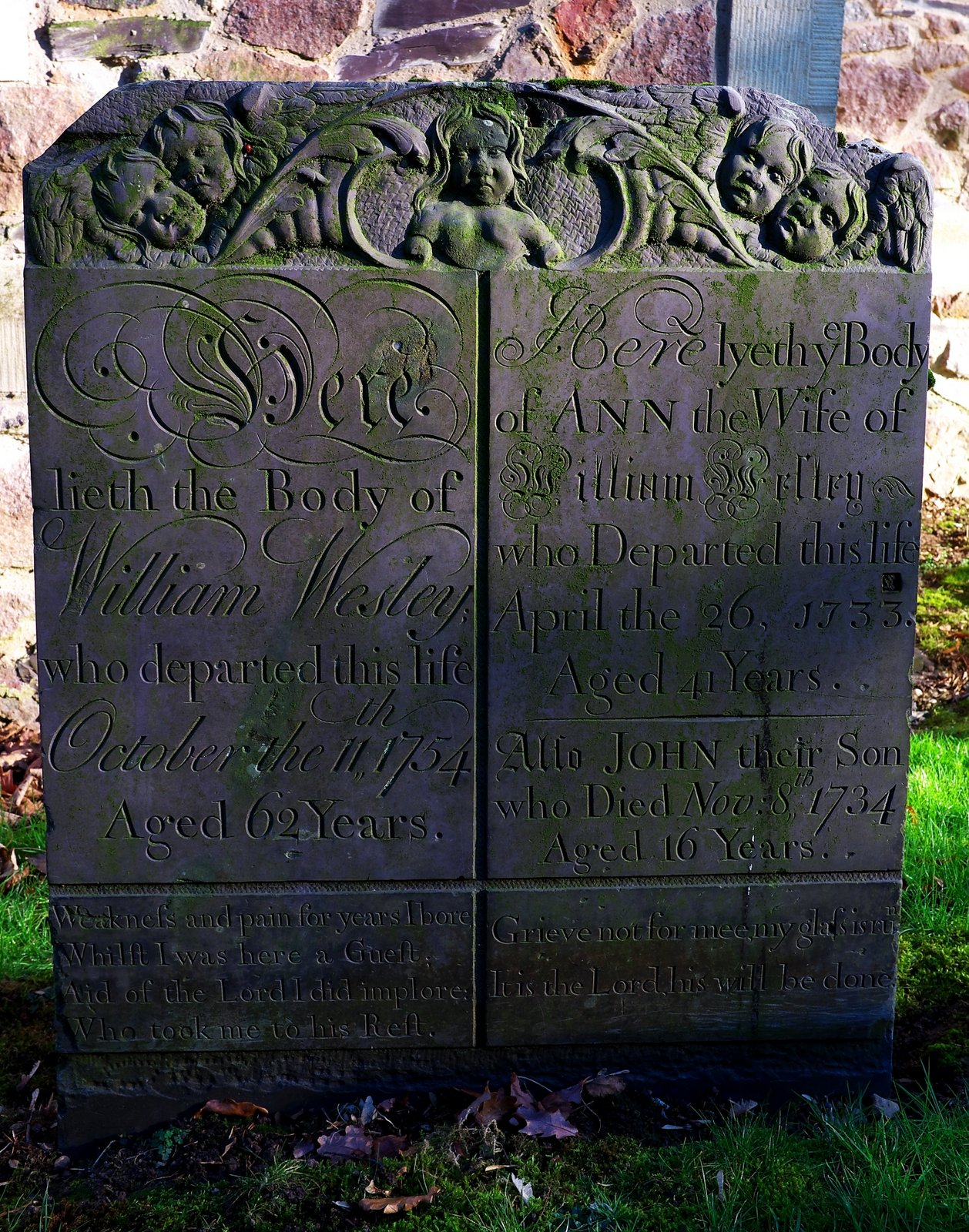
Swithland slate gravestone, Swithland churchyard

== Industry ==
Slate quarrying in the area dates back to Roman times, and was an important activity within the village between the 13th and 19th centuries. Until the mid-19th century, Swithland slate was much in demand for roofing. From the later 17th century until well into the 19th century, slate from Swithland was widely used for gravestones in Leicestershire and neighbouring counties, especially Nottinghamshire. The slate has a poorer cleavage than Welsh slate, but is often exquisitely carved. A distinguishing mark of Swithland slate is the rough texture of the uncarved face. Some gravestones were carved by members of the Hind family of Swithland, but many others were carved by masons elsewhere, to whom the raw slate was sent. One gravestone type found mainly in a group of villages in the Vale of Belvoir is called a "Belvoir Angel". Slates from Swithland for roofing were once commonly used, but demand fell in favour of slates from Wales, which were thinner and lighter.

Since then the quarry has reverted to nature, with the slate pits now flooded and sometimes used by divers. A memorial stone stands in the centre of the village.

The land to the north and south of the village is used for farming, both arable and dairy. Swithland Spring Water, based at Hall Farm, sells locally bottled spring water, which is collected from a spring beneath the farm.

== Local attractions ==
Swithland Reservoir, completed in 1896, is the largest reservoir in Charnwood; it is situated to the north-east of the village. It is accessible via the causeway road to the east of the village and with a dam that can be reached by Kinchley Lane from Mountsorrel, and is a popular site for birdwatching, as well as for walking. Swithland Wood, to the south-west of the village, is near to Bradgate Park. This large area of woodland around a former slate quarry is a popular walking, riding, and hunting spot.

== Great Central railway line ==
Towards the Rothley end of the village runs the Great Central Railway, the last main line ever built linking the north of England with London (apart from the HS2 line under construction in 2021). When the Great Central line opened on 15 March 1899, it was planned for Swithland to have its own station, the Great Central having visions of turning the area into a tourist spot. This never came into fruition, but a bricked-over stairway under the bridge of the railway provides evidence that these plans were taken into serious consideration. A small set of railway exchange sidings were built at this location, but the nearest passenger station was at Rothley.

The preserved Great Central Railway is restoring these sidings to working order. The railway line extends to Leicester North to the south, and Quorn & Woodhouse and Loughborough to the north, crossing Swithland reservoir by a two-part viaduct.
