= Grade II* listed buildings in Harborough =

There are over 20,000 Grade II* listed buildings in England. This page is a list of these buildings in Harborough, to the southeast of Leicester.

== Harborough ==
Name	Location	Type	Completed (Note: The date given is the date used by Historic England as significant for the initial building or that of an important part in the structure's description.)	Date designated	Grid ref. (Note: The grid reference is based on the British national grid reference system, sometimes known as OSGB36, used by the Ordnance Survey.) Geo-coordinates	Entry number (Note: The "List Entry Number" is a unique number assigned to each listed building and scheduled monument by Historic England.)	Image
Church of St Peter	Allexton, Harborough	Church	C12-C13	29 December 1966	SK8176200407; 52°35′43″N 0°47′40″W	1061661	Church of St Peter More images
Church of St Peter	Arnesby, Harborough	Parish Church	12th century	11 January 1955	SP6171892170; 52°31′26″N 1°05′30″W	1178306	Church of St Peter More images
Church of St Mary	Ashby Magna, Harborough	Parish Church	Late 13th century	11 January 1955	SP5637090479; 52°30′33″N 1°10′15″W	1061550	Church of St Mary More images
Church of St Peter	Ashby Parva, Harborough	Parish Church	12th century	30 September 1993	SP5256888626; 52°29′35″N 1°13′38″W	1209141	Church of St Peter More images
Church of St John the Baptist	Billesdon, Harborough	Church	13th century	29 December 1966	SK7199702538; 52°36′57″N 0°56′17″W	1360984	Church of St John the Baptist More images
School	Billesdon, Harborough	School	Reputedly 1650	29 December 1966	SK7203602553; 52°36′58″N 0°56′15″W	1074886	School More images
Church of St Mary	Bitteswell, Harborough	Church	13th century	11 January 1955	SP5373385855; 52°28′05″N 1°12′38″W	1292319	Church of St Mary More images
Church of St Nicholas	Bringhurst, Harborough	Church	C12-C15	7 December 1966	SP8412792150; 52°31′15″N 0°45′42″W	1180300	Church of St Nicholas More images
Church of St Mary	Broughton Astley, Harborough	Parish Church	Probably 13th century	11 January 1955	SP5261892655; 52°31′45″N 1°13′33″W	1061557	Church of St Mary More images
Church of St Andrew	Burton Overy, Harborough	Church	Late C13-C15	29 December 1966	SP6782998218; 52°34′39″N 1°00′02″W	1061587	Church of St Andrew More images
Carlton Curlieu Hall	Carlton Curlieu, Harborough	Country House	1636	19 October 1951	SP6955697114; 52°34′03″N 0°58′31″W	1180165	Carlton Curlieu Hall More images
Church of St Mary	Carlton Curlieu, Harborough	Church	12th century	29 December 1966	SP6936297257; 52°34′07″N 0°58′41″W	1180137	Church of St Mary More images
Church of St Thomas	Catthorpe, Harborough	Parish Church	Early 14th century	11 January 1955	SP5520578166; 52°23′55″N 1°11′24″W	1061441	Church of St Thomas More images
Church of St Mary	Cotesbach, Harborough	Cross	Late 19th century	11 January 1955	SP5389982421; 52°26′14″N 1°12′31″W	1061446	Church of St Mary More images
Cotesbach Hall	Cotesbach, Harborough	House	c. 1700	11 January 1955	SP5391082375; 52°26′12″N 1°12′30″W	1360766	Cotesbach Hall More images
Church of St Michael	Cranoe, Harborough	Parish Church	13th century	7 December 1966	SP7615395309; 52°33′01″N 0°52′42″W	1061695	Church of St Michael More images
Church of All Saints	Dunton Bassett, Harborough	Parish Church	Late C13- Early 14th century	11 January 1955	SP5475990438; 52°30′33″N 1°11′41″W	1360702	Church of All Saints More images
Church of St Peter	Church Langton, East Langton, Harborough	Parish Church	Late 13th century	7 December 1966	SP7240893414; 52°32′02″N 0°56′02″W	1061497	Church of St Peter More images
The Old Rectory	Church Langton, East Langton, Harborough	House	1780s	21 July 1951	SP7234693331; 52°31′59″N 0°56′06″W	1061500	Upload Photo
Church of All Saints	East Norton, Harborough	Parish Church	13th century	29 December 1966	SK7829000452; 52°35′46″N 0°50′44″W	1360657	Church of All Saints More images
Church of St Nicholas	Fleckney, Harborough	Church	12th century	7 December 1966	SP6474493436; 52°32′06″N 1°02′49″W	1180219	Church of St Nicholas More images
Church of St Andrew	Foxton, Harborough	Parish Church	13th century	7 December 1966	SP6990789745; 52°30′04″N 0°58′18″W	1360775	Church of St Andrew More images
Foxton Locks, Grand Union Canal Leicester Line	Foxton, Harborough	Canal Lock	1810-12	7 December 1966	SP6914589677; 52°30′02″N 0°58′58″W	1360753	Foxton Locks, Grand Union Canal Leicester Line More images
Church of St Nicholas	Frolesworth, Harborough	Parish Church	Early 13th century	11 January 1955	SP5031590614; 52°30′40″N 1°15′36″W	1061563	Church of St Nicholas More images
Church of St Peter	Gaulby, Harborough	Church	16th century	29 December 1966	SK6949101065; 52°36′11″N 0°58′31″W	1074849	Church of St Peter More images
Church of All Saints	Gilmorton, Harborough	Parish Church	14th century	11 January 1955	SP5701587868; 52°29′09″N 1°09′43″W	1292805	Church of All Saints More images
Church of St John the Baptist	Goadby, Harborough	Church	1848	29 December 1966	SP7502498892; 52°34′58″N 0°53′39″W	1115490	Church of St John the Baptist More images
The Old Rectory	Great Bowden, Harborough	House	17th century	25 July 1952	SP7461488918; 52°29′35″N 0°54′09″W	1061278	The Old Rectory More images
Church of St Andrew	Great Easton, Harborough	Church	C12-C15	7 December 1966	SP8489193187; 52°31′48″N 0°45′00″W	1360666	Church of St Andrew More images
Church of St Cuthbert	Great Glen, Harborough	Church	14th century	26 December 1966	SP6522997772; 52°34′26″N 1°02′20″W	1061596	Church of St Cuthbert More images
Stretton Hall	Oadby, Great Glen, Harborough	Country House	1715	21 December 1984	SP6529899585; 52°35′25″N 1°02′15″W	1178302	Upload Photo
Church of St Helen	Gumley, Harborough	Parish Church	14th century	7 December 1966	SP6798990201; 52°30′20″N 0°59′59″W	1061467	Church of St Helen More images
Church of St Peter	Horninghold, Harborough	Church	C12-C13	7 December 1966	SP8069597090; 52°33′56″N 0°48′39″W	1360671	Church of St Peter More images
Church of St Catharine	Houghton on the Hill, Harborough	Church	C14-C15	29 December 1966	SK6763603303; 52°37′24″N 1°00′08″W	1295074	Church of St Catharine More images
Baggrave Hall	Hungarton, Harborough	Country House	16th century	19 October 1951	SK6986109024; 52°40′28″N 0°58′06″W	1295080	Baggrave Hall More images
Church of St John the Baptist	Hungarton, Harborough	Church	C14/C15	29 December 1966	SK6909907277; 52°39′32″N 0°58′47″W	1074823	Church of St John the Baptist More images
Ingarsby Old Hall and Chapel and Garden Wall	Hungarton, Harborough	Country House	Late 15th century	19 October 1951	SK6852205362; 52°38′30″N 0°59′20″W	1074820	Ingarsby Old Hall and Chapel and Garden Wall More images
Stableblock at Quenby Hall	Hungarton, Harborough	Courtyard	Early 17th century	21 December 1984	SK7017506431; 52°39′04″N 0°57′51″W	1074821	Upload Photo
Bosworth Hall (Husbands Bosworth)	Husbands Bosworth, Harborough	Country House	Tudor	21 July 1951	SP6472884382; 52°27′13″N 1°02′56″W	1360723	Bosworth Hall (Husbands Bosworth) More images
Chapel of St Mary	Husbands Bosworth, Harborough	Chapel	1873	18 March 1987	SP6464384407; 52°27′14″N 1°03′01″W	1187989	Chapel of St Mary
Church of All Saints	Husbands Bosworth, Harborough	Parish Church	Early 14th century	7 December 1966	SP6445284374; 52°27′13″N 1°03′11″W	1360720	Church of All Saints More images
Church of St Michael and All Angels	Illston on the Hill, Harborough	Church	C13-C15	29 December 1966	SP7067299301; 52°35′13″N 0°57′30″W	1180301	Church of St Michael and All Angels More images
Church of All Saints	Keyham, Harborough	Church	C15/C16	29 December 1966	SK6701106519; 52°39′08″N 1°00′39″W	1188270	Church of All Saints More images
Church of St Wilfrid	Kibworth Beauchamp, Harborough	Church	C13-C15	7 December 1966	SP6843494170; 52°32′28″N 0°59′33″W	1061566	Church of St Wilfrid More images
Kibworth Harcourt Mill	Kibworth Harcourt, Harborough	Windmill	1711	23 January 1986	SP6887794407; 52°32′35″N 0°59′09″W	1360710	Kibworth Harcourt Mill More images
Church of All Saints	Kimcote, Kimcote and Walton, Harborough	Parish Church	Late 13th century	11 January 1955	SP5858286536; 52°28′25″N 1°08′20″W	1180212	Church of All Saints More images
Gate Piers and Gates, Steps, Balustrade and Wall at Churchyard of St John the Baptist	King's Norton, Harborough	Balustrade	18th century	21 December 1984	SK6887400486; 52°35′52″N 0°59′05″W	1061717	Gate Piers and Gates, Steps, Balustrade and Wall at Churchyard of St John the Baptist More images
Manor House	King's Norton, Harborough	House	Mid 17th century	19 October 1951	SK6893200496; 52°35′52″N 0°59′01″W	1061719	Upload Photo
Launde Abbey	Launde, Harborough	Abbey	Early 17th century	19 October 1951	SK7973504367; 52°37′52″N 0°49′24″W	1074857	Launde Abbey More images
Launde Abbey Chapel	Launde, Harborough	House	12th century	29 December 1966	SK7975004375; 52°37′53″N 0°49′23″W	1361007	Launde Abbey Chapel More images
Church of St Peter	Leire, Harborough	Parish Church	Late 13th century	11 January 1955	SP5257090025; 52°30′20″N 1°13′37″W	1061523	Church of St Peter More images
Church of St Giles	Great Stretton, Little Stretton, Harborough	Church	C12/C13	29 December 1966	SK6572900460; 52°35′53″N 1°01′52″W	1074853	Church of St Giles More images
Church of St John the Baptist	Little Stretton, Harborough	Church	12th century	29 December 1966	SK6686100279; 52°35′46″N 1°00′52″W	1294797	Upload Photo
Church of St Michael	Loddington, Harborough	Church	Late 13th century or early 14th century	29 December 1966	SK7862402003; 52°36′36″N 0°50′25″W	1361009	Church of St Michael More images
Loddington Hall	Loddington, Harborough	Country House	Late 16th century	19 October 1951	SK7907102252; 52°36′44″N 0°50′01″W	1178021	Loddington Hall
Church of All Saints	Lowesby, Harborough	Church	13th century	29 December 1966	SK7237207471; 52°39′37″N 0°55′53″W	1295216	Church of All Saints More images
Lowesby Hall	Lowesby, Harborough	House	earlier core	19 October 1951	SK7219107550; 52°39′39″N 0°56′03″W	1178050	Lowesby Hall More images
Ladywood Works (the Offices and that part known ss B3 Unit B adjacent to the north, once occupied by Sir Frank Whittle and Power Jets Ltd)	Lutterworth, Harborough	Factory	Early C20	11 December 2006	SP5480585196; 52°27′43″N 1°11′41″W	1392641	Upload Photo
The Manor House	Lutterworth, Harborough	House	Early 18th century	11 January 1955	SP5449384546; 52°27′22″N 1°11′58″W	1292772	Upload Photo
Bridge Dale Farmhouse	Medbourne, Harborough	Farmhouse	1709	7 December 1966	SP7996492817; 52°31′39″N 0°49′22″W	1061607	Upload Photo
Church of St Giles	Medbourne, Harborough	Gate	C13-C15	7 December 1966	SP7996493067; 52°31′47″N 0°49′22″W	1294816	Church of St Giles More images
Dale Farmhouse	Medbourne, Harborough	Farmhouse	Later 17th century	7 December 1980	SP8009392957; 52°31′43″N 0°49′15″W	1294791	Upload Photo
Manor House	Medbourne, Harborough	Base Cruck House	c. 1300	7 December 1966	SP8025793035; 52°31′45″N 0°49′06″W	1061611	Manor House
Old Hall	Medbourne, Harborough	House	Mid 17th century	7 December 1966	SP8009093028; 52°31′45″N 0°49′15″W	1294798	Upload Photo
Church of St Leonard	Misterton with Walcote, Harborough	Parish Church	14th century	11 January 1955	SP5570283990; 52°27′04″N 1°10′54″W	1294954	Church of St Leonard More images
Church of St Nicholas	Mowsley, Harborough	Church	Late 13th century	7 December 1966	SP6470689072; 52°29′45″N 1°02′54″W	1061483	Church of St Nicholas More images
Stable Block at Nevill Holt Hall Preparatory School	Nevill Holt, Harborough	Swimming Pool	1919-1985	21 July 1966	SP8169493660; 52°32′05″N 0°47′49″W	1061619	Stable Block at Nevill Holt Hall Preparatory School More images
Church of St Andrew	North Kilworth, Harborough	Parish Church	13th century	11 January 1955	SP6160483192; 52°26′36″N 1°05′42″W	1360794	Church of St Andrew More images
Conservatory attached to North Kilworth House	North Kilworth, Harborough	Conservatory	1888	15 September 1987	SP6022083420; 52°26′44″N 1°06′56″W	1061421	Upload Photo
Noseley Hall	Noseley, Harborough	Country House	Elizabethan	9 October 1951	SP7383298466; 52°34′44″N 0°54′43″W	1360651	Noseley Hall More images
Church of St Andrew	Peatling Parva, Harborough	Parish Church	Earlier than perpendicular	11 January 1955	SP5888389668; 52°30′06″N 1°08′02″W	1061533	Church of St Andrew More images
Peatling Hall and Garden Walls	Peatling Parva, Harborough	Country House	Late 17th century or early 18th century	11 January 1955	SP5892689801; 52°30′11″N 1°08′00″W	1295034	Peatling Hall and Garden Walls More images
Church of St John	Rolleston, Harborough	Church	13th century	29 December 1966	SK7325400410; 52°35′48″N 0°55′12″W	1086988	Church of St John More images
Church of St Helen	Saddington, Harborough	Parish Church	13th century to 14th century	18 March 1987	SP6581591781; 52°31′12″N 1°01′53″W	1188153	Church of St Helen More images
Cross at Churchyard of All Saints	Scraptoft, Harborough	Preaching Cross	15th century	29 December 1966	SK6476705558; 52°38′38″N 1°02′39″W	1061727	Cross at Churchyard of All Saints More images
Church of St Nicholas	Shangton, Harborough	Church	C13-C15	7 December 1966	SP7153896001; 52°33′26″N 0°56′46″W	1061581	Church of St Nicholas More images
Church of All Saints	Shawell, Harborough	Parish Church	15th century	11 January 1955	SP5413879676; 52°24′45″N 1°12′20″W	1061424	Church of All Saints More images
Church of St Mary Magdalene	Shearsby, Harborough	Parish Church	Medieval	11 January 1955	SP6232490989; 52°30′48″N 1°04′59″W	1061491	Church of St Mary Magdalene More images
Church of St Thomas a Becket	Skeffington, Harborough	Church	c. 1860	29 December 1966	SK7414302632; 52°36′59″N 0°54′23″W	1360995	Church of St Thomas a Becket More images
Skeffington Hall	Skeffington, Harborough	House	c. 1530	19 October 1951	SK7418302640; 52°36′59″N 0°54′21″W	1074875	Skeffington Hall More images
Church of All Saints	Slawston, Harborough	Church	14th century	7 December 1966	SP7809094508; 52°32′34″N 0°51′00″W	1334372	Church of All Saints More images
Church of St Nicholas	South Kilworth, Harborough	Parish Church	12th century	11 January 1955	SP6043981890; 52°25′54″N 1°06′45″W	1061427	Church of St Nicholas More images
Church of St Denis	Stonton Wyville, Harborough	Church	13th century	7 December 1966	SP7354695092; 52°32′55″N 0°55′01″W	1061650	Church of St Denis More images
Church of St Mary	Stoughton, Harborough	Church	14th century	29 December 1966	SK6406302112; 52°36′47″N 1°03′19″W	1360631	Church of St Mary More images
Cross at Churchyard of St Mary	Stoughton, Harborough	Cross	14th century	29 December 1966	SK6406502088; 52°36′46″N 1°03′19″W	1061730	Cross at Churchyard of St Mary More images
Church of All Saints	Swinford, Harborough	Parish Church	Early 13th century	11 January 1955	SP5694679428; 52°24′36″N 1°09′51″W	1188455	Church of All Saints More images
Church of St Luke	Thurnby and Bushby, Harborough	Church	C12-C15	29 December 1966	SK6470503931; 52°37′45″N 1°02′44″W	1294719	Church of St Luke More images
Church of St Thomas a Becket	Tugby and Keythorpe, Harborough	Parish Church	Saxo-Norman	29 December 1966	SK7617801012; 52°36′06″N 0°52′36″W	1326673	Church of St Thomas a Becket More images
Church of St Andrew	Tur Langton, Harborough	Church	1865/6	7 December 1966	SP7136094542; 52°32′39″N 0°56′57″W	1061583	Church of St Andrew More images
Church of St Andrew	Welham, Harborough	Parish Church	Perpendicular	7 December 1966	SP7654192444; 52°31′28″N 0°52′24″W	1104871	Church of St Andrew More images
Stable Block to east of Stanford Hall	Westrill and Starmore, Harborough	Courtyard	1737	11 January 1955	SP5878579329; 52°24′32″N 1°08′14″W	1061435	Upload Photo
Church of St Mary	Willoughby Waterleys, Harborough	Parish Church	13th century	11 January 1955	SP5754092472; 52°31′38″N 1°09′12″W	1180279	Church of St Mary More images
The Old Rectory	Willoughby Waterleys, Harborough	House	c. 1740	11 January 1955	SP5752492458; 52°31′37″N 1°09′13″W	1061538	Upload Photo
Church of St Luke	Newton Harcourt, Wistow, Harborough	Church	C13/C14	29 December 1966	SP6399796713; 52°33′52″N 1°03′26″W	1061548	Church of St Luke More images
Church of St Wistan	Wistow, Harborough	Church	C12-C15	29 December 1966	SP6437095980; 52°33′28″N 1°03′07″W	1188263	Church of St Wistan More images
Wistow Hall, including Flats, and, in wing, Brown's Flat, Dairy Cottage, Laundry Cottage, Brew House, Forge Cottage	Wistow, Harborough	House	Mid C20	19 October 1951	SP6416295822; 52°33′23″N 1°03′18″W	1061546	Wistow Hall, including Flats, and, in wing, Brown's Flat, Dairy Cottage, Laundry Cottage, Brew House, Forge Cottage More images
Withcote Hall	Withcote, Harborough	Country House	Early 18th century	19 October 1951	SK7963605816; 52°38′39″N 0°49′28″W	1074844	Withcote Hall More images
Brooke House School	Market Harborough	House	c. 1708	25 July 1952	SP7315587596; 52°28′53″N 0°55′27″W	1074394	Upload Photo
Manor House Buildings	Market Harborough	Manor House	1738	25 July 1952	SP7323587403; 52°28′47″N 0°55′23″W	1074415	Upload Photo
The Old House	Little Bowden, Harborough	House	Earlier	19 September 1977	SP7417486518; 52°28′18″N 0°54′34″W	1074437	Upload Photo
The Paddocks	Market Harborough	House	18th century	25 July 1952	SP7315787523; 52°28′51″N 0°55′27″W	1361231	Upload Photo
The Rectory	Little Bowden, Harborough	Vicarage	1627	25 July 1952	SP7408086980; 52°28′33″N 0°54′39″W	1216631	Upload Photo
The Three Swans Hotel	Market Harborough	Hotel	Late 18th early 19th century	25 July 1952	SP7326187356; 52°28′45″N 0°55′22″W	1074412	The Three Swans Hotel More images
United Reformed Church	Market Harborough	Church	1844	25 July 1952	SP7321987513; 52°28′50″N 0°55′24″W	1287658	United Reformed Church More images
43 High Street	Market Harborough	Legal Office	1824	25 July 1952	SP7321987482; 52°28′49″N 0°55′24″W	1361194	Upload Photo

== See also ==
- Grade II* listed buildings in Leicestershire
- Grade I listed buildings in Leicestershire
