= Bitteswell with Bittesby =

Civil parish in Leicestershire, England

Coordinates: 52.472°N 1.222°W

- Civil parish
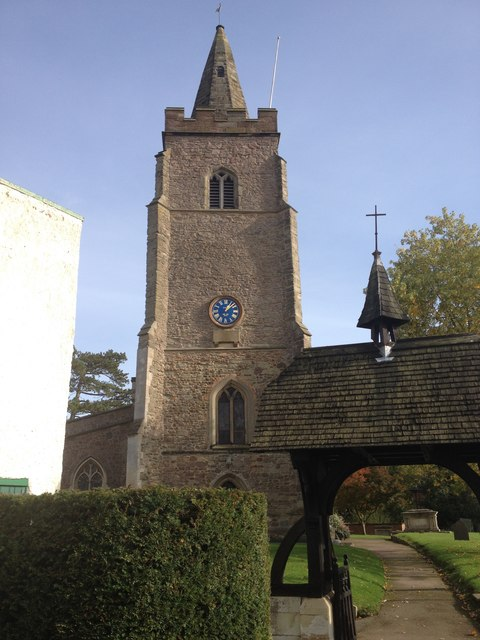
- St Mary's church, Bitteswell

- Location within Leicestershire
- Interactive map of Bitteswell with Bittesby
- Area: 4.1 sq mi (11 km^{2})
- Population: 531 (2021)
  - Density: 130/sq mi (50/km^{2})
- OS grid reference: SP 529862
  - London: 80 mi (130 km) SE
- District: Harborough
- Shire county: Leicestershire
- Region: East Midlands
- Country: England
- Sovereign state: United Kingdom
- Settlements: Bitteswell
- Post town: LUTTERWORTH
- Postcode district: LE17
- Dialling code: 01455
- Police: Leicestershire
- Fire: Leicestershire
- Ambulance: East Midlands
- UK Parliament: South Leicestershire
- Website: www.bitteswellparishcouncil.gov.uk

Bitteswell with Bittesby is a civil parish within the Harborough district, in the county of Leicestershire, England. It had a population of 531 residents in 2021. The parish is 80 miles (130 km) north west of London, 10 miles (16 km) south west of the county city of Leicester, and 1 1/3 miles (2.1 km) north west of the nearest market town of Lutterworth. On the edge of the county border, it shares a boundary with the parishes of Ashby Parva, Gilmorton, Lutterworth and Ullesthorpe in Leicestershire, as well as Wibtoft and Willey in Warwickshire.

== Geography ==
=== Location ===
==== Placement and size ====
Bitteswell with Bittesby parish is surrounded by the following local locations:

- Ashby Parva and Ullesthorpe to the north
- Lutterworth to the south
- Gilmorton to the east
- Wibtoft and Willey in Warwickshire to the west.

It is 4.10 square miles (10.62 km^{2}; 1,061.90 ha) in area, 3 1/2 miles (5.6 km) in length and 2 1/4 miles (3.6 km) in width, within the south western portion of the Harborough district, and of the county. The parish is roughly bounded by land features such as countryside with Ashby Parva and Ullesthorpe villages to the north, the A5 road to the west, the M1 motorway to the east, with the A4303 road, Lutterworth town and an unnamed stream to the south.

==== Settlements and routes ====
Despite the parish name, there is only one settlement within the parish:

- Bitteswell is to the east of the area.
- Bittesby is a deserted medieval village, 1 1/2 miles (2.4 km) west of Bitteswell

Outside of these, the parish is contains a large logistics and industrial area called Magna Park to the south. The wider area has substantial agricultural and rural areas to the west and east. There are two key routes through the parish:

- The A5 road between London and Wales forms the western perimeter of the parish on a diagonal alignment;
- The A426 road spurs off the A5 south of the parish, and passes Lutterworth and east of Bitteswell, then briefly passes through the parish boundary to the north east.

=== Environment ===
==== Landscape and hydrography ====
Primarily farming and pasture land exists throughout the parish outside the populated and industrial areas. The region is relatively level with some gradients, and few tree-rich areas, there are some patches surrounding factories and north of Bitteswell village. There is an unnamed stream forming the south eastern boundary of the parish between Bitteswell and Lutterworth. A number of springs and pools are dotted throughout the parish. The region is within the nationally defined Leicestershire Vales and the Lutterworth Lowlands landscape character area.

==== Geology ====
Much of the parish comprises bedrock made up of mudstones of the Penarth group, which is sedimentary rock formed between 209.5 and 201.3 million years ago during the Triassic period. East of Bitteswell consists of the Blue Lias Formation which is a mix of mudstone and limestone, interbedded, formed between 209.5 and 190.8 million years ago during the Triassic and Jurassic periods. West of the parish has pockets of mudstone from the Mercia Group, which is sedimentary bedrock formed between 252.2 and 201.3 million years ago during the Triassic period. There are small areas of gravel throughout. There are small superficial gravel deposits in the west and north, of the Wolston, Dunsmore and Oadby classes.

==== Land elevation ====
The parish varies relatively little in height, with the lowest points in the far west, south and surrounding Bitteswell village at 114–118 metres (374–387 ft). The industrial area is in the range 118–133 metres (387–436 ft) and it was historically used as an airbase due to this topography. The highest areas are to the far north above Bitteswell, at 140 metres (460 ft), alongside the A426 road.

== History ==
=== Toponymy ===
Bitteswell was Betmeswel at the time of the Domesday survey and meant 'the stream in the broad valley'. Bittesby was Bichesbie at the same period and stood for 'the farmstead or village at the stumpy hill'. The two areas were merged in 2014.

=== Parish and environment ===
Prehistoric findings in the region have been minimal, including pieces of flint and sherds from the Iron Age. Roman and medieval pottery during excavations are more substantial, finds at local farms include Roman brick gullies and ditches, considering it is close to the A5 route which was originally a Roman road, Watling Street. By the 8th century the Saxon kingdom of Mercia had oversight of the wider area and the parish then was part of the Guthlaxton hundred. At the time of the Norman conquest, both villages were reported upon and had different Saxon owners but 20 years later when being evidenced in the Domesday Book, these had been ceded to the new Norman masters, Bittesby held by King William directly as part of his wider holdings, with Bitteswell split between Geoffrey of la Guerche and Aubrey de Coucy as tenant-in-chiefs.

=== Bittesby ===
Bittesby was at the time of Domesday reported as having 10 villagers (villeins) and 4 smallholders (bordars). The village was passed to the family of Verdon although Nicholas de Verdon in 1216 after being involved with rebellious barons had all his lands in this county seized by King John and granted to another favoured noble, however after the kings death and a plea with his son Henry III had the lands restored. In 1257 John Verdon was granted a king's charter of free warren for all his demesne lands, including Bittlesby. By 1279, 23 villein tenants had a virgate of land each and two free tenants together with one virgate were noted in local taxation records. By the 14th century the village ownership came through the de Holland, Verdon and Furnivall families. In 1377 records showed 21 inhabitants. Through additional marriages it passed to John Talbot, 1st Earl of Shrewsbury.

A later heir, George Talbot, 4th Earl of Shrewsbury started to clear the village of the inhabitants in 1494, by this time there were 60 villagers. Reasons explained later during a public enquiry to the Exchequer stated there was only 150 acres of arable land remaining at Bittesby in 1488 and a decision made to largely enclose the land and convert it to pasture on which sheep were grazed, with suggestions that the population was in decline during the 15th century. The estate came under one pasture-farm run by a tenant farmer, the Salisbury family, these too eventually left to reside in Ullesthorpe. Evidence remains of the site to the present day, with earthworks showing hollow ways and house platforms, along with faced stonework indicative of a chapel known to have accessed by locals.

The area continued to be used over the next few centuries primarily for pastoral farming, but there are indications of some arable crops being planted, probably for the remaining workers tending to the flocks and possibly for the tenant farmer. A residual population continued to exist in the vicinity of up to 30-40 people into the 20th century, especially after a couple of houses was built in the 17th century, one of which was thought to be Bittesby House and expanded over time. During this time other landowners include Earl of Arundel, Peregrine Widdrington (brother of William Widdrington, 4th Baron Widdrington), and the Towneleys. The Leicester to Rugby section of the Midland Counties Railway was opened in 1840, it was built through the Bittesby estate and the site of the depopulated village.

The Bond family were tenant farmers at Bittesby House in the 1800s, and Charles John Bond was born at Bittesby House in 1856, he began a career in farming but changed occupations and went on to become a distinguished doctor and surgeon. Until 1866, Claybooke was an ancient parish including Bittesby, which became a standalone civil parish from that time. Bittesby Lodge was an outhouse associated to the main House and was thought to have been built in the later 19th century, close to the present A5 road. Bittesby Cottages were also built around this period, to the east. A waste processing facility was built in the 20th century to the east, with little other development locally until RAF Bitteswell was built in the 1940s.

=== RAF Bitteswell ===
RAF Bitteswell was built in 1940–41 and opened in June 1941 as a grass‑runway satellite airfield supporting RAF Bramcote during World War II. Its runways were upgraded to concrete in 1943 as training intensity increased, hosting multiple Operational Training Units involved in bomber crew preparation and beam‑approach instrument training. From 1943 a major aircraft‑assembly factory operated beside the airfield, producing and testing aircraft for Armstrong Whitworth and later Hawker Siddeley. Post‑war, Bitteswell became an important centre for aircraft maintenance, jet‑engine development, and flight testing until its closure in 1987 and Magna Park being built in its place.

=== Bitteswell ===
Being close to the Roman roads of Watling Street, Fosse Way and fort at nearby High Cross where these roads formed a crossroads within the parish, particularly at West End Farm in 2019 were findings of several Roman ditches and gullies and other artefacts such as 4th-century Roman pottery, animal bones and Roman brick. Since Doomsday and unlike its depopulated sister village. It has remained as a continuously occupied settlement since that period. St Mary's the Anglican church was built in the 12th Century church, its first vicar was Jordan in 1220 and subsequent vicars are recorded within the church until 1989. A transept in the north was added to the church in 1852 and further alterations were made in 1881-2.

By 1630, the parish of Bitteswell had 38 families resident. Dunlis House towards the western end of the village, is a half-timbered residence of which parts date from 1540, and although the majority of the property was built in the 17th-century it was extended in the early 19th-century. The Lutterworth to Ullesthorpe road along Watling Street became a turnpike by 1760, and with extensive grazing greens and springs the village became an option for travellers to stable their horses, with two inns offering accommodation. Turnpike Lodge at the western end of the village greens and Tollgate Cottage to the east both date from this period. The Inclosure Act became statute in 1773, the open field farming system ending in 1787.

In 1801 a survey showed the population of Bitteswell had increased to 69 families in 68 properties, with a total population of 398. In the next 10 years this count rose to 88 dwellings with 94 families. By 1811 agriculture remained the principal source of employment in the parish, with 61 of the 94 families engaged mainly in farm work. This period of growth coincided with the construction of several new farmhouses during the late 18th and early 19th centuries, including West End Farm, Green Farm on The Green, and Valley Farm on Valley Lane. Around 1838 a new country house, Bitteswell Hall, was constructed roughly a mile from the village. Designed as a substantial mansion, it stood within an extensive landscaped estate that included formal parkland, an ornamental lake, a fox covert, and a collection of associated farm buildings and a kitchen garden..

Reverend James Powell became vicar of St Mary's Church in 1789, and served until his death in 1844. He was married to the daughter of the tea merchant Richard Twinning. The Powells and family were locally influential, founding The Boys Free School and with several structures such as the almshouses of Powell Row built by the village greens in 1847 and the lychgate to St Mary's Church erected in 1888 in memory of Powell. A cemetery which is an extension of the churchyard of St Mary's Church was built on land which was a gift from Twinning and was consecrated in 1902. A Girls' School was opened shortly after the boys school, and both were replaced by a mixed Elementary School in 1871. A new school opened in 1888.

During the first half of the 19th century, two additional substantial residences were established within the village, each set within mature, wooded grounds. One was the Manor House on Lutterworth Road, later remodelled into a villa in 1938, and the other was Bitteswell House on Valley Lane. Following an estate sale in 1926, Bitteswell Hall was demolished in 1928. The village expanded mainly along Ashby Lane after RAF Bittesby was built. The village hall was constructed in the late 19th century as the Church reading room, It served as the village post office for a period and became the Village Hall in 1976, and was again refurbished in 2025. In 1994 the body of a sex worker murdered by Alun Kyte was found near the village. In 2014 the Bitteswell parish boundary was formally updated to include Bittesby.

=== Former railways ===
The Midland Counties Railway main line between Leicester and Rugby was opened by 1840 to the west of Bittesby, although no station was established within the parish area, and the closest being at nearby Ullesthorpe. The line operated until 1962 when the line was shut and the tracks lifted in the 1970s-1980s. A parallel branch on the former Great Central Main Line ran east of Bitteswell and briefly touched the parish boundary in the north but again no local station was built except at neighbouring Lutterworth. This line opened in 1898 and closed in 1969.

== Governance and demography ==
=== Population ===
There are 531 residents recorded within the parish for the 2021 census. Bitteswell alone reported 554 of the 2011 census. The population majority is mainly middle aged and older, with the 18-64 years age bracket taking up 54%. Infants to teenage years are another sizeable grouping of around 24%, with elderly residents (65 years and older) making up a smaller number (21%) of the parish population.

=== Labour market ===
A substantial number of 16 years old locals and above are in some way performing regular work, with 68% classed as economically active. 32% are economically inactive, and 14% are reported as retired. A majority of residents' occupations are in wholesale and retail trade; repair of motor vehicles and motor cycles, manufacturing, transport, storage and human health and social work activities.

=== Housing ===
Almost 200 residences exist throughout the parish, primarily at Bitteswell, the core settlement. The majority of housing stock is of the fully detached type, with other substantial formats including semi detached or terraced. The vast majority of these (>150) are owner occupied, with other tenure including social and private rentals.

=== Mobility ===
The majority of households (>90%) report having the use of a car or van, which is expected with a relatively isolated area with few amenities.

=== Local bodies ===
Bitteswell with Bittesby parish is managed at the first level of public administration through a parish council.

At district level, the wider area is overseen by Harborough district council. Leicestershire County Council provides the highest level strategic services locally.

== Economy ==
=== Magna Park ===
Magna Park Lutterworth occupies the former RAF Bitteswell airfield, a 550 acres (2.2 km^{2}) site purchased by Asda MFI Group plc in 1987 for large‑scale distribution development. Construction of the first phase began that year, providing 4.2 million square feet (0.39 km^{2}) of warehousing, followed by approval in 1992 for a second phase adding 3.5 million square feet (0.33 km^{2}). The estate has since expanded to about 13 million square feet (1.2 km^{2}) across 50 units used by more than 30 logistics and retail operators. Its location near major motorway corridors and other transport infrastructure supports regional and national freight movement. The development also incorporates environmental features, including the establishment of the 200 acres (0.81 km^{2}) Bittesby Country Park to enhance biodiversity and provide accessible green space.

== Community and leisure ==
=== Amenties ===
There are two public houses in the village, the Man At Arms and Old Royal Oak. Retail facilities are extremely limited; residents typically travel to Lutterworth or Rugby for shopping.

=== Recreation ===
Bittesby Country Park is set to the north of the Magna Park distribution hub, and is a wildlife and community destination comprising woodlands, meadows and wetlands. Lutterworth Country Park is adjacent to the boundary and Lutterworth. There is a village green.

=== Events ===
Regular and annual ones include a school fair, summer village fair, WI meetings, produce fair and charitable open garden activities.

== Education ==
There is a school at Bitteswell village adjacent to the church, St Mary's CofE Primary.

== Landmarks ==
=== Conservation ===
Bitteswell village has a conservation area designated around the majority of its built up area, only the newest portions to the north are not included.

==== Listed buildings ====
There are 14 listed building locations of architectural merit throughout the parish with statutory conservation status all at Grade II, comprising items such as houses, farmhouses, lodges, a public house and a K6 telephone kiosk. The 13th century built Church of St Mary is at the higher grade II*.

==== Monuments ====
The Bittesby deserted village site lies north of the A5 road and is recorded as a scheduled monument. It is made up of earthworks to the east of the former Midland Counties railway line, there are hollow ways and house platforms. A ditch is to the north of the area, near to which are signs of faced stonework for a chapel known to have been present.

=== War memorials ===
A monument is at St Mary's churchyard, commemorating locals who served in the World War I conflict.

== Religious sites ==
St Mary's Church in Bitteswell is an Anglican place of worship which dates from the 13th century, and updated and added to in the late 19th century.

== Sport ==
Lutterworth Athletic football club are based at Hall Park, they play in the Midland League Division One. Football academies and other activities such as tennis and bowls are also at the location. There are also cricket and rugby training facilities in the parish.

== Notable people ==
- Frederic Watson (1840 – 1885), English first-class cricketer and British Army officer.
- Charles John Bond (1856 –1939), doctor and surgeon
- Father Charles Roger Tennant (1919 – 2003), clergyman
- Jonnie Irwin (1973 – 2024), TV presenter
- Andy Bond (1965 –), businessman
