= List of windmills in Leicestershire =

Extant (red) and former (blue) windmills in Leicestershire.
1 Arnesby, 2 Ashby Folville, 3 Barkestone le Vale, 4 Croxton Kerrial, 5 Gilmorton, 6 Kibworth Harcourt, 7 Long Clawson, 8 Shepshed, 9 Swannington, 10 Ullesthorpe, 11 Waltham on the Wolds, 12 Wymondham

A list of windmills in Leicestershire.

Mills in bold are still standing, known building dates are indicated in bold. Text in italics denotes indicates that the information is not confirmed, but is likely to be the case stated.

== Locations ==
=== A - C ===
Location	Name of mill and grid reference	Type	Maps	First mention or built	Last mention or demise	Photograph
Arnesby	**Arnesby Mill**; SP 614 925	tower		**1815**	Windmill World	
Ashby Folville	**Ashby Mill**; **Gaddesby Mill**; SK 697 124	Tower		Early 19th century	Windmill World	
Barkestone-le-Vale	**Barkestone Mill**; SK 779 349	Tower			Windmill World	
Belgrave				1545	1558	
Billesdon				1558	1826	
Blaston				1302	1675	
Bringhurst				1629	1650	
Bringhurst					Gone by 1964	
Burrough on the Hill				1607	1614	
Burton Overy				1646	1766, gone by 1835	
Burton Overy				1766	1766, gone by 1835	
Carlton Curlieu				1592	1661	
Church Langton				1792	1792	
Cranoe				1440	1441	
Croxton Kerrial	**Croxton Mill**; SK 8372 2907	Smock		1806	Windmill World	

=== E - G ===
Location	Name of mill and grid reference	Type	Maps	First mention or built	Last mention or demise	Photograph
Evington				1308	1335	
Fleckney				1338	1338	
Foxton				Late 12th century	1317	
Foxton				1780	1885	
Galby				16th century	16th century	
Gilmorton	**Gilmorton Mill**; SP 577 883	Tower		Early 19th century	Windmill World	
Glooston				15th century	1637	
Great Bowden				1473	1690	
Great Glen				1352	1563	

=== H - K ===
Location	Name of mill and grid reference	Type	Maps	First mention or built	Last mention or demise	Photograph
Hallaton	Bardolf's Manor			1290	1588	
Hallaton	Hacluit's Manor			1373	1652	
Harby	Harby Mill; SK 738 312	Tower		Truncated during the Second World War	Windmill World	
Higham on the Hill					Windmill World	
Houghton on the Hill				1301	1301	
Houghton on the Hill	New Ingarsby					
Houghton on the Hill	Ingarsby Lane				1914, gone by 1918	
Husbands Bosworth				1252	1252	
Illston on the Hill				c. 1220	1588	
Kegworth		Post				
Kibworth Beauchamp				1315	1687	
Kibworth Harcourt	**Kibworth Harcourt Mill**; SP 689 944	Post		**1711**	Windmill World	
King's Norton				1514	1582	
Knighton	Narborough Wood Farm	Titt iron wind engine		1896		

=== L ===
Location	Name of mill and grid reference	Type	Maps	First mention or built	Last mention or demise	Photograph
Laughton				1265	1658	
Leicester	Castle Mills			1632		
Leicester	Newarke Mills			1626	1741	
Leicester	North Mills			1821	1833	
Leicester	South Fields Mill; Nurse's Mill			1316	1638	
Leicester	South Fields Mill; Nurses Mill				Standing until mid-19th century	
Leicester	Between Castle and Newarke Mills	Post	1779	1720	1779	
Leicester	St Margaret's		1779; 1828	1585	1828	
Leicester	St Margaret's (2nd mill)		1779	1779	1779	
Leicester	St Margaret's (3rd mill)		1779	1779	1779	
Leicester	London Road		1779	1779	1835	
Leicester	London Road (2nd mill)		1779	1779	1835	
Leicester	Narborough Road					
Leicester	Mount Pleasant Mill		1828	1828		
Leicester	Conduit St	tower	1826; 1828	1826	1828	
Leicester	Marston's Mill, Saxby St		1826; 1828	1826	1828	
Leicester	Whetstone's Mill, Highfield St		1826; 1828	1826	1828	
Leicester	Holmes' Mill, Mill La		1826; 1828	1826	1846	
Leicester	Freak's Ground		1828	1828	1861, gone by 1891	
Little Stretton				1314	1446	
Long Clawson	**Long Clawson Mill**; SK728 267	Tower		Early 19th century	Windmill World	
Lubenham				1624	1659	

=== M - R ===
Location	Name of mill and grid reference	Type	Maps	First mention or built	Last mention or demise	Photograph
Market Harborough	Great Bowden Mill	Smock		1839	Standing c. 1920	
Medbourne				Mid-16th century	Mid-16th century	
Medbourne		Smock		Late 18th century	Demolished January 1902	
Mowsley				1338	1338	
Narborough		Titt iron wind engine				
Nether Broughton	SK 691 258	Post			1880s OS map	
Noseley				1545	1545	
Redmile				1242	1242	
Redmile	Redmile Mill	Midlands Post		**1835**	1920s	

=== S - W ===
Location	Name of mill and grid reference	Type	Maps	First mention or built	Last mention or demise	Photograph
Shangton				c. 1304	c. 1304	
Shepshed	**Fenney Spring Mill**; SK 462 181	Tower		c. 1840	Windmill World	
Slawston				1637	1928	
Smeeton Westerby					Blown down c. 1885	
Stonton Wyville				Early 17th century	Early 17th century	
Stoughton				1341	1477	
Swannington	**Hough Mill**; SK 410 171	Tower		Late 18th century	Windmill World	
Swannington		Post			Blown down early 19th century	
Swannington		Post		Early 19th century	Demolished 1895	
Syston	Syston Mill; SK 621 109	Post			Windmill World	
Thringstone	Thringstone Windmill	tower				
Thurnby	Bushby			Early 17th century	Early 17th century	
Tur Langton	Smith's Mill; Moore's Mill			17th century	Gone by 1850	
Tur Langton	Halford's Mill			17th century	Gone by 1850	
Ullesthorpe	**Ullesthorpe Mill**; SP 506 877	Tower		**1800**	Windmill World	
Waltham on the Wolds	Waltham Mill; SK 803 248	Post			Demolished 1868	
Waltham on the Wolds	**Waltham Mill**; SK 803 248	Tower		**1868**	Windmill World	
Wistow				1436	1660	
Woodhouse Eaves	Woodhouse Eaves Mill; SK 526 143	Midlands Post		**1863**	Burnt down 1945; Windmill World	
Wymondham	**Wymondham Mill**; SK 850 192	Tower		c. 1813	Windmill World	

== Maps ==
- 1779 John Prior
- 1826 Greenwood
- 1828 Ellis
