= Knaptoft =

Medieval village in Leicestershire, England

Coordinates: 52.500719°N 1.0768025°W

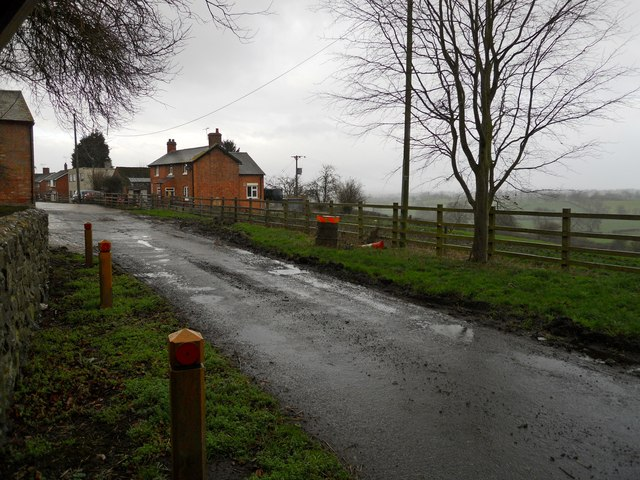
- Knaptoft (2012)

- Location within Leicestershire
- Area: 2.227809 sq mi (5.77000 km^{2})
- Population: 47 (2011)
  - Density: 21/sq mi (8.1/km^{2})
- OS grid reference: SP627896
  - London: 80.13 mi (128.96 km)
- Civil parish: Knaptoft
- District: Harborough
- Shire county: Leicestershire
- Region: East Midlands
- Country: England
- Sovereign state: United Kingdom
- Post town: LUTTERWORTH
- Postcode district: LE17
- Dialling code: 0116
- Police: Leicestershire
- Fire: Leicestershire
- Ambulance: East Midlands
- UK Parliament: South Leicestershire
- Website: Knaptoft Parish Council

Knaptoft (/ˈnæptɒft/) is a deserted medieval village and civil parish in the Harborough district of Leicestershire and lies approximately 9.7 miles (15.6 km) south of the city of Leicester, England. According to the University of Nottingham English Place-names project, the settlement name Knaptoft could mean "cnafa" (Old English) for 'a boy, a young man, a servant, a menial, or a personal name' and 'toft' (Old English), the plot of ground in which a dwelling stands. The population of the civil parish at the 2011 census was 47.

== Geography ==
Knaptoft is situated on a ridge due south of Shearsby 0.85 miles (1.37 km), between the villages of Bruntingthorpe 1.51 miles (2.43 km) to the west and Mowsley to the east 1.31 miles (2.11 km). The soils are "Slowly permeable seasonally wet slightly acid but base-rich loamy and clayey soils", according to UK Soil Observatory results. The site of the settlement is mainly situated on Till (a superficial deposit formed up to 2 million years ago in the Quaternary Period), with a strip of Lacustrine deposits on the western end that is underpinned by Dyrham Formation (grey siltstone, 183-191 million years old), with Charmouth Mudstone (105-180 million years old) to the western end of the village.

== History ==
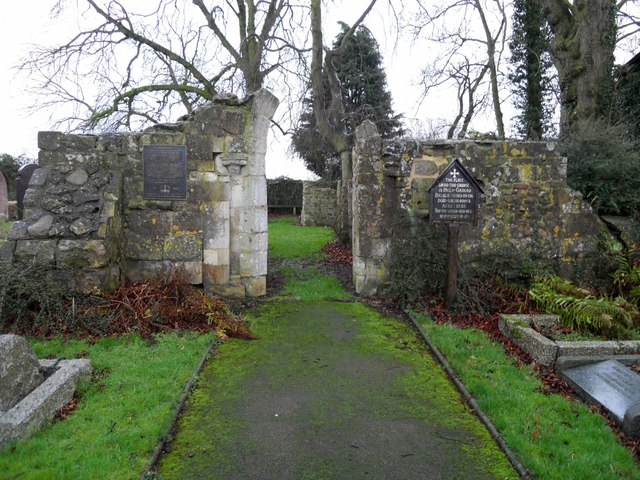
Knaptoft - Ruined Church

Mentioned in the Domesday Book Survey of 1086, Knaptoft was a settlement in the Hundred of Guthlaxton, Leicestershire. It had an estimated population of 22 households including a priest, in 1086. Evidence of activity prior to this is very slim, but a piece of Saxon pottery of 8th-9th century date was recovered by archaeologists on the site of the old manor in 2011. By 1279, the number of households increased to 32.

A survey drawn up in 1301 after the death of Richard Gobion (the lord of the manor), lists that the village had a manor, windmill, 2 fish ponds and 20 tenants. It is believed that evidence of what is possibly the mill mound has been located at the eastern end of the deserted medieval village grid reference SP 63105 89408, opposite the new Knaptoft Hall Farm complex. By 1507 the lord of the manor, William Turpin, enclosed the open fields in favour of sheep-farming. Many of the villagers were believed to have been rehoused in the neighbouring village of Shearsby. Following the death of William Turpin, in 1523, a subsidy assessment the following year listed only five labourers and the lord of the manor. A map of Warwickshire and Leicestershire, produced by Christopher Saxton as part of his Atlas of England and Wales in 1576 clearly shows Knaptoft, but no indication of the village size shown. A survey in 1624 again lists five labourers alongside a church and a manor. A visit by the printer and author John Nichols noted that five freeholders were polled in Knaptoft in 1719, and by 1775, there were none. In 1778, it was recorded that out of the 1,370 acres of parish land, 141 belonged to Thomas Turvile, esq. and the rest belonged to the Duke of Rutland, as ‘Lord of the Manor’. By 1790, the village had 7 houses but the manor Hall was now in a derelict state. The ancient parish of Knaptoft included the chapelries of Shearsby, Mowsley and the hamlet of Walton in Knaptoft, all of which became separate civil parishes in 1866. By the 1870s, the village listed 7 houses, along with 54 residents.

== Knaptoft Manor and Estate ==
Prior to 1066, Harding (son of Alnoth) was the Anglo-Saxon Lord over numerous settlements within the Guthlaxton Wapentake (Hundred) which included Knaptoft. By the time of the Domesday survey, the Earl Aubrey (of Coucy), of Norman origin, was recorded as the Lord of the estate. During the reign of Henry III, the Gobion family took lordship of the Manor up until 1300 when through marriage to Elizabeth Gobion, the Paynel family claimed lordship of the manor. A survey recorded in 1301 mentions a manor house with enclosed garden and two fish ponds. By 1417 the lordship moved to the Turpin family, again through marriage via Margaret Paynel’s daughter. It was during the time of the Turpin’s that a significant change of farming practice signalled a decline in the village population. In 1507, William Turpin enclosed the fields around Knaptoft for sheep-pasture, and most of the inhabitants were relocated. At the same time, orchards and formal gardens were developed on the grounds of the manor house, now known to be situated on the western end of the village, behind the church. Between the years 1525-1530 the manor house is believed to have been destroyed by fire, and a new Hall built in its place, by the Turpin family. Archaeological evidence reveals that the “Hall was built of red brick with stone quoins and mullions, with a slate roof.” The hall remained in the Turpin family until 1648, where it is locally believed that the Hall, along with the church, was sacked by Oliver Cromwell's Roundhead forces in June 1645 whilst in pursuit of the fleeing defeated Royalist army. After the Restoration of the monarchy in 1660, the Hall and lands were passed to the Duke of Rutland.

The printer and author, John Nichols noted in 1792, that the Hall was abandoned and was showing significant signs of decay. He went on to describe the house:

"[The old Hall] had a circular tower or bastion, of brick and stone, embattled, and was probably built by John Turpin in the reign of Henry VII and enlarged, or at least embellished, by Sir William Turpin, in the reign of either Elizabeth or James…"

Nichols returned to Knaptoft 15 years later and described the old Hall by this stage as a ruin. The remains of the Tudor Hall buildings were used for farming into the 1800s before a new farmhouse was built in 1843. In 1869, the Duke of Rutland sold the estate and a new farmhouse eventually replaced the Victorian building in 1931.

The surviving remains of the Tudor Hall were listed as a Grade II listed building in 2014 and in 2019, the farmhouse and its associated buildings were demolished to make way for new housing. All of the surviving Grade II listed structures from the old Tudor Manor were preserved and incorporated into the new buildings as testament to their historical and architectural significance.

== Church ==
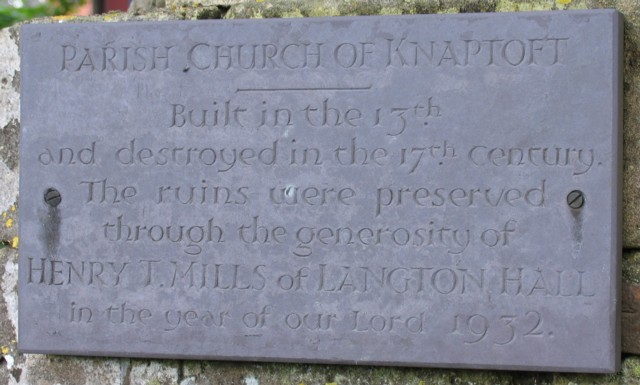
Benefactor tribute plaque (1932)

The village Church of St. Nicholas is now a ruin and is a Grade II listed building. The earliest reference to the parish church is 1143, and c.1220, Roger de Merley was the Patron of Knaptoft church. It has been recorded that the church was built in 1279 and the surviving remains of the church do appear to be of 13th century date, but work made to consolidate the remaining walls in the early 20th century has made it difficult to confirm. In 1625, the village purchased a bell for the church and in 1630 the church was noted to be still standing. It is thought, however, to have been sacked and destroyed by Oliver Cromwell's Roundhead forces after the Battle of Naseby in June 1645 whilst in pursuit of the fleeing defeated Royalist army. Evidence supports that a skirmish occurred here, based on archaeological finds. But it has been suggested that the church was already abandoned by this stage. By 1792, the church was recorded to be in ruin, with much of its fabric used to repair local roads.

== 20th century ==
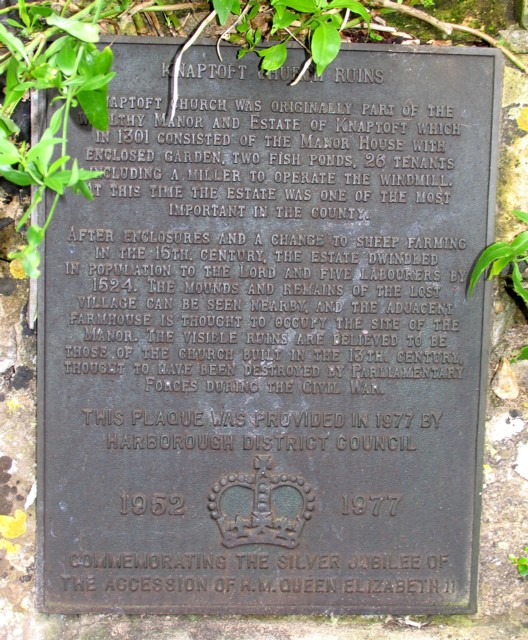
Silver Jubilee Commemoration (1977)

Renewed interest in the village manifests itself when consolidation of the church walls, as a measure to preserve the remaining structure was funded by the wealthy philanthropist and former High Sheriff of Leicestershire, Henry Truman Mills, in 1932. A few years later, research by the economic geographer and historian W. G. Hoskins, brought attention to numerous deserted medieval villages throughout Leicestershire - including Knaptoft - and encouraged research on the subject. Hoskins later became editor of ‘The Victoria County History of the County of Leicester. Volume 2’, published in 1969, which features Knaptoft (pages 194-195). In 1954, the site of the deserted medieval village (located east of the Church car park) was formally listed as a Scheduled Monument.

It is understood that the landscape historian and archaeologists John G. Hurst and Maurice W. Beresford formed the ‘Deserted Medieval Village Research Group’ while on visit to Knaptoft in 1964.

A few years later, in celebration of Queen Elizabeth II’s Silver Jubilee, a commemorative plaque of Knaptoft and its church was installed in the ruins by the Harborough District Council in 1977.

== Knaptoft today ==
Today, the Church of Saint Nicholas is a roofless ruin but still contains headstones and its stone font. Open air church services continue to be held at the church at 3pm on the third Sunday of June, July, August and September. There is a free car park next to the church that is capable of holding up to 26 cars.

The Grade II listed remains of the Old Tudor Hall can now be observed incorporated in the new housing, situated behind the Church ruins. If you walk to the end of the lane and head left down the public footpath, you will find the two original fish ponds.

Coarse fishing at the Knaptoft medieval fishponds further downhill (Knaptoft Hall Farm) are commercially open. These ponds were individually restored between 1976 and 1981, and were populated by a small number of Roach, Rudd, and Tench that were brought in from the existing medieval fishponds downhill from the new houses built on the site of the old Tudor Hall.

== Notable residents ==
- Sir George Turpin (1529–1583), was an English Member of Parliament.
- John Moore (d.1619), was an author, church minister and Parson of Knaptoft.
