= List of windmills in Nottinghamshire =

Extant windmills in Nottinghamshire.
1 Blidworth, 2 Carlton-on-Trent, 3 Caunton, 4 Coddington, 5 Eakring, 6 East Bridgford, 7 East Bridgford, 8 East Markham, 9 Elston, 10 Everton, 11 Gringley-on-the-Hill, 12 Newark on Trent, 13 North Leverton, 14 Norwell, 15 Sneinton, 16 Sutton-in-Ashfield, 17 Sutton-on-Trent, 18 Tuxford, 19 Tuxford, 20 Warsop, 21 Whatton

This is a list of all windmills and windmill sites which lie in the current ceremonial county of Nottinghamshire.

== Locations ==
=== B - C ===
| Location | Name of mill and grid reference | Type | Maps | First mention or built | Last mention or demise | Photograph |
|---|---|---|---|---|---|---|
| Balderton | | Tower | | | Standing 1934 | |
| Beckingham | | Tower | | | Standing in 1934 | |
| Besthorpe, Nottinghamshire | Besthorpe Mill; SK 883 651 | Post | | 1746 | Standing in 1946; Windmill World | |
| Blidworth | **Blidworth Mill**; SK 586 558 | Tower | | Early 19th century | Windmill World | |
| Blidworth | Roving Molly | post | | Moved to Hemswell, Lincolnshire, 1850s | | |
| Bradmore | | | | | Burnt down 5 November 1880 | |
| Carlton-on-Trent | **Carlton Mill**; SK 802 645 | Tower | | Early 19th century | Windmill World | |
| Caunton | **Caunton Mill**; SK 743 603 | Tower | | Early 19th century | Windmill World | |
| Clarborough | | | | 1828 | 1828 | |
| Coddington | **Coddington Mill**; SK 832 536 | Tower | | Late 18th century | Windmill World | |
| Cossall | | | | 1827 | 1827 | |
| Costock | | post | | | | |
| Cropwell Bishop | | | | | Blown down | |

=== E - G ===
| Location | Name of mill and grid reference | Type | Maps | First mention or built | Last mention or demise | Photograph |
|---|---|---|---|---|---|---|
| Eakring | **Eakring Mill**; SK 673 624 | Tower | | Early 19th century | Windmill World | |
| East Bridgford | **Stokes' Mill**; SK 703 443 | Tower | | **1844** | Windmill World | |
| East Bridgford | **Kneeton Hills Mill**; SK 691 430 | Tower | | **1769** | Windmill World | |
| East Farndon | | | | | Burnt down 22 August 1895 | |
| East Markham | **Cleveland Mill**; SK 730 725 | Tower | | c. 1840 | Windmill World | |
| Edwinstowe | | Post | | | | |
| Elston | **Elston Mill**; SK 760 477 | Tower | | Mid-19th century | Windmill World | |
| Everton | **Longbottom's Mill**; SK 692 904 | Tower | | c. 1830 | Windmill World | |
| Farndon | | Post | | | | |
| Farnsfield | Mansfield Road | | | | | |
| Farnsfield | Station Lane | | | | | |
| Fiskerton | Fiskerton Mill; SK 730 510 | Post | | | Windmill World | |
| Grassthorpe | | Post | | | Moved to Tuxford, 1870 | |
| Gringley-on-the-Hill | | Post | | | | |
| Gringley-on-the-Hill | **Gringley Mill**; SK 730 905 | Tower | | c. 1830 | Windmill World | |

=== H - M ===
| Location | Name of mill and grid reference | Type | Maps | First mention or built | Last mention or demise | Photograph |
|---|---|---|---|---|---|---|
| Harby | **Harby Mill**; SK 877 707 | Tower | | 19th century | Windmill World | |
| Hucknall | Sick Club Mill | Post | | | Moved in 1790 | |
| Kersall | | Post | | | Blown down November 1840 | |
| Keyworth | | Tower | | | Standing in 1934 | |
| Kimberley | West Mill; SK 488 453 | Post | | | Windmill World | |
| Kneesall | Smith's Mill | | | | | |
| Laxton | | post | | | | |
| Lenton | | Post | | | | |
| Mansfield | | | | 1822 | 1822 | |
| Mansfield | | | | 1841 | 1841 | |
| Markham Clinton | | Tower | | | Standing in 1934 | |
| Mattersey | | | | 1539 | 1539 | |
| Misterton | Misterton Mill; SK 784 944 | tower | | | Windmill World | |

=== N ===
| Location | Name of mill and grid reference | Type | Maps | First mention or built | Last mention or demise | Photograph |
|---|---|---|---|---|---|---|
| Newark-on-Trent | **Farndon Mill**; SK 780 527 | Tower | | **1823** | Windmill World | |
| Newark-on-Trent | | Post | | | Moved to Nottingham (Forest Mill #1) | |
| Newark-on-Trent | | Post | | | 1854 | |
| Newark-on-Trent | Clubber's Mill | | | 1841 | 1841 | |
| Newark-on-Trent | Winthorpe Road | | | 1823 | 1823 | |
| Newton | Shelford Mill; SK 680 422 | Post | | Early 19th century | Demolished 1952; Windmill World | |
| North Leverton | **Subscription Mill**; SK 776 820 | Tower | | **1813** | Working windmill open to the public Windmill World | |
| North Muskham | | Post | | | Standing in 1934 | |
| North Muskham | | Tower | | | Standing in 1934 | |
| North Wheatley | | Tower | | 1841 | Standing in 1934 | |
| Norwell | **Norwell Mill**; SK 774 617 | Tower | | **1852** | Windmill World | |
| Nottingham | | | | Early 13th century | Early 13th century | |
| Nottingham | Radford Mill; SK 547 409 | Post | | | Windmill World | |
| Nottingham | Forest Mill #1 | Post | | | Demolished | |
| Nottingham | Forest Mill #2 | Post | | | Moved to Brighton, Sussex | |
| Nottingham | Forest Mill #3 | Post | | | Moved to Edwinstowe | |
| Nottingham | Forest Mill #4 | Post | | 1831 | Moved to Farndon | |
| Nottingham | Forest Mill #5; Roving Molly | Post | | | Moved to Blidworth | |
| Nottingham | Forest Mill #6 | Post | | | Moved to Kegworth, Leicestershire | |
| Nottingham | Forest Mill #7 | Post | | | Moved to Lenton | |
| Nottingham | Forest Mill #8 | Post | | | Moved to Newton | |
| Nottingham | Forest Mill #9 | Post | | | Moved to Redmile, Leicestershire 1835 | |
| Nottingham | Forest Mill #10 | Post | | | Moved to Strelley | |
| Nottingham | Forest Mill #11 | Post | | | | |
| Nottingham | Forest Mill #12 | Post | | | | |
| Nottingham | Forest Mill #13 | Tower | | | | |

=== O - S ===
| Location | Name of mill and grid reference | Type | Maps | First mention or built | Last mention or demise | Photograph |
|---|---|---|---|---|---|---|
| Ossington | (two mills) | | | 1338 | 1338 | |
| Retford | Clarborough Hill | | | | Burnt down 15 January 1896 | |
| Sneinton | SK 587 398 | Post | | | Moved within Sneinton, 1807 | |
| Sneinton | **Green's Mill**; SK 587 398 | Tower | | **1807** | Windmill World; Website | |
| Sneinton | Windmill Lane Mill | Post | | **1807** | Blown down 1836 | |
| South Clifton | | | | 1814 | 1814 | |
| South Leverton | | Tower | | | Standing in 1936 | |
| South Leverton | Subscription Mill | Tower | | demolished | | |
| Southwell | | | | | Burnt down 26 November 1843 | |
| Strelley | | post | | | | |
| Sutton-in-Ashfield | Mill Street | Post | | | Blown down 1818 | |
| Sutton-in-Ashfield | **Sutton Mill**; **Lindley's Mill**; SK 500 590 | Tower | | c. 1820 | 1895; Windmill World | |
| Sutton-on-Trent | | Smock | | | Blown down July 1845 | |
| Sutton-on-Trent | **Sutton Mill**; SK 798 655 | Tower | | c. 1814 | Windmill World | |

=== T - W ===
| Location | Name of mill and grid reference | Type | Maps | First mention or built | Last mention or demise | Photograph |
|---|---|---|---|---|---|---|
| Tuxford | **Mill Mount Mill**; SK 733 718 | Tower | | 1812 | Windmill World; Website | |
| Tuxford | | Composite | | **1870** | Standing in 1936 | |
| Tuxford | **Stone End Mill**; SK 761 693 | Tower | | Mid-19th century | Windmill World | |
| Tuxford | Longbottom's Mill | | | | 1885 | |
| Upton | **Upton Mill**; SK 736 548 | Post | | | Windmill World | |
| Walkeringham | Clark's Mill | | | 1852 | | |
| Warsop | **Forest Mill**; SK 581 664 | Tower | | Early 19th century | Windmill World | |
| Whatton | **Whatton Mill**; SK 743 392 | Tower | | c. 1820 | Windmill World | |
| Winkburn | | | | 1338 | 1338 | |

=== Notes ===
Mills in bold are still standing, known building dates are indicated in bold. Text in italics denotes indicates that the information is not confirmed, but is likely to be the case stated.
