= Shersby =

Shersby is a surname. Notable people with the surname include:

- Edwin George Shersby, Sheriff of Canterbury in 1960
- Michael Shersby (1933–1997), British politician

== See also ==
- Shearsby, a village in Leicestershire, England
