= Grade II* listed buildings in Leicestershire =

Leicestershire shown within England

The county of Leicestershire is divided into eight districts: Charnwood, Melton, Harborough, Oadby and Wigston, Blaby, Hinckley and Bosworth, North West Leicestershire, and Leicester. As there are 333 Grade II* listed buildings in the county they have been split into separate lists for each district.

- Grade II* listed buildings in Melton (borough)
- Grade II* listed buildings in Charnwood (borough)
- Grade II* listed buildings in Harborough
- Grade II* listed buildings in Oadby and Wigston
- Grade II* listed buildings in Blaby (district)
- Grade II* listed buildings in Hinckley and Bosworth
- Grade II* listed buildings in North West Leicestershire
- Grade II* listed buildings in Leicester

== See also ==
- Grade I listed buildings in Leicestershire
