= Charles John Bond =

British doctor (1856–1939)

- Born: Charles John Bond; 27 October 1856; Leicester, England
- Died: 23 November 1939
- Education: Repton School, University College London

Charles John Bond CMG FRCS FLS (27 October 1856 – 23 November 1939), was a medical doctor during the nineteenth and early twentieth centuries, who served at the Leicester Royal Infirmary and was a proponent of eugenics and euthanasia.

== Early life and background ==
Charles John Bond was born on 27 October 1856 in Bittesby House, Leicestershire to George Bond, an English farmer and grazier, and Elizabeth Bond, née Higginson. Charles Bond worked on his father's farm and it was decided that he would either become a farmer or a medical doctor.

== Education and early medical career ==
Charles Bond attended Repton School and was apprenticed to Dr. C.M. Ridley in February 1875. Bond was an outdoor pupil at the Leicester Royal Infirmary and enrolled to study medicine at University College London. Bond was a contemporary of Victor Horsley and Frederick Walker Mott, both of whom had distinguished careers as medical doctors and scientists.

Bond had a distinguished medical career at University College London and he won two gold medals in physiology and anatomy and silver medals in surgery, midwifery, and medical jurisprudence. In addition to these honours, Bond also served as an assistant demonstrator in anatomy. Following the completion of his medical studies in 1879, Bond served as a house surgeon at the Bedford General Infirmary. In 1881, Bond was elected as a member of the British Medical Association.

== Leicester Royal Infirmary ==
In 1882, Bond was admitted as a Fellow of the Royal College of Surgeons of England, and he returned to the Leicester Royal Infirmary as a resident house surgeon. Working alongside Sir Charles Hayes Marriott, Bond introduced antiseptic methods of surgery at the Royal Infirmary. In 1886, Bond was promoted to the position of honorary surgeon at the Leicester Royal Infirmary.

== Proponent of eugenics and euthanasia movement ==
Charles John Bond was an active proponent of the eugenics movement and he strongly advocated that euthanasia should be legalised. Bond often conducted genetic experiments on animals in his garden and poultry yard.

Bond served as Phil. President of the Voluntary Euthanasia Legalization Committee and was also a founder member of the Sociological Society and the Eugenics Society. Bond served as a lifelong chairman of the Voluntary Euthanasia Legalization Committee.

== First World War ==
Bond was an honorary consulting surgeon to the Northern Command in 1916 and he was gazetted as a Colonel AMS. Bond represented the Medical Research Council on the inter-allied commission on the treatment of war wounds in Paris in 1916–18. In 1917, Bond was mentioned in despatches and he was awarded as a Companion of the Order of St Michael and St George for his service during the First World War.

== Personal life ==
Charles Bond married Edith Simpson, the daughter of George Simpson, the Justice of Peace of Hazlebrow, Derbyshire, and the couple had two children, Eric Bond and Margaret Bond. Eric Bond qualified as a medical doctor and Margaret Bond served as a secretary to her father. Margaret Bond became a magistrate, and would later marry her cousin, Henry 'Hal' Simpson.

== Later years ==
Bond was active in civil and political causes during his medical career and retirement. Bond served as a councillor on the Leicester city council, and he was twice elected as the president of the Leicester Literary and Philosophical Society. In 1925, Bond was given the Freedom of the city of Leicester.

Charles John Bond became a Fellow of University College London in 1924 and was elevated to a life fellowship shortly after. He was a generous benefactor to University College London and he served on the College Council of his alma mater. Bond also found time for literary pursuits and he published his memoirs in 1939. He died at Fernshaw, 10 Springfield Road, Leicester, on 23 November 1939 at the age of 83 and was survived by his wife and two children.

== Honours ==
- He was made a Fellow of the Royal College of Surgeons of England (FRCS) in 1882.
- He was a Fellow of the Linnean Society of London (FLS).
- He was awarded the Companion of the Order of St Michael and St George (CMG) in 1917.
- He received the Freedom of the City of Leicester on 28 April 1925.
- He was appointed the Honorary Colonel of the Royal Army Medical Corps North Midland Territorial Division on 21 September 1908.

== Sources ==
- Kemp, N. D. A., 'Bond, Charles John (1856–1939)', Oxford Dictionary of National Biography, Oxford University Press, 2004 Bond, Charles John (1856–1939), surgeon and advocate of voluntary euthanasia | Oxford Dictionary of National Biography
- Walker, Joan B., 'Charles John Bond of Leicester (1856–1939)', Journal of the Royal Society of Medicine, Volume 77, Number 4, (1984), pp. 316–24
