= Bittesby =

Former civil parish in Leicestershire, England

Coordinates: 52.469°N 1.265°W

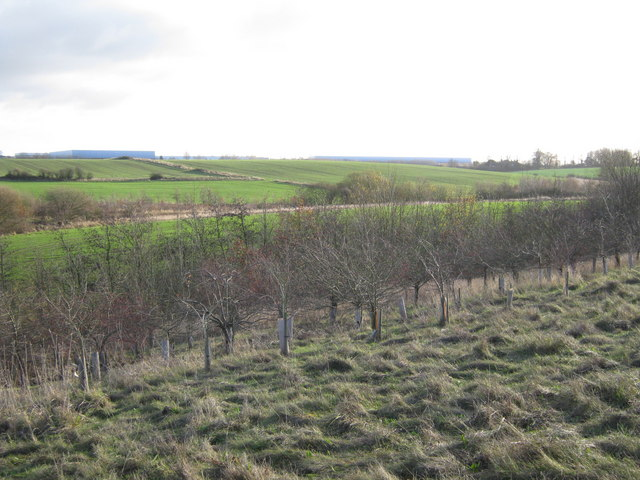
- Site of medieval village - photographed in November 2009

- Location within Leicestershire
- Civil parish: Bitteswell with Bittesby
- District: Harborough
- Shire county: Leicestershire
- Region: East Midlands
- Country: England
- Sovereign state: United Kingdom

Bittesby is a deserted village and former civil parish, now in the parish of Bitteswell with Bittesby, in the Harborough district of Leicestershire, England. It is near the A5 Watling Street, about three miles from Lutterworth. The site of the village was adjacent to the route of the now disused Midland Railway. According to the 2001 census the parish had a population of 6.

The name 'Bittesby' means 'farm/settlement of Byttel'.

Bittesby was recorded in the Domesday Book as having 25 families resident. The village was depopulated in 1494. Hollow ways and house platforms remain on the site today. To the north of the site is an area of faced stonework, indicating the site of a chapel.

The deserted medieval village of Bittesby was identified in 1945 by Maurice Beresford. It is a scheduled ancient monument.

Bittesby was formerly a liberty in Claybrooke parish, from 1866 Bittesby was a civil parish in its own right until it was abolished on 1 April 2014 and merged with Bitteswell to form "Bitteswell with Bittesby".
