= Sutton in the Elms =

Coordinates: 52.541°N 1.237°W

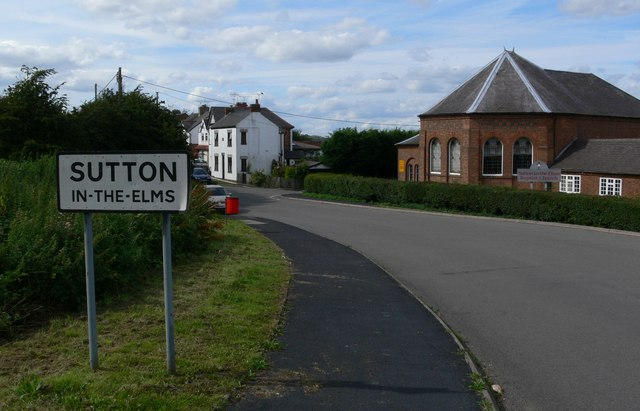
Sutton in the Elms

Sutton in the Elms is a settlement in the northwest of Broughton Astley (where the population is listed), Leicestershire. Its name is sometimes abbreviated to Sutton Elms. Sutton is one of the three settlements mentioned in Domesday that now comprise Broughton Astley: namely Broctone, Sutone and Torp.

== Geography ==
The settlement is about 9 miles (14 km) south west of the City of Leicester in the District of Harborough in Leicestershire. Sutton is one of the more desirable housing areas of Broughton Astley with homes dating from many periods. There are a number of farms, and at the West end of Sutton Lane, near the B4114 is a go-kart track. The village comprises one road, Sutton Lane, which was renamed Leicester Road until 2007 when the name reverted to Sutton Lane.

There is also Sutton in the Elms Private Care Home, a nursing care facility catering for 39 elderly residents in a homely environment, T&A Shoes (office block) and Sutton Elms Baptist Church.

In 2008 Sutton in the Elms received 15 elm trees, a gift donated by The Woodland Trust and planted along the length of the village. One tree was planted in the grounds of the Baptist church.

== History ==
Sutton in the Elms has had a Baptist church since around 1650, making it the oldest Baptist church in Leicestershire, with the current vestry being the earliest chapel building. It is still thriving today.

Sutton in the Elms also played an important part in the history of the Quakers. George Fox, founder of the Quakers, addressed his first open air meeting outside the 'steeple house' in 1647 and the Quaker Cottage at Sutton stands today.

www.suttonelms.org.uk is the privately maintained web site of Nigel and Alison Deacon, with information ranging from apples to BBC radio plays and gokart racing, nowadays archived by the British Library.
