= St Mary's Church, Broughton Astley =

Church in Broughton Astley, Leicestershire

Coordinates: 52°31′45″N 1°13′33″W

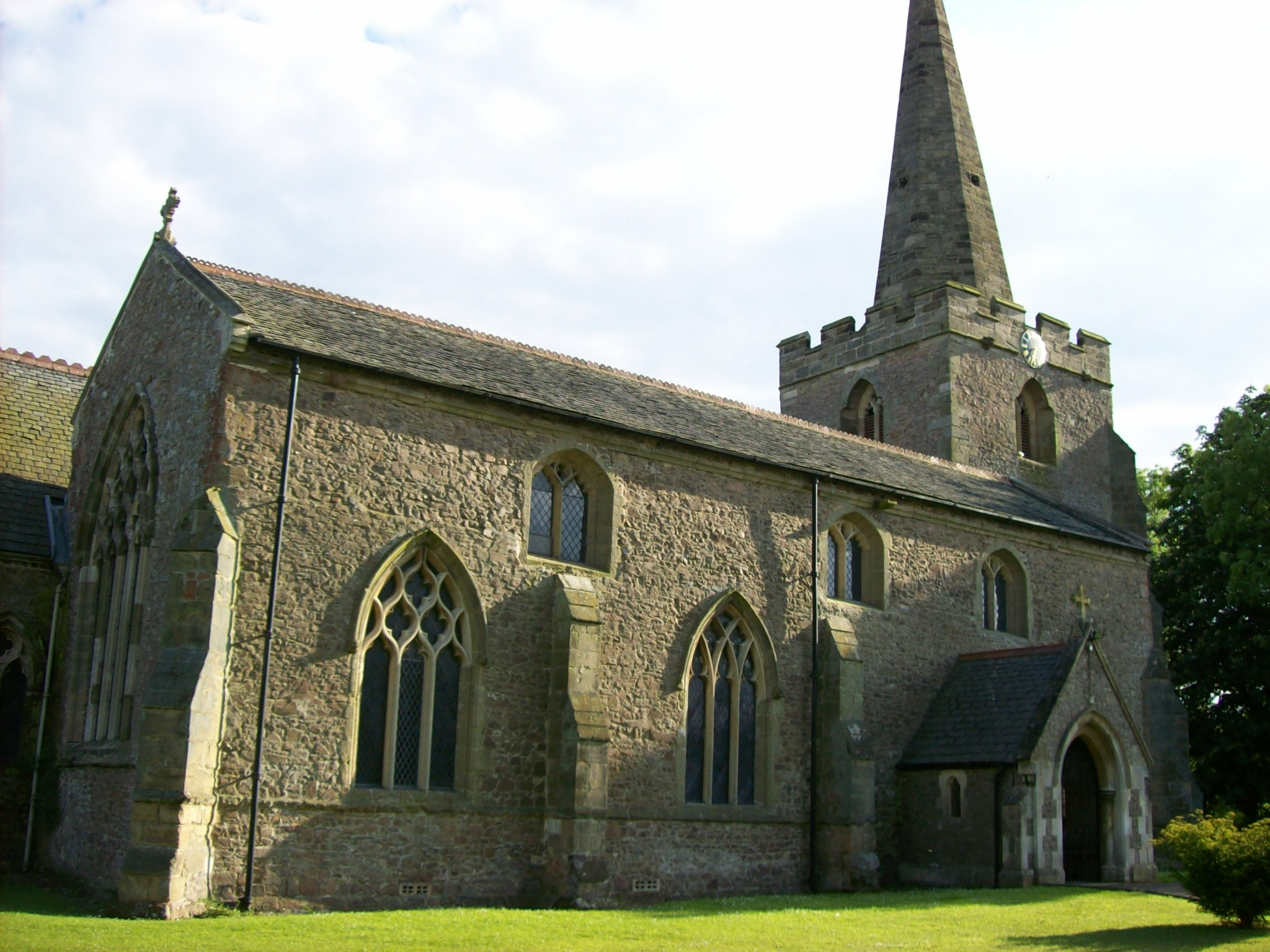
- Denomination: Church of England

History
- Dedication: St Mary

Administration
- Diocese: Leicester
- Archdeaconry: Loughborough
- Parish: Broughton Astley, Leicestershire

St Mary's Church is a church in Broughton Astley, Leicestershire. It is a Grade II* listed building.

== History ==
The church dates to 1220 but the nave walls contain evidence that there was an earlier building dating from c1100. It consists of a tower with spire, nave, chancel and north aisle.

The church was restored in 1881-82 by W. Bassett-Smith and the north porch was built in 1897. The tower used to have coats of arms for the Beauchamp, Astley and Willoughby families but these have now gone. The north aisle has a stained glass window depicting the Blessed Mary holding keys by the font. In 1900, it was reported that the Quorn hounds had pursued a fox into the church on 4 February where the congregation was in worship. The huntsman oversaw the kill in the churchyard.

By the entrance to the church is a holy water stoup. There are 8 bells in the tower, the earliest dating from 1637 and the newest from 1972.

Sir John Grey, the second cousin of Lady Jane Grey, and his mother, Lady Anne Grey, were buried in the chancel but were moved to the cemetery on Frolesworth Road.
