= Maurice Beresford =

English historian (1920–2005)

Maurice Warwick Beresford
- Born: 6 February 1920; Sutton Coldfield
- Died: 15 December 2005 (aged 85); Leeds
- Education: Bishop Vesey's Grammar School; Jesus College, Cambridge
- Occupations: historian, archaeologist

Maurice Warwick Beresford, FBA (6 February 1920 – 15 December 2005) was an English landscape and urban historian and archaeologist specialising both in the medieval period and the seventeenth and nineteenth centuries. He was Professor of Economic History at the University of Leeds.

== Early life and education ==
Beresford was born on 6 February 1920 in Sutton Coldfield, then in Warwickshire. He was the only child of Harry Bertram Beresford and Nora Elizabeth Beresford (née Jefferies). His father died in 1934, aged 46, and Maurice's mother continued to live with him until her death in 1966, aged 79.

From 1930 to 1938, Beresford was educated at Bishop Vesey's Grammar School, a state grammar school in Sutton Coldfield. While there, he was enthused by two teachers, one a history master and the other from geography. He was successful at school, becoming a prefect, school librarian and editor of the school newspaper.

Because of the premature death of his father, a university education was only possible if Beresford obtained a financially-assisted place. In 1937, Beresford sat a joint entrance exam in history for six of the University of Cambridge's colleges and was awarded an exhibition at his fifth choice, Jesus College. He matriculated in 1938. He studied for the history tripos under Bernard Manning and Charles Wilson, and took a First in part I. After doing so well, he was awarded a minor scholarship for the rest of his degree. He specialised in the medieval period for Part II, and took part in an economic history seminar run by John Saltmarsh. He passed part II and his degree with first class honours. He graduated from Cambridge with a BA in 1941, later promoted to an MA.

As an undergraduate, Beresford wrote a paper on parkland in Sutton Coldfield, the beginning of his interest in the interaction between the physical landscape and documents such as maps: this interest led to his 1957 publication, History on the Ground.

In September 1939, with the start of the Second World War, Beresford registered as a conscientious objector. As a keen connoisseur of co-incidence he found it piquant that the chairman of the tribunal was Sir John Clapham, the first Professor of Economics at the University of Leeds, and across the table sat its future first Professor of Economic History. He was exempted from military service in April 1940 on the condition that he continued his studies. After completing his degree, he undertook social work in London and Birmingham.

== Academic career ==
Beresford began his academic career not at a university but in adult education. He was Sub-Warden (1942–1943) and then Warden (1943–1948) of Percival Guildhouse, an adult education centre and charity in Rugby, Warwickshire. He continued his research, including studying the local area through RAF aerial photography and old maps to rebuild the medieval landscape. His main interests were initially in medieval field systems and the history of settlement. In 1945 he identified the deserted medieval village of Bittesby in Leicestershire. He expanded his interests from history and historical geography into landscape history and archaeology. Beresford was appointed a Lecturer at the University of Leeds in 1948. There he continued his work on deserted medieval settlements and was involved in excavations at Steeton and East Lilling in Yorkshire in 1948 and 1949.

His work on deserted settlements led to the publication of his first major work in 1954 on the 'lost villages of England', which was greeted with enthusiasm by both professional historians and local enthusiasts alike. It was republished in a revised edition in 1998. Together with John Hurst he conducted archaeological excavations at the deserted village of Wharram Percy near Malton in North Yorkshire. This work became an important impetus for medieval archaeology in Britain and Europe. More recent research can be found on the website 'Beresford's Lost Villages' to be found at dmv.wordpress.hull.ac.uk It was followed three years later, on the invitation of Professor Dom David Knowles, Regius Professor of Modern History in the University of Cambridge by his book on medieval villages, towns, landscape and industry written in association with the aerial photographs provided by his collaborator, J.S.K. St Joseph. It appeared in a second edition twenty years later.

His interest and engagement in this area continued, but he also wrote fruitfully upon the sixteenth and seventeenth centuries, including an article on the motives for enclosure published in the Festschrift for R. H. Tawney, in H. J. Fisher (editor), 'Essays in the Economic and Social History of Tudor and Stuart England' (Cambridge University Press, 1961). This article impressed Hugh Trevor-Roper, the Regius Professor of Modern History at the University of Oxford and, when he was consulted, led to Beresford's appointment as the first occupant of a new chair in at the University of Leeds in 1959. He had been promoted to Reader in 1955. At the same time, he continued his researches in medieval history, culminating in the publication of his study on town plantation in England, Wales and Gascony, the 'new towns' of the Middle Ages in 1967. His final area of research was centred on the urban history of Leeds. This led to the publication of his fourth substantial book in 1988. He held his post as Professor of Economic History at Leeds until his retirement as Emeritus Professor in 1985.

== Honours ==
Beresford was elected a Fellow of the British Academy (FBA) in 1985. In 2000, to mark his eightieth birthday, he was accorded a Festschrift in the form of a volume of the journal Northern History (vol. 37), which includes a personal tribute by his friend Ernest A. Kirkby, and a select bibliography of his books and articles 1943–2000 by Yvonne M. Fennell.

== Death ==
Beresford died in Leeds on 15 December 2005 at the age of 85.

== Bibliography ==
- Beresford, M. W. (1947). The Minute Book of a Leicestershire Enclosure. Leicester: Thornley Offprint.
- Beresford, M. W. (1951). "The Lost Villages of Yorkshire, Parts I to IV". Yorkshire Archaeological Journal. 23. Leeds: Yorkshire Archaeological Society.
- Beresford, M. W. (1951). The Lost Villages of Yorkshire, Parts I to IV Offprint from Yorkshire Archaeological Journal. Leeds: Yorkshire Archaeological Society.
- Beresford, M. W. (1951). The Lost Villages of Medieval England. London: Royal Geographical Society.
- Beresford, M. W. (1951). The Leeds Chamber of Commerce. With an Epilogue by S.J. Batchelder. Leeds: Leeds Chamber of Commerce.
- Beresford, M. W. (1954). The Lost Villages of England. London: Lutterworth Press.
- Beresford, M. W. (1958). Medieval England: An Aerial Survey. Cambridge Air Surveys, first edition. Cambridge: Cambridge University Press. ISBN 0-521-21961-2.
- Beresford, M. W. (1961). Time and Place. Leeds: Leeds University Press.
- Beresford, M. W. (1957). "The Common Informer, the Penal Statutes and Economic Regulation". Economic History Review. second. 10 (2). Glasgow: Economic History Society: 222–238. doi:10.2307/2590859. JSTOR 2590859.
- Beresford, M. W. (1957). The Common Informer, the Penal Statutes and Economic Regulation (offprint from Economic History Review). Glasgow: Economic History Society.
- Beresford, M.W. (1963). Lay Subsidies and Poll Taxes. Chichester: Phillimore.
- Beresford, M. W. (1967). Leeds and its Region. Leeds: Leeds local executive committee of the British Association for the Advancement of Science.
- Beresford, M. W. (1967). New Towns of the Middle Ages: Town Plantation in England, Wales and Gascony. London: Lutterworth Press. ISBN 0-7188-0601-8.
- Beresford, M. W.; Hurst, J. G., eds. (1971). Deserted Medieval Villages: Studies. Woking: Lutterworth Press. ISBN 0-7188-1373-1.
- Beresford, M. W. (1971). History on the Ground: Six Studies in Maps and Landscapes. London: Methuen & Co. ISBN 0-416-15130-2.
- Beresford, M. W.; Finberg, H. P. R. (1973). English Medieval Boroughs: A Hand-List. Newton Abbot: David & Charles. ISBN 0-7153-5997-5.
- Beresford, M. W. (1979). 'A Fit and Proper Home' in B.J.Barber and M. W. Beresford, The West Riding County Council 1889-1974 Historical Studies. Wakefield: West Yorkshire Metropolitan County Council. ISBN 0-86181-000-7.
- Beresford, M. W. (1979). Medieval England: An Aerial Survey. Cambridge Air Surveys, second edition. Cambridge: Cambridge University Press. ISBN 0-521-21961-2.
- Beresford, Maurice (1980). Walks Round Red Brick. Leeds University Press. ISBN 0-85316-124-0.
- Beresford, M. W. (1980). Time and Place Collected Essays. London: The Hambledon Press. ISBN 0-907628-39-7.
- Beresford, M. W. (1985). "Forty Years in the Field". The Historian. 6. London: Historical Association: 3–8.
- Beresford, M. W. (1988). East End, West End: Face of Leeds During Urbanisation, 1684–1842. Publications of the Thoresby Society. Leeds: Thoresby Society. ISBN 0-900741-23-6.
- Beresford, M. W. (1994). 'In Pursuit of the Medieval Boroughs of the West Riding of Yorkshire' in G. H. Martin and others, Doncaster A Borough and its Charters. Doncaster: The Waterdale Press. ISBN 0906976-43-X.
- Beresford, Maurice (1998). The Lost Villages of England (revised ed.). Sutton.
- Beresford, M. W. (2008). Leeds in the Seventeenth and Eighteenth Centuries (Miscellany). Leeds: Thoresby Society. ISBN 978-0-900741-66-1.

== Sources ==
- Cox, Harold (2007). "Maurice Beresford, 1920–2005". Rural History. 18: 135–136. doi:10.1017/s0956793306002056.
- Dyer, Christopher (22 December 2005). "Maurice Beresford, A historian on the trail of England's lost villages". The Guardian.
- Glasscock, Robin (14 January 2006). "Professor Maurice Beresford, Economic historian and author of 'The Lost Villages of England' who pioneered 'landscape history'". The Independent. Archived from the original on 1 April 2011.
- "Professor Maurice Beresford, Historian whose painstaking work on deserted medieval communities led to his celebrated book the Lost Villages of England". The Times. 2 January 2006.
