= Broughton Astley =

Village in Leicestershire, England

Coordinates: 52°31′40″N 1°13′39″W

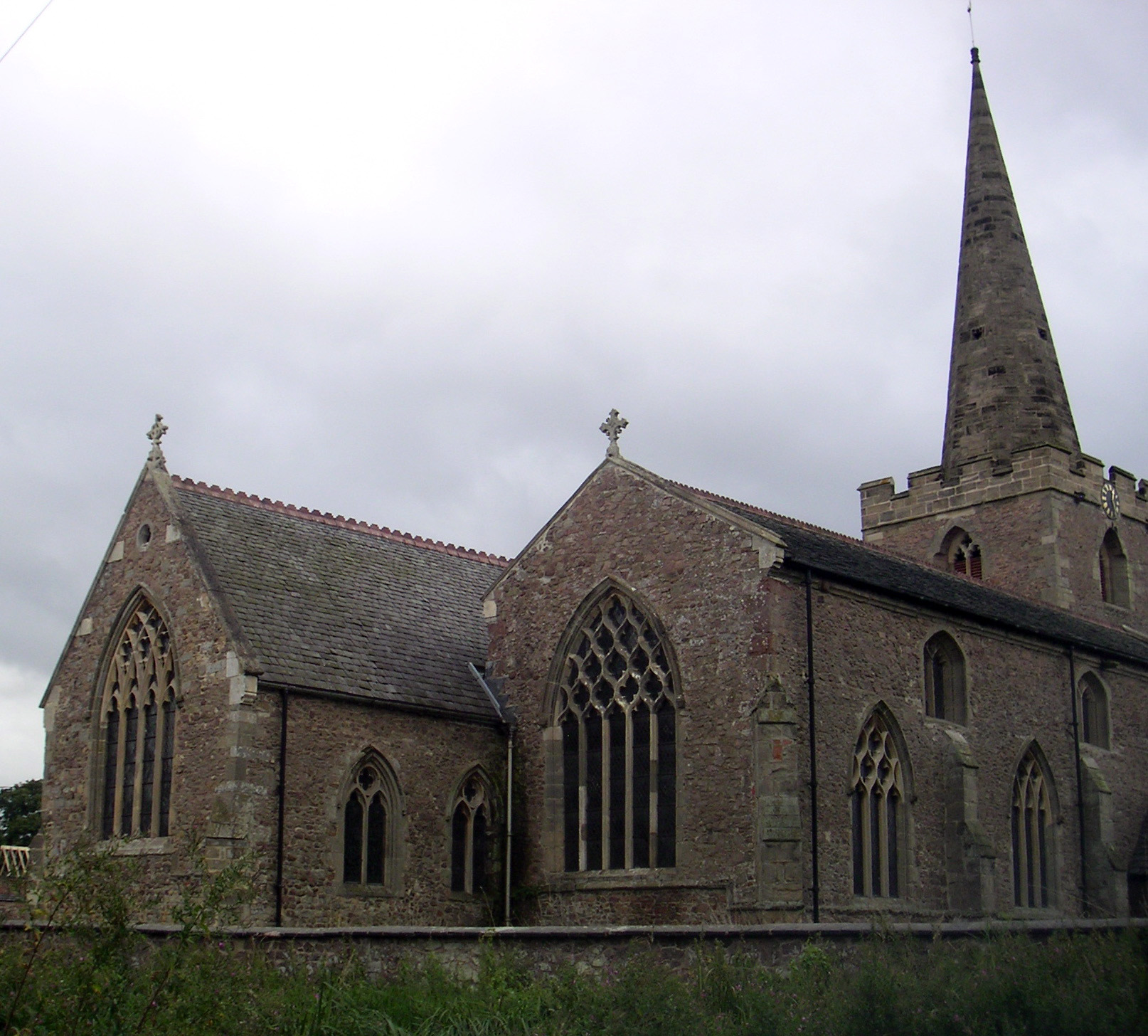
- St Mary's Church, Broughton Astley

- Location within Leicestershire
- Population: 8,940 (2011 Census)
- District: Harborough
- Shire county: Leicestershire
- Region: East Midlands
- Country: England
- Sovereign state: United Kingdom
- Post town: LEICESTER
- Postcode district: LE9
- Dialling code: 01455
- Police: Leicestershire
- Fire: Leicestershire
- Ambulance: East Midlands
- UK Parliament: South Leicestershire

Broughton Astley is a large village and civil parish located in the Harborough district of Leicestershire, England. It is situated in the south of Leicestershire, about 6 miles (10 km) east of Hinckley, about 9 miles (14 km) from the centre of Leicester, and about 14 miles from Coventry. The parish borders the Blaby district to the north, as well as sharing borders with the parishes of Cosby, Leire, and Dunton Bassett. The population of the civil parish (which includes Sutton in the Elms) at the time of the 2011 census was 8,940. A tributary of the River Soar runs through it.

== History ==
The village's name means 'farm/settlement' with a brook'. In 1220, the manor was held by Thomas de Estle. 'Estle' derived into 'Astley' which was added to distinguish from other places named Broughton.

The Parish of Broughton Astley consists of the villages of Broughton Astley and Sutton in the Elms.

Broughton Astley in turn is made up of two villages, Primethorpe and Broughton, that were previously separate. Until recently there were still signs in the old Primethorpe area that still said "Primethorpe", such as Primethorpe post office, still trading with that name decades after the two villages merged. Sutton in the Elms, although part of the parish, is separated from Broughton Astley by the B581 Broughton Way bypass, and consequently retains its own separate identity.

== Residents ==
In 1086, the combined area had under 200 inhabitants. The exact number is not known but it is probably closer to 130 than to 200. By 1800 there were about 450 people and by 1900 about 1,200. The rapid expansion after 1800 follows the development of industry, mainly machine knitting on hand-operated frames. The population census report of 1991 shows 6,487 residents. Its population is growing rapidly as a result of housing development, reaching around 10,000 at present. The population at the 2011 census was 8,940. List of the largest villages in England

== Community ==
Broughton Alive (www.broughtonalive.co.uk) is the village community organisation. It organises and runs a range of events throughout the year including the Summer Carnival, Party in the Park, the Christmas Fayre and Lights Switch On and the Santa Dash and Dawdle. Through these community events, Broughton Alive has been able to raise money for a number of local groups and organisations and has helped fund the local Community Bus.

== Education ==
Broughton Astley has three Primary Schools spread around the village. One is Orchard Primary School which is situated in the old "Primethorpe" area. The second is Old Mill Primary School situated next to Thomas Estley. The third is Hallbrook Primary School situated on the Devitt way estate and is a small school with a family feel..

Broughton is also home to Thomas Estley Community College. It hosts a wide range of night school classes and sporting activities. The community college is named after the man who first suggested combining Broughton and Primethorpe in the 18th century.

== Churches ==
St Mary's Church, Broughton Astley is the parish church, the earliest documented reference being in 1220, when it was recorded that William de Estley was rector.

Sutton in the Elms Baptist church was founded around 1650, making it the oldest Baptist church in the county.

== Employment ==
For more than a thousand years the area was agricultural. Then came the knitting/hosiery industry, after about 1750. Later still there was some brickmaking, tailoring and shoemaking. There is now a small estate for light industry, and small manufacturing businesses.

In early 1988, Puritan Maid, of THF, moved to the Cottage Lane Industrial Estate. Local people greatly disliked the frequent overnight noise from refrigerated vehicles, with numerous bitter complaints to the council. Puritan Maid was headquartered in Dunstable. By 1995, it was part of Brake Bros.

The majority of employment is now found outside the village, for example, in the Coventry, Hinckley and Leicester town areas.

== Notable residents ==
- MJK Smith, international rugby union player and England international cricket captain
- Mark Selby, international snooker player
- Willie Thorne, snooker player and commentator.
