= Frederic Watson =

English cricketer and British Army officer

Personal information
- Full name: Frederic Watson
- Born: 31 March 1819; Bitteswell, Leicestershire, England
- Died: 9 September 1885 (aged 45); Cork, Ireland
- Batting: Unknown
- Role: Wicket-keeper

Domestic team information
- Years: Team
- 1869–1874: Marylebone Cricket Club

Career statistics
Competition	First-class
Matches	12
Runs scored	222
Batting average	11.68
100s/50s	–/–
Top score	47
Catches/stumpings	7/1
- Source: Cricinfo, 17 August 2019

Frederic Watson (3 January 1840 – 9 September 1885) was an English first-class cricketer and British Army officer.

The son of T. Watson, he was born in January 1840 at Bitteswell, Leicestershire and was educated at Harrow School. From Harrow he enlisted in the British Army by purchasing the rank of ensign in the 11th Regiment of Foot in July 1859, with Watson purchasing the rank of lieutenant in July 1861. He made his debut in first-class cricket for the Gentlemen of the North against the Gentlemen of the North (?) at The Oval in 1862. He purchased the rank of captain in October 1867. In May 1869, seven years after he made his debut in first-class cricket, Watson appeared for the Marylebone Cricket Club (MCC) against Oxford University at Oxford, with Watson making five further appearances for the MCC in 1869, in addition to playing for the Gentlemen of England against Cambridge University. He made three first-class appearances in 1871, playing one match for the Gentlemen of the North and two matches for the Gentlemen of England. His final first-class match came three years later for the MCC against Cambridge University at Lord's.

He was promoted to the rank of major in May 1880, with promotion to the rank of lieutenant colonel in January 1882. Watson transferred to the West Surrey Regiment in November 1882. He died in Ireland at Cork in September 1885.
