= Ashby Parva =

Village in Leicestershire, England

Coordinates: 52.48°N 01.23°W

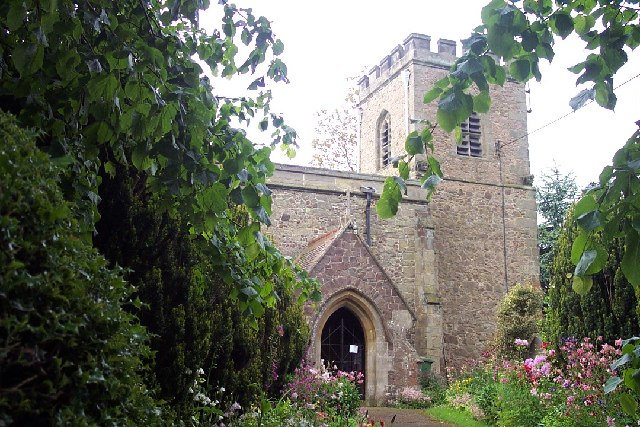
- St Peter's Church, Ashby Parva

- Location within Leicestershire
- Population: 233 (2011)
- OS grid reference: SP5288
- District: Harborough
- Shire county: Leicestershire
- Region: East Midlands
- Country: England
- Sovereign state: United Kingdom
- Post town: Lutterworth
- Postcode district: LE17
- Police: Leicestershire
- Fire: Leicestershire
- Ambulance: East Midlands
- UK Parliament: South Leicestershire

Ashby Parva is a village and civil parish in the Harborough district of Leicestershire, England. The parish had a population of 211 according to the 2001 census, increasing to 233 at the 2011 census. The village is in the west of the district, west of the M1 motorway, and nearby Ullesthorpe, Leire and Bitteswell. It is about 3 miles away from Lutterworth. The village was recorded in the Domesday Book. Ashby Parva is the home of the newly built Midlands Roller Arena, which used to host Major League Roller Hockey Europe competitions in the UK. It is the only purpose built inline hockey arena in the UK that is solely for the use of this one sport and it is used by thousands of athletes every year.

The village's name means 'farm/settlement by the ash trees'. 'Parva' is the Latin word for small.

== The Civil War ==
During the English Civil War parliamentary troops from Warwickshire garrisons visited Ashby Parva and the surrounding villages in Guthlaxton Hundred, stealing horses and availing themselves of "free quarter". In May 1642 a hundred men from the Coventry garrison stayed three hours at Ashby Parva to avail themselves of "meat, drink and provinder". In 1646 the inhabitants claimed ten pounds from the Warwickshire County Committee for a visit by Captain Wells and sixty men from Warwick in 1644, during which the troops quartered for two days and consumed "diet and horsemeat" worth an estimated ten pounds.
