= Ullesthorpe Mill =

Disused tower mill

Coordinates: 52.48488°N 1.25630°W

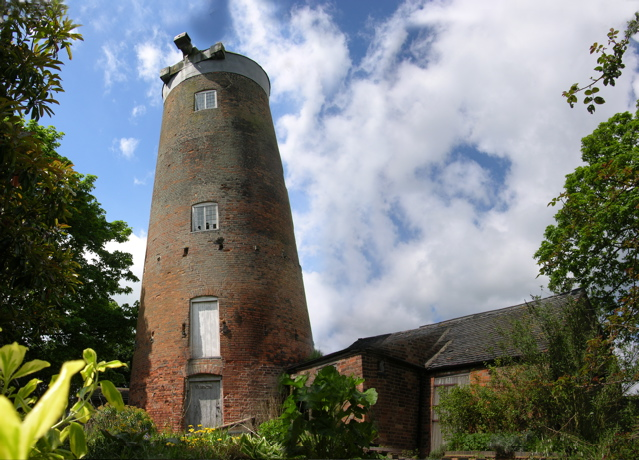
Ullesthorpe Mill.

Ullesthorpe Mill (also known as Ullesthorpe Subscription Windmill) is a disused tower mill, built in 1800 at Ullesthorpe, Leicestershire.

Members of the Ullesthorpe Preservation Trust have applied for a Heritage Lottery Fund grant to have the mill restored and turned into a small museum and local heritage centre.
