= St Nicholas' Church, Bringhurst =

Church in Bringhurst, Leicestershire

Coordinates: 52°31′15″N 0°45′42″W

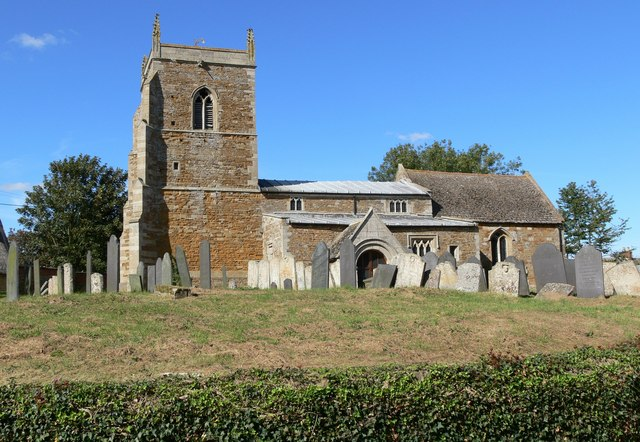
- Denomination: Church of England

History
- Dedication: St Nicholas

Administration
- Diocese: Leicester
- Archdeaconry: Leicester
- Parish: Bringhurst, Leicestershire

Clergy
- Rector: Stephen Bishop

St Nicholas' Church (Note: The 1849 Post Office Directory of Leicestershire says that the church is dedicated to St Thomas) is a church in Bringhurst, Leicestershire. It is a Grade II* listed building.

== History ==
The church is made up of a chancel, tower dating from 1180, nave, clerestory and north and south aisles. The north arcade is the oldest part of the church, dating from the late Norman period.

The bells in the tower were removed in 1970. The south aisle dates from c1200 and the chancel has been altered many times, most recently during Ewan Christian's restoration in 1862–63. The chancel has the royal coat of arms of George III dating from 1814.
