= John Hurst (archaeologist) =

British archaeologist (1927-2003)

John Hurst FSA FBA
- Born: 15 August 1927; Cambridge
- Died: 29 April 2003 (aged 75)

Academic background
- Education: Trinity College, Cambridge

Academic work
- Discipline: Archaeology
- Sub-discipline: Medieval archaeology
- Institutions: Ministry of Works

John Gilbert Hurst FSA FBA (15 August 1927 – 29 April 2003) was a British archaeologist and pioneer of the study of medieval archaeology.

== Biography ==
John Hurst was born on 15 August 1927 at Cambridge. He was educated at Harrow and then, following National Service in the Intelligence Corps in Palestine, went up to Trinity College, Cambridge to read archaeology. Although his studies at Cambridge were exclusively concerned with prehistory, his interests already lay in the medieval period, and while still an undergraduate he co-directed the excavation of Northolt Manor.

He was then appointed to the Ministry of Works as an inspector of ancient monuments in 1952. He went on to become Principal Inspector in 1973 and Assistant Chief Inspector from 1982 to 1987 when he retired, the Ministry of Works in this time having become first the Department of the Environment and then English Heritage. His principal task was in rescue archaeology, particularly in the medieval period, determining how to spend the meagre budget and this involved travelling round the country, visiting excavations and talent spotting, and many of the leading authorities in medieval archaeology owe their initial success to his support.

He is best known for his excavations at the deserted medieval village of Wharram Percy, North Yorkshire, which he excavated for 40 years, from 1950 to 1990 together with the medieval historian Professor Maurice Beresford. Wharram was notable for some of the earliest excavations of medieval peasant houses, two manor houses, and the church, and they then went on to investigate the history of the medieval village in its landscape and the causes for its desertion. The work has since been written up in 13 volumes together with a popular version published by Batsford.

Hurst was also a leading authority on medieval pottery. Early in his career, he recognised the main pottery types in East Anglia for the period 650 to 1100 and he continued to study both medieval and post-medieval pottery, both in Britain and in Europe, co-authoring a book with David Neal and H Van Beunigen on Pottery Produced and Traded in North-west Europe 1350 to 1650.

He was also notable as a founder of societies. He established with Maurice Beresford the Deserted Mediaeval Village Research Group from which sprang the Society for Medieval Archaeology founded in 1957, in which he filled almost every office, including President; he then led the formation of the Post-Medieval Ceramic Research Group which turned itself into the Society for Post-Medieval Archaeology, of which he also became president. He was elected a Fellow of the Society of Antiquaries in 1958, and was a vice president from 1969 to 1973. He was elected a Fellow of the British Academy in 1987 and was awarded an honorary doctorate by the University of York. For many years he lectured on medieval pottery at a series of seminars at Morley College in London.

== Personal life ==
Hurst married Gillian Duckett in 1955, one of the excavators at Wharram Percy. They had two daughters Francesca and Tamara. Gillian died in 1971.

Hurst retired in 1987 to Great Casterton, Rutland. On 9 March 2003 he was attacked by two men near his home with his male partner, Steve Wilson. Hurst died of pneumonia resulting from his injuries on 29 April. One of his attackers received five years for manslaughter for an "unjustified, unprovoked homophobic attack".
