= St Peter's Church, Ashby Parva =

Church in Ashby Parva, Leicestershire

Coordinates: 52°29′35″N 1°13′38″W

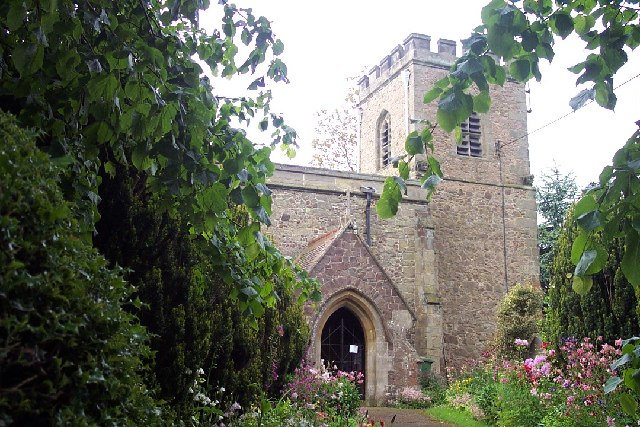
- Denomination: Church of England

History
- Dedication: St Peter

Administration
- Diocese: Leicester
- Archdeaconry: Loughborough
- Parish: Ashby Parva, Leicestershire

St Peter's Church is a church in Ashby Parva, Leicestershire. It is a Grade II* listed building.

== History ==
The church was owned by the Order of St John of Jerusalem from 1220-1556 until it passed to the Crown.

The current church dates to the 14th century but an earlier 12th century one also existed. The church is built out of rubble stone and ashlar. The porch and chancel were rebuilt in 1866 by James Piers St Aubyn.
