= Mowsley =

Village in Leicestershire, England

Coordinates: 52.47606°N 1.046667°W

- Hamlet
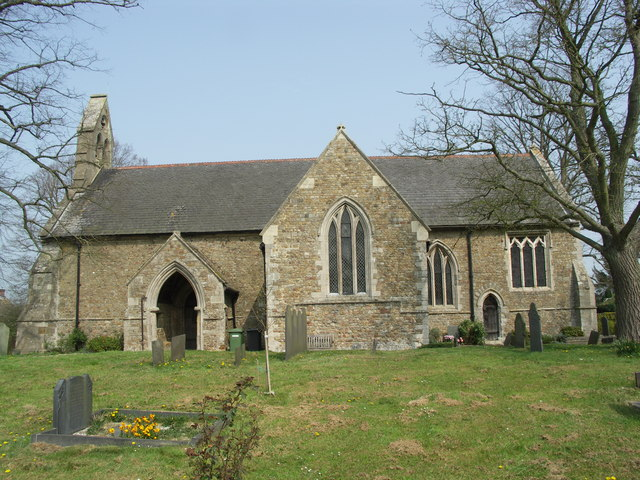
- St Nicholas Church, Mowsley

- Location within Leicestershire
- Population: 100 (2011)
- OS grid reference: SP648891
- Civil parish: Mowsley
- District: Harborough
- Shire county: Leicestershire
- Region: East Midlands
- Country: England
- Sovereign state: United Kingdom
- Post town: LUTTERWORTH
- Postcode district: LE17
- Dialling code: 0116
- Police: Leicestershire
- Fire: Leicestershire
- Ambulance: East Midlands
- UK Parliament: South Leicestershire

Mowsley (/ˈmaʊzliː/) is a small village in the south part of Leicestershire. The modern village has just under 100 dwellings. The population (including Knaptoft) at the 2011 census was 302.

== Entries in Domesday ==
According to the Domesday Book, Mowsley had two manors in 1086, situated in the ancient hundred of Gartree.

== Church and schools ==
Mowsley was a chapelry in the ancient ecclesiastical parish of Knaptoft with the chapel being built c1250AD. The chapel dedicated to St Nicholas, which was sensitively restored at the end of the 19th century, has a perfect cruciform plan and contains three piscinas, a large carved altar stone and a font which has the original bowl.

The Church of England School in Mowsley was built in 1864, but there had been a Sunday school in the village from 1833, which was attended by 17 boys and 22 girls. By 1871 there were 18 boys and 18 girls who attended the new school and in 1872 a school committee was formed who assumed responsibility for the ongoing management of the school, which had previously been the remit of the rector and the Churchwardens. A school mistress was also appointed in this year at a salary of £22 10s a year. In 1892, the cost of the general management and upkeep of the school was £64. The number of pupils two years later was just 16. In 1900 the school attendance had increased to 22, due to the closure of Laughton school and the subsequent transfer of its students to Mowsley. In 1923 it was decided that children over the age of 11 would attend the 'senior top' at Husbands Bosworth National School, however this was a fairly short lived arrangement, because the 'senior top' closed in 1930, transferring all senior pupils to Church Langton. The school in Mowsley continued as a junior school for the Mowsley and Laughton districts and in 1933 it had 35 pupils in attendance. The junior school eventually came under the jurisdiction of the local authority and by 1958, it had an attendance of 22.

== Sanatorium ==
An isolation hospital for the treatment of smallpox was built in 1903 one mile south of the village. This became a sanatorium for the treatment of Tuberculosis in 1912. In 1914-15 it was extended to a capacity of more than 70, and a chapel was added in 1923. In 1932 a new hospital was opened in Markfield and Mowsley Sanatorium was closed and demolished, the remains of the Sanatorium have been traced on the outskirts of the village on private land.

== Modern village ==
Most of the dwellings are of 19th- or 20th-century origin. The oldest property is the thatched Millstone House which may have been one of the manor houses. A restored 17th-century timber-framed house with mud lower panel and wattle and daub upper panel infills exists.

Unusually, the medieval village boundary can be clearly traced. Virtually the whole village sits within this boundary, with the village "footprint" differing little from that of 500 years ago.

The village has a pub but no shops and the village school closed in 2010.

== Families of note ==
The Brabazon family were lords of the manor in the 13th/14th centuries - eventually to become the Earls of Meath. Earthworks in the vicinity of the village represent fishponds and the remains of the Brabazon manor house.

The Barnabas Horton Family emigrated from Mowsley to the US and became one of the founding fathers of Southold, LI c. 1640. Caleb Horton (b. 1640 d.1702) was the first non-Native American child born on Long Island, in Southold.

The Popple family moved to Mowsley in the late 16th century, bringing immense wealth that transformed the village. They purchased vast amounts of land that engulfed much of the village along with the historic Brabazon Estate and invested heavily in the community to support local villagers. They revitalized agriculture with innovative techniques, provided employment, and improved living conditions by building worker cottages and funding infrastructure projects. Using their social status and influence, they attracted people and opportunities to the village, fostering growth and prosperity. In the early 20th century, their philanthropy included major contributions to the Village Church and financing the Village Hall, which became central to community life. Having sold off most of their original estate in the 20th century (predating World War 1), using it to help fund many charities assisting with post war Britain, they remained with little of the original estate left in the 1960s, which contributed vastly to urban migration in the village. Their direct descendants still reside in Mowsley, preserving the family’s enduring legacy.
