= Shearsby =

Coordinates: 52.512426°N 1.0828282°W

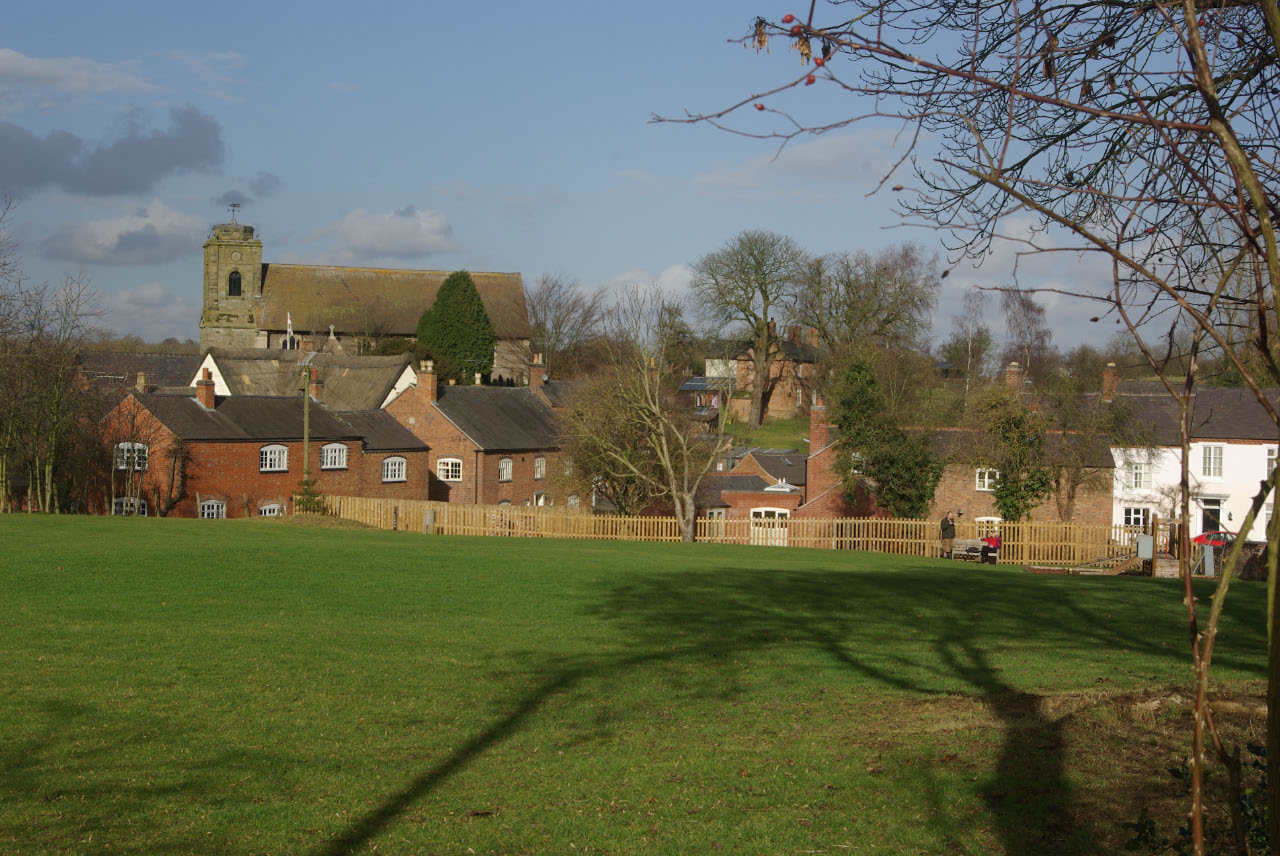
- Shearsby

- Location within Leicestershire
- Area: 1.76 sq mi (4.6 km^{2})
- Population: 240 (2011)
  - Density: 136/sq mi (53/km^{2})
- OS grid reference: SP623908
  - London: 85 mi (137 km)
- District: Harborough
- Shire county: Leicestershire
- Region: East Midlands
- Country: England
- Sovereign state: United Kingdom
- Post town: LEICESTER
- Postcode district: LE8
- Dialling code: 0116
- Police: Leicestershire
- Fire: Leicestershire
- Ambulance: East Midlands
- UK Parliament: South Leicestershire

Shearsby is a rural village in the English county of Leicestershire. Shearsby is in the Harborough district around nine miles due south of Leicester and north east of Lutterworth. The population of the civil parish at the 2011 census was 240.

== History ==
In the early 17th century the Vicar of St Mary Magdelene, and Rector of Knaptoft was John Moore, a Puritan who wrote A Mappe of Man's Mortalite in 1617 and often struggled to maintain his principles against the authorities within the Church of England. In November 1604 he was brought before the ecclesiastical court for nonconformity, refusing to wear the surplice, and summoned a further four more times in 1605. He was finally discharged by the court in 'hope of conformity'.

Shearsby Inclosure Act 1773
- Act of Parliament
- Parliament of Great Britain
- Long title: An Act for dividing and enclosing the Open and Common Fields and Common Pastures of Sheasby, in the Parish of Knaptoft, and County of Leicester.
- Citation: 13 Geo. 3. c. 81 Pr.
- Territorial extent: Great Britain

Dates
- Royal assent: 10 May 1773
- Commencement: 26 November 1772 (Note: Start of session.)

Status: Current legislation

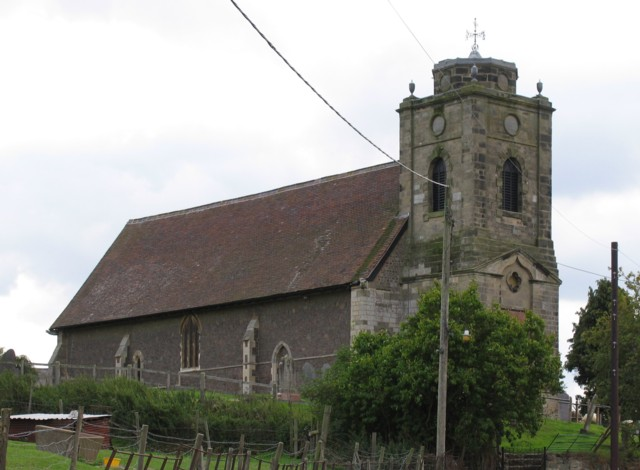
The Church of St Mary Magdelene

Not long after the Shearsby Inclosure Act 1773 (13 Geo. 3. c. 81 Pr.), it was recorded that 1,100 acres of land in and around Shearsby belonged to the lord of the manor, George Turvile, esq. It was during this time that a local printer and author, John Nichols, noted whilst visiting the church of St Mary Magdalene that four church bells were stood in the church chancel. He was to learn that one of these bells originated from the nearby ruined church of Knaptoft, and that this bell (whilst in transit to the church in Aylestone, Leicester) was appropriated from its cart by the local villagers while the Aylestone tenants (charged with transporting the bell) stopped to take a drink in the village. On realising the situation, the Aylestone tenants had to leave the village empty handed.

== Shearsby Spa ==
The Bath Hotel outside the village of Shearsby between the main Leicester-Northampton road (now the A5199) and Bruntingthorpe is the site of a holy well that was converted into a spa during the first half of the 19th century. The waters were held to be helpful in treating various ailments. Analysis of the mineral content revealed the major constituents to be sodium sulphate and sodium chloride. Treatment at the spa continued well into the late 1920s as Leicestershire's last spa. Today the 'Bath Hotel and Shearsby Spa' (SP621900) is what remains of the site.

== Buildings ==
One of the characteristics of the village is the locally hand-made bricks used to build some of the old cottages, which can be identified by their variation in size and shape. There is one Grade II* listed and 8 Grade II listed structures in Shearsby. These include: Cobblestones, Back Lane; Woodbine Cottage, Main Street; Rose Cottage, Mill Lane; and a Milepost, 500 yards north of Shearsby Road (SP624915). On Church Lane there is Bean Hill Farmhouse and garden wall, Limetree Cottage, Yeomans Cottage, Wheathill Farmhouse and Little Wheathill. The Church of St Mary Magdalene is a Grade II* Listed building.

== Sport and leisure ==
Shearsby Valley Lakes is an established coarse fishery centre which includes four lakes, a tackle shop and licensed cafe on site off Saddington Road.

Shearsby cricket: It is not known when Shearsby first took to the field, but a match report in the Leicester Chronicle show's Shearsby winning against Broughton Astley on a match dated 29 August 1870. Today, Shearsby fields an occasional Sunday friendly XI side against neighbouring village teams in and around the area.

== Links ==
- Shearsby Parish Council - History of Shearsby
- History of Shearsby
