= St Mary's Church, Bitteswell =

Church in Bitteswell, Leicestershire

Coordinates: 52°28′05″N 1°12′38″W

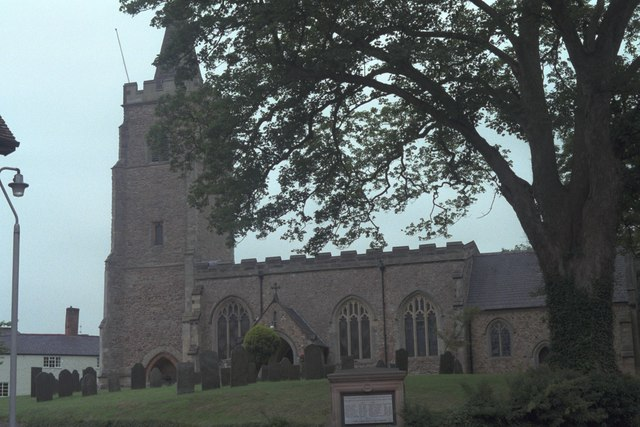
- Denomination: Church of England

History
- Dedication: St Mary

Administration
- Diocese: Leicester
- Archdeaconry: Loughborough
- Parish: Bitteswell, Leicestershire

St Mary's Church is a church in Bitteswell, Leicestershire. It is a Grade II* listed building.

== History ==
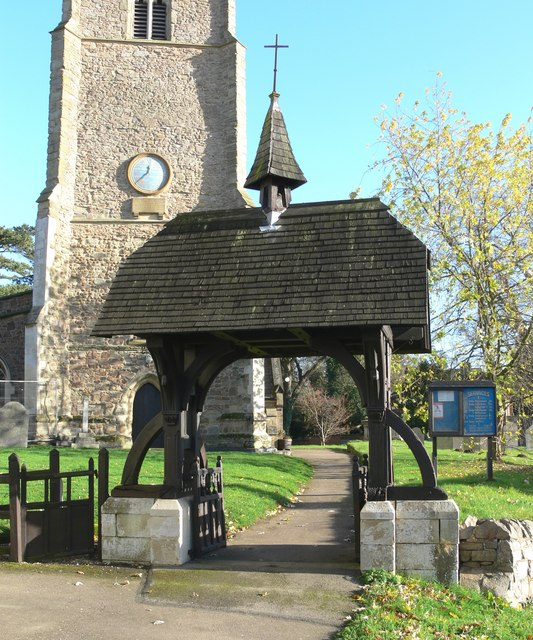
Lych gate

The church consists of a north aisle, nave, chancel and tower with spire. The oldest parts of the church date from the 14th century and are in the tower.

The church was restored by Walter F. Lyon in 1881-82 but several Norman features remain. The vestry has a Norman arch and chevron work. The current spire was added in 1894–95.

The restoration saw the clock chamber being made into the belfry and the chancel, vestry, organ chamber, porch and north aisle being added. The font dates from c1857.
