= Bringhurst =

Village in Leicestershire, England

Coordinates: 52.521°N 0.761°W

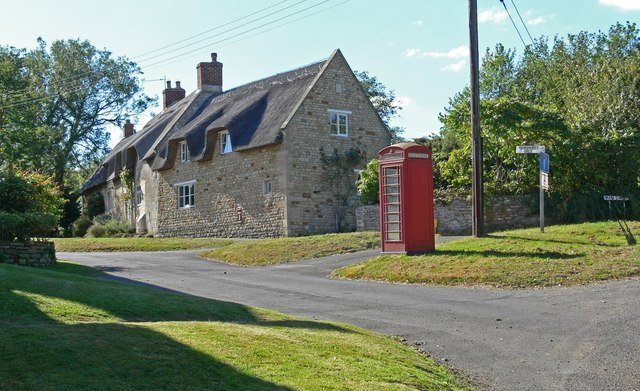
- Cottages in Bringhurst photographed in September 2007

- Location within Leicestershire
- OS grid reference: SP842921
- District: Harborough
- Shire county: Leicestershire
- Region: East Midlands
- Country: England
- Sovereign state: United Kingdom
- Post town: MARKET HARBOROUGH
- Postcode district: LE16
- Police: Leicestershire
- Fire: Leicestershire
- Ambulance: East Midlands
- UK Parliament: Rutland and Stamford

Bringhurst is a small village and civil parish in the Harborough district of south-east Leicestershire, England, bordering Northamptonshire and Rutland. Nearby places are Cottingham in Northants, Great Easton and Drayton in Leicestershire, and Caldecott in Rutland. The population is included in the civil parish of Great Easton.

== History ==
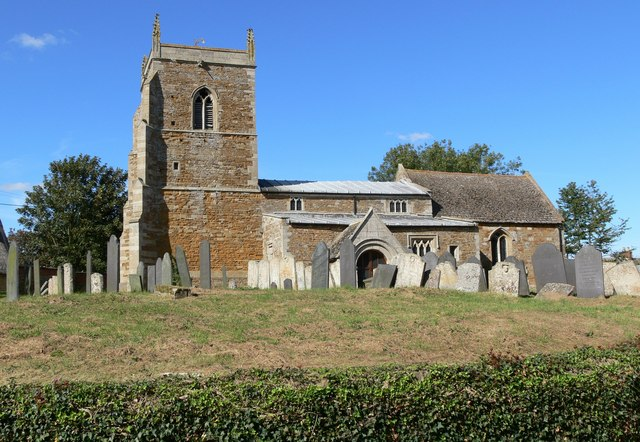
St Nicholas' Church, Bringhurst

The village antedates the Norman Conquest (1066 AD) and was one of the first Anglo-Saxon settlements of Britain. The land was given by Æthelred of Mercia to the Medeshamstede Abbey around the year 700 AD. In addition, a confirmatory charter of Edward the Confessor speaks of "the church of Bringhurst".

Bringhurst is, according to W. G. Hoskins, one of the oldest village sites of the Anglo-Saxon period in the county. Bringhurst is one of the ancient Leicestershire villages not recorded in the Domesday Book (1086); however information about it is included in the entry for Great Easton indicating that Great Easton had acquired more importance than the older village on the hill-top. By the 13th century most villages in the county were growing in population but Bringhurst, being badly sited, probably was not.

St Nicholas' Church, Bringhurst is 13th century in date; it is Grade II* listed. The older houses are made of local stone and either roofed with thatch or Collyweston slate.

== Toponymy ==
The name of the village predates its use as a family name, the earliest mention of which is dated 1260. Earlier variations of the name, such as "Bruninghurst" were first recorded in 1188. Other variations include "Bringherst", "Brinkhurst", "Bringhast", and "Bringhaste". The etymology of Bringhurst comes from the personal name "Bryni" derived from bryne (Old English), meaning "fire" or "flame", combined with the word "hurst" or hyrst meaning "wooded hill" in Old English, related to Old Saxon, and hurst or horst in Old High German.

== Primary school ==
Bringhurst Primary School is located around half a mile from Bringhurst village, by the road to Great Easton. There are 147 pupils on roll. The most recent (2012) Ofsted report stated "Bringhurst is a good school which places pupils' achievement and well-being at the centre of all it does."

The school holds a Sport England Activemark and is a Football Association Charter Standard School. The school's strengths include creative writing, music and ICT, Science and RE.

In 2010 long-standing road-safety fears were highlighted by a six-car crash outside the school gates.
