= Kibworth Harcourt Mill =

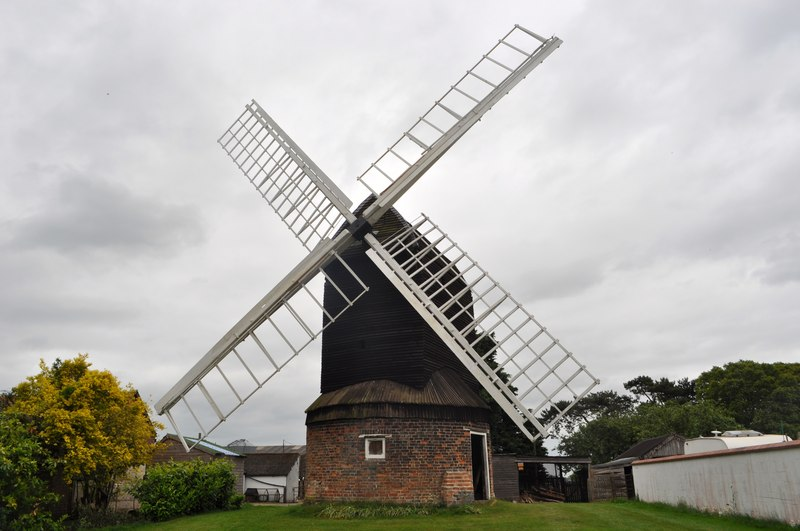
- Interactive map of the Kibworth Harcourt Mill area

General information
- Status: Grade II* listed
- Type: Post mill
- Location: Kibworth Harcourt, Leicestershire, England
- Coordinates: 52°32′35.52″N 0°59′08.92″W grid reference SP 68875 94404

Website
- www.kibworthvillage.co.uk/museum/item/67-kibworth-harcourt-windmill.html

Kibworth Harcourt Mill is a post mill in Kibworth Harcourt, Leicestershire, England. It dates from the early 18th century; it is a Grade II* listed building, and a scheduled monument. It is the only surviving post mill in Leicestershire, and is owned by the Society for the Protection of Ancient Buildings.

== History and description ==
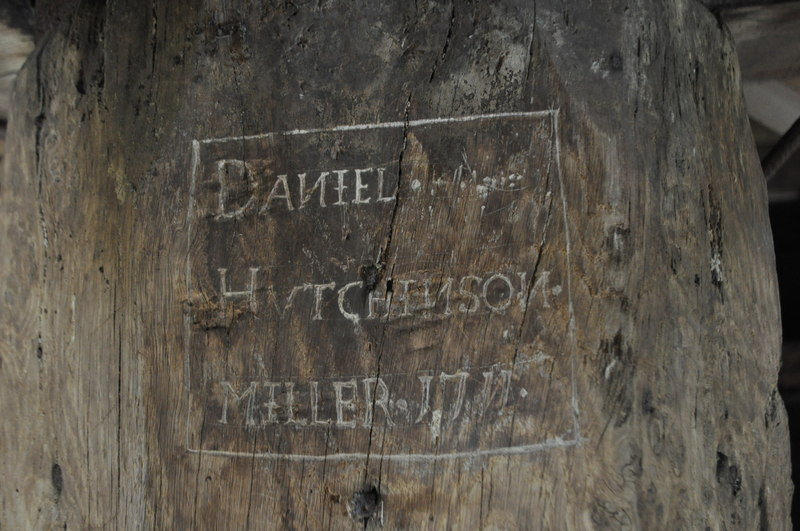
Inscription on the main post "Daniel Hutchinson, Miller, 1711"

It is the only surviving postmill from more than 200 once in use in Leicestershire.The main post of the mill is inscribed "Daniel Hutchinson, Miller, 1711". The timber-framed body of the mill has weatherboarding, and there is a brick roundhouse protecting the trestle. Inside there is wooden machinery and two sets of millstones, one of French Burr, the other of Derbyshire Peak stone.

The mill was in use until 1912, and by the 1930s it was in poor condition. The owners, Merton College, Oxford, transferred ownership of the mill in 1930 to the Society for the Protection of Ancient Buildings (SPAB), and remedial work was carried out.

=== Repairs ===
In 2017, during an inspection of the mill, one of the sails collapsed, and for safety reasons the remaining sails were removed. Major repairs were made from 2020 to 2021 by SPAB. This included repairing the oak trestle by scarfing new oak sections to the sound timber, replacing the exterior weatherboarding, and repairing the brickwork of the roundhouse with lime mortar. The machinery was repaired and new sails were fitted: two common sails and two spring sails.

SPAB commissioned Triskele Heritage to make a study of the graffiti in the mill, and this took place in May 2021. There are 264 examples, most of which are names and dates of millers and visitors. About 18% are apotropaic symbols, intended to ward off evil spirits; James Wright, the archaeologist carrying out the study, said: "These marks are significant as they show real belief in Satan and demons lasted much later than is sometimes thought." All the graffiti was preserved.

After the repairs, the mill was removed from Historic England's Heritage at Risk Register, and it was operational for the first time since the 1930s.
