= Bitteswell =

Village in Leicestershire, England

Coordinates: 52°28′05″N 1°12′42″W

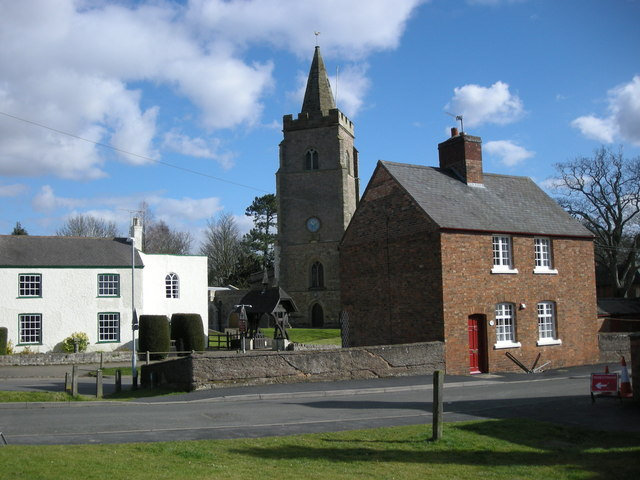

- Location within Leicestershire
- Population: 554 (2011)
- OS grid reference: SP536858
- Civil parish: Bitteswell with Bittesby
- District: Harborough
- Shire county: Leicestershire
- Region: East Midlands
- Country: England
- Sovereign state: United Kingdom
- Post town: LUTTERWORTH
- Postcode district: LE17
- Dialling code: 01455
- Police: Leicestershire
- Fire: Leicestershire
- Ambulance: East Midlands
- UK Parliament: South Leicestershire
- Website: Bitteswell Parish Council

Bitteswell is a small village and former civil parish, now in the parish of Bitteswell with Bittesby, in the Harborough district of Leicestershire in England. It is situated just north of the town of Lutterworth, and in the 2001 census had a population of 454 (including Magna Park). The population had increased to 554 at the 2011 census. It was recorded in the Domesday Book of 1086 as Betmeswelle. The village's name means 'the spring/stream in the broad valley'.

== History ==
The village contains two thatched houses and a number of Georgian dwellings alongside modern houses. Population figures have not altered much since records began in 1801 with a population of 398 was recorded as against around 380 today. In 1841 there was a big increase caused by the building of Bitteswell Hall, north of the village. This brought employment and new families as it had its own farms, gas installation etc., but in the 1920s it was demolished, the land and buildings split up. The village also had its own airfield; a RAF station called RAF Bitteswell. The construction of the grass airfield started in March 1940 and by August 1941 night flight training was able to commence using Vickers Wellington bombers. By 1943, three concrete runways were completed with connecting perimeter track and hard standings. After World War II, Hawker Siddeley built a factory next to the airfield, where Vulcan bombers (and many other aircraft) were built and maintained.

Bitteswell has a Grade II* listed Church, with 13 domestic buildings, two memorials and a village telephone box that are Grade II listed, a Church of England Primary School, and two pubs (The Man at Arms and The Olde Royal Oak).

== Sport ==
=== Cricket ===
Bitteswell Cricket Club is an English amateur cricket club, established in 1903, that is situated north of the village on Ullesthorpe Road. Bitteswell have 2 Saturday senior XI teams that compete in the Leicestershire & Rutland Cricket League, a Sunday XI team, and a junior training section that play competitive cricket in the Leicestershire Youth League.

=== Rugby ===
Lutterworth RFC was established in 1872, and their ground is situated on the northern edge of the parish boundary on Ashby Lane and they claim to be the oldest rugby union club in Leicestershire.

=== Tennis ===
Lutterworth Tennis club is based on Hall Lane and has a clubhouse with 5 tennis courts and floodlights. The club plays competitive matches in the Leicestershire and Rugby leagues for adults and juniors.

== Notable people ==
- Frederic Watson (1840–1885), cricketer
