= List of schools in Liverpool =

This is a list of schools in Liverpool in the English county of Merseyside.

== State-funded schools ==
Maintained Nursery Schools

Abercromby Nursery School

East Prescot Road Nursery School

Ellergeeen Nursery School and Children's Centre

Everton Nursery School and Family Centre

Primary Schools

- All Saints' RC Primary School
- Anfield Road Primary School
- Arnot St Mary CE Primary School
- Banks Road Primary School
- Barlows Primary School
- The Beacon CE Primary School
- Belle Vale Community Primary School
- Bishop Martin CE Primary School
- Blackmoor Park Infants' School
- Blackmoor Park Junior School
- Blessed Sacrament RC Primary School
- Blueberry Park
- Booker Avenue Infant School
- Booker Avenue Junior School
- Broad Square Community Primary School
- Broadgreen Primary School
- Childwall CE Primary School
- Childwall Valley Primary School
- Christ the King RC Primary School
- Corinthian Community Primary School
- Croxteth Community Primary School
- Dovecot Primary School
- Dovedale Primary School
- Emmaus CE/RC Primary School
- Faith Primary Academy
- Fazakerley Primary School
- Florence Melly Community Primary School
- Four Oaks Primary School
- Garston CE Primary School
- Gilmour Primary School
- Greenbank Primary School
- Gwladys Street Primary and Nursery School
- Heygreen Primary School
- Holy Cross RC Primary School
- Holy Family RC Primary School
- Holy Name RC Primary School
- Holy Trinity RC Primary School
- Hunts Cross Primary School
- Kensington Primary School
- King David Primary School
- Kingsley Community School
- Kirkdale St Lawrence CE Primary School
- Knotty Ash Primary School
- Lawrence Community Primary School
- Leamington Community Primary School
- LIPA Primary School
- Lister Infant and Nursery School
- Lister Junior School
- Liverpool College
- Longmoor Community Primary School
- Mab Lane Junior Mixed and Infant School
- Matthew Arnold Primary School
- Middlefield Community Primary School
- Monksdown Primary School
- Mosspits Lane Primary School
- Much Woolton RC Primary School
- New Park Primary School
- Norman Pannell Primary School
- Northcote Primary School
- Northway Primary and Nursery School
- Our Lady and St Philomena's RC Primary School
- Our Lady and St Swithin's RC Primary School
- Our Lady Immaculate RC Primary School
- Our Lady of Good Help RC Primary School
- Our Lady of the Assumption RC Primary School
- Our Lady's Bishop Eton RC Primary School
- Phoenix Primary School
- Pinehurst Primary School
- Pleasant Street Primary School
- Ranworth Square Primary School
- Rice Lane Primary School
- Roscoe Primary School
- Rudston Primary School
- Runnymede St Edward's RC Primary School
- Sacred Heart RC Primary School
- St Ambrose RC Academy
- St Anne's Junior Mixed and Infant School
- St Anne's RC Primary School
- St Anthony of Padua RC Primary School
- St Austin's RC Primary School
- St Cecilia's RC Infant School
- St Cecilia's RC Junior School
- St Charles' RC Primary School
- St Christopher's RC Primary School
- St Clare's RC Primary School
- St Cleopas' CE Junior Mixed and Infant School
- St Cuthbert's RC Primary and Nursery School
- St Finbar's RC Primary School
- St Francis de Sales RC Infant and Nursery School
- St Francis de Sales RC Junior School
- St Gregory's RC Primary School
- St Hugh's RC Primary School
- St John's RC Primary School
- St Margaret's Anfield CE Primary School
- St Mary's CE Primary School
- St Matthew's RC Primary School
- St Michael-in-the-Hamlet Community Primary School
- St Michael's RC Primary School
- St Nicholas RC Academy
- St Oswald's RC Primary School
- St Paschal Baylon's RC Primary School
- St Patrick's RC Primary School
- St Paul's and St Timothy's RC Infant School
- St Paul's RC Junior School
- St Sebastian's RC Primary School and Nursery
- St Silas CE Primary School
- St Teresa of Lisieux RC Primary School
- St Vincent de Paul RC Primary School
- Smithdown Primary School
- Springwood Heath Primary School
- Stockton Wood Community Primary School
- Sudley Primary School
- The Trinity RC Academy
- Wavertree CE School
- Wellesbourne Community Primary School
- Whitefield Primary School
- Windsor Community Primary School
- Woolton Primary School

=== Secondary schools ===
- The Academy of St Francis of Assisi
- The Academy of St Nicholas
- Alsop High School
- Archbishop Beck Catholic College
- Archbishop Blanch School
- Bellerive FCJ Catholic College
- The Belvedere Academy
- Broughton Hall High School
- Calderstones School
- Cardinal Heenan Catholic High School
- Childwall Sports and Science Academy
- Dixons Broadgreen Academy
- Dixons Croxteth Academy
- Dixons Fazakerley Academy
- Gateacre School
- Holly Lodge Girls' College
- King David High School
- King's Leadership Academy Liverpool
- King's Leadership Academy Wavertree
- LIPA High School
- Liverpool Blue Coat School
- Liverpool College
- Liverpool Life Sciences UTC
- North Liverpool Academy
- Notre Dame Catholic College
- St Edward's College
- St Francis Xavier's College
- St Hilda's Church of England High School
- St John Bosco Arts College
- St Julie's Catholic High School
- St Margaret's Church of England Academy
- The Studio School Liverpool
- West Derby School

=== Special and alternative schools ===
- Abbots Lea School
- ASPIRE Centre, Kings Leadership Academy
- Bank View High School
- Childwall Abbey School
- Clifford Holroyde Specialist SEN College
- Ernest Cookson School
- Everton Free School
- Harmonize Academy AP Free School
- Hope School
- Millstead School
- New Heights High School
- Palmerston School
- Princes School
- Redbridge High School
- Sandfield Park School
- Woolton High School

=== Further education ===
- The City of Liverpool College
- Liverpool Business College

== Independent schools ==
=== Primary and preparatory schools ===
- The Belvedere Preparatory School
- Carleton House Preparatory School

=== Senior and all-through schools ===
- Auckland College
- Christian Fellowship School
- Nazene Danielle School of Performing Arts

=== Special and alternative schools ===
- Assess Education
- Birtenshaw School Merseyside
- Cavendish View School
- Employability Solutions Independent School
- Lakeside School
- Liverpool Progressive School
- The Connor Kirk Academy
- Progress Schools
- Prudentia Education
- Royal School for the Blind
- St Vincent's School
- SENDSCOPE

=== Further education ===
- Liverpool Theatre School
