= Sir Frank Whittle Studio School =

Location
- Bitteswell Road; Lutterworth, Leicestershire, LE17 4EW; England; 52.459354°N 1.206344°W

Information
- Type: Studio School
- Motto: Inspire the Mind, Create the Future
- Established: 2014
- Closed: 2019
- Trust: TLAT
- Department for Education URN: 141012 Tables
- Ofsted: Reports
- Gender: Mixed
- Age: 14 to 19
- Colours: Pink; Grey; Cyan; Blue
- Website: http://www.sirfrankwhittlestudioschool.com

The Sir Frank Whittle Studio School was a 14–19 Studio School, part of The Lutterworth Academies Trust. It was situated alongside Lutterworth College in the rural market town of Lutterworth, South Leicestershire.

The school specialised in engineering, business and sport. It also worked alongside employers to provide students with external experiential learning.

The school closed in July 2019 because of a failure to fill places. There are plans to use the school buildings for a new special school.

== Construction ==
Plans were submitted to Harborough District Council in February 2014, with the intention to begin construction to be ready for the September 2014 cohort.

The Kier Group were contracted for the project with a build programme beginning on 9 February 2015 and finishing with a final handover on 27 November 2015. Due to delays with planning permission, the build didn't start until 27 March 2015.

The first intake of students were admitted in September 2014 and as a result of the building not being completed, a temporary building was erected on the Lutterworth College site to accommodate the students until construction on the school was complete.

Construction was completed and the building in use from December 2015.

== Academic performance ==
The school received its first full set of results in August 2016. The school's results placed Sir Frank Whittle Studio School as one of the highest performing secondary school in Leicestershire, ranking 6th out of all schools reporting results. The Progress 8 score of +0.15 is significantly above national average.

As of 2019, the school's most recent inspection result was from 2017 and was Good.

In 2018 the school was listed as underperforming.
