= Liverpool Academy =

Liverpool Academy may refer to:

- Liverpool Academy of Arts
- North Liverpool Academy
- Liverpool F.C. Reserves and Academy
- O_{2} Academy Liverpool
- The Academy, Kirkby, Liverpool FC Training facility
