= Lutterworth Town Hall =

Municipal building in Lutterworth, Leicestershire, England

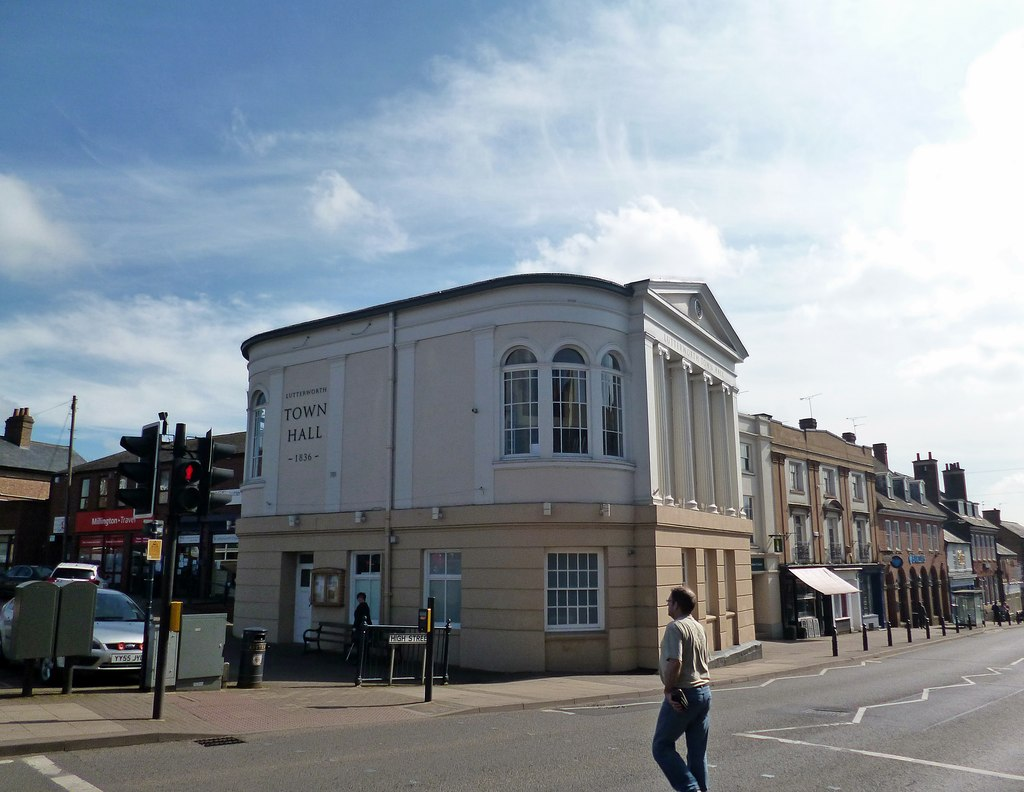
- Lutterworth Town Hall

- Shown in Leicestershire
- 52.4552°N 1.1998°W
- Location: High Street, Lutterworth

History
- Built: 1836

Site notes
- Architect: Joseph Hansom
- Architectural style: Neoclassical style

Listed Building – Grade II
- Official name: Town Hall
- Designated: 11 January 1955
- Reference no.: 1211129

Lutterworth Town Hall is a municipal building in the High Street in Lutterworth, Leicestershire, England. The structure, which operates as a community events venue, is a Grade II listed building.

== History ==
In the 1830s the town masters of Lutterworth decided to commission a building for civic events: it was agreed that the cost of construction would be financed by the Lutterworth Town Estate, an entity established for the benefit of local residents. The site they chose on the east side of the High Street was owned by Basil Feilding, 7th Earl of Denbigh who agreed to sell the land.

The new building was designed by Joseph Hansom in the neoclassical style, built in stone with a stucco finish at a cost of £1,600 and was completed in 1836. The design involved a symmetrical main frontage with three bays facing onto the High Street; the ground floor was rusticated and arcaded while the first floor featured a blind tetrastyle portico with Ionic order columns supporting an entablature, a frieze and a pediment with an oculus in the tympanum. The wings, which were curved, featured on the ground floor, a square sash window on the left and a recessed doorway on the right and, on the first floor, three round headed windows on each side. The architect had planned to erect a statue of the philosopher, John Wycliffe, who had served as rector of St Mary's Church, in the centre of the portico; however, this proposal was abandoned on the basis of its high cost. Internally, the principal rooms were the corn exchange and market hall on the ground floor together with an assembly hall, which featured a large chandelier with silver candle holders, on the first floor.

In 1890, the town hall was the venue for a meeting, chaired by Marston Buszard Q.C., at which it was overwhelmingly agreed to support proposals for the Manchester, Sheffield and Lincolnshire Railway, despite the route coming within 400 metres (1,300 ft) of the town centre. Following significant population growth, largely associated with the status of Lutterworth as a market town, the area became a rural district in 1894. The new council continued to use the town hall for civic events but based its council officers and their departments in council offices in Coventry Road. The building was also used as the local magistrates' court until 1906 when a dedicated courthouse was established in Gilmorton Road. At around the same time, the arcading on the ground floor of the town floor was infilled with sash windows and a new dance floor was laid in the assembly hall.

In 1984, ownership of the building was transferred to an entity known as the Lutterworth Town Hall Charity, which was managed by independent trustees with the objective of preserving and maintaining the building. The charity carried out a programme of refurbishment works, which included the installation of a lift, at a cost of £45,000 in the late 1980s. The building became an approved venue for weddings and civil partnership ceremonies in January 2012 and a further programme of refurbishment works, which included the upgrade of the lift and which was part funded by Tarmac, was completed in summer 2021.
