= Lutterworth College =

College in Lutterworth, Leicestershire, England

Location
- Bitteswell Road; Lutterworth, Leicestershire, LE17 4EW; England
- 52°27′37″N 1°12′32″W

Information
- Type: Academy
- Motto: Latin: Sapere Aude; Dare to be Wise
- Religious affiliation: Church of England
- Established: 1880
- Trust: The Lutterworth Academies Trust
- Department for Education URN: 138150 Tables
- Ofsted: Reports
- Headteacher: Dominic Lane
- Staff: 197
- Gender: Mixed
- Age: 11 to 18
- Enrolment: 1482
- Colours: Blue; Grey
- Website: http://www.lutterworthcollege.com

Lutterworth College is a 11–19 non-selective, inclusive, comprehensive, Church of England Secondary School and Sixth Form College with academy status.

Lutterworth College is in the rural market town of Lutterworth in the district of Harborough, South Leicestershire. The school is a Church of England Voluntary Controlled school.

There are approximately 1,600 pupils currently on roll, with around 400 of these being in post-16 education.

The last full Ofsted inspection was in November 2017 where the college was judged to be good in all aspects. In 2019 the school was inspected under the SIAMS framework and was judged good in all aspects.

== History ==
There has been a school in Lutterworth at least since 1613 though the first part of Lutterworth College, then named Lutterworth Grammar School was built in 1880 to provide a middle class boys school for approximately 50 boarders and day scholars. The school remained an all boys grammar until 1902 when the school began to admit female pupils.

The school has grown in size from 30 pupils in 1881 to over 2000 in 2010. In 2014 numbers began to fall alongside the college's main neighbouring feeder schools, Lutterworth High School, Brockington College and Thomas Estley Community College expanding their age ranges from 11–14 to 11–16, much like the rest of Leicestershire.

In 2006, it was agreed to change the school's name from Lutterworth Grammar School to Lutterworth College, to reflect the fact that the college "is not a selective institution, but rather an inclusive one". In September 2015 the college admitted its first cohort of Year 7 pupils.

In November 2017, OFSTED judged the school to be a Good school in all aspects.

== Notable former pupils ==
- Kid Acne, artist and musician
- John Ashton, musician
- Stephen Biesty, author
- Michael Casey, Professor of Music at Dartmouth College
- John Cooper, Olympian
- Nick Cook, cricketer
- Jonathan Emmett, author
- Jamie Green, racing driver
- Jonnie Irwin, television presenter
- Kristyna Myles, musician
- Anthony Thistlethwaite, musician
- Alex Thomas, musician
- Simon Yates, mountaineer
