= Tendring Enterprise Studio School =

Location
- Jaywick Lane; Clacton-on-Sea, Essex, CO16 8BE; England; 51.7924°N 1.1198°E

Information
- Type: Studio school
- Established: 2012
- Closed: August 2016
- Local authority: Essex County Council
- Trust: Academies Enterprise Trust
- Department for Education URN: 138255 Tables
- Principal: Ian Pearson
- Gender: Mixed
- Age range: 14–19
- Capacity: 300
- Website: www.tendringenterprisestudioschool.org

Tendring Enterprise Studio School was a 14–19 mixed, secondary studio school and sixth form in Clacton-on-Sea, Essex, England. It was established in 2012 and sponsored by the Academies Enterprise Trust.

The school closed in August 2016 following an announcement in June 2015. In a letter to parents, principal Ian Pearson said: “We now feel that the direction of the school has moved away from the original studio school concept and, consequently, the Department for Education has agreed to the request from our sponsor, the Academies Enterprise Trust, to close Tendring Enterprise Studio School in August 2016." Current Year Ten and Year Twelve pupils were able to finish their two-year courses at the school.

== See also ==
- List of schools in Essex
