= Michael Casey (academic) =

Computer scientist and professor of music

Michael A. Casey is a Professor of Computer Science and Music at Dartmouth College.

He was educated at Lutterworth College, the University of East Anglia where he received a BA in music, at Dartmouth College where he received an MA in music, and at the Massachusetts Institute of Technology where he completed his PhD in media arts and sciences in 1998. He was previously Professor of Computer Science at Goldsmiths, University of London, where he directed the Media Futures Laboratory. He has an h-index of 35 according to Google Scholar.
