= Kid Acne =

UK-based artist, illustrator and emcee

- Born: Ed Bradbury; 1978 (age 47–48); Lilongwe, Malawi
- Website: www.kidacne.com

Kid Acne (real name Ed Bradbury, born 1978) is a multidisciplinary artist and emcee. He was born in Lilongwe, Malawi.

He grew up in Lutterworth, Leicestershire, and moved to Sheffield, South Yorkshire, England to study fine art when he was 17. He spent his formative years painting graffiti, creating fanzines and making limited run records on his own Invisible Spies imprint. Since then he has released 7 studio albums as Kid Acne, most notably Hauntology Codes, produced by Spectacular Diagnostics and released on Lex Records in 2023.

== Discography ==
=== Albums ===
- Rap Traffic (LP) / Invisible Spies 2001
- Council Pop (LP) / Invisible Spies 2003
- Romance Ain't Dead (LP) / Lex Records 2007
- Have A Word (LP) / Lex Records 2019
- Null And Void (LP) / Lewis Recordings 2021
- Hauntology Codes (LP) / Lex Records 2023
- Totemic Template (Edna & Friends Vol. 1) / Invisible Spies 2024

=== Appears on ===
- MONGRELS – Slingshots (7") / C U Next Tuesday 1997
- Toah Dynamic – Hip-Hop Gymkhana (7") / C U Next Tuesday 1997
- Invisible Spies (CD, Comp) / C U Next Tuesday Records 1998
- Req – Car Paint Scheme (LP) / Style Mentorz / Skint Records 2000
- Toah Dynamic – Movement (LP) / Invisible Spies 2000
- Lexoleum Two (12", EP) Rap Dracula / Lex Records 2001
- Lexample (CD) Radio Music / Lex Records 2002
- MONGRELS – Fresh Arrangements (7") / Invisible Spies 2002
- Toah Dynamic – Harvest Festival (7") / Invisible Spies 2002
- Toah Dynamic – Son of a Copper (7") / Invisible Spies 2002
- Toah Dynamic – Cops Hate Our Love (LP) / Invisible Spies 2002
- Abstract Funk Theory (2xLP, Comp) Ghosts With Teeth / Obsessive 2003
- Suspect Files Vol 3 (CD, Comp) South Yorks / Suspect Packages 2004
- Lexample (CD, Promo, Smplr) Eddy Fresh / Lex Records 2007
- MONGRELS - Low Budget High Concept (10") / Invisible Spies 2015
- MONGRELS - You Dig Raps? (7") / Invisible Spies 2015
- Burgundy Blood Meets MONGRELS - (cassette EP) ...In The Pop Wilderness / Invisible Spies 2016
- MONGRELS - Attack The Monolith (LP) / Invisible Spies 2016
- MONGRELS - Attack The Megalith (EP) / Invisible Spies 2017
- MONGRELS - Over Eggin' It (7") / Invisible Spies 2018
- I Monster - The Living Dead / The Living Dead

== Zebra Face ==
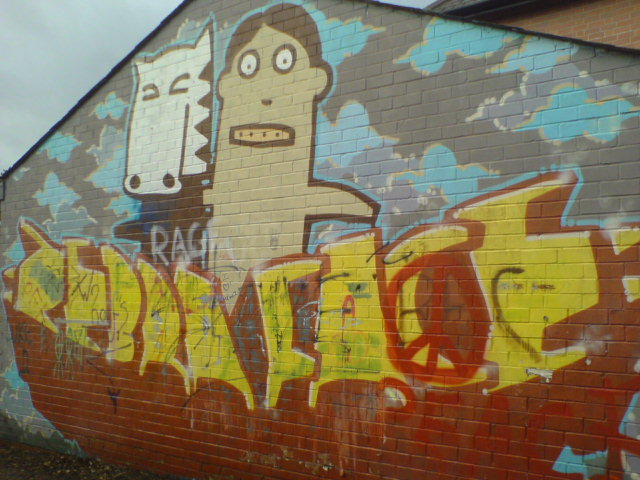
Graffiti of Zebra Face, painted by Acne in Lutterworth.

Zebra Face is a cartoon character created by Kid Acne and Supreme Vagabond Craftsman. He is a bombastic stripey horse with a hip-hop obsession and an insulin dependent sidekick. Zebra Face first appeared in a one-page comic strip in Kid Acne's 'Velcro Grass' fanzine in 1995. Generating mild interest amongst the UK fanzine scene at the time, Zebra Face then became a fanzine of his own before the duo began working on a book, which was self-published in 2001.

Zebra Face was made into a short animated series for Channel 4, broadcast in Autumn 2012.

== Selected solo exhibitions ==
- 2021: ALL THAT & A BAG OF CHIPS / Stella Dore Gallery, St Leanards (UK)
- 2019: HAVE A WORD / S1 Artspace, Sheffield (UK)
- 2017: MARK MY WORDS / C.A.V.E Gallery, Los Angeles (US)
- 2015: DESTINED FOR GREATNESS / C.A.V.E Gallery, Los Angeles (US)
- 2015: RUMBLE IN THE JUMBLE / B&B Gallery, Sheffield (UK)
- 2014: THE RETURN / Galo Art Gallery, Turin (IT)
- 2014: STANDARD PRACTICE / B&B Gallery, Sheffield (UK)
- 2014: ADAPTATIONS / Graffiti Life Gallery, London (UK)
- 2012: DAMN STRAIGHT/ Inoperable Gallery, Vienna (AT)
- 2012: STAND & DELIVER / C.A.V.E Gallery, Los Angeles (US)
- 2011: CLOAK & DAGGER / Other Gallery, Beijing (CN)
- 2011: KILL YOUR DARLINGS / Millennium Gallery, Sheffield (UK)
- 2011: RHYTHM IS A DANCER / Stolen Space, London (UK)
- 2010: WHEN THE SMOKE CLEARS / Concrete Hermit, London (UK)
- 2010: DUST IN THE GIANT’S EYE / Electrik Sheep Gallery, Newcastle (UK)
- 2010: OIS' EASY / Helmet Gallery, Munich (DE)
- 2009: SMOKE & MIRRORS / Stella Dore Gallery, London (UK)
