= St Margaret's Church of England Academy =

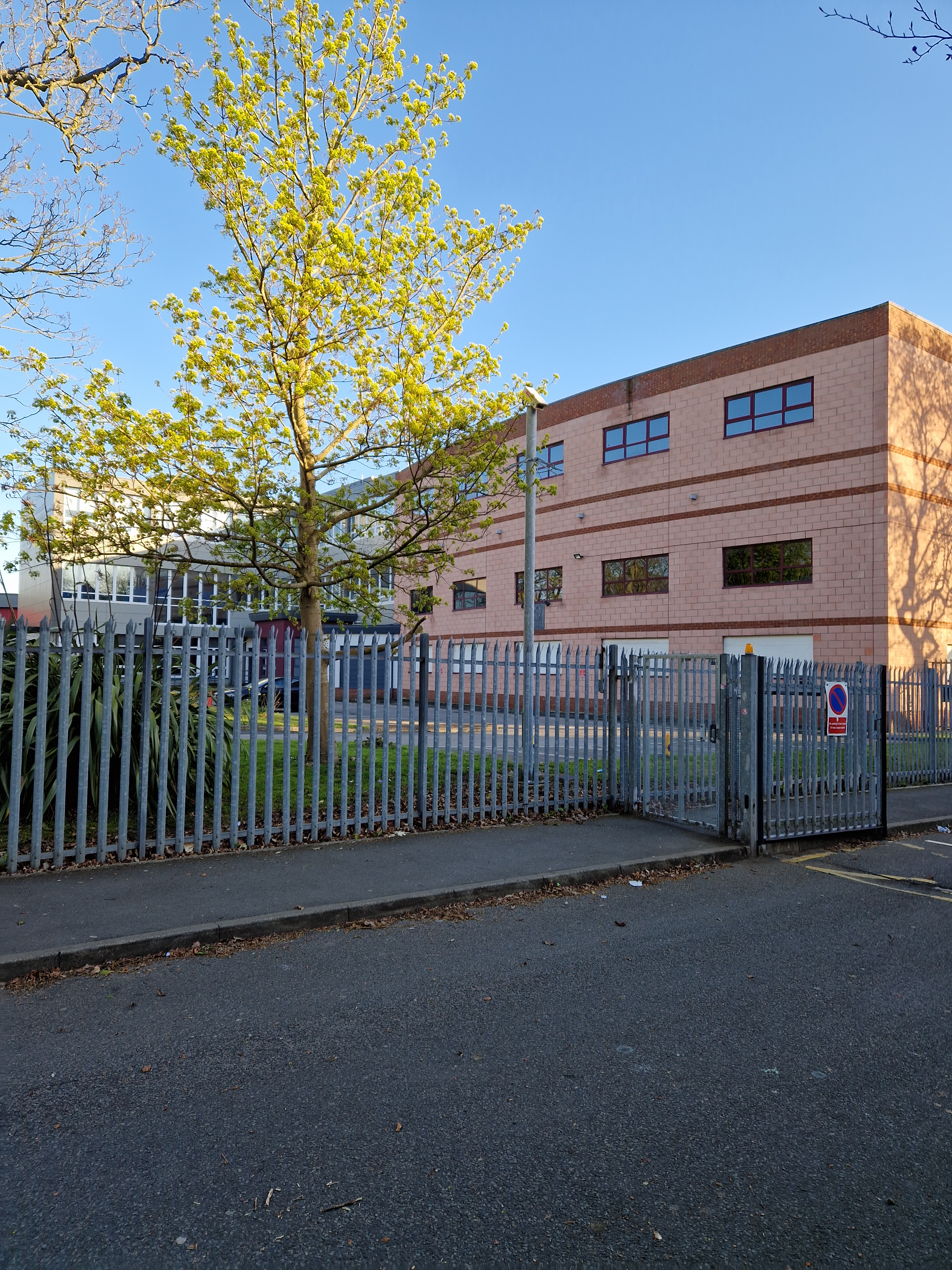
- School badge St Margaret's Church of England Academy building

Location
- Aigburth Road; Aigburth, Liverpool; L17 6AB; England; 53.3686°N 2.9301°W

Information
- School type: 11–18 boys Academy
- Motto: Fide et Labore (Latin: (by) Faith and Work)
- Religious affiliation: Christianity
- Denomination: Church of England
- Founded: 1879
- Local authority: Liverpool City Council
- Department for Education URN: 138850 Tables
- Ofsted: Reports
- Principal: Adam Robinson
- Gender: Boys
- Age range: 11–18
- Enrollment: 1,039 (2021)
- Website: www.stmargaretsacademy.com

St Margaret's Church of England Academy is an 11–18 boys secondary school in Aigburth, Liverpool, England.

Frequently shortened to SMA, as of November 2021, a total of 1,039 boys attended the school, 200 of which were in the co–educational Sixth Form provision.

== History ==
The original school in Anfield These drawings were the school Christmas card for the 1979 centenary

The school was founded by Alderman William Preston, one time Mayor of Liverpool, and the Vicar of St. Margaret's, Anfield, Reverend John Sheepshanks. The school opened in 1879 by the parish dignitary and MP for West Toxteth, Mr TB Royden. The school's first Headmaster was Mr E Crossley and an early teacher and benefactor was Mrs Gertrude Langton.

The school, as first moved to Aigburth

The school began as a Higher Grade School and after the 1918 Education Act, St Margaret's was recognised as a Central School with a selective intake based on a competitive examination. After the Education Act 1944, the school was restyled St. Margaret's Church of England School and during the 1950s courses leading to the GCE 'O' Level and 'A' Level examinations were established. In 1963 the school moved from Anfield to Aigburth. In the 1970s it had around 550 boys. In 1980 it was enlarged to a four-form entry school for students from 11 to 18 years of age. This was the year that the school had their first intake of girl students.

St Margaret's is a Church of England High School and was awarded Technology College status in 1997, and Specialist Language College status in 2008. The school increased its intake to five-form entry in September 1998. In September 2015 the school again increased its intake to six-form entry.

== Overview ==
=== Admissions ===
The school accepts 160 boys per year, and girls are accepted in years 12 and 13. St Margaret's Sixth Form is part of the Faiths Partnership with fellow member schools St Hilda's Church of England High School, Archbishop Blanch School and Bellerive FCJ Catholic College.

The school is on Aigburth Road (A561) just north of Aigburth railway station in Aigburth, just east of Otterspool. It is next to the Church of St Anne, Aigburth (C of E) which is the local parish covering the school.

=== Academic Attainment ===
In 2019, the school's Progress 8 measure for GCSE was average. Attainment 8 score was above average. The proportion of children achieving Maths and English GCSEs was considerably above average. The proportion of children entering the English Baccalaureate was considerably lower than average. The average A level grade was C+, in line with the England average, and the average A level points score was 32, below the England average of 24. Attainment 8 score was above average.

As of 2022, the school's most recent inspection judgement from Ofsted was that the school requires improvement. In 2020, the report from Ofsted was good and was confirmed by a short inspection in 2018.

=== School houses ===
The school organises boys into seven School Houses – Crossley, Royden, Langton, Sheepshanks, Preston, Walton, and Miller.

- – Crossley
- – Royden
- – Langton
- – Sheepshanks
- – Preston
- – Walton
- – Miller

== Notable former pupils ==
- Elliot Morley, Labour MP from 1997 to 2010 for Scunthorpe and from 1987 to 1997 for Glanford and Scunthorpe.
