= Archbishop Blanch School =

Location
- 80 Earle Road; Liverpool, Merseyside, L7 6HQ; England
- Coordinates: 53.4064°N 2.9600°W

Information
- Type: Voluntary aided school
- Motto: Ad Lucem Per Crucem (light through the cross)
- Religious affiliation: Church of England
- Local authority: Liverpool City Council
- Department for Education URN: 104705 Tables
- Ofsted: Reports
- Headteacher: Claire Madeloso
- Gender: Girls
- Age: 11 to 18
- Enrolment: 1,029 as of December 2022
- Website: http://www.abblanch.com/

Archbishop Blanch School is a Church of England secondary school for girls located in Liverpool, England. The school is named after Baron Stuart Blanch who was Bishop of Liverpool from 1966 to 1975, and Archbishop of York from 1975 to 1983.

It is a voluntary aided school administered by Liverpool City Council and the Anglican Diocese of Liverpool.

== History ==
=== Grammar schools ===
Archbishop Blanch School was formed in September 1981 from the amalgamation of two grammar schools, St Edmund's College (a direct grant grammar school) and Liverpool Girls' College.

=== Comprehensive ===
In 1993, the school moved from its original site at Sefton Park Road, Toxteth (formerly Liverpool College and then Arundel College) to a site vacated by Paddington Comprehensive School at Mount Vernon, before moving to its current purpose-built site in September 2015. The school was awarded specialist Technology College status in 1995 and became a Training School in 2007.

== Curriculum ==
Archbishop Blanch School offers GCSEs and BTECs as programmes of study for pupils. The school sixth form is part of the Faiths Partnership with fellow member schools Bellerive FCJ Catholic College, St Hilda's Church of England High School and St Margaret's Church of England Academy. Together, the schools offer a range of A-levels and further BTECs.

Ofsted rates the school as 'Outstanding'.

== Notable former pupils ==
=== St Edmund's College ===
- Jean Alexander, actress who played Hilda Ogden on Coronation Street
- Kim Cattrall (briefly), actress
- Janice Long, former Radio 1 presenter from 1982 to 2006 and presented Top of the Pops (1966–73)
- Heidi Thomas, screenplay writer who writes the television period drama Call the Midwife; married to Stephen McGann
