= Anfield Community Comprehensive School =

Location
- Priory Road; Liverpool, Merseyside, L4 2SL; England; 53.4335°N 2.9554°W

Information
- Established: 1964
- Closed: 2006
- Local authority: Liverpool City Council
- Ofsted: Reports
- Gender: co-educational
- Age: 11 to 18
- Colour

Anfield Community Comprehensive School was a secondary school in the Anfield area of Liverpool, England. The school had over 1100 pupils. The Anfield code was "Committed to achievement in the community".

== History ==
=== Priory Community Comprehensive School ===
This former school was on Priory Road.

On Tuesday March 10 1987, 55-year-old deputy headmaster Christopher Francis Gitsham (1931-2019) was attacked in a corridor with an roofing hammer. He suffered head injuries and was rushed to Walton Centre, for a two-hour operation. He had a fractured skull and a brain haemorrhage. The teacher had been lured to the toilets.

A 14 and 15-year-old male appeared before magistrates on March 12 1987. The court case was in September 1987. The 14 year old had hit the teacher with the hammer. He later pleaded guilty to the assault, and received seven years. The 15 year old received five and a half years in October 1987.

In March 1988 Mr Gitsham, of Heswall, retired ten years early, for medical reasons. He died in December 2019.

=== Results ===
Located in the inner-city, the school struggled in academic performance indicators, but experienced a dramatic turn around in GCSE pass rates in the 1993 and 1994 results. A 1995 Times report profiling the "quiet revolution" cited a cleaner environment, uniforms, and a new code of conduct as causes for the change.

== Closure ==
Closure was planned in 2005 due to amalgamation with Breckfield Comprehensive School, some parents formed the Anfield Parents Action Group to organise opposition.

The school closed in 2006, and the merged school opened as the North Liverpool Academy. The North Liverpool Academy's first site was the Anfield building on Priory Road. The academy later moved to a new site near to Everton Park. Demolition of the school buildings commenced towards the end of 2010 and completed in early 2011.

== Notable former pupils ==
- Roy Boulter, drummer in the 1990s band The Farm
- The Christians (band)
- Neil Fitzmaurice, actor and comedian
- Lee Douglas, Anathema (band) singer
- Sonia Evans, 1990s singer.
