= St Mary's Church, Lutterworth =

Coordinates: 52°27′19″N 1°12′11″W

St Mary’s Church, Lutterworth
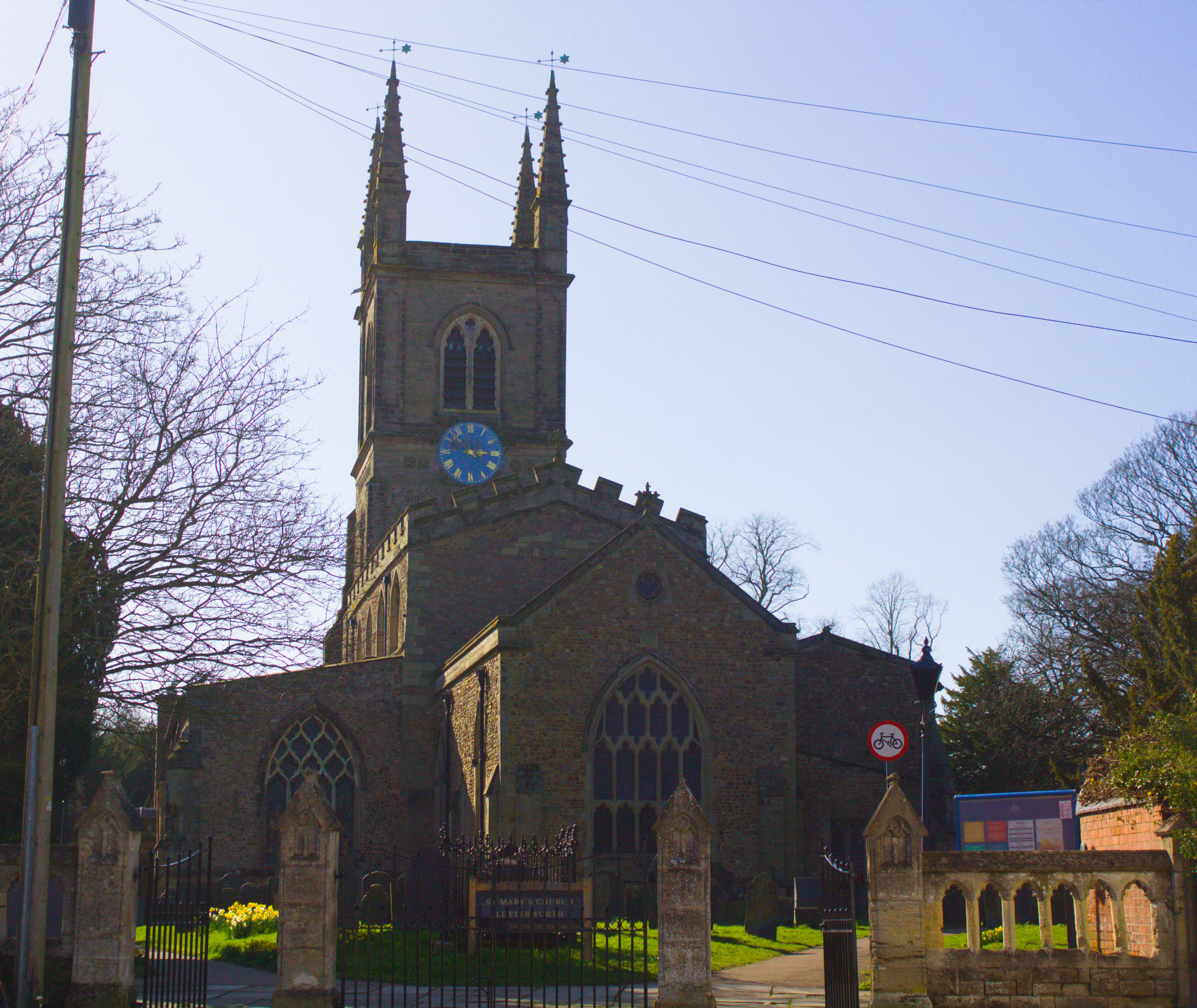
- View of the north end
- St Mary’s Church, Lutterworth
- OS grid reference: SP 54245 84453
- Location: Lutterworth, Leicestershire
- Country: England
- Denomination: Church of England
- Previous denomination: Catholic Church
- Website: https://www.lutterworthchurch.org/

History
- Status: Church of England parish church
- Dedication: Mary the Virgin
- Consecrated: 13th cent

Architecture
- Style: English Gothic

Administration
- Diocese: Diocese of Leicester
- Archdeaconry: Archdeaconry of Loughborough
- Deanery: Guthlaxton
- Parish: Lutterworth

St Mary's Church is the ancient parish church of the town of Lutterworth, Leicestershire. It is a Grade I listed building and is a member of the Major Churches Network

== History ==
The church building is 13th-century, with 14th- and 15th-century alterations. The church contains some surviving 15th-century wall paintings with the Lutterworth Doom appearing over the chancel arch and a depiction of the Three Living and the Three dead.

The spire on the church was blown down in 1703 and rebuilt in 1761. Sir George Gilbert Scott restored the building in 1866–1869.

The Irish statesman Robert le Poer was parish priest here c.1318.

=== Wycliffe ===
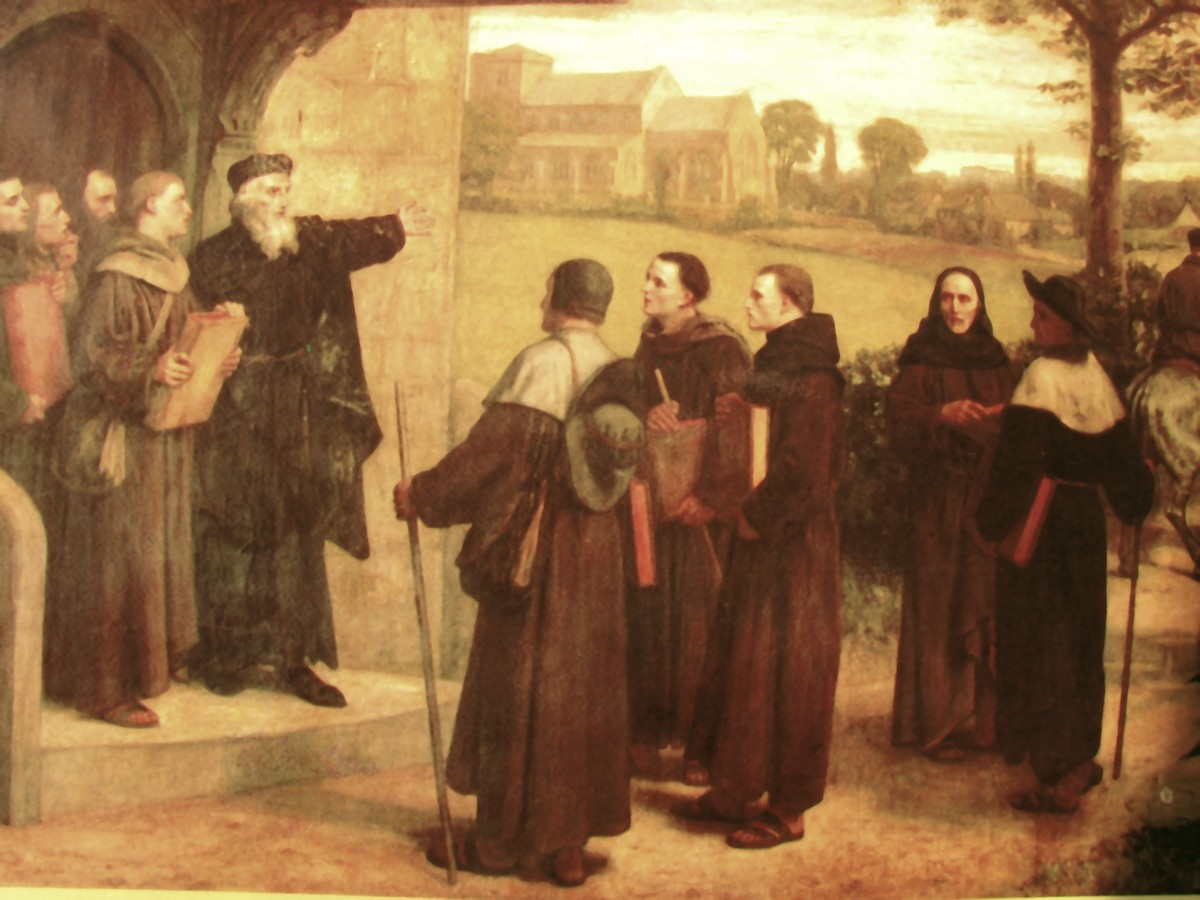
Wyclif Giving 'The Poor Priests' His Translation of the Bible by William Frederick Yeames, published before 1923.

The translator John Wycliffe was rector of the church between 1374 and 1384. It was in the Lutterworth rectory that he is traditionally believed to have produced the first translation of the Bible from Latin into English (see Wycliffe's Bible). His translation of the Bible into English started the Lollard movement.

== The Lutterworth Wall Paintings ==
In spite of the significance of the church for early English Protestantism the church is home to a remarkable set of surviving pre-reformation murals. Painted during the 15th century (1400s) they consist of a large Doom over the chancel arch, with figures rising out of tombs and large seated Christ in majesty surrounded by angels, and a remarkably fine example of the Three Living and the Three Dead around the north aisle door. The paintings were uncovered and restored by Eve Baker in the 1980s.

The Lutterworth Wall Paintings
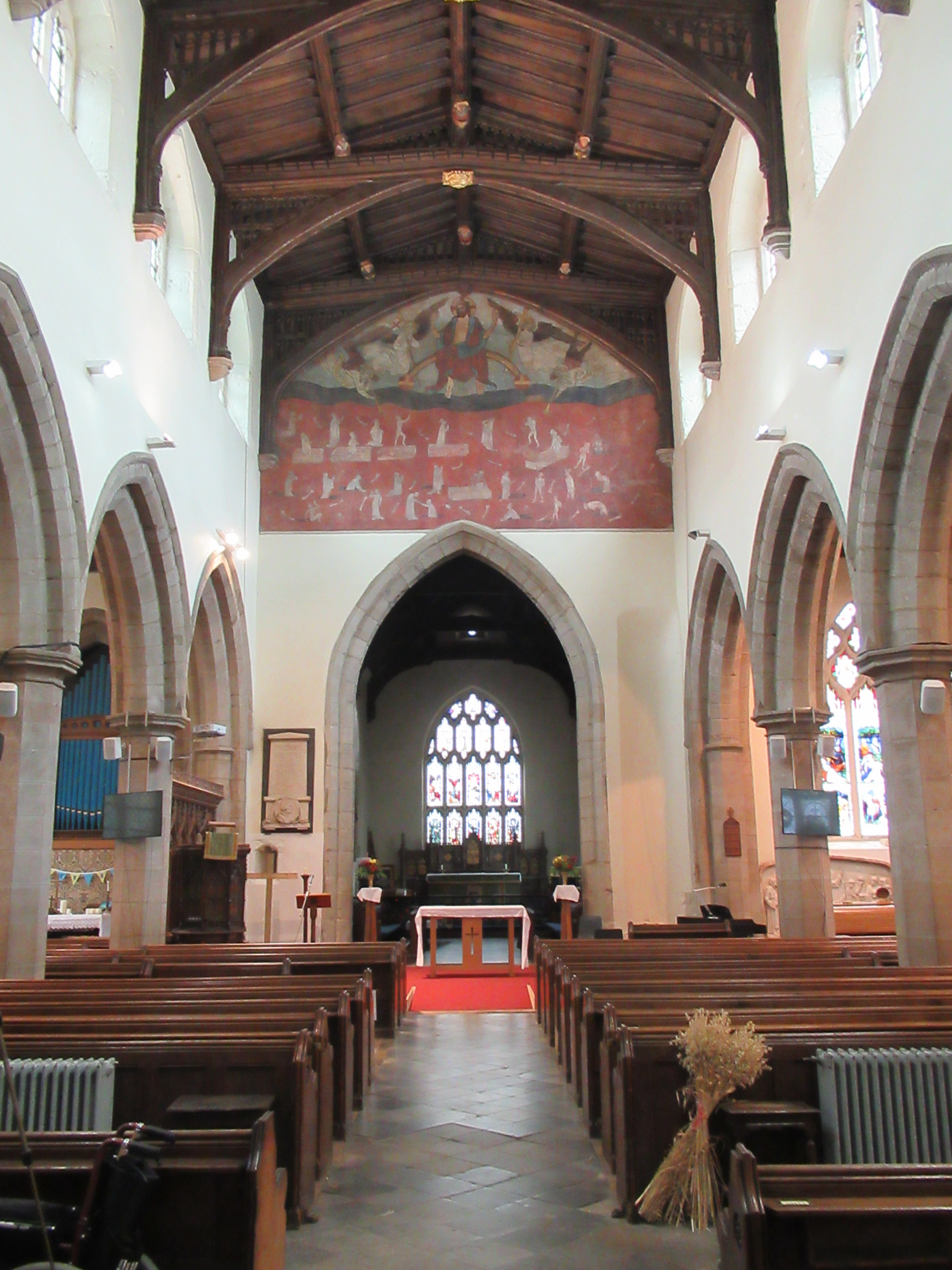
Interior of the nave, showing the Doom over the chancel arch

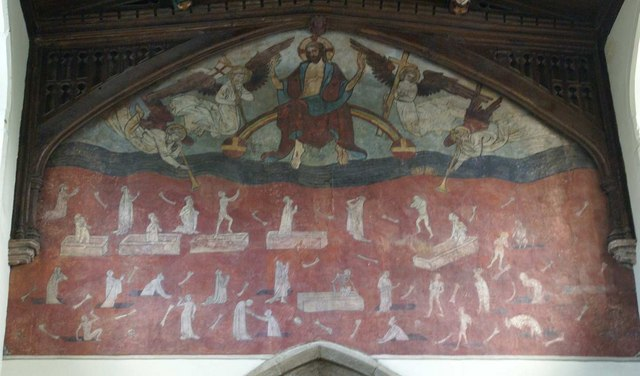
Close up of the Doom

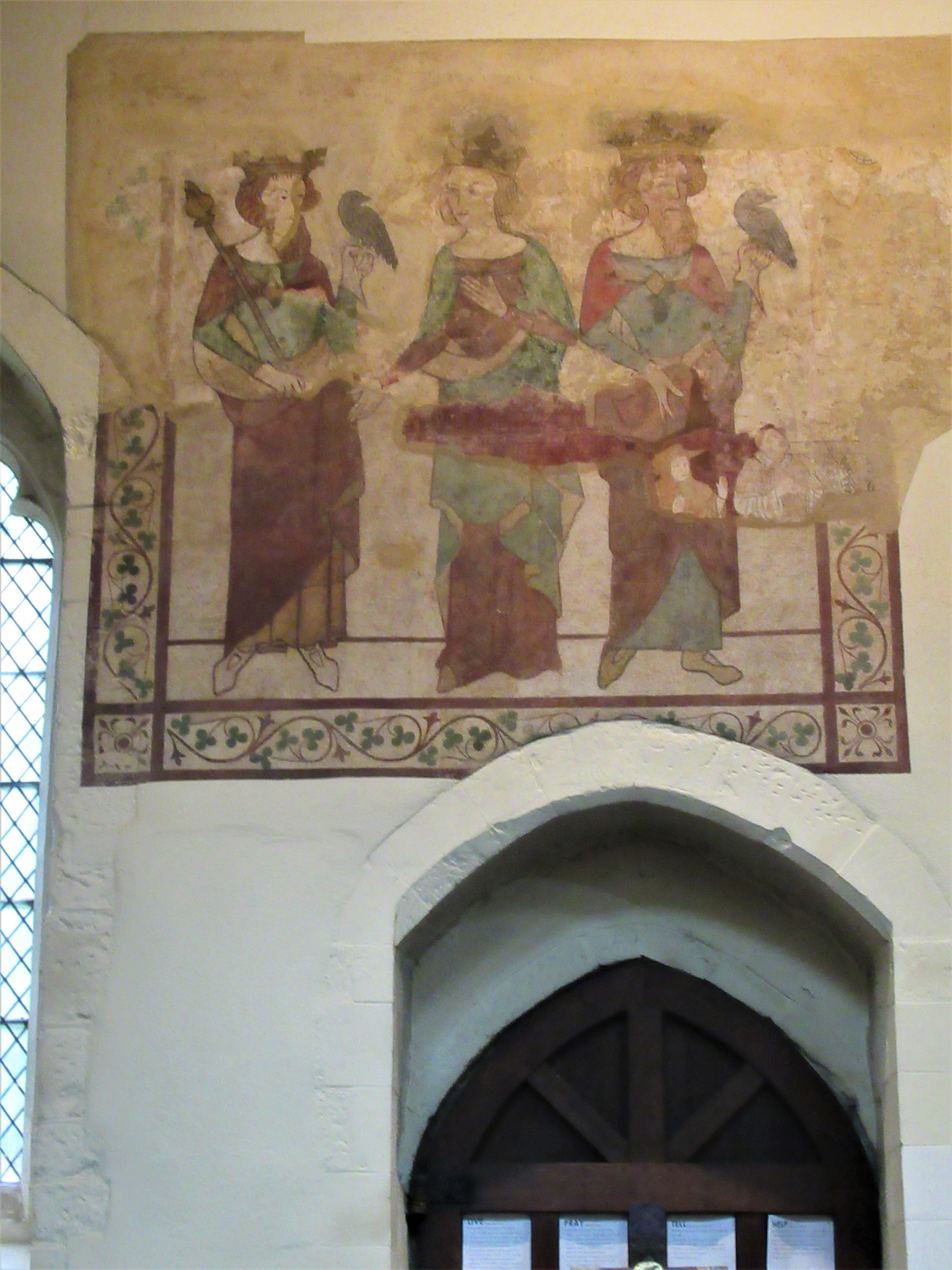
The Three Living

== See also ==
- Grade I listed buildings in Leicestershire
- The Coventry Doom Painting
- The Pickering Wall Paintings
- The Raunds Wall Paintings
- The Slapton Wall Paintings
