= The Studio School Liverpool =

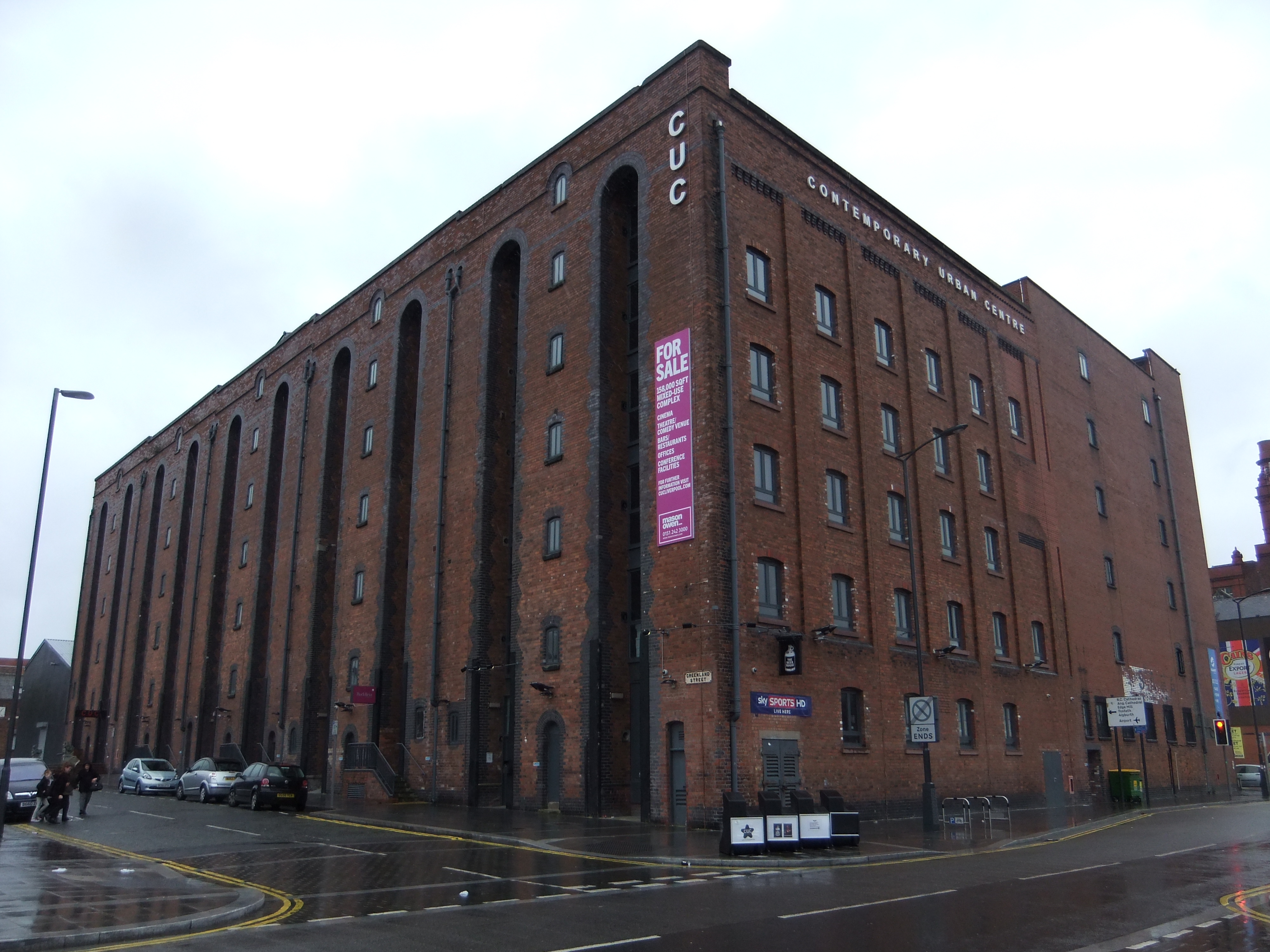
- Former Contemporary Urban Centre, now occupied by the school.

Location
- 41 Greenland Street; Liverpool, Merseyside, L1 0BS; England; 53°23′41″N 2°58′45″W

Information
- Other name: The Studio
- Type: Studio school
- Established: September 2013
- Local authority: Liverpool City Council
- Trust: Northern Schools Trust
- Department for Education URN: 139589 Tables
- Ofsted: Reports
- Principal: Ms Jill Davies
- Gender: Mixed
- Age range: 13–19
- Enrolment: 304 (2020)
- Capacity: 300
- Colour: Yellow/Black
- Website: www.thestudioliverpool.uk

The Studio School Liverpool (simply referred to as The Studio) is a 14–19 mixed, studio school and sixth form in Liverpool, Merseyside, England. It was established in September 2013 and is part of the Northern Schools Trust. It can be considered a sister school to Liverpool Life Sciences UTC which is run by the same trust and shares the same section of the former Contemporary Urban Centre, a restored Victorian-era warehouse in the Baltic Triangle.

== History ==
The former Contemporary Urban Centre, more commonly known as CUC, is a grade II-listed, Victorian era warehouse on Greenland Street in Liverpool. It was built in the late 19th century, possibly as early as 1854, and was as an oil warehouse from at least 1890. It became a grade II-listed building on 19 June 1985.

The building was renovated in 2008 and used as a charity-operated "cinema, theatre and auditorium, wedding venue and a restaurant and bar" but was forced to close due to loss of funding for the site in 2011. Once the site was shut down in 2012, it was bought by Northern Schools Trust and turned into The Studio School Liverpool and Liverpool Life Sciences UTC.

== Curriculum ==
The school specializes in technology and digital art, and has six sponsors that support its teaching. For its sixth form, pupils can choose their own courses or follow one of two recommended learning pathways that determine curriculum options. These pathways are:

- Creative – Three A Levels focusing on art and design, graphics and lens-based media
- Technologist – Extended diploma in games, animation and VFX, or AQA Diploma in Scripting and Programming, plus core or A-Level maths

The school also had an additional "Analyst" pathway which focused on more general subjects such as English/History/Film/Psychology/Computing/Maths, but has since removed.
