= Lutterworth =

Town in Leicestershire, England

Coordinates: 52.456°N 1.200°W

- Town and Civil Parish
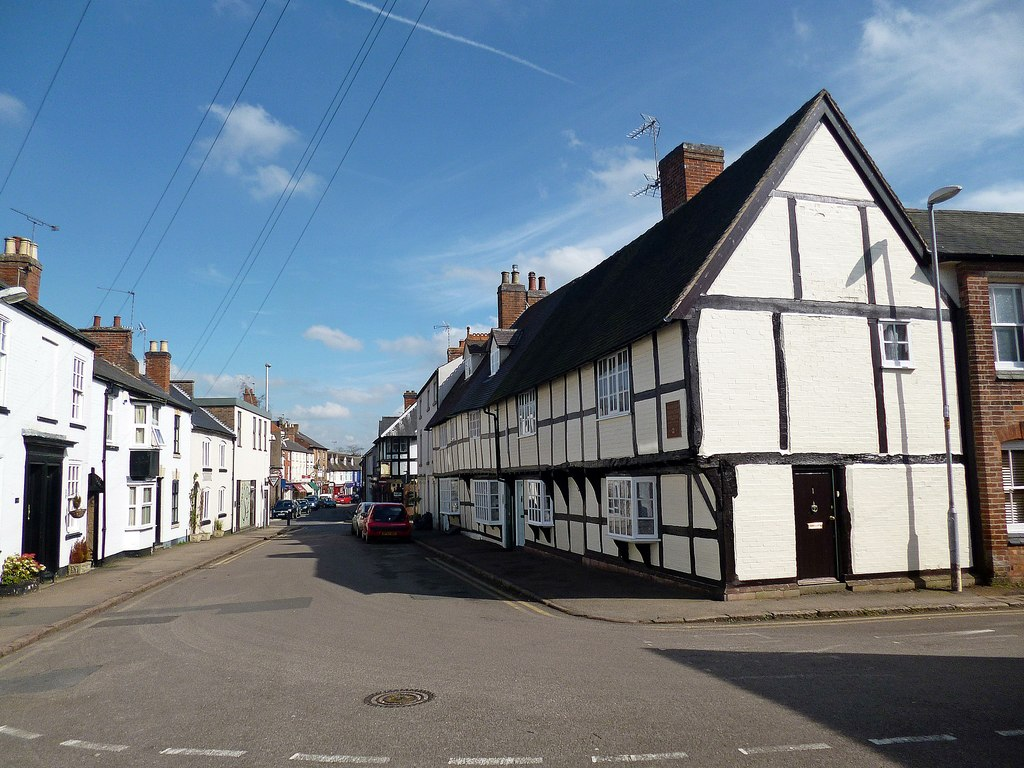
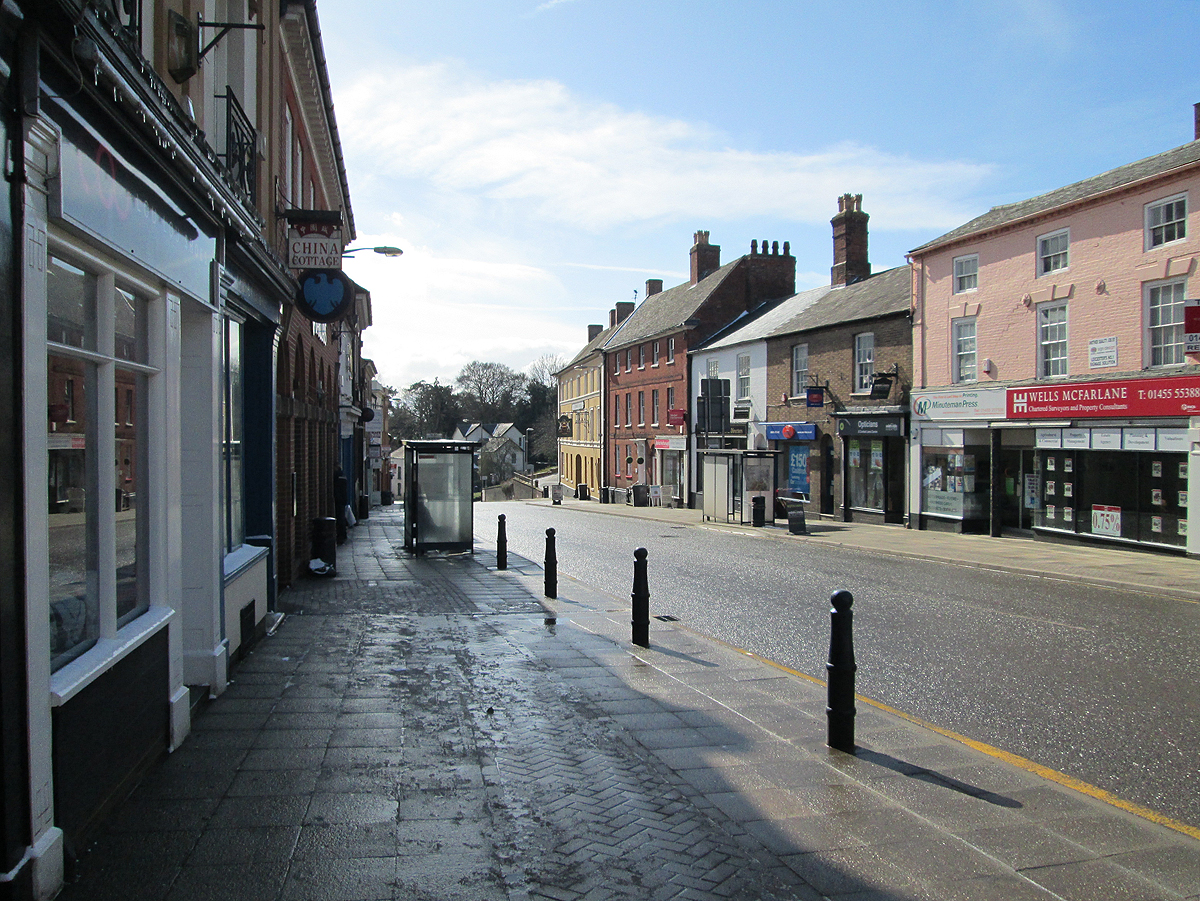
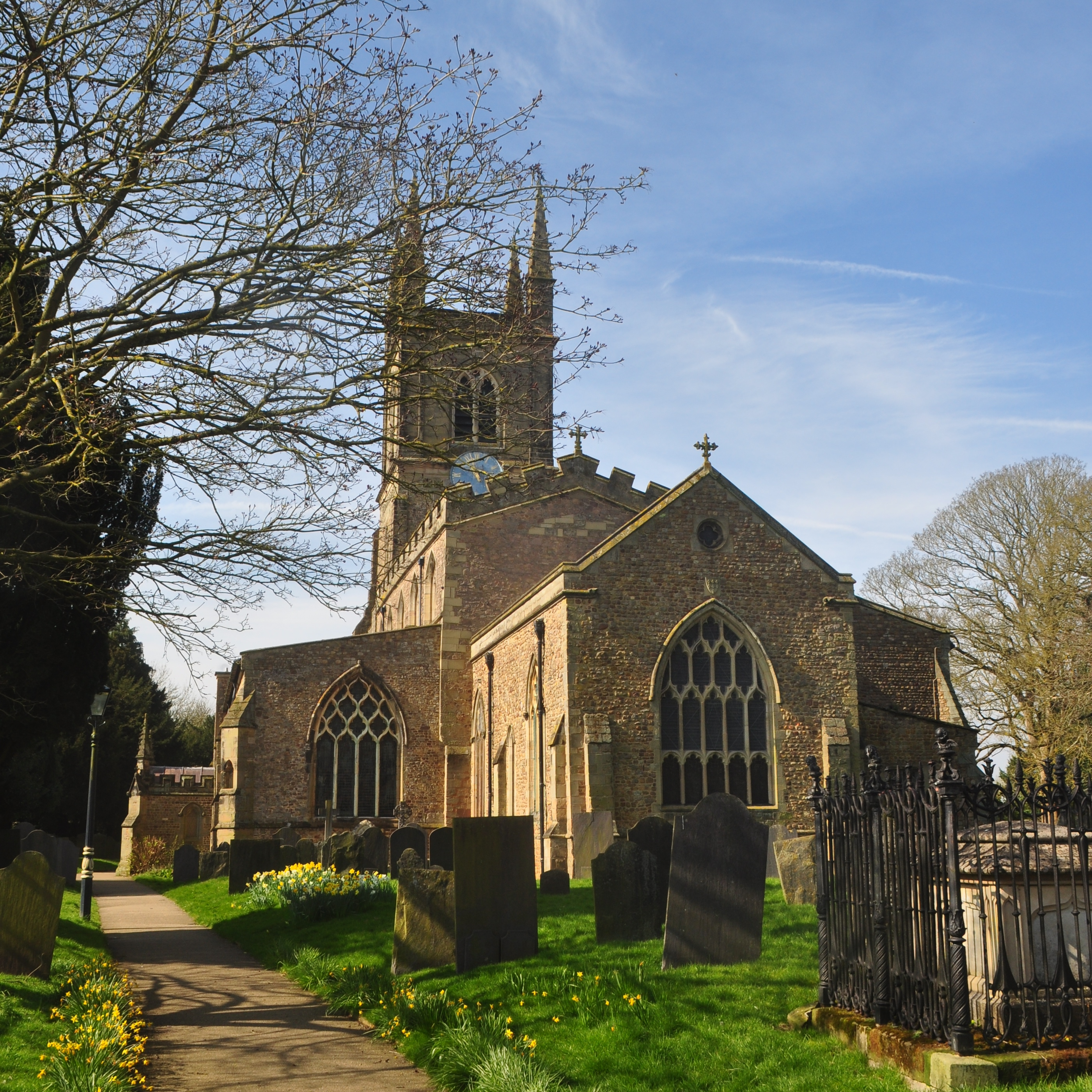
- Church Street High Street St Mary's Church

- Location within Leicestershire
- Population: 10,833 (2021)
- OS grid reference: SP541848
- Civil parish: Lutterworth
- District: Harborough
- Shire county: Leicestershire
- Region: East Midlands
- Country: England
- Sovereign state: United Kingdom
- Post town: LUTTERWORTH
- Postcode district: LE17
- Dialling code: 01455
- UK Parliament: South Leicestershire
- Website: Lutterworth Town Council

Lutterworth is a historic market town and civil parish in the Harborough district of Leicestershire, England. The town is located in southern Leicestershire, close to the borders with Warwickshire and Northamptonshire. It is located 6.5 miles (10.5 kilometres) north of Rugby and 12 miles (19 kilometres) south of Leicester. At the 2021 UK census, Lutterworth had a population of 10,833.

== History ==
Lutterworth was originally an Anglo-Saxon settlement; the name Lutterworth is possibly derived from the Old English hlūtreworð meaning 'enclosure on the River Hlūtre' (which is likely an old name of the River Swift). The name Hlūtre itself is probably derived from the Old English hlūttor meaning 'clear' or 'bright'. Lutterworth was mentioned in the Domesday Book of 1086.

Lutterworth was granted its market charter in 1214 by King John and became a small but busy market town.

In the 14th century, the religious reformer John Wycliffe was rector of Lutterworth between 1374 and 1384, and it was during his time here that he is traditionally believed to have produced the first translation of the Bible from Latin into English. The Irish statesman Robert le Poer was also parish priest here c. 1318.

Lutterworth Grammar School was founded in 1630; by 1676 the population of Lutterworth had reached 644.

In the days of the stagecoach, Lutterworth was an important stopping place on the road from Leicester to Oxford and London, and many former coaching inns remain in the town. The town also contains a number of well-preserved half-timbered buildings.

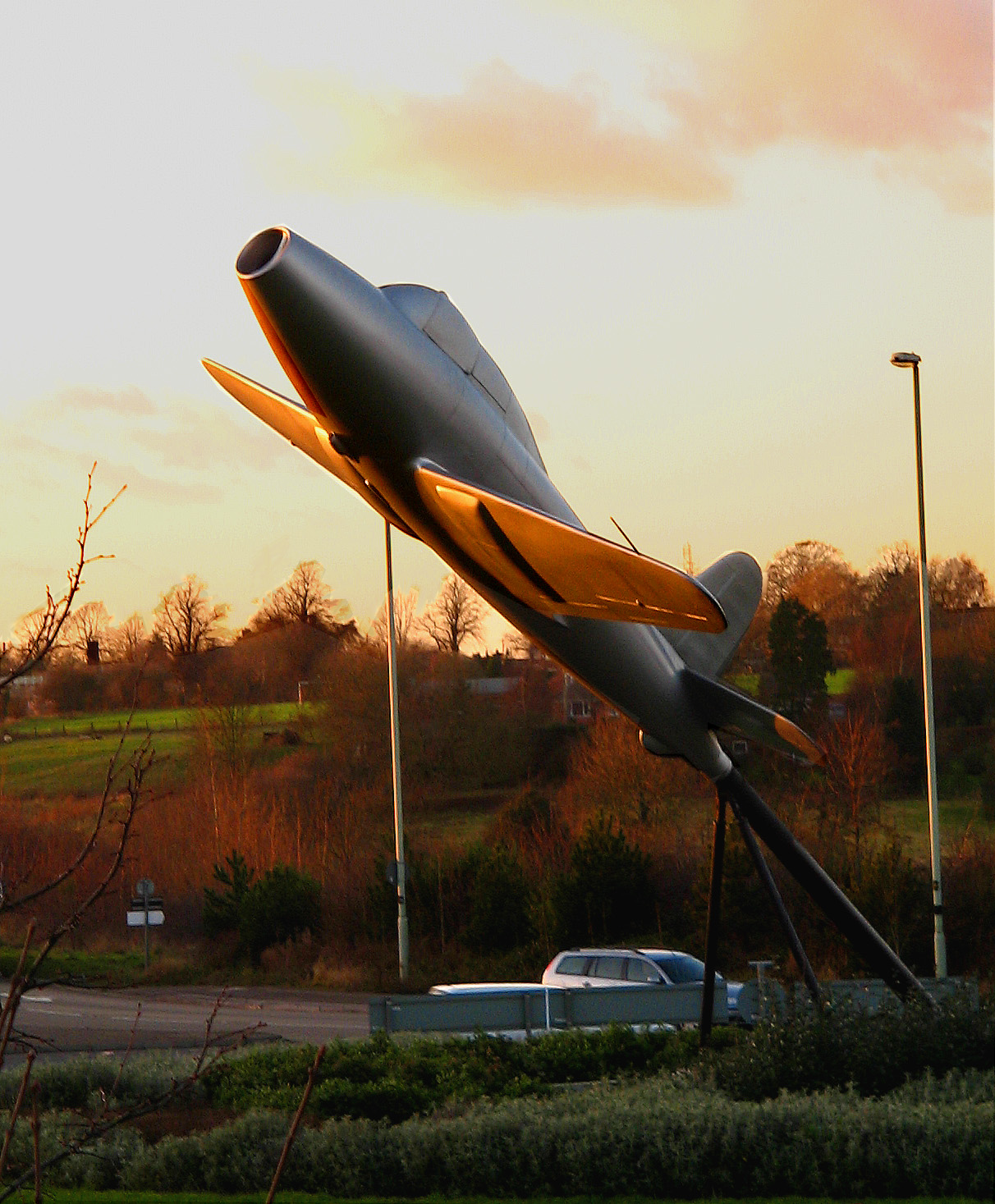
The Whittle Roundabout

Sir Frank Whittle, inventor of the jet engine, developed some of the world's first jet engines at the British Thomson-Houston works in Lutterworth, and in nearby Rugby, during the late 1930s and the 1940s, with his company Power Jets. A replica of his first jet aircraft, the Gloster E.28/39, stands in the middle of a roundabout just south of the town as a memorial and a number of papers and documents relating to Whittle's development of the jet engine are displayed at the town's museum.

The M1 motorway was built just to the east of Lutterworth in 1964, and the M6 motorway was built a few miles to the south in 1971.

At the time of the first national census in 1801, Lutterworth had a population of 1,652; this had nearly doubled to 3,197 by 1901. By 2001 it had reached 8,294. Further population growth in the 21st century brought the population up to nearly 10,000 by 2017.

== Notable buildings ==
=== St Mary’s Church ===
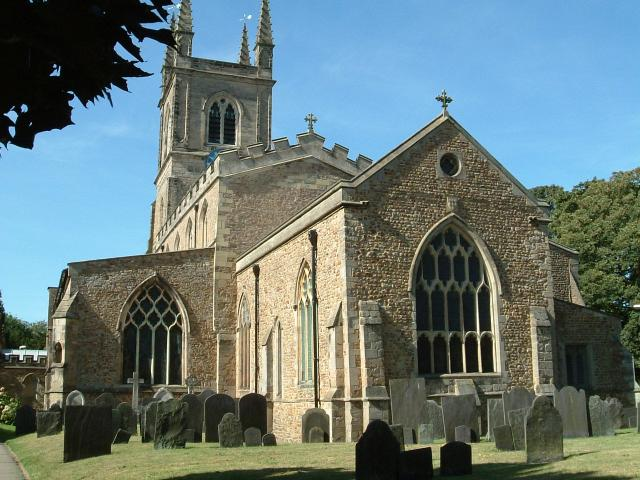
St Mary's Church, Lutterworth

The parish church of St Mary was originally constructed in the 13th century and underwent major restorations in the 19th when a large tower replaced the original spire. The church contains some notable 15th century wall paintings which have been uncovered and restored.

=== Cavalier Inn ===
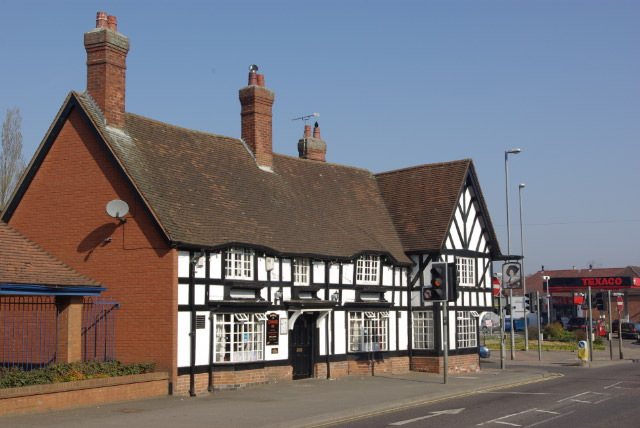
The Cavalier Inn

A notable landmark in the town is the 17th-century building located at the corner of George Street and Leicester Road on the northern edge of the town centre. It was once a tavern known as the Cavalier Inn. Originally named the "Ram Inn"—a name reflected in the nearby area called Ram Lane, it was renamed in the early 1970s following a brewery's rebranding efforts. Legend has it that the brewery disliked the original name and changed it to "the Cavalier," supposedly in reference to wounded royalist soldiers who sought refuge in Lutterworth after the Battle of Naseby in 1645. Over the years, the building has undergone modifications but still retains its rustic charm with stone walls, low ceilings, and exposed beams. In October 2010, the Cavalier Inn closed and was converted into a log-burning store. It currently operates as a café and vitamin shop.

=== Lutterworth Town Hall ===
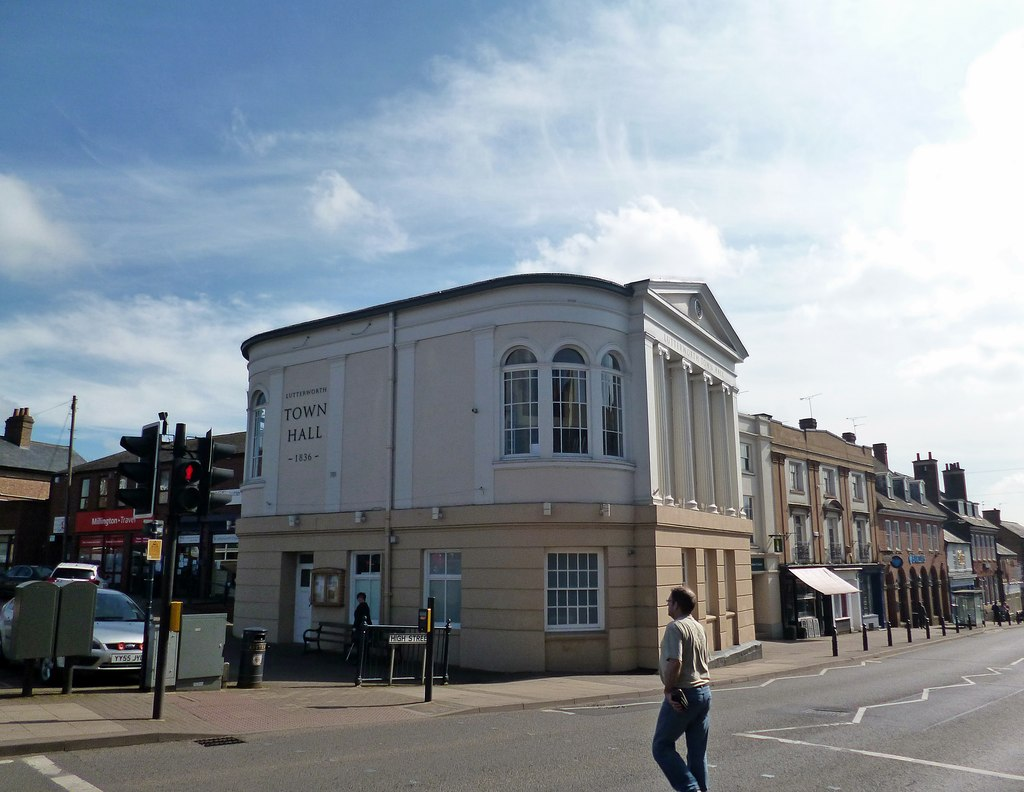
Lutterworth Town Hall

The architect of Lutterworth Town Hall was Joseph Hansom, who also designed Birmingham Town Hall and took out the first patent of the horse-drawn hansom cab.

=== Shambles Inn ===
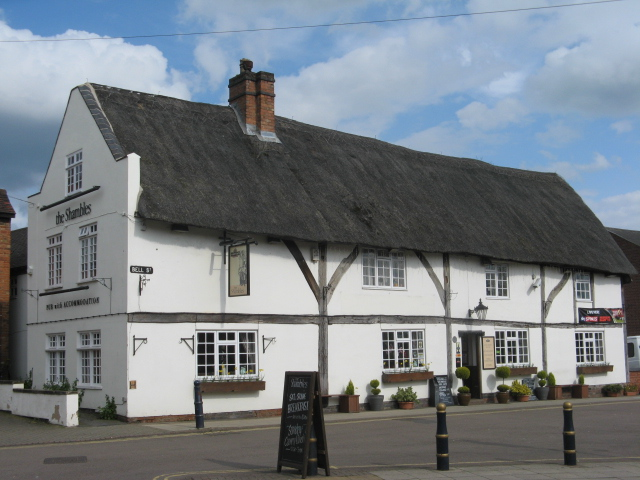
The Shambles Inn

Another of the landmarks of the town centre is the thatched roof and timber-framed building now known as the "Shambles Inn". This former abattoir and butcher's is the oldest timber-framed building in Lutterworth, dating back to the 16th century. It was first used as a public house from 1791 until 1840, when it was converted back to a home and butcher's shop. In 1982 it was converted back into a public house and named the Shambles.

In February 2023, the Shambles caught fire, causing damage to the upstairs, the B&B and the house. The Inn has since been rethatched and reopened.

== Local economy ==
To the west of the town [2.5 mi (4.0 km)] is a large logistics and distribution centre called Magna Park, which is the main source of employment in the Lutterworth area. Magna Park is built upon the site of the old Bitteswell aerodrome. Also near Lutterworth is Stanford Hall.

A controversial issue in the town is how to manage the traffic flows emanating from Magna Park and the nearby M1 and A5 trunk roads. Approximately 3,000 heavy goods vehicles pass through the town every day and pollution levels are reported as being high.

The Census 2011 summary also indicates an overall growth in residents' vehicles, which is likely to add to traffic and pollution concerns according to the Census summary.

On the Greenacres housing estate in the town there was an estate public house, recently called "The Sir Frank Whittle" and previously called "The Balloon". This building was sold by the brewery to the Co-op who changed the use and structure of the premises to be the new Co-op store in the town. The Co-op food store previously located on George Street closed, being replaced by a branch of the original factory shop, in June 2014 coinciding with the opening of the new store.

== Transport ==
Lutterworth lies on the A426 Leicester–Rugby road, adjacent to the M1 motorway at junction 20. It is also located within a few miles of the M6 motorway and A5 trunk road. A southern bypass, the A4303, was opened in 1999, providing a route for traffic from the M1 to the A5 to avoid Lutterworth town centre.

The nearest railway station to Lutterworth is Rugby, about six miles to the south. The town formerly had its own railway station on the former Great Central Main Line, which opened in 1899 and closed in 1969.

Historically there were another two railway stations close to Lutterworth: The first was Ullesthorpe & Lutterworth, about 3 mi (4.8 km) to the north west, on the former Midland Railway (later part of the LMS) line from Rugby to Leicester, closed on 1 January 1962. The second was Welford & Kilworth, at one time known as Welford & Lutterworth, some 5 mi (8.0 km) east on the London & North Western Railway (also later LMS) line from Rugby to Market Harborough and Peterborough, closed on 6 June 1966.

Arriva Midlands, Centrebus (North) are the operators of bus services around Lutterworth with services into Leicester, Market Harborough, Rugby, and Hinckley.

== Sport ==
The town supports two individual local football teams: Lutterworth Athletic, who play at Hall Lane, and Lutterworth Town, who play at Dunley Way, play in the Midland League Division One and the United Counties League Premier South respectively. Lutterworth Tennis Club is located just outside Lutterworth on Hall Lane. Banger Racing was staged on farmland adjacent to the Coventry Road (the A4303) until the late 1990s.

== Education ==
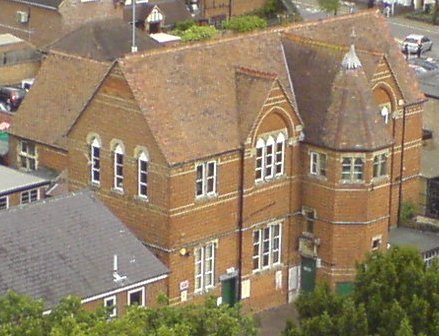
The Victorian building that housed Sherrier Primary School until 1983.

=== Primary schools ===
There are two primary schools in Lutterworth: John Wycliffe Primary School and Sherrier Primary School. Sherrier was originally housed in a Victorian building on Churchgate before moving to a new location on Bitteswell Road in 1983. Sherrier featured on the BBC TV children's TV programme Blue Peter on 5 February 2008.

=== Secondary schools ===
The local secondary schools are Lutterworth High School (for ages 11–16) on Woodway Road and Lutterworth College (for ages 11–18) on Bitteswell Road, both of which achieve good results in applicable exams. A new Studio School called Sir Frank Whittle Studio School opened in 2015 (for ages 14–18) that offers purely vocational courses. In 2019 the Sir Frank Whittle Studio School closed due to a lack of students and minimal further interest, because of its proximity to Lutterworth college the building was incorporated into their site for the use of the sixth form.

== Health services ==
Feilding Palmer Hospital, run by Leicestershire Partnership NHS Trust is situated in the town. It has a ward which provides general rehabilitation and palliative and end of life care. Under the Leicester, Leicestershire and Rutland Sustainability and transformation plan it is proposed to close.

== Notable people ==
- Sir Frank Whittle (1907–1996), developed the first jet engine in Lutterworth.
- Anthony Thistlethwaite, folk rock musician.
- Lauren Henry, world champion rower and Olympic gold medallist.
- John Wycliffe, an English scholastic philosopher, Christian reformer, Catholic priest, and a theology professor.
- Jonnie Irwin, an English television presenter known for presenting A Place in the Sun.
- Derek Gardner, a formula one engineer.
- Louis Page (footballer, born 2008) A Footballer who currently plays as a midfielder for EFL League One club Leicester City F.C.

== In popular culture ==
The 1973 sitcom Me, Myself and Nigel Wright was set in an ostrich farm near the town.

== International relations ==
Lutterworth is twinned with:

- Chambourcy, France (1998)

== See also ==
- Bitteswell
- Magna Park
