= Lutterworth High School =

High School in Lutterworth, Leicestershire, England

Lutterworth High School (LHS)

Location
- Woodway Road; Lutterworth, Leicestershire, LE17 4QH; England; 52.45273°N 1.20946°W

Information
- Type: Academy
- Motto: Where learning comes first
- Established: 1927
- Trust: Lutterworth High School Trust
- Department for Education URN: 137115 Tables
- Ofsted: Reports
- Headteacher: Julian Kirby
- Gender: Mixed
- Age: 11 to 16
- Enrolment: 827
- Colours: Green; Black
- Website: Lutterworth High School

Lutterworth High School is a coeducational academy school in the market town of Lutterworth, Leicestershire. It has an age range of 11–16. The school achieved an Ofsted rating of "Outstanding" in 2012, and later achieved its current rating of "Good" in 2024.

== History ==
The school was built in 1927 as a school for 11–14 year olds from the local community. It was originally Lutterworth Central School. It later became Lutterworth Secondary Modern, then Lutterworth High School.
