= Liverpool Life Sciences UTC =

Location
- 41 Greenland Street; Liverpool, Merseyside, L1 0BS; England; 53°23′41″N 2°58′45″W

Information
- Type: University Technical College
- Established: 2013
- Founder: Phillip Lloyd
- Department for Education URN: 139588 Tables
- Ofsted: Reports
- Principal: Ms Jill Davies
- Gender: Mixed
- Age: 13 to 19
- Parent: Northern Schools Trust
- Website: https://lifesciencesutc.co.uk/

Liverpool Life Sciences UTC, more commonly known as The UTC is a university technical college (UTC) which opened in September 2013 in Liverpool, England. The UTC is located in the Baltic Triangle, in the former Contemporary Urban Centre (CUC), a restored Victorian-era warehouse, which it shares with The Studio School Liverpool.

== Sponsors and partners ==
The University of Liverpool is the university sponsor of Liverpool Life Sciences UTC. The other sponsors of the UTC are Merseybio, North Liverpool Academy, the Royal Liverpool and Broadgreen University Hospitals NHS Trust.

Business partners of the UTC include Novartis, Thermo Fisher Scientific and Unilever.

== Admissions ==
The school has an annual intake of students aged 13 and 19 (academic years 9-13). There is capacity for 200 students in each year group.

The main catchment area of the UTC is the Liverpool City Region, which includes the five metropolitan boroughs which make up Merseyside and the Borough of Halton in Cheshire. Where the number of applications for admission to the UTC is greater than the number of places, places are allocated randomly to pupils from all of the six boroughs in the catchment area.

== Curriculum ==
Liverpool Life Sciences UTC specialises in science, healthcare and engineering, with a particular focus on life sciences. Students follow one of four learning pathways that determine curriculum options. These pathways are the healthcare academic pathway, the healthcare vocational pathway, the leadership and management pathway and the scientific enquiry pathway. For pupils aged 13 to 16 the pathways lead to different combinations of qualifications which include GCSEs, BTECs and NVQs. For sixth form students the pathways lead to different combinations of A Levels, BTECs and NVQs.

== Baltic Research Institute ==
Liverpool Life Sciences UTC is the only school in the United Kingdom that has its own student-run Institute. It consists of eight departments: Communications, Education/ Outreach, Business, Sustainability/ Conservation, Microbiology, Model Organisms, Molecular Biology & Advanced Manufacturing. The BRI (Baltic Research Institute) was launched in 2018 within the school's Innovation Labs.
