= North Liverpool Academy =

Academy secondary school in Liverpool, Merseyside, England

Location
- 120 Heyworth Street; Liverpool, Merseyside, L5 0SQ; England; 53.423694°N 2.969756°W

Information
- Type: Academy
- Motto: "Enjoy and achieve"
- Established: September 2006
- Founder: Nigel Ward
- Local authority: Liverpool City Council
- Specialist: Business, ICT, Mathematics
- Department for Education URN: 131065 Tables
- Ofsted: Reports
- Chairman: Nigel Ward
- Principal: Paul Johnson
- Gender: co-educational
- Age: 11 to 18
- Enrolment: 1328
- Colour
- Website: https://www.northliverpoolacademy.co.uk/

North Liverpool Academy is an academy secondary school in Liverpool, Merseyside, England. It was the result of the merging of Anfield Community Comprehensive School and Breckfield Community Comprehensive School onto one campus in September 2006. The campus originally belonged to Breckfield community comprehensive school. The school specialises in business and enterprise as well as computing and mathematics. A new £40 million site was constructed on nearby Heyworth Street, which is now fully operational.

The sixth form received a grade 1 in its most recent Ofsted report. The sixth form is a collaborative department with Notre Dame Catholic College and Alsop High School. This means students have a wider range of courses to choose from. The sixth form offers a vast curriculum, ranging from vocational courses to A levels. The school is believed to be one of the most improved schools in the North-west of England. The school is ranked 25th in the whole of the UK.

North Liverpool Academy is a sponsor of Liverpool Life Sciences UTC, a university technical college (UTC) which opened in September 2013. The UTC specialises in life sciences and healthcare, and is also sponsored by the University of Liverpool. It also shares the same building as The Studio School, Liverpool which is owned by the same trust.
