= St Hilda's Church of England High School =

Secondary school in Liverpool, Merseyside, England

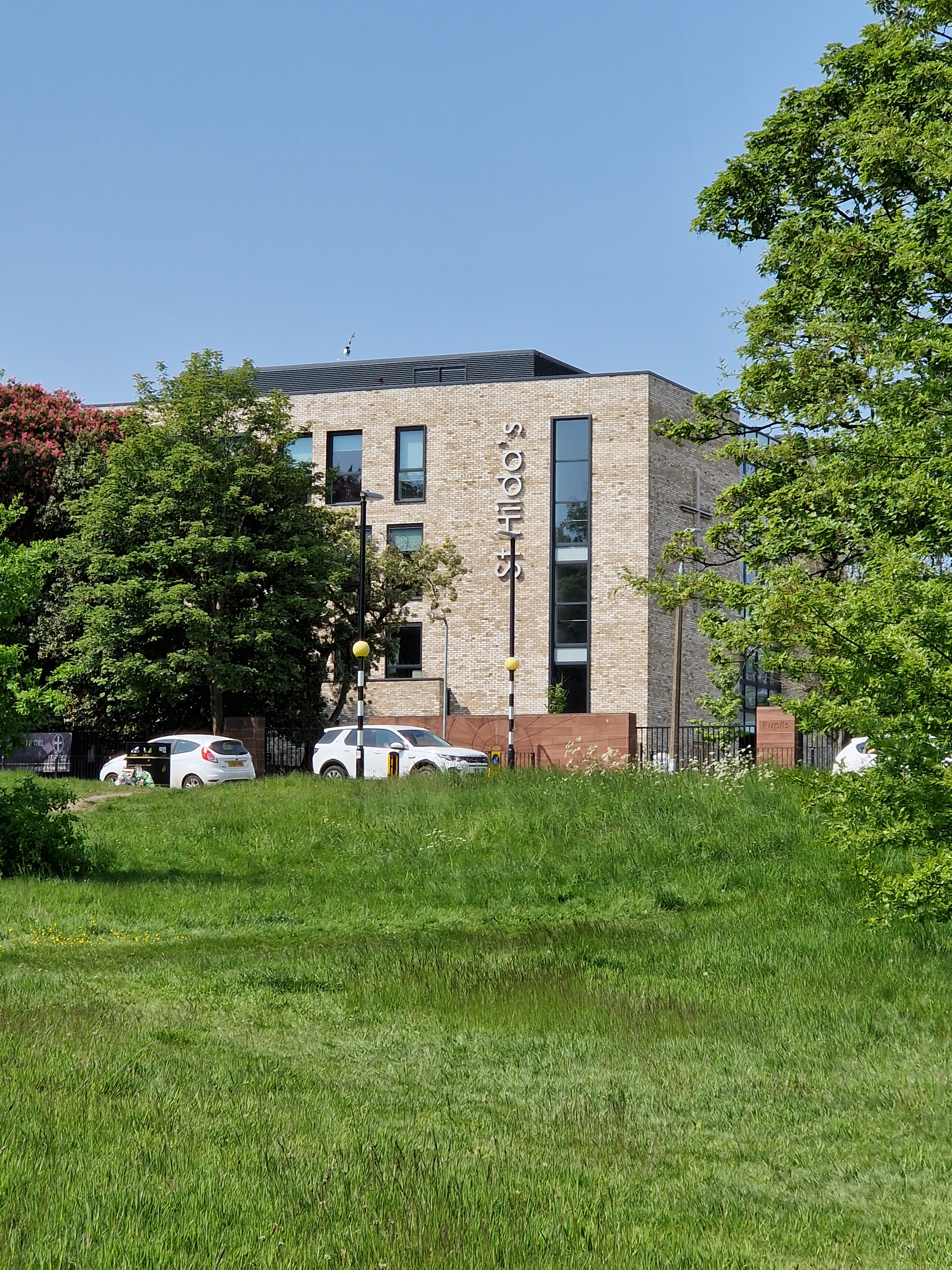

Location
- Croxteth Drive; Liverpool, Merseyside, L17 3AL; England; 53.388°N 2.939°W

Information
- Type: Voluntary aided school
- Motto: "Christ jesUS AS our cornerstONE
- Religious affiliation: Church of England
- Established: 1 May 1894
- Founder: Mother Emily Ayckbaum
- Local authority: Liverpool City Council
- Department for Education URN: 104721 Tables
- Ofsted: Reports
- Headteacher: Jo Code
- Gender: Co-educational
- Age: 11 to 18
- Enrolment: 1199
- Houses: Aspinall Tafari Roscoe Walker Wilkinson Brodie 🟦
- Colour: 🟦
- Website: http://www.st-hildas.co.uk/

St Hilda's Church of England High School is a secondary school with a sixth form, located in Croxteth Drive, Sefton Park, Liverpool, England. As of 2022-23, The school has been Co-educational since 2015. St Hilda’s spent many years as an all girls school, but in September 2015 the school began to enrol boys into the lower years after the completion of the new £15 million building. The sixth form has been coeducational for many years.

== History ==
St Hilda's was established as a girls' school in 1894 by Emily 'Mother Emily' Ayckbaum. Mother Emily's strong views on Christianity remain part of the school ethos. The Community of the Sisters of the Church opened "Sefton Park School" on 1 May 1894 with 17 pupils. By 1905, the roll had risen to 377, and the name changed to "Arundel Central School" in 1924. After the Education Act 1944, the name became "St Hilda's C of E Secondary Commercial Technical School", and, eventually, "St Hilda's C E High School" before its move to a new building in Croxteth Drive, Sefton Park, in 1967 when there were 361 pupils including 32 in the sixth form.

The Diocese persuaded St Hilda's to become comprehensive in 1980 with a four-form intake, and numbers have subsequently increased to 863 with a large sixth form. On becoming Grant Maintained in January 1995, the school began a building programme to improve its educational facilities, and this continued after returning to Voluntary Aided status with the addition of a Drama Studio and new library, officially opened on 15 April 2005.

For ninety years, St Hilda's only had women headteachers until 1980 when Mr Dawson arrived at the school, serving one of the longest periods. In 1997 he retired, leaving the school in the care of headteacher Christopher Yates. In 2009 Yates retired and Eleanor Benson, the former head of the sixth form, became acting headmistress. In 2016 Jo Code became headmistress.

In September 2015 the school became a coeducational school with 56 boys and 94 girls in that year's intake.
