= Harborough District Council elections =

Local government elections in Leicestershire, England

Harborough District Council elections are generally held every four years. Harborough District Council is the local authority for the non-metropolitan district of Harborough in Leicestershire, England. Since the last boundary changes in 2019, 34 councillors have been elected from 19 wards.

== Council elections ==
- 1973 Harborough District Council election
- 1976 Harborough District Council election
- 1979 Harborough District Council election
- 1983 Harborough District Council election (New ward boundaries)
- 1987 Harborough District Council election
- 1991 Harborough District Council election
- 1995 Harborough District Council election
- 1999 Harborough District Council election
- 2003 Harborough District Council election (New ward boundaries)
- 2007 Harborough District Council election
- 2011 Harborough District Council election
- 2015 Harborough District Council election
- 2019 Harborough District Council election (New ward boundaries)
- 2023 Harborough District Council election

== Election results ==
	Overall control	Conservative	Lib Dem	Labour	Green	Independent
2023	NOC	15	13	3	3	-
2019	Conservative	22	11	1	-	-
2015	Conservative	29	8	-	-	-

A dash indicates that the results for a particular election are not available, or that a party did not stand in an election.

== Results maps ==
2003 results map

2007 results map

2011 results map

2015 results map

2019 results map

2023 results map

== By-election results ==
=== 1995-1999 ===
Glen By-Election 19 June 1997
Party	Candidate	Votes	%	±%
Conservative		544	52.7	−4.4
Liberal Democrats		339	32.8	+32.8
Labour		149	14.4	−28.6
Majority		205	19.9	
Turnout		1,032	33.0	
Conservative hold		Swing		

Kibworth By-Election 16 April 1998
Party	Candidate	Votes	%	±%
Liberal Democrats		733	50.2	+43.9
Conservative		500	34.3	+11.7
Independent		119	8.2	−49.7
Independent		66	4.5	+4.5
Majority		233	15.9	
Turnout		1,418	34.7	
Liberal Democrats gain from Independent		Swing		

=== 1999-2003 ===
Market Harborough North By-Election 13 July 2000
Party	Candidate	Votes	%	±%
Liberal Democrats		690	55.1	−3.7
Conservative		562	44.9	+13.0
Majority		128	10.2	
Turnout		1,252	31.0	
Liberal Democrats hold		Swing		

Broughton By-Election 7 June 2001
Party	Candidate	Votes	%	±%
Conservative		2,255	61.3	+3.1
Labour		1,426	37.7	−3.1
Majority		829	23.6	
Turnout		3,681		
Conservative hold		Swing		

Glen By-Election 7 June 2001
Party	Candidate	Votes	%	±%
Conservative		549	48.3	−10.4
Liberal Democrats		367	32.3	+32.3
Labour		221	19.4	−21.9
Majority		182	16.0	
Turnout		1,137		
Conservative hold		Swing		

Gilmorton By-Election 2 May 2002
Party	Candidate	Votes	%	±%
Conservative		397	46.7	+4.5
Liberal Democrats		374	43.9	−3.2
Labour		80	9.4	−1.3
Majority		23	2.8	
Turnout		851	55.0	
Conservative gain from Liberal Democrats		Swing		

=== 2003-2007 ===
Market Harborough Logan By-Election 19 August 2004
Party	Candidate	Votes	%	±%
Liberal Democrats	Carol LoGalbo	615	51.9	−7.8
Conservative	Robert Brewer	570	48.1	+7.8
Majority		45	3.8	
Turnout		1,185	33.0	
Liberal Democrats hold		Swing		

Misterton By-Election 16 March 2006
Party	Candidate	Votes	%	±%
Conservative	John Everett	425	57.6	−16.9
Liberal Democrats	Stephen Walkley	266	36.0	+36.0
Labour	Elaine Carter	47	6.4	−19.1
Majority		159	21.6	
Turnout		738	37.9	
Conservative hold		Swing		

=== 2007-2011 ===
Broughton Astley - Broughton By-Election 4 September 2008
Party	Candidate	Votes	%	±%
Conservative	Chris Golden	unopposed		
Conservative hold		Swing		

Market Harborough Welland By-Election 10 September 2009
Party	Candidate	Votes	%	±%
Liberal Democrats	Colin Davies	600	54.8	+7.1
Conservative	Barry Champion	373	34.1	+5.3
BNP	Geoffrey Dickens	122	11.1	+11.1
Majority		227	20.7	
Turnout		1,095	22.8	
Liberal Democrats hold		Swing		

Great Bowden and Arden By-Election 28 January 2010
Party	Candidate	Votes	%	±%
Liberal Democrats	Phil Knowles	966	61.8	+12.1
Conservative	Barry Champion	598	38.2	−12.1
Majority		368	23.6	
Turnout		1,564	24.9	
Liberal Democrats gain from Conservative		Swing		

=== 2011-2015 ===
Thurnby and Houghton By-Election 2 May 2013
Party	Candidate	Votes	%	±%
Liberal Democrats	Peter Elliott	1,341	63.1	−2.1
Conservative	Simon Whelband	785	36.9	+2.1
Majority		556	26.2	
Turnout		2,126		
Liberal Democrats hold		Swing		

Bosworth By-Election 7 November 2013
Party	Candidate	Votes	%	±%
Conservative	Lesley Bowles	259	54.2	−21.2
Liberal Democrats	Annette Deacon	114	23.8	+23.8
UKIP	Bill Piper	105	22.0	+22.0
Majority		145	30.3	
Turnout		478		
Conservative hold		Swing		

=== 2015-2019 ===
Market Harborough—Logan By-Election 10 December 2015
Party	Candidate	Votes	%	±%
Liberal Democrats	Barbara Johnson	402	45.2	+9.0
Conservative	Paul Bremner	303	34.0	−1.4
Labour	Anne Pridmore	82	9.2	−5.9
Green	Darren Woodiwiss	56	6.3	−7.1
UKIP	Robert Davison	47	5.3	+5.3
Majority		99	11.1	
Turnout		890		
Liberal Democrats hold		Swing		

Misterton By-Election 17 November 2016
Party	Candidate	Votes	%	±%
Conservative	Jonathan Bateman	257	50.4	−24.7
Labour	Liz Marsh	119	23.3	−1.6
Liberal Democrats	Martin Sarfas	77	15.1	+15.1
UKIP	Bill Piper	57	11.2	+11.2
Majority		138	27.1	
Turnout		510		
Conservative hold		Swing		

=== 2019-2023 ===
Market Harborough - Little Bowden By-Election 6 May 2021
Party	Candidate	Votes	%	±%
Conservative	Peter Critchley	727	40.9	+4.5
Liberal Democrats	James Ward	507	28.5	−11.8
Labour	Maria Panter	213	12.0	−11.4
Women's Equality	Clare Bottle	149	8.4	+8.4
Green	Mary Morgan	122	6.9	+6.9
Independent	Robin Lambert	61	3.4	+3.4
Majority		220	12.4	
Turnout		1,779		
Conservative hold		Swing		

Market Harborough - Logan By-Election 29 September 2022
Party	Candidate	Votes	%	±%
Liberal Democrats	Geraldine Whitmore	582	45.7	+10.4
Conservative	Robin Cutsforth	382	30.0	+3.2
Labour	Maria Panter	250	19.6	+10.6
Independent	Robin Lambert	60	4.7	−6.4
Majority		200	15.7	
Turnout		1,274		
Liberal Democrats hold		Swing		

=== 2023-2027 ===
Glen By-Election 19 March 2025
Party	Candidate	Votes	%	±%
Conservative	Peter Scott	809	79.8	
Liberal Democrats	Christopher Graves	114	11.2	
Labour	Andy Thomas	77	7.6	
SDP	Robin Lambert	14	1.4	
Majority		695	68.5	
Turnout		1,014		
Conservative hold		Swing		

Market Harborough - Logan By-Election 17 July 2025
Party	Candidate	Votes	%	±%
Conservative	Paul Bremner	410	31.3	
Liberal Democrats	Roger Dunton	355	27.1	
Green	Jake Bolton	290	22.2	
Reform	Jonny Austin	190	14.5	
Labour	Bridget Fitzpatrick	44	3.4	
Independent	Robin Lambert	10	0.8	
Communist	Peter Whalen	9	0.7	
Majority		55	4.2	
Turnout		1,308		
Conservative gain from Liberal Democrats		Swing		

Fleckney By-Election 6 November 2025
Party	Candidate	Votes	%	±%
Reform	Jonny Austin	551	35.0	
Liberal Democrats	Stephen Walkley	453	28.7	
Conservative	Peter Critchley	416	26.4	
Green	Jessie Jenkins	102	6.5	
Labour	Helen Morrison	54	3.4	
Majority		98	6.2	
Turnout		1,576		
Reform gain from Conservative		Swing		

Market Harborough - Logan By-Election 18 December 2025
Party	Candidate	Votes	%	±%
Conservative	David Page	461	34.7	
Green	Jake Bolton	358	26.9	
Liberal Democrats	Marion Lewis	268	20.2	
Reform	Barry Walton	195	14.7	
Labour	Deborah Bennett	43	3.2	
SDP	Robin Lambert	4	0.3	
Majority		103	7.8	
Turnout		1,329		
Conservative gain from Liberal Democrats		Swing		

Lutterworth East By-Election 2 July 2026
Party	Candidate	Votes	%	±%
Reform	Bill Piper	403	28.2	
Conservative	Sarah Simms	386	27.0	
Labour	Martin Cullen	271	19.0	
Liberal Democrats	Stephen Walkley	270	18.9	
Green	Adam Holmes	97	6.8	
Majority		17	1.2	
Turnout		1,427		
Reform gain from Labour		Swing		
