= 2019 Harborough District Council election =

2019 UK local government election

← 2015	2 May 2019	2023 →

All 34 seats to Harborough District Council 18 seats needed for a majority

	First party	Second party	Third party
Party	Conservative	Liberal Democrats	Labour
Last election	29 seats, 46.0%	8 seats, 29.6%	0 seats, 11.6%
Seats won	22	11	1
Seat change	▼7	▲3	▲1
Popular vote	18,074	14,653	6,617
Percentage	41.8%	33.9%	15.3%
Swing	▼5.2%	▲4.3%	▲3.7%
- Results of the 2019 election
Council control before election
Conservative
Council control after election
Conservative

The 2019 Harborough District Council election took place on 2 May 2019 to elect members of the Harborough District Council in England. It was held on the same day as other local elections.

== Summary ==
=== Election result ===
2019 Harborough District Council election
Party	Candidates	Seats	Gains	Losses	Net gain/loss	Seats %	Votes %	Votes	+/−
Conservative	30	22	0	2	▼7	64.7	41.8	18,074	–5.2
Liberal Democrats	22	11	2	0	▲3	32.4	33.9	14,653	+4.3
Labour	23	1	0	0	▲1	2.9	15.3	6,617	+3.7
Green	5	0	0	0	Steady	0.0	4.7	2,030	±0.0
Independent	4	0	0	0	Steady	0.0	3.6	1,573	+1.8
UKIP	1	0	0	0	Steady	0.0	0.6	280	–4.4

== Ward results ==
=== Billesdon & Tilton ===
Billesdon & Tilton
Party	Candidate	Votes	%
Conservative	Sindy Modha	585	69.4
Liberal Democrats	Ian Lauder	209	24.8
Labour	Matt Smith	49	5.8
Majority			
Turnout		850	42.0
Conservative win (new seat)			

=== Bosworth ===
Bosworth
Party	Candidate	Votes	%	±%
Conservative	Amanda Nunn	522	71.0	
Labour	David Wenn	213	29.0	
Majority				
Turnout		775	34.6	
Conservative hold		Swing		

=== Broughton Astley - Primethorpe & Sutton ===
Broughton Astley - Primethorpe & Sutton
Party	Candidate	Votes	%
Conservative	Paul Dann	575	54.1
Conservative	Bill Liquorish	478	45.0
Green	Mark Green	383	36.1
Labour	Sandra Parkinson	276	26.0
Turnout		1,068	30.5
Conservative win (new seat)			
Conservative win (new seat)			

=== Broughton Astley South & Leire ===
Broughton Astley South & Leire
Party	Candidate	Votes	%
Liberal Democrats	Mark Graves	737	59.9
Conservative	Colin Golding	552	44.9
Conservative	Nigel Chapman	322	26.2
Labour	Paula McSorley	292	23.7
Turnout		1,262	32.2
Liberal Democrats win (new seat)			
Conservative win (new seat)			

=== Dunton ===
Dunton
Party	Candidate	Votes	%	±%
Conservative	Neil Bannister	577	77.4	
Labour	Elaine Carter	168	22.6	
Majority				
Turnout		770	37.0	
Conservative hold		Swing		

=== Fleckney ===
Fleckney
Party	Candidate	Votes	%	±%
Conservative	Charmain Wood	638	44.1	
Conservative	Stephen Bilbie	630	43.5	
Independent	Alan Birch	554	38.3	
Labour	Helen Morrison	290	20.0	
Labour	Di Elsom	256	17.7	
Liberal Democrats	Rachel McDonnell	219	15.1	
Turnout		1,461	33.5	
Conservative hold				
Conservative hold				

=== Glen ===
Glen
Party	Candidate	Votes	%	±%
Conservative	James Hallam	964	57.7	
Conservative	Rani Mahal	711	42.5	
Liberal Democrats	Stephanie Heimer	313	18.7	
Independent	Jeff Stephenson	265	15.8	
Liberal Democrats	Kevin Russell	238	14.2	
Green	Matthew Norton	232	13.9	
Labour	Doreen Masters	150	9.0	
Turnout		1,676	39.7	
Conservative hold				
Conservative hold				

=== Kibworths ===
Kibworths
Party	Candidate	Votes	%	±%
Conservative	Phil King	1,111	52.9	
Conservative	Robin Hollick	1,002	47.7	
Conservative	Simon Whelband	968	46.1	
Liberal Democrats	Carol Weaver	651	31.0	
Liberal Democrats	Joe Pole	614	29.2	
Independent	Stefan Richter	512	24.4	
Labour	Ben Miles	458	21.8	
Turnout		2,116	35.1	
Conservative hold				
Conservative hold				
Conservative hold				

=== Lubenham ===
Lubenham
Party	Candidate	Votes	%	±%
Conservative	Paul Bremner	359	60.2	
Liberal Democrats	James Lindsay	149	25.0	
Labour	Deborah Langham	88	14.8	
Majority				
Turnout		610	37.5	
Conservative hold		Swing		

=== Lutterworth East ===
Lutterworth East
Party	Candidate	Votes	%
Liberal Democrats	Martin Sarfas	491	35.9
Conservative	Janette Ackerley	480	35.1
Labour	David Gair	459	33.5
Labour	Liz Marsh	392	28.6
Conservative	Johnson Lyon	376	27.5
Liberal Democrats	Harry Wilkin	370	27.0
Turnout		1,392	37.2
Liberal Democrats win (new seat)			
Conservative win (new seat)			

=== Lutterworth West ===
Lutterworth West
Party	Candidate	Votes	%
Conservative	Geraldine Robinson	707	51.1
Labour	Paul Beadle	614	44.4
Conservative	Elaine Chapman	553	40.0
Labour	Rob Bevin	389	28.1
Turnout		1,426	37.7
Conservative win (new seat)			
Labour win (new seat)			

=== Market Harborough - Great Bowden & Arden ===
Market Harborough - Great Bowden & Arden
Party	Candidate	Votes	%	±%
Liberal Democrats	Phil Knowles	888	55.2	
Conservative	Barry Champion	545	33.9	
Conservative	Laura Cook	517	32.1	
Green	Mary Morgan	417	25.9	
Labour	Andy Thomas	288	17.9	
Labour	Anne Iliffe	241	15.0	
Turnout		1,635	37.2	
Liberal Democrats hold				
Conservative hold				

=== Market Harborough - Little Bowden ===
Market Harborough - Little Bowden
Party	Candidate	Votes	%	±%
Liberal Democrats	Peter James	740	51.3	
Conservative	Frankie McHugo	668	46.3	
Conservative	Derek Evans	609	42.2	
Labour	Jan Turner	429	29.8	
Turnout		1,471	34.6	
Liberal Democrats gain from Conservative				
Conservative hold				

=== Market Harborough - Logan ===
Market Harborough - Logan
Party	Candidate	Votes	%	±%
Liberal Democrats	Barbara Johnson	774	47.3	
Liberal Democrats	Dominic Fosker	635	38.8	
Conservative	Billy Hadkiss	587	35.9	
Green	James Ackerley	389	23.8	
Independent	Robin Lambert	242	14.8	
Labour	Rosemary Watson	198	12.1	
Turnout		1,644	38.8	
Liberal Democrats hold				
Liberal Democrats gain from Conservative				

=== Market Harborough - Welland ===
Market Harborough - Welland
Party	Candidate	Votes	%	±%
Liberal Democrats	Julie Simpson	861	44.6	
Liberal Democrats	Roger Dunton	856	44.3	
Conservative	Barry Frenchman	655	33.9	
Green	Darren Woodiwiss	609	31.5	
Conservative	Barry Walton	536	27.8	
Liberal Democrats	Stuart Finan	514	26.6	
Labour	Paul Gray	400	20.7	
Labour	Carlo Campbell-Follett	375	19.4	
Turnout		1,965	33.2	
Liberal Democrats hold				
Liberal Democrats hold				
Conservative hold				

=== Misterton ===
Misterton
Party	Candidate	Votes	%	±%
Conservative	Jonathan Bateman	432	52.4	
Liberal Democrats	Stephen Walkley	323	39.2	
Labour	Malcolm Maguire	70	8.5	
Turnout		847	41.5	
Conservative hold		Swing		

=== Nevill ===
Nevill
Party	Candidate	Votes	%	±%
Conservative	Michael Rickman	668	63.9	
Liberal Democrats	Grahame Hudson	377	36.1	
Turnout		1,076	48.3	
Conservative hold		Swing		

=== Thurnby & Houghton ===
Thurnby & Houghton
Party	Candidate	Votes	%	±%
Liberal Democrats	Simon Galton	1,774	72.6	
Liberal Democrats	Amanda Burrell	1,497	61.3	
Liberal Democrats	Peter Elliott	1,423	58.3	
Conservative	Lewis Foster	747	30.6	
UKIP	Julie Tregoning	280	11.5	
Labour	Carol Hopkinson	277	11.3	
Labour	Mel James	245	10.0	
Turnout		2,457	38.5	
Liberal Democrats hold				
Liberal Democrats hold				
Liberal Democrats hold				

=== Ullesthorpe ===
Ullesthorpe
Party	Candidate	Votes	%	±%
Conservative	Rosita Page	Uncontested	N/A	
Turnout		0	0.0	
Conservative hold		Swing		

== By-elections ==
=== Market Harborough - Little Bowden ===
Market Harborough - Little Bowden: 6 May 2021
Party	Candidate	Votes	%	±%
Conservative	Peter Critchley	727	40.9	
Liberal Democrats	James Ward	507	28.5	
Labour	Marie Panter	213	12.0	
Women's Equality	Clare Bottle	149	8.4	
Green	Mary Morgan	122	6.9	
Independent	Robin Lambert	61	3.4	
Majority		220	12.4	
Turnout		1,779	41.4	
Registered electors		4,297		
Conservative hold		Swing		

=== Market Harborough - Logan ===
Market Harborough - Logan: 29 September 2022
Party	Candidate	Votes	%	±%
Liberal Democrats	Geraldine Whitmore	582	45.7	
Conservative	Robin Cutsforth	382	30.0	
Labour	Maria Panter	250	19.6	
Independent	Robin Lambert	60	4.7	
Majority		200	15.7	
Turnout		1,274	30.6	
Registered electors		4,163		
Liberal Democrats hold		Swing		
