= Elaine Carter =

Elaine Carter may refer to:

- Elaine Carter, character, see John Carter (ER)
- Elaine Carter, character in Alias a Gentleman
- Elaine Carter (political candidate), in Harborough local elections
- Elaine Carter, character in Pacific Rendezvous
