= 2011 Harborough District Council election =

2011 UK local government election

The 2011 Harborough District Council election was held on Thursday 5 May 2011 to elect 37 members to Harborough District Council to a four-year term, the same day as other local elections in the United Kingdom. It was preceded by the 2007 Harborough District Council election and followed by the 2015 Harborough District Council election. The Conservative Party held control of the council after the election. The turnout across the entire council was 48.4%.

== Results summary ==
2011 Harborough District Council election
Party	Seats	Net gain/loss	Seats %	Votes %	Votes	+/−
Conservative	27	▲1	73.0			
Liberal Democrats	9	▼2	24.3			
Independent	1	▲1	2.7			
Labour	0	Steady	0.0			
UKIP	0	Steady	0.0			

== Ward results ==
=== Billesdon ===
Billesdon (1 seat)
Party	Candidate	Votes	%	±%
Conservative	Steve Charlish*	568	74.8	▼2.6
Liberal Democrats	Grahame Dudson	191	25.2	▲2.6
Majority		377	49.7	▼5.1
Total valid votes		759	98.6	
Rejected ballots		11	1.4	
Turnout		770	50.9	
Registered electors		1,514		
Conservative hold		Swing	▼2.6	

=== Bosworth ===
Bosworth (1 seat)
Party	Candidate	Votes	%	±%
Conservative	Brian Smith*	780	75.4	▲13.0
Labour	Hilary Craig	255	24.6	▲5.4
Majority		525	50.7	▲7.6
Total valid votes		1,035	98.8	
Rejected ballots		13	1.2	
Turnout		1,048	52.3	
Registered electors		2,002		
Conservative hold		Swing	▲3.8	

=== Broughton Astley - Astley ===
Broughton Astley - Astley (1 seat)
Party	Candidate	Votes	%	±%
Conservative	Mark Graves	490	76.3	▼8.6
Labour	Marea Roberts	152	23.7	▲8.6
Majority		338	52.6	▼17.3
Total valid votes		642	99.4	
Rejected ballots		4	0.6	
Turnout		646	38.6	
Registered electors		1,672		
Conservative hold		Swing	▼8.6	

=== Broughton Astley - Broughton ===
Broughton Astley - Broughton (1 seat)
Party	Candidate	Votes	%	±%
Conservative	Colin Golding (Note: Colin Golding unsuccessfully ran for this ward in the 2007 election as an independent candidate. The change in vote share number is calculated from the Conservative candidate in that election.)	624	71.3	▲6.1
Labour	David Smith	251	28.7	New
Majority		373	42.6	▲12.1
Total valid votes		875	98.4	
Rejected ballots		14	1.6	
Turnout		889	42.3	
Registered electors		2,103		
Conservative hold		Swing	▼11.3	

=== Broughton Astley - Primethorpe ===
Broughton Astley - Primethorpe (1 seat)
Party	Candidate	Votes	%	±%
Conservative	Paul Dann*	449	71.5	▼3.5
Labour	Sandra Parkinson	179	28.5	▲3.5
Majority		270	43.0	▼7.0
Total valid votes		628	99.5	
Rejected ballots		3	0.5	
Turnout		631	44.6	
Registered electors		1,414		
Conservative hold		Swing	▼3.5	

=== Broughton Astley - Sutton ===
Broughton Astley - Sutton (1 seat)
Party	Candidate	Votes	%	±%
Conservative	Bill Liquorish*	421	69.2	▼6.2
Labour	Peter Ranson	187	30.8	▲6.2
Majority		234	38.5	▼12.4
Total valid votes		608	98.9	
Rejected ballots		7	1.1	
Turnout		615	39.3	
Registered electors		1,566		
Conservative hold		Swing	▼6.2	

=== Dunton ===
Dunton (1 seat)
Party	Candidate	Votes	%	±%
Conservative	Neil Bannister	697	75.0	▼25.0
Labour	Amanda Holyoak	232	25.0	New
Majority		465	50.1	N/A
Total valid votes		929	99.5	
Rejected ballots		5	0.5	
Turnout		934	49.9	
Registered electors		1,872		
Conservative hold		Swing	▼25.0	

=== Fleckney ===
Fleckney (2 seats)
Party	Candidate	Votes	%	±%
Conservative	Charmaine Wood*	794		
Independent	Alan Birch	623		
Independent	Mike Smith* (Note: Mike Smith was elected to the Fleckney ward in 2007 as the Conservative candidate.)	489		New
Conservative	Rani Mahal	458		
Liberal Democrats	Stephen Bilbie	304		
Liberal Democrats	David Johnson	195		
Total valid votes				
Rejected ballots		19		
Turnout				
Registered electors		3,756		
Conservative hold				
Independent gain from Conservative				

=== Glen ===
Glen (2 seats)
Party	Candidate	Votes	%	±%
Conservative	James Hallam	1,293		
Conservative	Grahame Spendlove-Mason*	1,208		
Liberal Democrats	Alan Morris	329		
Liberal Democrats	John Pearse	304		
Total valid votes				
Rejected ballots		42		
Turnout				
Registered electors		3,477		
Conservative hold				
Conservative hold				

=== Kibworth ===
Kibworth (3 seats)
Party	Candidate	Votes	%	±%
Conservative	Christopher Holyoak*	1,417		
Conservative	Lynne Beesley-Reynolds	1,274		
Conservative	Phillip King*	1,191		
Liberal Democrats	Eileen Roeber	1,094		
Liberal Democrats	Amanda Churchill	859		
Liberal Democrats	Dean Stocks	813		
Total valid votes				
Rejected ballots		60		
Turnout				
Registered electors		5,254		
Conservative hold				
Conservative gain from Liberal Democrats				
Conservative hold				

=== Lubenham ===
Lubenham (1 seat)
Party	Candidate	Votes	%	±%
Conservative	Blake Pain*	515	63.3	▲2.9
Liberal Democrats	Peter James	298	36.7	▼2.9
Majority		217	26.7	▲5.8
Total valid votes		813	96.8	
Rejected ballots		27	3.2	
Turnout		840	46.9	
Registered electors		1,790		
Conservative hold		Swing	▲2.9	

=== Lutterworth Brookfield ===
Lutterworth Brookfield (1 seat)
Party	Candidate	Votes	%	±%
Conservative	Richard Tomlin	385	42.2	▲3.3
Independent	Bill Piper	273	29.9	New
Labour	Michael Orpin	255	27.9	▲18.1
Majority		112	12.3	N/A
Total valid votes		913	98.5	
Rejected ballots		14	1.5	
Turnout		927	50.0	
Registered electors		1,854		
Conservative gain from Liberal Democrats		Swing		

=== Lutterworth Orchard ===
Lutterworth Orchard (1 seat)
Party	Candidate	Votes	%	±%
Conservative	Geraldine Robinson*	504	62.1	▼11.0
Labour	Paul Gray	308	37.9	▲11.0
Majority		196	24.1	▼22.0
Total valid votes		812	99.6	
Rejected ballots		3	0.4	
Turnout		815	49.0	
Registered electors		1,662		
Conservative hold		Swing	▼11.0	

=== Lutterworth Springs ===
Lutterworth Springs (1 seat)
Party	Candidate	Votes	%	±%
Conservative	Richard Dewes*	384	46.3	▼15.4
Labour	David Gair	227	27.3	▼11.0
Independent	Martin Sears	219	26.4	New
Majority		157	18.9	▼4.4
Total valid votes		830	99.9	
Rejected ballots		1	0.1	
Turnout		831	46.6	
Registered electors		1,785		
Conservative hold		Swing	▼2.2	

=== Lutterworth Swift ===
Lutterworth Swift (1 seat)
Party	Candidate	Votes	%	±%
Conservative	Janette Ackerley*	424	49.8	▼7.4
Labour	Tristan Koriya	289	34.0	▼8.8
Independent	Clive Weston	138	16.2	New
Majority		135	15.9	▲1.3
Total valid votes		851	98.8	
Rejected ballots		10	1.2	
Turnout		861	47.7	
Registered electors		1,805		
Conservative hold		Swing	▲0.7	

=== Market Harborough - Great Bowden and Arden ===
Market Harborough - Great Bowden and Arden (3 seats)
Party	Candidate	Votes	%	±%
Liberal Democrats	Sarah Hill*	1,514		
Liberal Democrats	Phil Knowles (Note: Phil Knowles was elected in a 28 January 2010 by-election following the resignation of Conservative member Alistair Swatridge.)	1,397		
Liberal Democrats	Barbara Johnson*	1,308		
Conservative	Fred Brown	1,046		
UKIP	Michael Gerard	509		
Total valid votes				
Rejected ballots		46		
Turnout				
Registered electors		5,660		
Liberal Democrats hold				
Liberal Democrats gain from Conservative				
Liberal Democrats hold				

=== Market Harborough - Little Bowden ===
Market Harborough - Little Bowden (2 seats)
Party	Candidate	Votes	%	±%
Conservative	Derek Evans*	906		
Conservative	Francesca McHugo	818		
Liberal Democrats	Sarah Clarke	797		
Liberal Democrats	Andy Johnson	738		
Total valid votes				
Rejected ballots		61		
Turnout				
Registered electors		3,803		
Conservative hold				
Conservative hold				

=== Market Harborough - Logan ===
Market Harborough - Logan (2 seats)
Party	Candidate	Votes	%	±%
Liberal Democrats	Peter Callis*	734		
Conservative	Paul Bremner*	729		
Liberal Democrats	Chris Etherington	609		
Conservative	Richard Hadkiss	508		
Labour	Ian Snaith	230		
Labour	Alan Haylock	220		
Independent	Andrew Vincent	98		
Total valid votes				
Rejected ballots		7		
Turnout				
Registered electors		3,288		
Liberal Democrats hold				
Conservative hold				

=== Market Harborough - Welland ===
Market Harborough - Welland (3 seats)
Party	Candidate	Votes	%	±%
Liberal Democrats	Julie Simpson*	847		
Liberal Democrats	Roger Dunton*	843		
Conservative	Jo Brodrick	818		
Conservative	Roger Hook	732		
Liberal Democrats	Colin Davies	700		
Labour	Annie Moelwyn-Hughes	467		
Labour	Martin Willey	373		
Total valid votes				
Rejected ballots		26		
Turnout				
Registered electors		4,991		
Liberal Democrats hold				
Liberal Democrats hold				
Conservative gain from Liberal Democrats				

=== Misterton ===
Misterton (1 seat)
Party	Candidate	Votes	%	±%
Conservative	John Everett*	825	77.3	▼22.7
Labour	Terence Cane	242	22.7	New
Majority		583	54.64	N/A
Total valid votes		1,067	98.3	
Rejected ballots		18	1.7	
Turnout		1,085	53.5	
Registered electors		2,028		
Conservative hold		Swing	▼22.7	

=== Nevill ===
Nevill (1 seat)
Party	Candidate	Votes	%	±%
Conservative	David Beaty*	680	72.6	▼5.8
Liberal Democrats	Mary Twidell	256	27.4	▲5.8
Majority		424	45.3	▼11.5
Total valid votes		936	96.9	
Rejected ballots		30	3.1	
Turnout		966	53.1	
Registered electors		1,820		
Conservative hold		Swing	▼5.8	

=== Peatling ===
Peatling (1 seat)
Party	Candidate	Votes	%	±%
Conservative	Neville Hall	757	72.9	Steady
Labour	Elaine Carter	282	27.1	▲14.6
Majority		475	45.7	▼12.5
Total valid votes		1,039	99.5	
Rejected ballots		5	0.5	
Turnout		1,044	54.5	
Registered electors		1,915		
Conservative hold		Swing	▼7.3	

=== Thurnby and Houghton ===
Thurnby and Houghton (3 seats)
Party	Candidate	Votes	%	±%
Liberal Democrats	Simon Galton*	2,070		
Liberal Democrats	Amanda Burrell*	1,480		
Liberal Democrats	Jan Tooley*	1,334		
Conservative	Pat Chamberlain	1,104		
Total valid votes				
Rejected ballots		54		
Turnout				
Registered electors		5,697		
Liberal Democrats hold				
Liberal Democrats hold				
Liberal Democrats hold				

=== Tilton ===
Tilton (1 seat)
Party	Candidate	Votes	%	±%
Conservative	Mike Rook*	Unopposed		
Registered electors		1,663		
Conservative hold				

=== Ullesthorpe ===
Ullesthorpe (1 seat)
Party	Candidate	Votes	%	±%
Conservative	Rosita Page*	691	76.6	▼23.4
Labour	Nicholas Stanhope	211	23.4	New
Majority		480	53.2	N/A
Total valid votes		902	99.0	
Rejected ballots		9	1.0	
Turnout		911	52.4	
Registered electors		1,737		
Conservative hold		Swing	▼23.4	
