= 2023 Harborough District Council election =

Local election in England

- 4 May 2023

All 34 seats to Harborough District Council 18 seats needed for a majority

	First party	Second party
Leader	Phillip King	Phil Knowles
Party	Conservative	Liberal Democrats
Last election	22 seats, 41.8%	11 seats, 33.9%
Seats won	15	13
Seat change	▼7	▲2
Popular vote	16,603	17,526
Percentage	34.1%	36.0%
Swing	▼7.7%	▲2.1%
	Third party	Fourth party
Party	Labour	Green
Last election	1 seat, 15.3%	0 seats, 4.7%
Seats won	3	3
Seat change	▲2	▲3
Popular vote	7,511	6,345
Percentage	15.4%	13.0%
Swing	▲0.1%	▲8.3%
- Winner of each seat at the 2023 Harborough District Council election
Leader before election
Phillip King
Conservative
Leader after election
Phil Knowles
Liberal Democrat
No overall control

The 2023 Harborough District Council election took place on 4 May 2023 to elect members of the Harborough District Council in Leicestershire, England. It was held on the same day as other local elections across England.

The Conservative Party lost control of the council after losing seven seats in the election. After the elections the Conservative leader Phil King resigned. A joint Liberal Democrat, Labour and Green administration took power at the first meeting of the newly elected council on 15 May 2023, with Phil Knowles becoming Leader.

== Results summary ==
2023 Harborough District Council election
Party	Candidates	Seats	Gains	Losses	Net gain/loss	Seats %	Votes %	Votes	+/−
Conservative	31	15	0	7	▼7	44.1	34.1	16,603	–7.7
Liberal Democrats	34	13	4	2	▲2	38.2	36.0	17,526	+2.1
Labour	26	3	2	0	▲2	8.8	15.4	7,511	+0.1
Green	30	3	3	0	▲3	8.8	13.0	6,345	+8.3
Independent	3	0	0	0	Steady	0.0	1.2	570	–2.4
Reform	1	0	0	0	Steady	0.0	0.2	110	N/A

== Ward results ==
Harborough District Council election result.

Sitting councillors are marked with an asterisk (*).

=== Billesdon & Tilton ===
Billesdon & Tilton
Party	Candidate	Votes	%	±%
Conservative	Sindy Modha*	377	50.5	−18.9
Liberal Democrats	Ian Hill	238	31.9	+7.1
Green	Sarah Recordon	131	17.6	New
Majority		139	18.6	−26.0
Turnout		746	37	−5
Conservative hold		Swing	-13.0	

=== Bosworth ===
Bosworth
Party	Candidate	Votes	%	±%
Conservative	Amanda Nunn*	443	52.5	−18.5
Labour	Peter Houtman	196	23.2	−5.8
Liberal Democrats	John Wood	107	12.7	New
Green	Katherine Ruhl	98	11.6	New
Majority		247	29.3	−12.7
Turnout		844	34	−0.6
Conservative hold		Swing	-6.3	

=== Broughton Astley - Primethorpe & Sutton ===
Broughton Astley - Primethorpe & Sutton (2 seats)
Party	Candidate	Votes	%	±%
Conservative	Paul Dann*	465	48.7	−5.4
Conservative	Clive Grafton-Reed	458	48.0	+3.0
Labour	Sandra Parkinson	186	19.5	−6.5
Liberal Democrats	Joshua Graves	177	18.6	N/A
Liberal Democrats	David Beasley	173	18.1	N/A
Labour	Sue Maguire	147	15.4	N/A
Green	Mark Green	124	13.0	−23.1
Green	Gillian Buswell	93	9.7	N/A
Turnout		954	26	−4.5
Conservative hold				
Conservative hold				

=== Broughton Astley South & Leire ===
Broughton Astley South & Leire (2 seats)
Party	Candidate	Votes	%	±%
Conservative	Joshua Worrell	479	44.9	±0.0
Liberal Democrats	Mark Graves*	459	43.1	−16.8
Liberal Democrats	Janet Rogers	400	37.5	N/A
Labour	Julia Gardner	172	16.1	−7.6
Labour	Malcolm Maguire	112	10.5	N/A
Green	Christopher Cooper-Hayes	76	7.1	N/A
Green	Adam Holmes	62	5.8	N/A
Turnout		1,066	27	
Conservative hold				
Liberal Democrats hold				

=== Dunton ===
Dunton
Party	Candidate	Votes	%	±%
Conservative	Neil Bannister*	526	62.5	−14.9
Labour	Maria Lee	194	23.0	+0.4
Liberal Democrats	Colin Porter	121	14.4	New
Majority		332	39.5	−15.3
Turnout		841	41	+4.0
Conservative hold		Swing	-7.6	

=== Fleckney ===
Fleckney (2 seats)
Party	Candidate	Votes	%	±%
Conservative	Stephen Bilbie*	613	41.4	−2.1
Liberal Democrats	Alan Birch	504	34.1	+19.0
Conservative	Andrea Charlton	471	31.8	−12.3
Labour	Brian Browne	284	19.2	−0.8
Liberal Democrats	Jeffrey Stephenson	253	17.1	N/A
Independent	Charmaine Wood	253	17.1	−27.0
Green	Mandy Sanders	239	16.1	N/A
Green	Jessie Jenkins	158	10.7	N/A
Turnout		1,480	33	−0.5
Conservative hold				
Liberal Democrats gain from Conservative				

=== Glen ===
Glen (2 seats)
Party	Candidate	Votes	%	±%
Conservative	James Hallam*	864	58.3	+0.6
Conservative	Rani Mahal*	758	51.1	+8.6
Liberal Democrats	Mark Dilkes	436	29.4	+10.7
Liberal Democrats	Donna Barnett	405	27.3	+13.1
Green	Matthew Norton	216	14.6	+0.7
Green	Stephen Rankine	170	11.5	N/A
Turnout		1,482	34	−5.7
Conservative hold				
Conservative hold				

=== Kibworths ===
Kibworths (3 seats)
Party	Candidate	Votes	%	±%
Conservative	Phil King*	951	44.7	−8.2
Conservative	Robin Hollick*	945	44.4	−3.3
Conservative	Simon Whelband*	801	37.7	−8.4
Liberal Democrats	Chris Graves	744	35.0	+5.8
Liberal Democrats	Carol Weaver	558	26.2	−4.8
Liberal Democrats	James Lindsay	516	24.3	N/A
Green	Erika Cudworth	470	22.1	N/A
Labour	Elaine Carter	392	18.4	−3.4
Green	Debbie James	298	14.0	N/A
Green	Brian Thompson	186	8.7	N/A
Turnout		2,126	33	−2.1
Conservative hold				
Conservative hold				
Conservative hold				

=== Lubenham ===
Lubenham
Party	Candidate	Votes	%	±%
Liberal Democrats	Jo Asher	391	46.2	+21.2
Conservative	Paul Bremner*	374	44.2	−16.0
Green	Phil Harding	81	9.6	New
Majority		17	2.0	N/A
Turnout		846	39	+1.5
Liberal Democrats gain from Conservative		Swing	+18.6	

=== Lutterworth East ===
Lutterworth East (2 seats)
Party	Candidate	Votes	%	±%
Labour	David Gair	527	40.5	+7.0
Liberal Democrats	Martin Sarfas*	497	38.2	+2.3
Conservative	Laurence Sharma	367	28.2	−6.9
Labour	Edward MacIntyre	351	27.0	−1.6
Liberal Democrats	Mary Morgan	239	18.4	−8.6
Green	Douglas Taylor	126	9.7	N/A
Reform	Bill Piper	110	8.5	N/A
Turnout		1,301	34	−3.2
Labour gain from Conservative				
Liberal Democrats hold				

=== Lutterworth West ===
Lutterworth West (2 seats)
Party	Candidate	Votes	%	±%
Labour	Paul Beadle*	684	47.5	+3.1
Labour	Jim Knight	633	44.0	+15.9
Conservative	Annette Willcox	527	36.6	−14.5
Green	Carl Tiivas	220	15.3	N/A
Liberal Democrats	Carol Mayne	152	10.6	N/A
Liberal Democrats	Sue Graves	145	10.1	N/A
Turnout		1,439	36	−1.7
Labour hold				
Labour gain from Conservative				

=== Market Harborough - Great Bowden & Arden ===
Market Harborough - Great Bowden & Arden (2 seats)
Party	Candidate	Votes	%	±%
Liberal Democrats	Phil Knowles*	899	52.4	−2.8
Liberal Democrats	Buddy Anderson	740	43.1	N/A
Conservative	Barry Champion*	474	27.6	−6.3
Conservative	Charles Hawes	360	21.0	−11.1
Labour	Andy Thomas	283	16.5	−1.4
Labour	David Wenn	182	10.6	−4.4
Green	Mary Morgan	157	9.2	−16.7
Green	Richard Ansell	144	8.4	N/A
Turnout		1,715	38	+0.8
Liberal Democrats hold				
Liberal Democrats gain from Conservative				

=== Market Harborough - Little Bowden ===
Market Harborough - Little Bowden (2 seats)
Party	Candidate	Votes	%	±%
Liberal Democrats	Peter James*	641	38.4	−12.9
Liberal Democrats	Stuart Finan	587	35.1	N/A
Conservative	Peter Critchley*	502	30.1	−16.2
Conservative	David Page	465	27.8	−14.4
Labour	Maria Panter	270	16.2	−13.6
Labour	Peter Whalen	245	14.7	N/A
Independent	Clare Bottle	222	13.3	N/A
Green	Daniella Orsini	172	10.3	N/A
Green	Carlos Bilbao Elguezabal	139	8.3	N/A
Turnout		1,670	39	+4.4
Liberal Democrats hold				
Liberal Democrats gain from Conservative				

=== Market Harborough - Logan ===
Market Harborough - Logan (2 seats)
Party	Candidate	Votes	%	±%
Liberal Democrats	Barbara Johnson*	804	51.0	+3.7
Liberal Democrats	Geraldine Whitmore*	706	44.8	+6.0
Conservative	Robin Cutforth	467	29.6	−6.3
Conservative	Sophie Smith	343	21.8	N/A
Labour	Louise Phipps	213	13.5	N/A
Labour	Rosemary Watson	172	10.9	−1.2
Green	Simon Shepley	132	8.4	−15.4
Green	Jennifer Wroath	111	7.0	N/A
Independent	Robin Lambert	95	6.0	−8.8
Turnout		1,576	37	−1.8
Liberal Democrats hold				
Liberal Democrats hold				

=== Market Harborough - Welland ===
Market Harborough - Welland (3 seats)
Party	Candidate	Votes	%	±%
Green	Darren Woodiwiss	822	39.1	+7.6
Green	Rose Foreman	661	31.4	N/A
Green	Lynne Taylor	657	31.3	N/A
Liberal Democrats	Roger Dunton*	649	30.9	−13.4
Liberal Democrats	Jo Chambers	589	28.0	−16.6
Conservative	Corrine Green	514	24.5	−9.4
Liberal Democrats	Marion Lewis	472	22.5	−4.1
Conservative	Aiden Perks	471	22.4	−5.4
Conservative	Francesca McHugo	447	21.3	N/A
Labour	Marie Panter	287	13.7	−5.7
Labour	Angela Brown	277	13.2	N/A
Labour	Paul Gray	265	12.6	−8.1
Turnout		2,102	33	−0.2
Green gain from Liberal Democrats				
Green gain from Liberal Democrats				
Green gain from Conservative				

=== Misterton ===
Misterton
Party	Candidate	Votes	%	±%
Conservative	Jonathan Bateman*	409	41.3	−11.1
Liberal Democrats	Stephen Walkley	374	37.7	−1.5
Labour	Liz Marsh	150	15.1	+6.6
Green	Jonathan Hopkins	58	5.9	New
Majority		35	3.6	−9.6
Turnout		991	42	+0.5
Conservative hold		Swing	-4.8	

=== Nevill ===
Nevill
Party	Candidate	Votes	%	±%
Conservative	Michael Rickman*	585	66.2	+2.3
Liberal Democrats	Philip Kaufman	186	21.0	−15.1
Green	Suzanne Lloyd	113	12.8	New
Majority		399	45.2	+17.4
Turnout		884	39	−9.3
Conservative hold		Swing	+8.7	

=== Thurnby & Houghton ===
Thurnby & Houghton (3 seats)
Party	Candidate	Votes	%	±%
Liberal Democrats	Simon Galton*	1,579	61.5	−11.1
Liberal Democrats	Amanda Burrell*	1,357	52.9	−8.4
Liberal Democrats	Peter Elliott*	1,319	51.4	−6.9
Conservative	Riby Gill	607	23.7	−6.9
Conservative	Nic Olsen	537	20.9	N/A
Conservative	Zaheer Joossab	486	18.9	N/A
Labour	Carol Hopkinson	367	14.3	+3.0
Labour	Ahmad Khwaja	351	13.7	+3.7
Labour	Matt Smith	347	13.5	N/A
Green	Melanie Wakley	179	7.0	N/A
Green	Martyn Gower	174	6.8	N/A
Turnout		2,566	36	−2.5
Liberal Democrats hold				
Liberal Democrats hold				
Liberal Democrats hold				

=== Ullesthorpe ===
Ullesthorpe
Party	Candidate	Votes	%	±%
Conservative	Rosita Page*	517	55.7	N/A
Labour	Ian Millington	224	24.1	New
Liberal Democrats	John Gurnett	109	11.7	New
Green	Sarah Nimmo	78	8.4	New
Majority		293	31.6	N/A
Turnout		928	39	N/A
Conservative hold		Swing	N/A	

== By-elections ==
=== Market Harborough - Logan ===
Market Harborough - Logan by-election: 17 July 2025
Party	Candidate	Votes	%	±%
Conservative	Paul Bremner	410	31.3	+4.0
Liberal Democrats	Roger Dunton	355	27.1	–19.9
Green	Jake Bolton	290	22.2	+14.5
Reform	Jonathan Austin	190	14.5	N/A
Labour	Bridget Fitzpatrick	44	3.4	–9.0
Independent	Robin Lambert	10	0.8	–4.8
Communist	Peter Whalen	9	0.7	N/A
Majority		55	4.2	N/A
Turnout		1,309	29.4	–7.6
Registered electors		4,459		
Conservative gain from Liberal Democrats		Swing	▲12.0	

=== Fleckney ===
Fleckney by-election: 6 November 2025
Party	Candidate	Votes	%	±%
Reform	Jonathan Austin	551	35.0	N/A
Liberal Democrats	Stephen Walkley	453	28.7	+2.1
Conservative	Peter Critchley	416	26.4	–6.0
Green	Jessie Jenkins	102	6.5	–6.1
Labour	Helen Morrison	54	3.4	–11.6
Majority		98	6.3	N/A
Turnout		1,580	32.2	–0.8
Registered electors		4,906		
Reform gain from Conservative				

=== Market Harborough - Logan ===
Market Harborough - Logan by-election: 18 December 2025
Party	Candidate	Votes	%	±%
Conservative	David John Page	461	34.7	+3.4
Green	Jake Bolton	358	26.9	+4.7
Liberal Democrats	Marion Ann Lewis	268	20.2	−6.9
Reform	Barry Reginald George Walton	195	14.7	+0.2
Labour	Deborah Mary Bennett	43	3.2	+0.2
SDP	Robin Lambert	4	0.3	−0.5
Majority		103	7.8	+3.6
Turnout		1,329	30.3	+0.9
Registered electors		4,373		
Conservative gain from Liberal Democrats		Swing		
