= 2015 Harborough District Council election =

2015 UK local government election

Results of the 2015 Harborough District Council election

The 2015 Harborough District Council election took place on 7 May 2015 to elect members of the Harborough District Council in England. It was held on the same day as other local elections.

== Ward results ==
Sitting councillors are marked with an asterisk (*).

=== Billesdon ===
Billesdon
Party	Candidate	Votes	%	±%
Conservative	Sindy Modha	unopposed	N/A	N/A
Conservative hold				

=== Bosworth ===
Bosworth
Party	Candidate	Votes	%	±%
Conservative	Lesley Anne Bowles	unopposed	N/A	N/A
Conservative hold				

=== Broughton Astley–Astley ===
Broughton Astley – Astley
Party	Candidate	Votes	%	±%
Conservative	Mark Graves *	unopposed	N/A	N/A
Conservative hold				

=== Broughton Astley–Broughton ===
Broughton Astley–Broughton
Party	Candidate	Votes	%	±%
Conservative	Richard Martyn Tomlin	1,177	75.2	+3.9
Labour	Sandra Parkinson	389	24.8	–3.9
Majority		788	50.3	+7.7
Turnout		1,581	73.43	
Registered electors		2,153		
Conservative hold		Swing		

=== Broughton Astley–Primethorpe ===
Broughton Astley–Primethorpe
Party	Candidate	Votes	%	±%
Conservative	Paul John Dann *	705	74.6	+3.1
Labour	David Winn	240	25.4	–3.1
Majority		465	49.2	+6.2
Turnout		958	70.34	
Registered electors		1,362		
Conservative hold		Swing		

=== Broughton Astley–Sutton ===
Broughton Astley–Sutton
Party	Candidate	Votes	%	±%
Conservative	William Liquorish *	737	71.8	+2.6
Labour	Paul Michael Maglione	289	28.2	–2.6
Majority		448	43.6	+5.1
Turnout		1,054	67.87	
Registered electors		1,553		
Conservative hold		Swing		

=== Dunton ===
Dunton
Party	Candidate	Votes	%	±%
Conservative	Neil Durban Bannister *	1,130	81.9	+6.9
Labour	Malcolm James Maguire	250	18.1	–6.9
Majority		880	63.9	+13.8
Turnout		1,397	77.40	
Registered electors		1,805		
Conservative hold		Swing		

=== Fleckney ===
Fleckney (2 seats)
Party	Candidate	Votes	%	±%
Conservative	Charmaine Wood *	1,328	52.3	+6.2
Conservative	Stephen Alexander Bilbie	1,262	–	
Independent	Alan James Birch *	1,211	47.7	+11.5
Turnout		2,687	71.50	
Registered electors		3,758		
Conservative hold		Swing		
Conservative gain from Independent		Swing		

=== Glen ===
Glen (2 seats)
Party	Candidate	Votes	%	±%
Conservative	James John Hallam *	unopposed	N/A	N/A
Conservative	Graham David Spendlove-Mason *	unopposed	N/A	N/A
Conservative hold				
Conservative hold				

=== Kibworth ===
Kibworth (3 seats)
Party	Candidate	Votes	%	±%
Conservative	Lynne Marguerite Beesley-Reynolds *	2,500	53.5	–2.9
Conservative	Christopher Holyoak	2,438	–	
Conservative	Phillip Neil Scott King	2,121	–	
Liberal Democrats	Dean Robert Stocks	1,247	26.7	–16.9
Labour	Peter John Craig	927	19.8	N/A
Labour	Edward John Masters	785	–	
Turnout		4,341	74.86	
Registered electors		5,799		
Conservative hold		Swing		
Conservative hold		Swing		
Conservative hold		Swing		

=== Lubenham ===
Lubenham
Party	Candidate	Votes	%	±%
Conservative	Blake Lewis Pain *	698	52.6	–10.7
Liberal Democrats	Annette Deacon	408	30.7	–6.0
UKIP	Richard Alan Billington	222	16.7	N/A
Majority		290	22.0	–4.7
Turnout		1,341	73.20	
Registered electors		1,832		
Conservative hold		Swing		
