= Waltham on the Wolds railway station =

Former railway station in Leicestershire, England

Coordinates: 52.8318°N 0.8158°W

Waltham on the Wolds
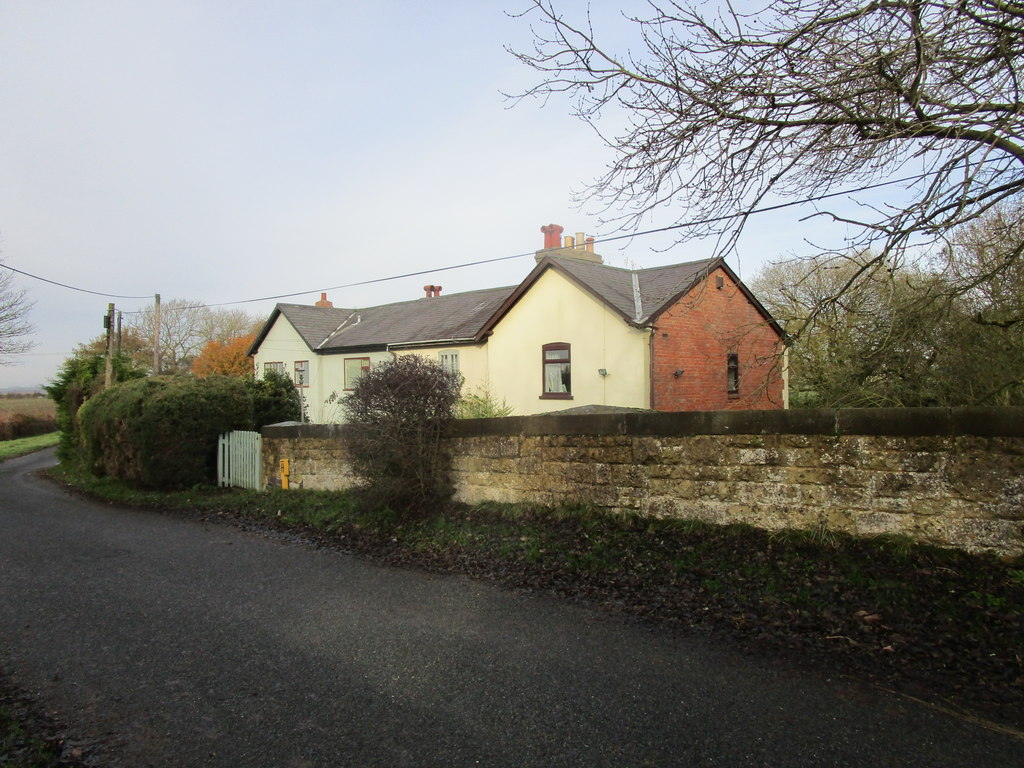
- The site of the station in 2019

General information
- Location: Waltham on the Wolds, Leicestershire; England
- Grid reference: SK798267
- Platforms: 1

Other information
- Status: Disused

History
- Pre-grouping: Great Northern Railway
- Post-grouping: LNER

Key dates
- 1883: Opened for freight and special trains
- 4 May 1964: Closed completely

Waltham on the Wolds railway station was a railway station at the end of the Waltham Branch, serving the village of Waltham on the Wolds, Leicestershire. The Waltham Branch was built by the Great Northern Railway from the Great Northern and London and North Western Joint Railway at Scalford to exploit ironstone deposits in the area.

The station opened in April 1883 but never had a regular passenger train service, which was confirmed in the edition of The Railway Magazine published in May 1932.

Instead, it was used only for specials bringing visitors to Waltham Fair or to race meetings at Croxton Park until at least 1907 or 1906.

The Eaton Branch Railway began at "Eaton Junction" immediately south of the station. It served the ironstone quarries that surrounded the village of Eaton.

From 1916 to 1918, the line was used for military specials serving Harrowby Army Camp, after which it was used for freight or occasional enthusiast specials, until completely closed in 1964.

Former Services

Preceding station	Disused railways	Following station
Terminus	Great Northern Railway; GNR	Scalford
