= Waltham on the Wolds =

Village in Leicestershire, England

Coordinates: 52.821129°N 0.804534°W

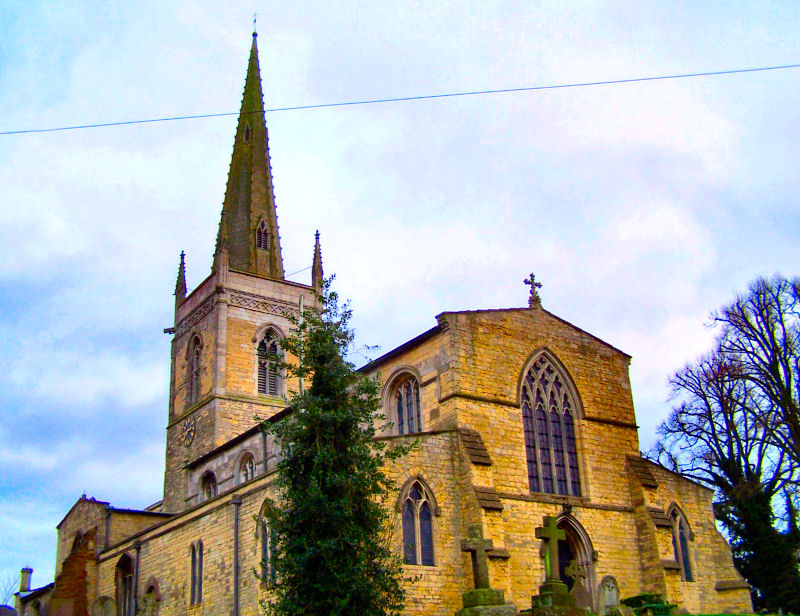
- The parish church of St Mary Magdalene

- Location within Leicestershire
- Population: 967 (2011)
- OS grid reference: SK805255
- Civil parish: Waltham on the Wolds and Thorpe Arnold
- District: Melton
- Shire county: Leicestershire
- Region: East Midlands
- Country: England
- Sovereign state: United Kingdom
- Post town: MELTON MOWBRAY
- Postcode district: LE14
- Dialling code: 01664
- Police: Leicestershire
- Fire: Leicestershire
- Ambulance: East Midlands
- UK Parliament: Melton and Syston

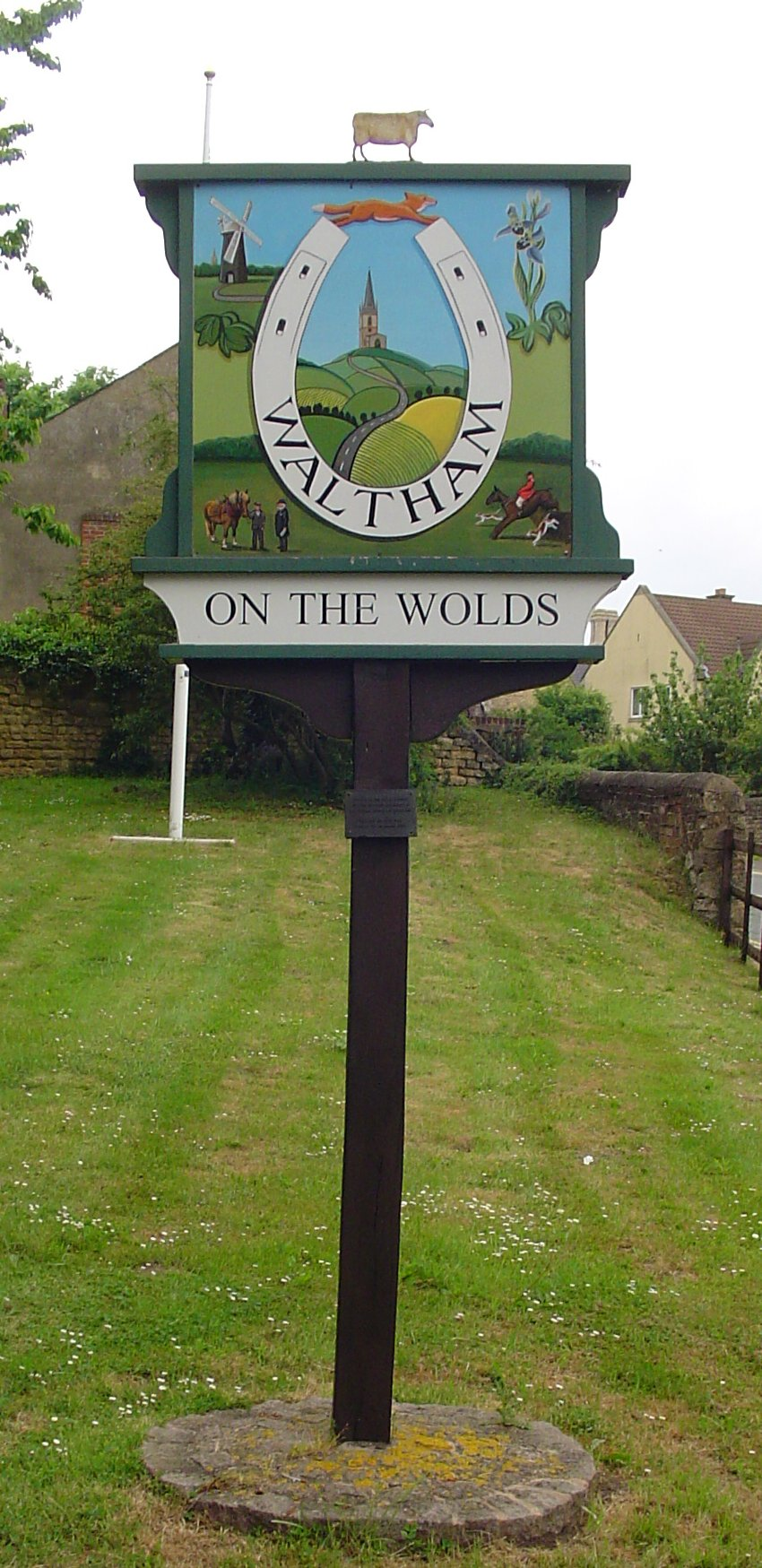
Village sign in Waltham on the Wolds

Waltham on the Wolds is a village in the civil parish of Waltham on the Wolds and Thorpe Arnold, in the Melton borough of Leicestershire, England. It lies about 5 miles (8.0 km) north-east of Melton Mowbray and 11 miles (17.7 km) south-west of Grantham on the main A607 road. The population of Waltham on the Wolds and Thorpe Arnold was 967 in 2011.

== Geography ==
The parish is the site of Waltham television transmitting station, which serves most of the East Midlands. Apart from the main village, the parish includes the village of Thorpe Arnold, just to the north-east of Melton. To the south-east is Stonesby, which is nearer to the 1,033 ft (315 m) transmitter. The village is on a ridge, which has an escarpment close to the north-west that dramatically overlooks the Vale of Belvoir.

== History ==
One of the earliest mentions of this place is in the Domesday Book of 1086, where it is listed among lands given to Hugh de Grandmesnil by the King. There were 100 acres (0.40 km^{2}) of meadow and land for 11 ploughs. It was valued at six pounds.

The village had a railway station 1 mile (1.6 km) north of the village, which opened in 1883 on a branch line from Scalford, but was used only occasionally by passenger trains for special occasions, such as events at Croxton Park. The station was a terminus, and there was no regular passenger service. The line was owned by GNR and was used mainly by iron ore trains from quarries near Knipton, Eaton and Branston. The remains of the line are still visible. There was a trailing junction with the Eaton Branch Railway (opened in 1884) to the south west of the station. The ore trains came off this branch and then reversed before travelling to Scalford.

In 1931 the parish had a population of 510. On 1 April 1936 the parish was abolished and merged with Thorpe Arnold to form "Waltham".

== Quarries ==
Two iron-ore quarries were operated at Waltham briefly in the 1880s. One was begun in 1882 by the Waltham Iron Ore Company either side of what is now the A607 north of the village. The other was further north in the northern angle between the A607 and the narrow road to Eaton. Both quarries closed in 1885. Each had a horse-drawn narrow-gauge tramway which carried the ore to the railway. The more southerly of the two quarries may have possessed a steam locomotive. Nothing can now be seen of the two quarries except (in 1992) the stone parapets of a bridge under the A607. This was used by the more southerly of the two tramways.

There was a quarry close to the railway, which was worked for limestone between 1931 and 1941.

== Pet nutrition ==
Waltham is also known for its connection with Mars (previously Masterfoods UK), and the Waltham Centre for Pet Nutrition which carries out research into the effect of diet on cats, dogs and horses (for Spillers).

== Amenities ==
The parish church, dedicated to St Mary Magdalene, is built of a local, honey-coloured ironstone used for several churches in the district (e. g. at South Croxton). On 27 February 2008, the church spire was badly damaged by the 2008 Lincolnshire earthquake. The top 30 ft (9.1 m) of it had to be rebuilt, at an estimated cost of some £100,000. The work was completed in 2009. The church contains some Norman features, with much building from about 1300. It was restored and extended in 1850, when the supervising architect was George Gilbert Scott.

The Church of England primary school has a pre-school attached. It received a grade of outstanding in a 2011 inspection by Ofsted.

The one surviving pub in the village, the Royal Horseshoes, is in Melton Road. It was refurbished in 2010 and also provides meals and accommodation.

== Gallery ==
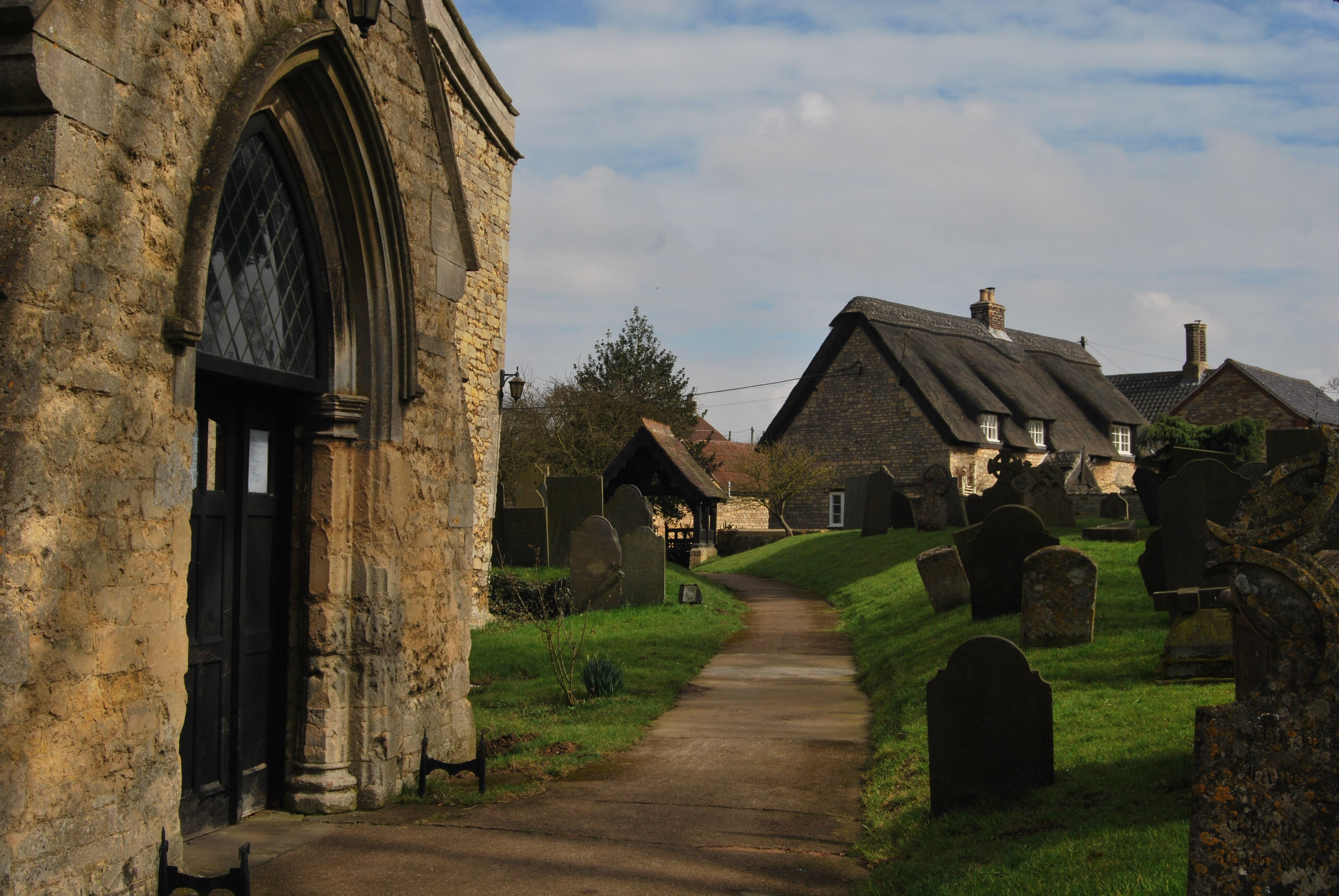
Waltham St Mary Magdalene Churchyard

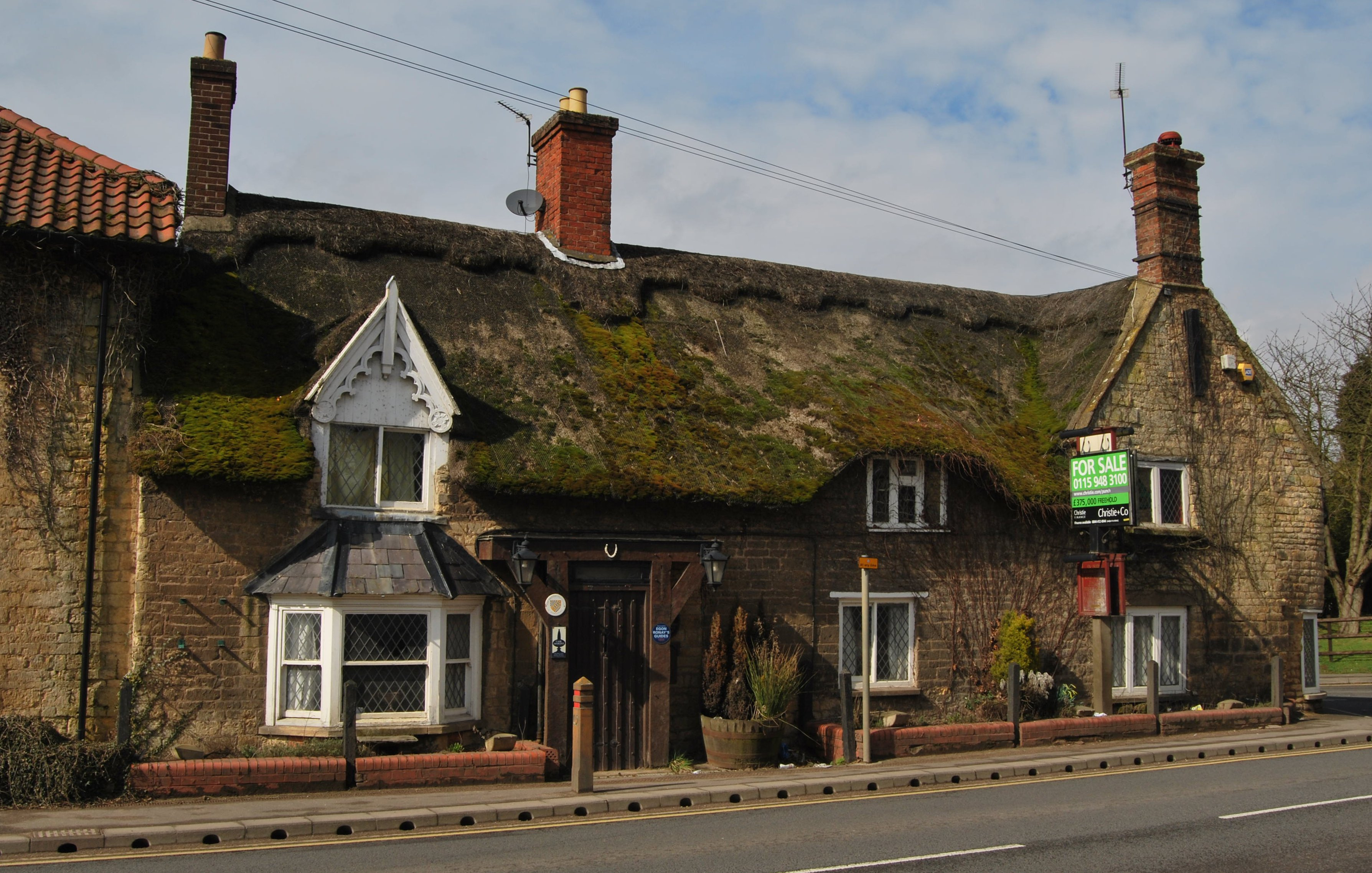
Royal Horseshoes Waltham on the Wolds.

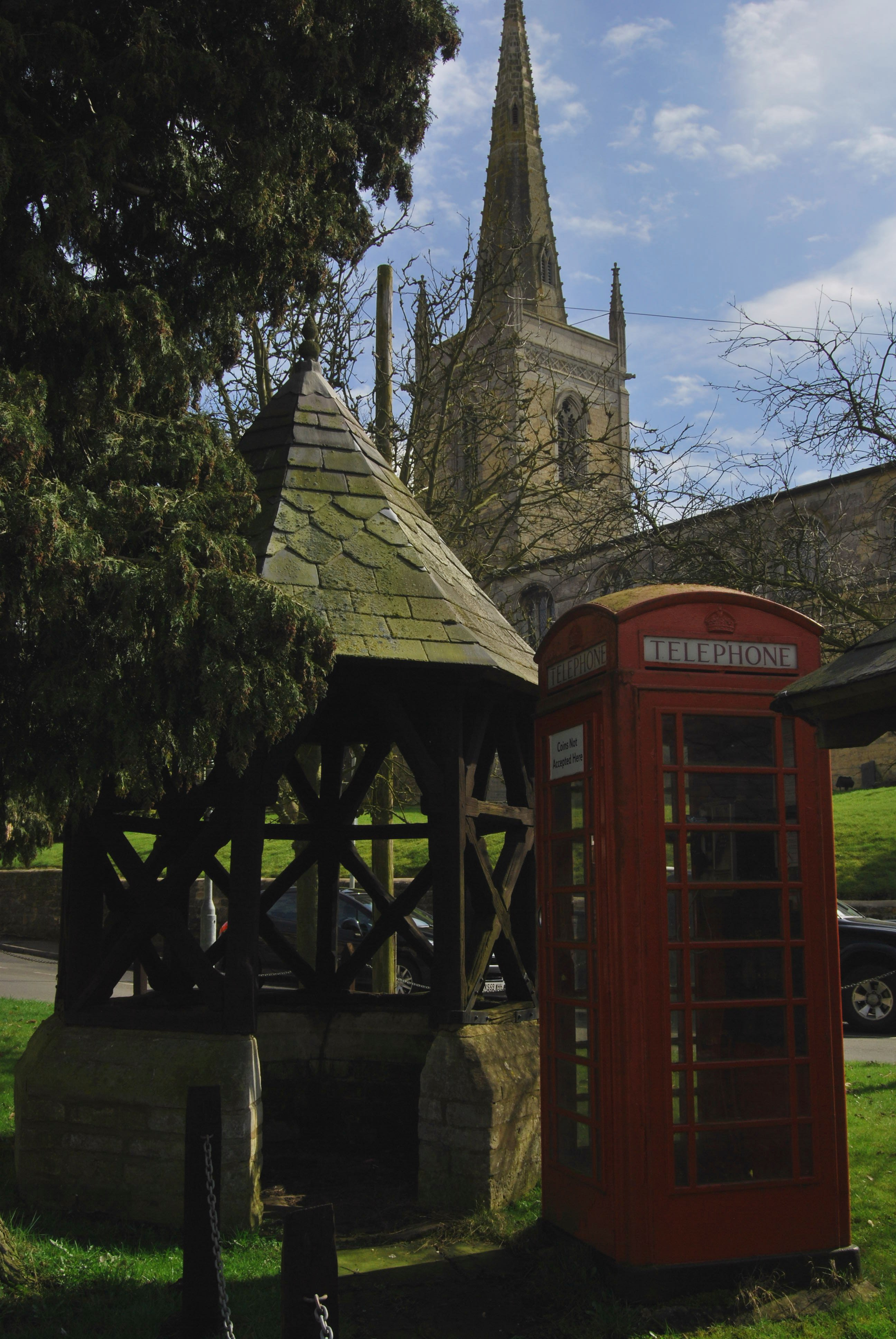
Waltham on the Wolds Well, Church and Telephone Box.

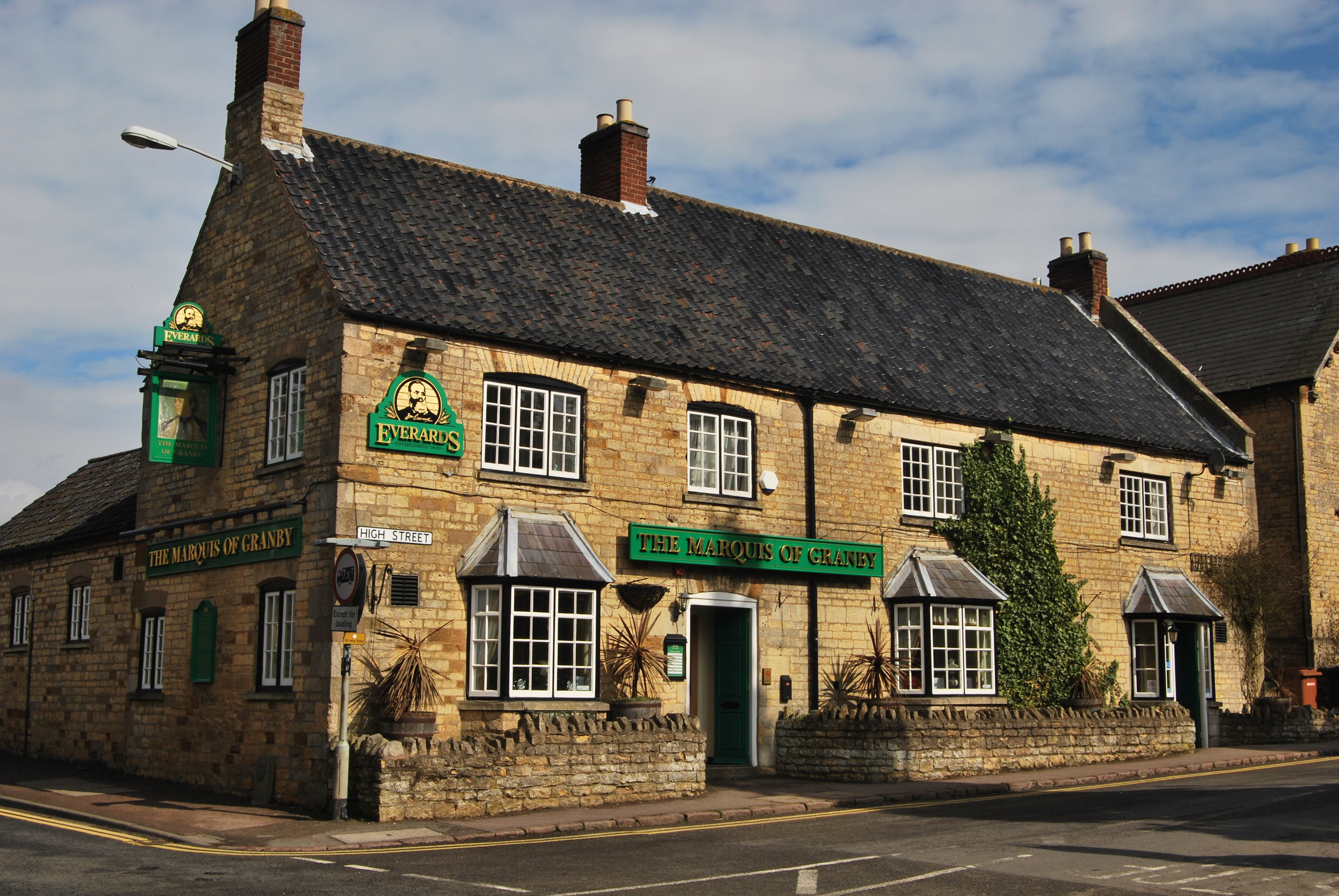
Marquis of Granby, Waltham on the Wolds

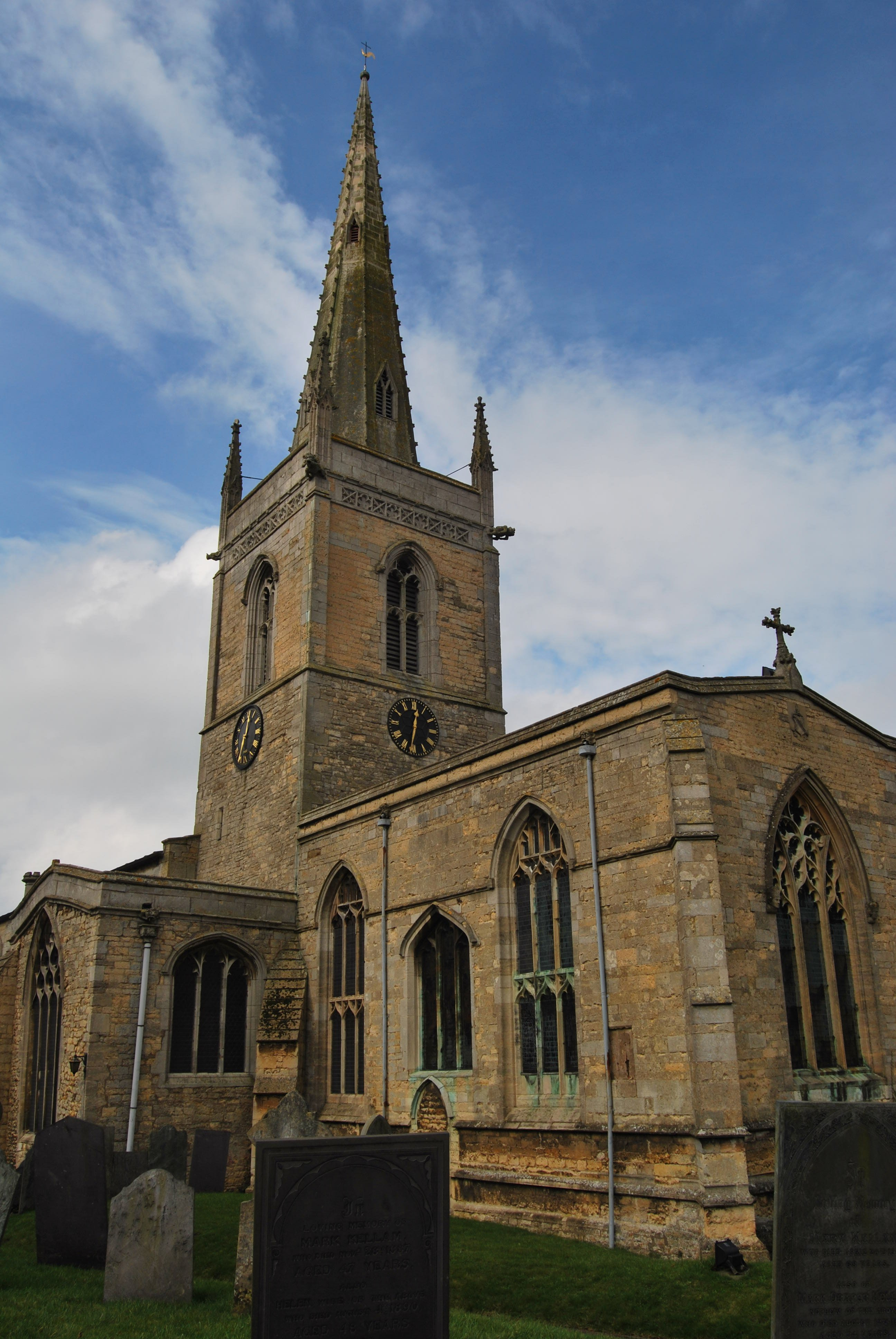
Waltham on the Wolds St Mary Magdalene
