= Long Clawson and Hose railway station =

Former railway station In Leicestershire, England

Coordinates: 52.8323°N 0.8935°W

Long Clawson & Hose

General information
- Location: Long Clawson, Leicestershire; England
- Grid reference: SK746266
- Platforms: 2

Other information
- Status: Disused

History
- Pre-grouping: Great Northern and London and North Western Joint Railway
- Post-grouping: LNER and LMS Joint

Key dates
- 1 September 1879: Opened
- 7 December 1953: Closed to regular services
- 9 September 1962: Closed to summer specials
Location

Long Clawson and Hose railway station was a railway station serving the villages of Long Clawson and Hose, Leicestershire on the Great Northern and London and North Western Joint Railway. It opened in 1879 and closed to regular traffic in 1953.

Former Services

Preceding station	Disused railways	Following station
Scalford	London and North Western Railway; Northampton to Nottingham	Harby and Stathern
Scalford	Great Northern Railway; Leicester Belgrave Road to Grantham	Harby and Stathern
