= Harby and Stathern railway station =

Former railway station In Leicestershire, England

Coordinates: 52°52′07″N 00°52′19″W

Harby & Stathern

General information
- Location: Harby, Melton, Leicestershire; England
- Grid reference: SK760307
- Platforms: 3

Other information
- Status: Disused

History
- Pre-grouping: Great Northern and London and North Western Joint Railway
- Post-grouping: LNER and LMS Joint

Key dates
- 1 September 1879: Opened
- 7 December 1953: Closed to regular services
- 9 September 1962: Closed to summer specials
- 7 December 1964: closed for freight
Location

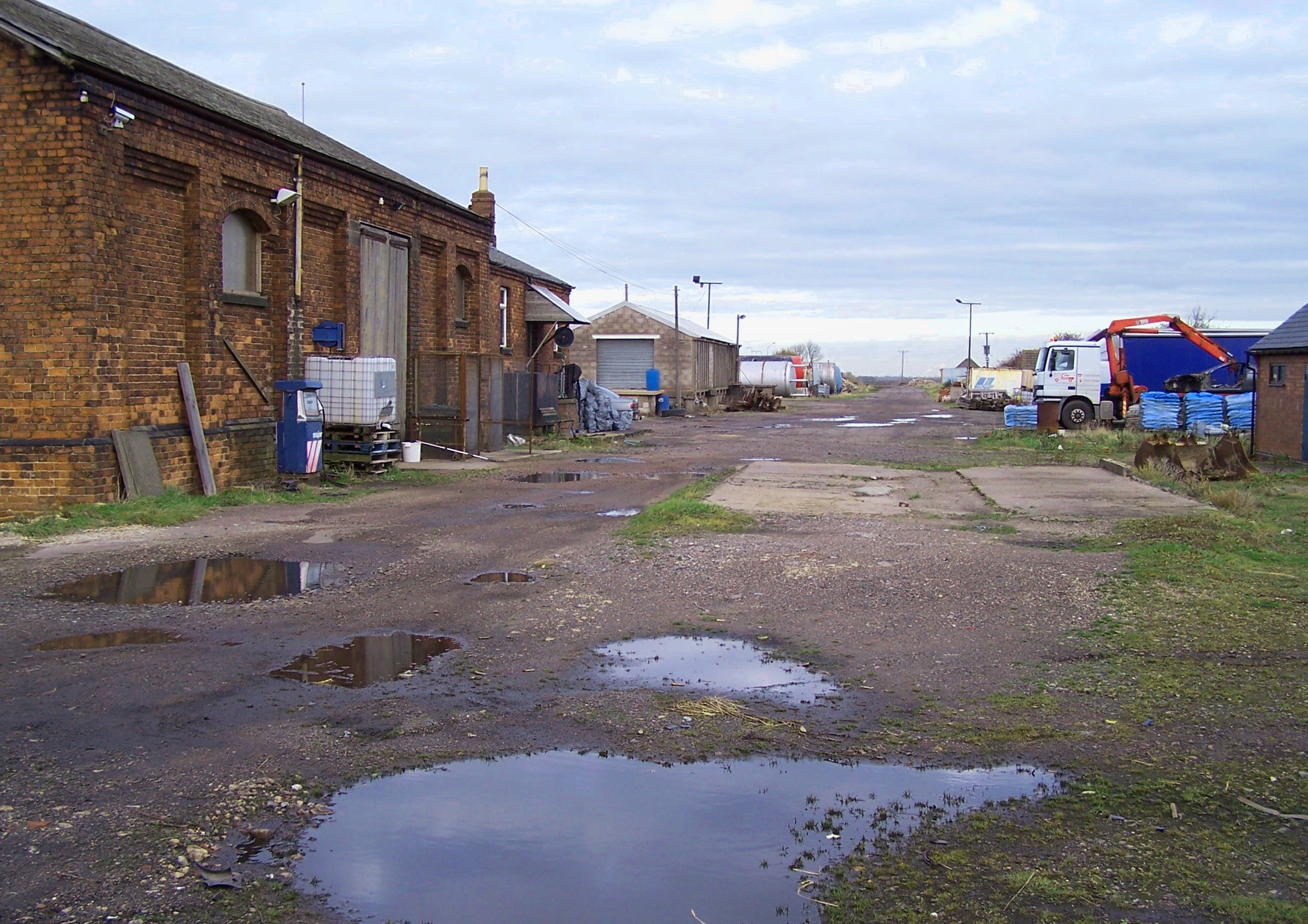
Harby and Stathern Station 2008

Harby & Stathern railway station is a former station on the Great Northern and London and North Western Joint Railway that served the villages of Harby and Stathern, in Leicestershire, England.

== Overview ==
It was the locomotive exchange station for goods traffic, with GNR engines working to the north and LNWR engines working to the south. Harby & Stathern was chosen due to local opposition in Melton Mowbray.

== Services ==
The principal services were GNR services from Leicester Belgrave Road to Grantham and LNWR services from Northampton to Nottingham London Road Low Level. Initially the LNWR also ran trains from Northampton to Newark, but in 1882 these were replaced by trains running between Harby & Stathern and Newark which connected with the Nottingham trains. The connecting trains were down to one in 1910 and were withdrawn altogether by 1922. In addition there were many summer excursion trains.

== Station masters ==
- S.C. Drury
- S.C. Gregory 1915 - ???? (formerly station master at Shirebrook)
- Arthur William Pedley 1925 - 1935
- F.H. Stables ca. 1939 - 1945 (afterwards station master at Bulwell Common)
- G. Watson 1945 - ????

== Closure ==
The station closed to regular traffic in 1953, but summer specials lasted until 1962.

Former Services

Preceding station	Disused railways	Following station
Long Clawson and Hose	London and North Western Railway; Northampton to Nottingham	Barnstone
Long Clawson and Hose	Great Northern Railway; Leicester Belgrave Road to Grantham; Leicester Belgrave Road to Newark	Redmile
