= Eaton Branch Railway =

Overview
- Owner: British Rail
- Locale: Eaton
- Termini: Waltham-on-the-Wolds railway station; Eaton

Service
- Type: Branch line
- Operator(s): Great Northern Railway

Technical
- Line length: 3 miles (4.8 km)
- Number of tracks: Single track throughout
- Track gauge: 4 ft 8 1/2 in (1,435 mm) standard gauge

The Eaton Branch Railway was a standard gauge industrial railway built to serve ironstone quarries around the village of Eaton in Leicestershire. It operated from 1884 until 1965.

== History ==
Iron ore quarrying flourished throughout the East Midlands ore field throughout the 1860s and 1870s. By the early 1880s, a thriving quarrying industry had established itself in northern Leicestershire, working an outcropping of Marlstone that ran north-east from the village of Holwell to the edge of Belvoir Castle. The companies working these ore fields needed better freight transport to take ore to their customers around the United Kingdom. In 1882, the Great Northern Railway (GNR) applied to parliament to build a branch line from their Waltham Branch immediately south of Waltham-on-the-Wolds railway station northwards towards Eaton.

In November 1883, the GNR applied for a second act, extending the Eaton Branch to "...a field belonging to, or reputed to belong to, His Grace the Duke of Rutland... adjoining the road leading from Belvoir to Eastwell, at a point about 220 yards measured in a north-westerly direction from Shelton's Barn.". The branch was under construction in 1883, and opened sometime in 1884.

The branch served a series of quarries along its short route. The Holwell Iron Company was quarrying the ore fields to the south and west of Eaton village, while the Waltham Iron Ore Company worked fields that stretched to the west and north of the branch's northern terminus.

The branch had no passenger stations and carried no passenger traffic throughout its life: it operated purely as an industrial railway.

The branch became part of the London and North Eastern Railway in the railway grouping of 1923. It then became part of British Railways in 1948. It continued in operation until closure and lifting in 1965.

== Route ==
The Eaton Branch Railway began at "Eaton Junction", immediately to the south of Waltham-on-the-Wolds station. It curved leftwards to run north-west on an embankment, gaining height above the surrounding fields. It then crossed Green Lane on an overbridge. North of this bridge, the line curved to the north, still on an embankment. The Eastwell Branch left the line at the start of this curve, just north of Green Lane. It is probable that this was never used apart from a short section near to the junction used as a siding. Certainly by 1903 a narrow gauge line had been built on its formation by the Eastwell Iron Ore Company. The standard gauge siding was used to supply equipment to the quarrying company, whose narrow gauge line was extended to serve quarries at Eaton and Branston. All the ore from those quarries and those at Eastwell was taken via the narrow gauge line including a cable operated incline to sidings at the Great Northern and London and North Western Joint Line near Harby.

North of this siding there was a timber viaduct on the Eaton Branch, which was filled in during 1955 with slag from Holwell Iron Works to form an embankment which can still be seen.

The line then entered a cutting and passed under the Eaton to Stathern road, immediately on the west side of Eaton village. Just past the road bridge, was a loading stage for the tramways of the Holwell Iron Ore Company's tramway. There were pits on both sides of the line as it headed nearly due north. Once more entering a cutting, the railway passed under the Belvoir Road at the junction with Toft's Lane, and terminated in a run-round loop and sidings serving the loading stage of the Waltham Iron Ore Tramway.
