= Eastwell =

Eastwell may refer to:

- Eastwell, Kent, England
- Eastwell, Leicestershire, England
