= Scalford railway station =

Former railway station in Leicestershire, England

Coordinates: 52.8099°N 0.8814°W

Scalford

General information
- Location: Scalford, Leicestershire; England
- Grid reference: SK755242
- Platforms: 2

Other information
- Status: Disused

History
- Pre-grouping: Great Northern and London and North Western Joint Railway
- Post-grouping: LNER and LMS Joint

Key dates
- 1 September 1879: Opened
- 7 December 1953: Closed to regular services
- 9 September 1962: Closed to summer specials
- 4 May 1964: closed for freight
Location

Scalford railway station was a railway station serving the village of Scalford, Leicestershire on the Great Northern and London and North Western Joint Railway. It opened in 1879 and closed to regular traffic in 1953. It was the junction for a branch line to Waltham on the Wolds which was built to exploit ironstone deposits in the area.

Former Services

Preceding station	Disused railways	Following station
Melton Mowbray North	London and North Western Railway; Northampton to Nottingham	Long Clawson and Hose
Melton Mowbray North	Great Northern Railway; Leicester Belgrave Road to Grantham	Long Clawson and Hose
Terminus	Great Northern Railway; Waltham branch line	Waltham on the Wolds
