= Waltham Iron Ore Tramway =

Industrial tramway in Leicestershire

Coordinates: 52.875°N 0.807°W

Overview
- Headquarters: Branston, Leicestershire
- Locale: England
- Dates of operation: 1884–1958
- Successor: Abandoned

Technical
- Track gauge: 1,000 mm (3 ft 3 3/8 in) metre gauge
- Length: 2 miles (3.2 km)

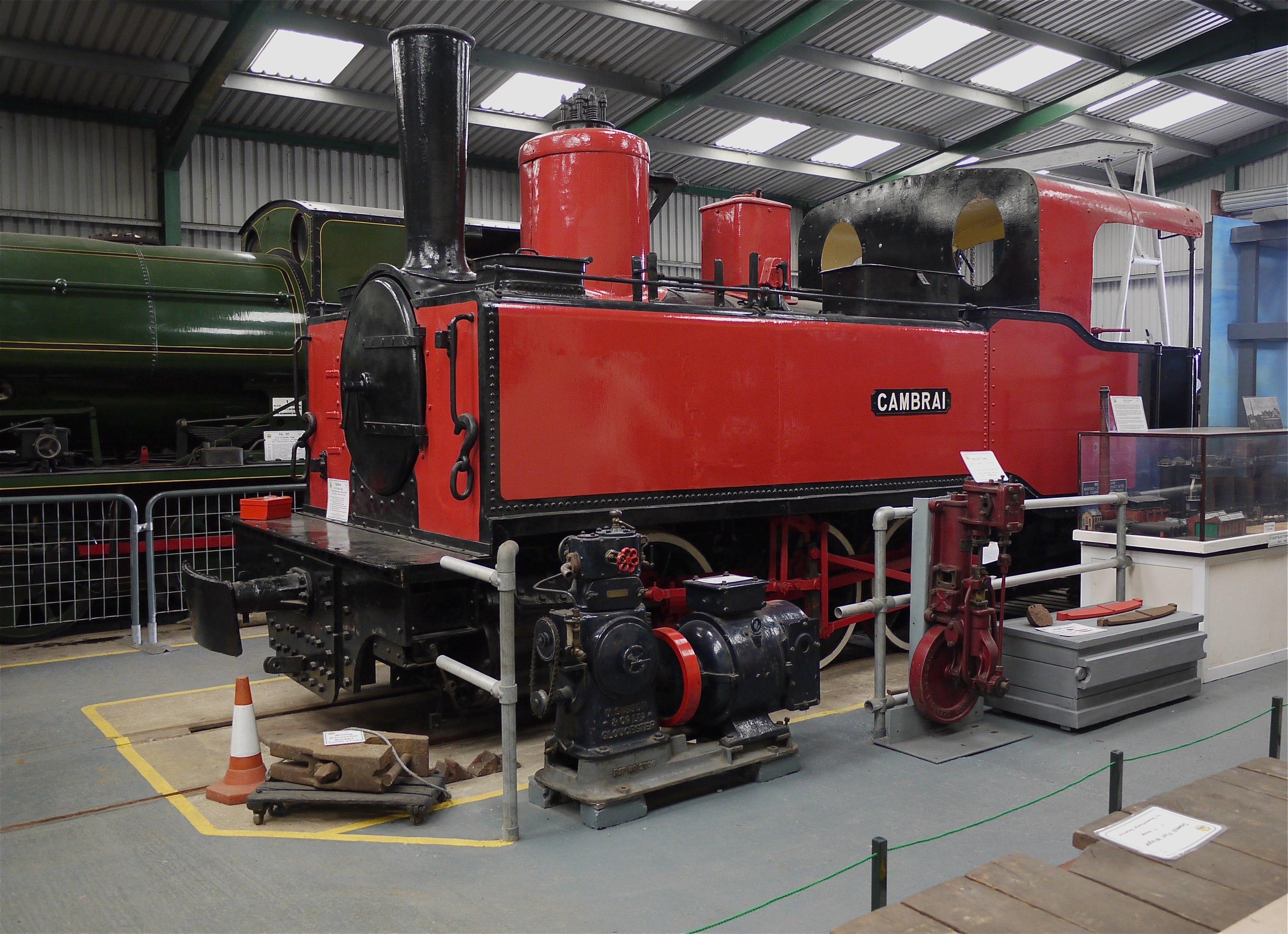
Surviving Waltham locomotive Cambrai

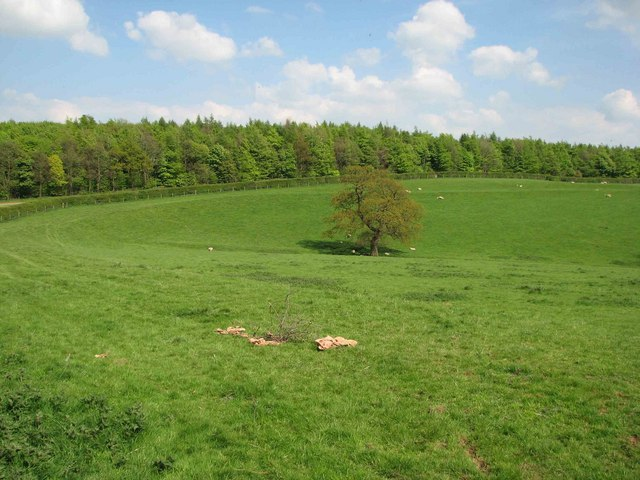
The landscaped remains of High Leys pit on the right, with the trackbed of the tramway just visible following the hedge as it curves towards Granby and Harts pits

The Waltham Iron Ore Tramway was a 1,000 mm (3 ft 3 3/8 in) gauge industrial tramway serving the ironstone pits of the Waltham Iron Ore Company, a subsidiary of the Staveley Coal and Iron Company. It was located to the north of the village of Branston in Leicestershire on the edge of the Belvoir Estate. The tramway operated from 1884 until 1958.

== History ==
The Waltham Iron Ore Company was formed in 1882 to work ironstone from fields near the village of Waltham on the Wolds. It was a subsidiary of the Staveley Coal and Iron Company. The company worked these fields for less than two years, before the deposits were exhausted. They then leased further fields near the village of Branston and began extracting ore there, starting in either 1884 or 1885.

The first pits worked were Green Lane and Long Hole. These were served by a network of metre gauge tramways which were moved as the working faces progressed. They connected to the northern terminus of the Great Northern Railway's Eaton Branch Railway, which tipplers allowed unloading of the narrow gauge ore wagons into standard gauge trucks. In 1913, a new pit was opened to the east of Long Hole, called Bolton's Pit. This was reached by a longer branch of the tramway.

The original Long Hole and Green Lane quarries were exhausted by 1920. The company extended the branch to Bolton's pit to the south east to open up the new Reservoir pit, which was on the western shore of Knipton Reservoir. Reservoir pit continued in use until 1937. The Second World War saw a sharp rise in demand for iron and steel. This was followed by a steady decline in the years after the war, as cheap imported steel entered the British market. In 1949 further new sources of ironstone were needed and land was leased on the edge of the Belvoir Castle estate. A new tramway branch was laid to reach the High Leys pit. In 1951, High Leys was worked out, and the branch was extended to the new Granby pit. This was similarly abandoned in 1955 and the final extension of the branch was made to Harts pit.

Harts was the last ironstone pit worked by the Waltham Iron Ore Tramway. It closed in 1958, and with it the tramway was shut down. The line was lifted in 1959, with just a few sidings by the locomotive sheds at the southern end of the tramway left. The remaining rolling stock survived until 1960, when all but the locomotive Cambrai were cut up on site.

== Locomotives ==
Name	Builder	Works number	Type	Date built	Disposal	Notes
George Bond	Staveley Coal and Iron Company		0-4-0T	1884	Scrapped between 1910 and 1932	Unusual jack-shaft drive from vertical cylinders mounted beside the smokebox
Rutland	Staveley Coal and Iron Company		0-4-0T	1886	Scrapped between 1910 and 1932	Unusual jack-shaft drive from vertical cylinders mounted beside the smokebox
Dreadnought	Manning Wardle	1757	0-4-0ST	1910	Scrapped 1960	Converted to an 0-4-2ST in 1935. Last operating locomotive at Waltham
The Baronet	Oliver and Company	102	0-4-0T	1889	Scrapped 1960	Worked at the Cranford Ironstone Company until 1935, when sold to Waltham
Nantes	Corpet-Louvet	936	0-6-0T	1903	Scrapped 1960	Built for the Chemins de Fer de la Loire Inférieure. Purchased by Waltham in 1934
Cambrai	Corpet-Louvet	493	0-6-0T	1888	Preserved by the Narrow Gauge Railway Museum. In 2017 on loan to Irchester Narrow Gauge Railway Museum	Built for the Chemin de fer du Cambrésis. Purchased by the Loddington ironstone tramway in 1936. Sold to Waltham in 1956
