= Eaton, Leicestershire =

Village in Leicestershire, England

Coordinates: 52.853°N 0.818°W

Eaton
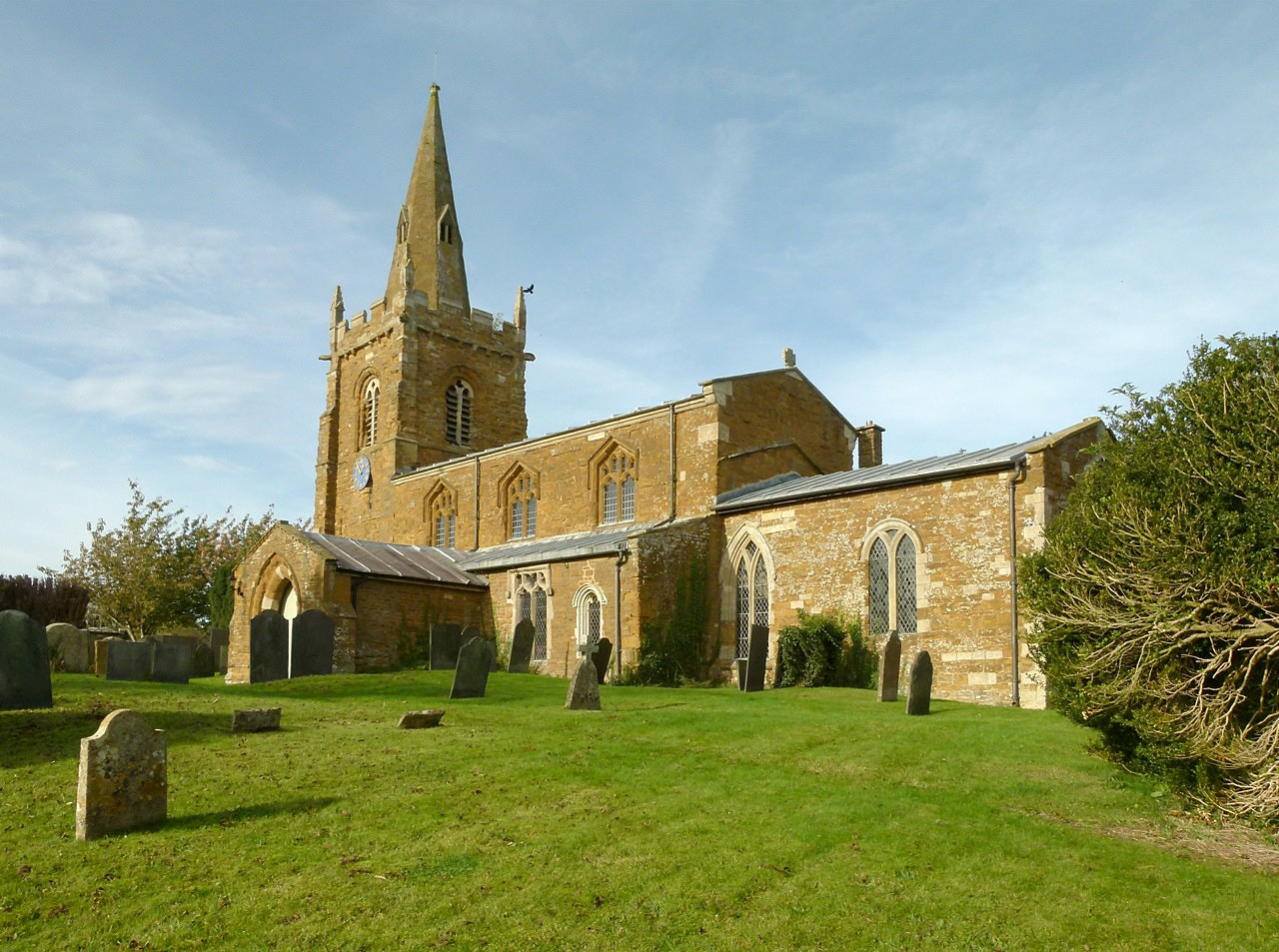
- Saint Denys Church, Eaton

- Location within Leicestershire
- Population: 648 (2011 Census)
- District: Melton
- Shire county: Leicestershire
- Region: East Midlands
- Country: England
- Sovereign state: United Kingdom
- Post town: Grantham
- Postcode district: NG32
- Police: Leicestershire
- Fire: Leicestershire
- Ambulance: East Midlands
- UK Parliament: Melton and Syston

Eaton is a village and civil parish in Leicestershire, England, situated in the Vale of Belvoir. The population at the 2011 census (including Eastwell and Goadby Marwood) was 648. The civil parish includes nearby Eastwell to the west of the village. Eaton has a church, a village hall and a children's park, but the public house called The Castle and its adjacent shop have closed.

== Natural surroundings ==
The land surrounding Eaton has at least ten known springs and is the source of the River Devon. It is full of sandstone. The land is also full of iron ore and the area was a famous source of iron. In the past large quarries were formed outside the village supplying two local iron works by rail via the Eaton Branch Railway from around 1884 to 1965. One quarry has since become a woodland area. The railway bridge under which some of the iron was transported is still standing.

== Buildings ==
The Church of England parish church in Eaton is Saint Denys Church, which mostly dates back to the 13th century. Unusually the spire is built of ironstone. The church is a Grade I listed building.

The public house in Eaton was The Castle, which served food and was a registered campsite. Eaton still has a village hall.

== Local legends ==
The most famous local legend at Eaton concerns a "phantom cat" that stalks the countryside at night. There have been over 300 recorded sightings of the cat, said to be a black panther, in 2001–2002. People believe there must be more than one cat in the area and there have been sightings of dead herons and dead lambs found in trees. There are plenty of hiding places for the cats in large stretches of abandoned railway now covered in trees.

Another local story concerns a 17th-century band of vigilantes in an organisation called Ash Tree Operations, which built a huge underground hideout somewhere in the Eaton countryside. The entrance to this was a hollow ash tree, which led to its name. The band was formed as Eaton had become a popular haunt for criminals from surrounding villages, committing murders and looting houses. It struck violently at criminals in the absence of effective policing.

== History ==
The village's name means "farm/settlement on an island". An alternative suggestion is that it means farm on dry ground in a marsh.

The incumbent's reply to the Articles of Inquiry for the Ecclesiastical Revenues Commission in 1832.

Robert Walker, the vicar, gives the population of Eaton as 350 (from the 1831 census). He was admitted in October 1814. There was no curator so he did the duties himself. There was only one church which was capable of accommodating the entire population. The "Glebe House unfit, being a mere cottage and very damp" was occupied by Richard Palmer who rented part of the land, paying £10.4.0 for the lodgings. The annual income of the benefice was stated as £83.6.2, no tithes or corn rents or dividends and any other income. The surplice and other fees amounted to nine or ten shillings. This was a poor living, as the incumbent states: "I expect a decrease of Income in future but cannot speak as to the amount of that decrease because the lands are said to be too high let at present and poor rates are increasing."

- Source: Articles of Inquiry. Ecclesiastical Revenues Commission: Diocese of Lincoln. Article no. 2348.

== Iron ore ==
Iron ore was quarried in the parish between 1884 and 1965. A mineral branch, known as the Eaton Branch, was built by the Great Northern Railway in 1884 to transport the ore. Its terminus was to the north of the Belvoir Road. Its nearest point to the village was a bridge passing under Stathern Road. The first ore was carried to a railway wharf to the north of that bridge by a narrow-gauge tramway in horse-drawn wagons. The horses on that line were replaced by steam locomotives in 1890. The railway never had a passenger service but occasionally freight other than iron ore was carried. The first ore was dug to the west of this railway to the north of the Stathern Road close to the bridge.

The quarries at the northern end of the Eaton Branch were owned by the Waltham Iron Ore Company, a subsidiary of the Staveley Coal and Iron Company. Ore was transported from these quarries to the Eaton Branch by the narrow-gauge Waltham Iron Ore Tramway, starting in 1884. One of the locomotives that worked on this tramway is preserved at the Irchester Narrow Gauge Railway Museum.

More quarries were opened over the years. The quarries later surrounded the village and except as noted below they were connected with the Great Northern branch railway at various points by standard or narrow gauge tramway. One group of quarries used a tramway that connected to an aerial ropeway which ran to sidings on the railway to the south of the Stathern Road bridge. The ropeway ran from 1914 to 1916 and from 1923 (when it was rebuilt) to 1948. Tipping docks were built at the wharf and also one at the branch terminus on the Belvoir Road. A group of quarries to the south and east of the village connected with a narrow-gauge tramway running via Eastwell to the Great Northern and London and North Western Joint Railway near Harby.

The ore was dug by hand at first but from 1912 onwards steam diggers were introduced. From 1936 onwards these began to be replaced by diesel diggers. The Waltham tramway had steam locomotives from its opening in 1884. One of the tramways had a petrol locomotive from 1929 and a diesel locomotive from 1936. From 1946 onwards the tramways began to close and ore was transported from some quarries to the wharf by lorry. The last quarries to close were south of the Stathern Road and west of the railway and close to the Eastwell Road (east of the road). The last loads of ore were transported from these quarries to the railway wharf by lorry in December 1965. The Eaton Branch then closed and was lifted.

There was a wooden viaduct on the railway which was filled in with slag from Holwell Ironworks in 1955. The embankment thus made is one of the two main monuments to iron ore quarrying in Eaton, the other being the final face of a quarry close to Eaton Grange which ceased production in 1948. This had been one of the quarries which transported ore via a tramway which connected with the ropeway. Most of the quarries have been landscaped and returned to agricultural use.

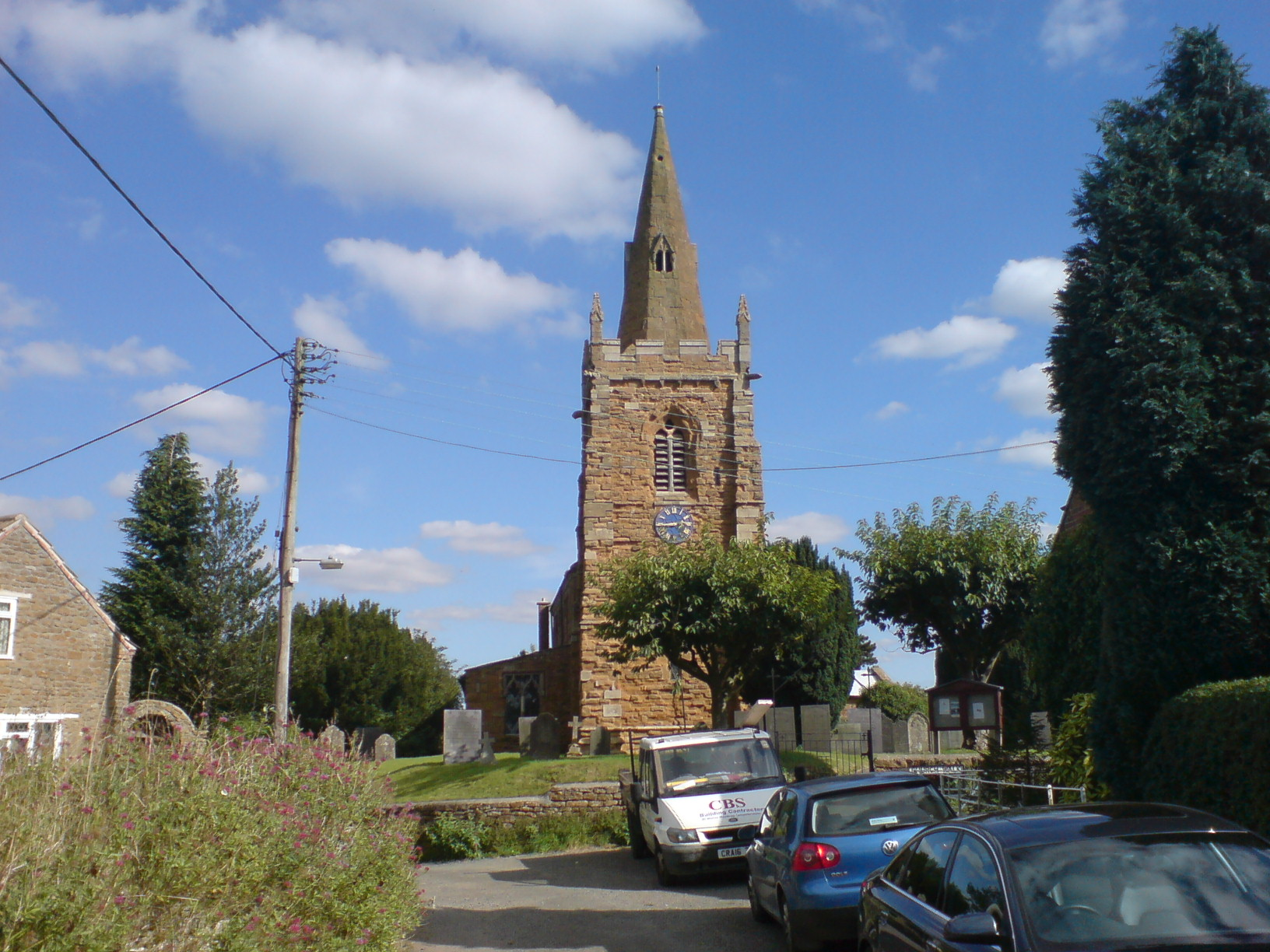
Eaton church

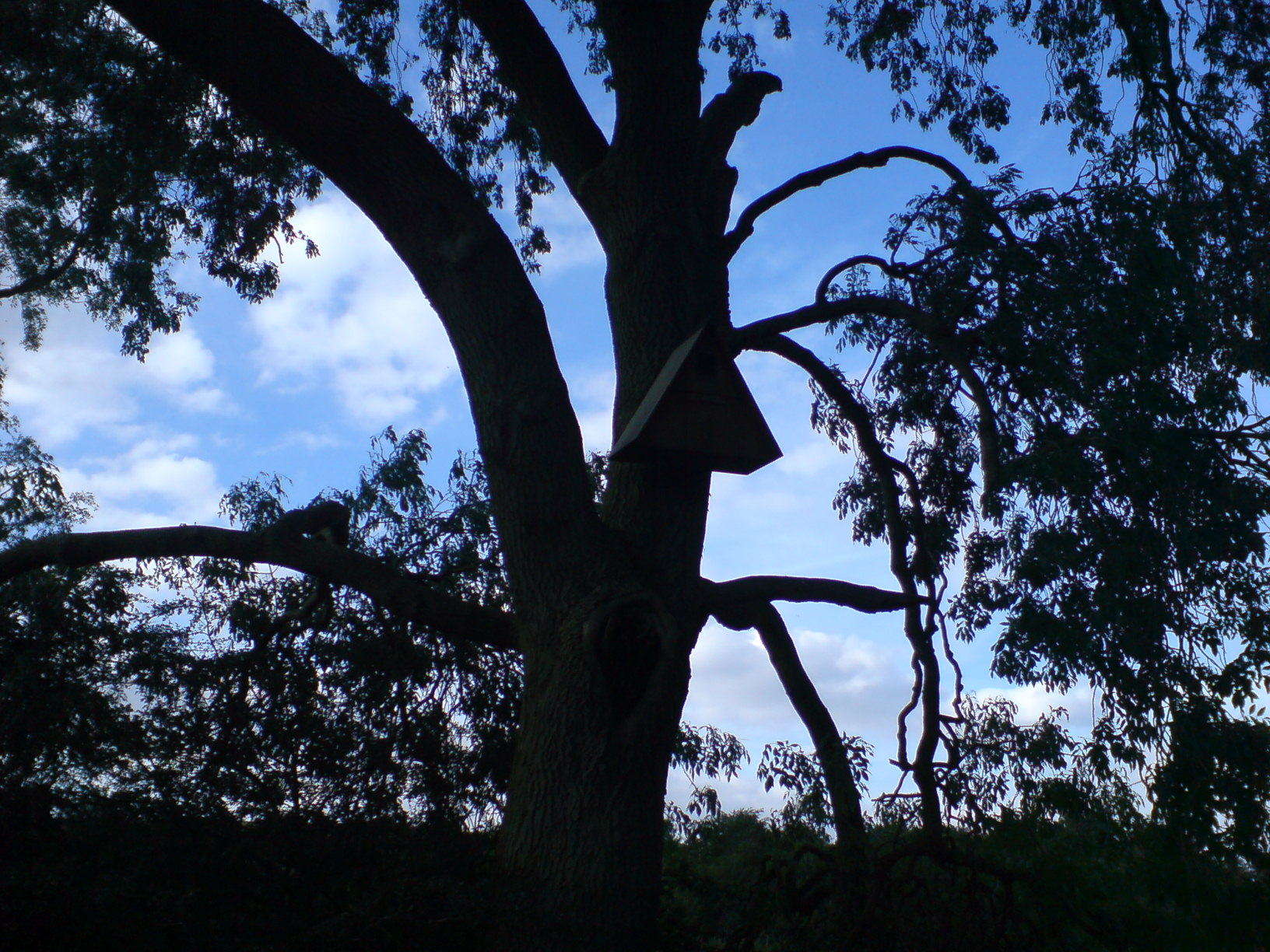
Nature in Eaton; owl boxes

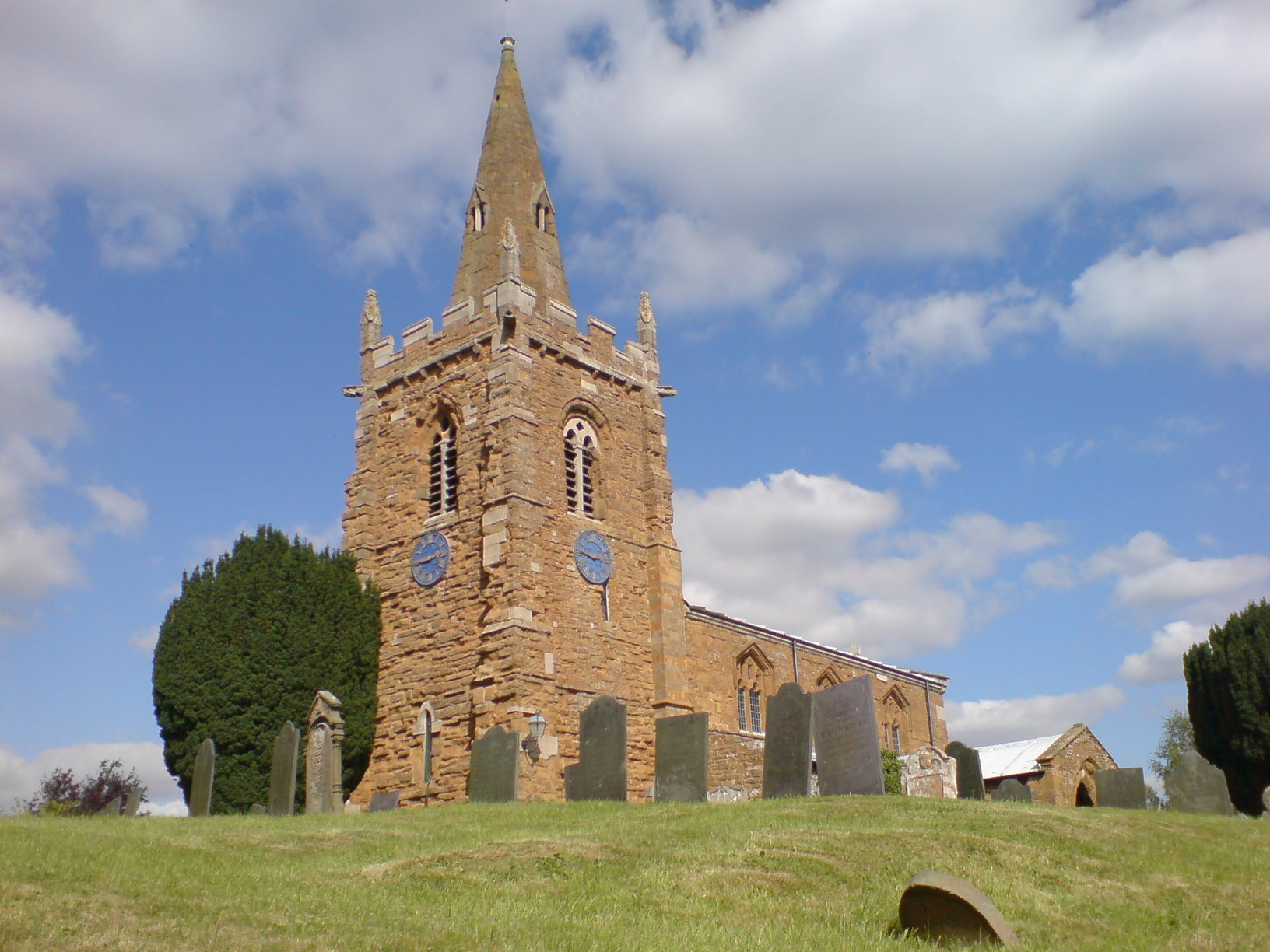
Eaton church again

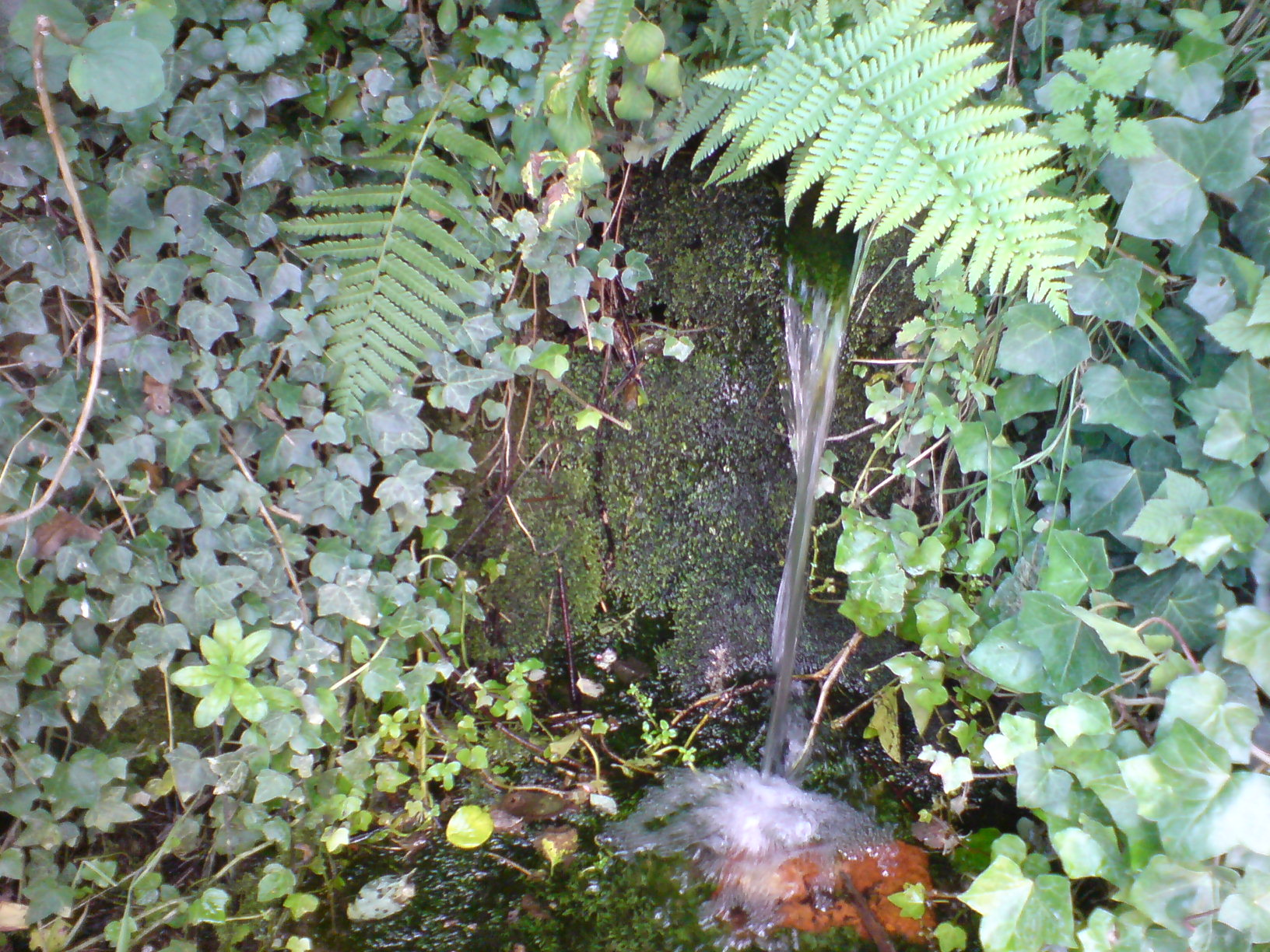
One of the springs around Eaton

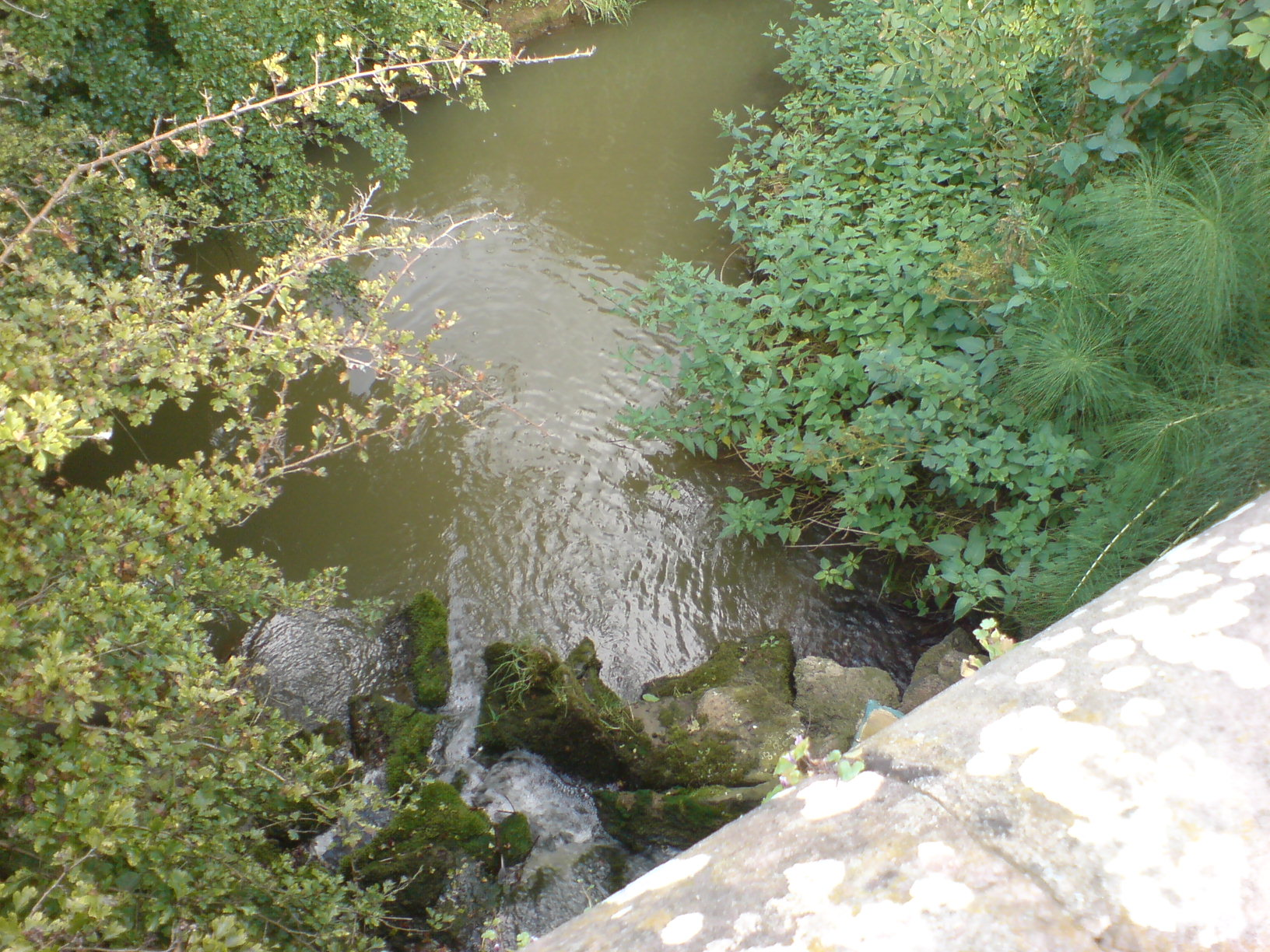
Start of the river Devon

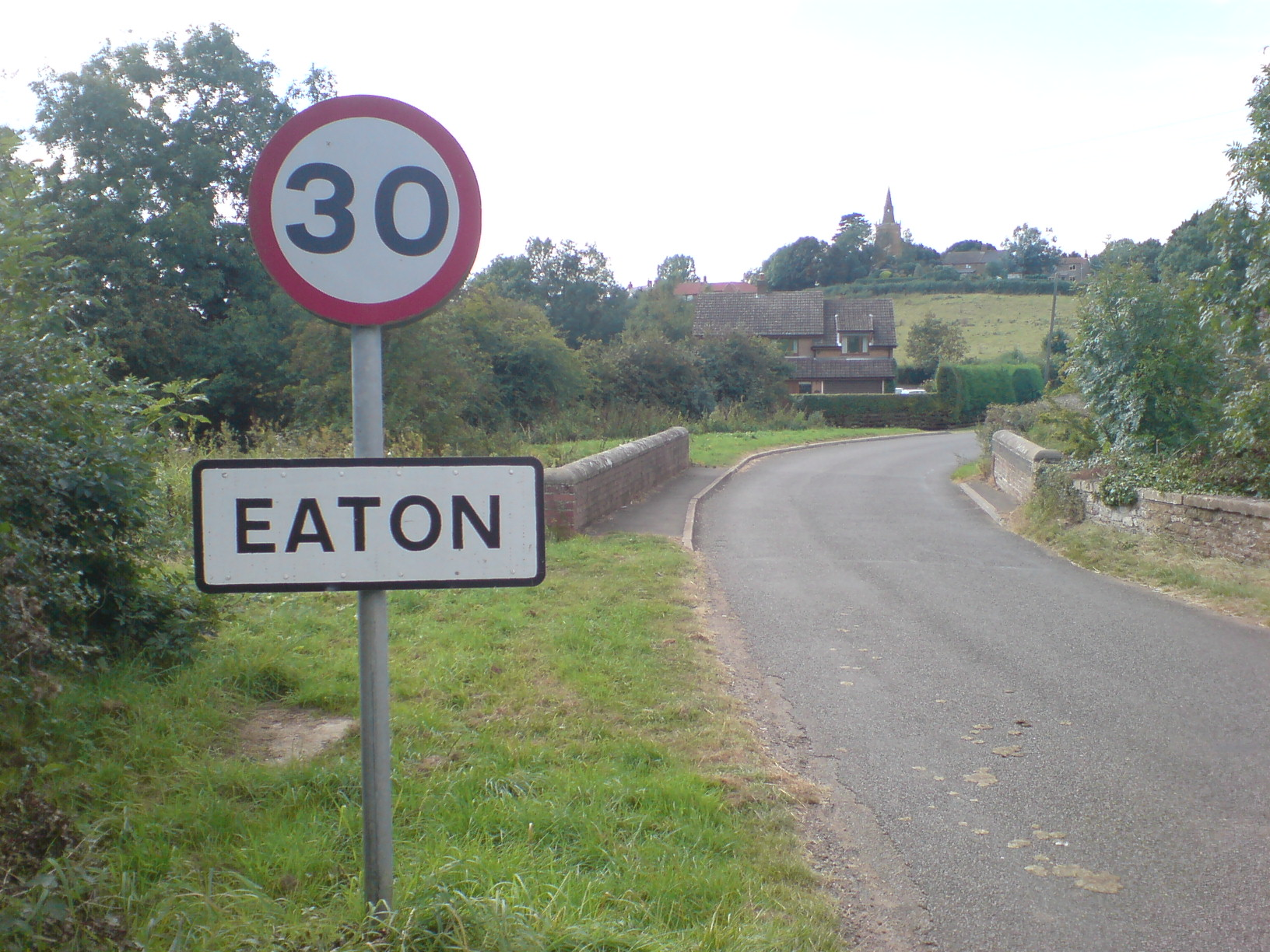
Eaton

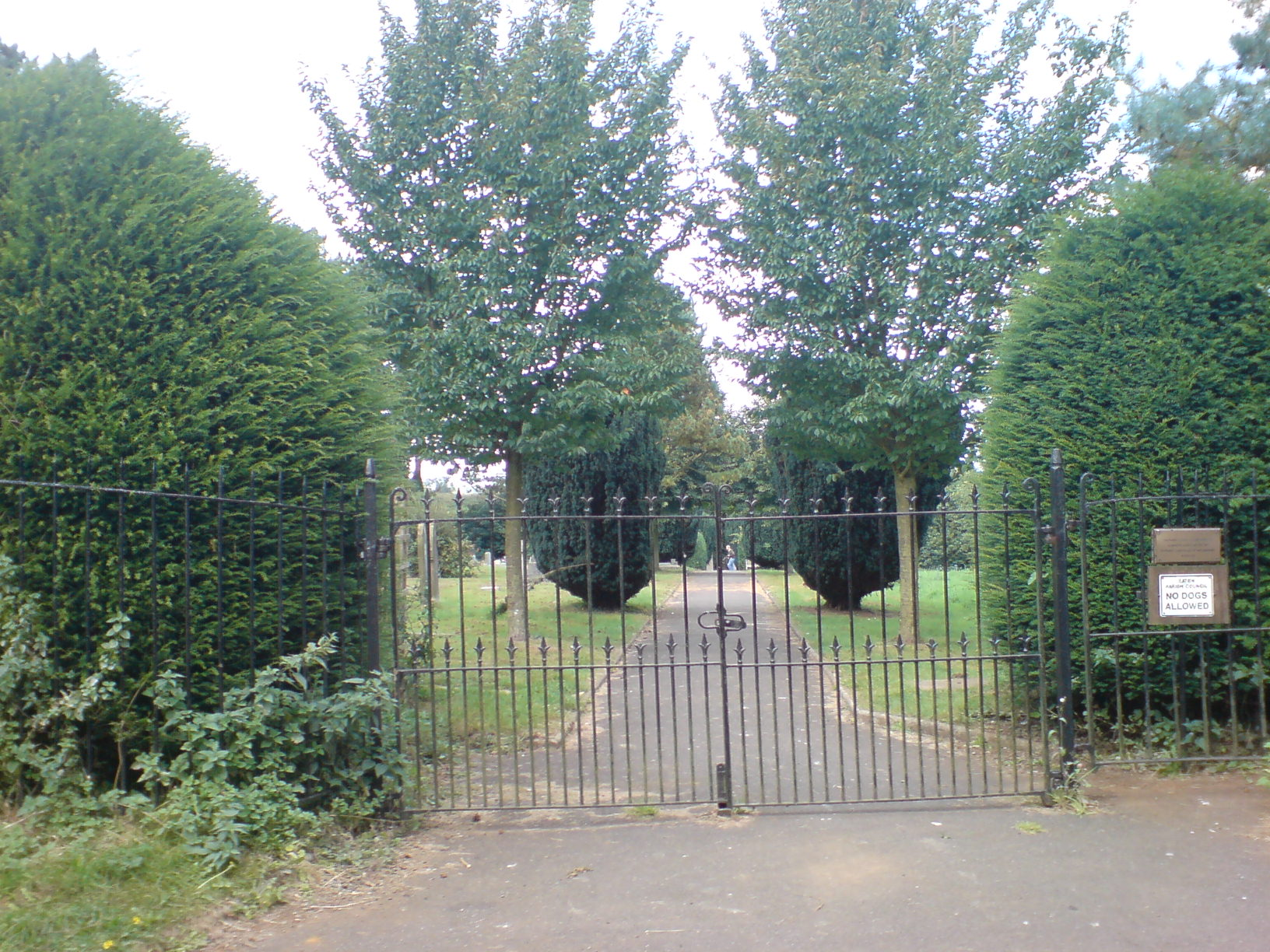
Eaton graveyard

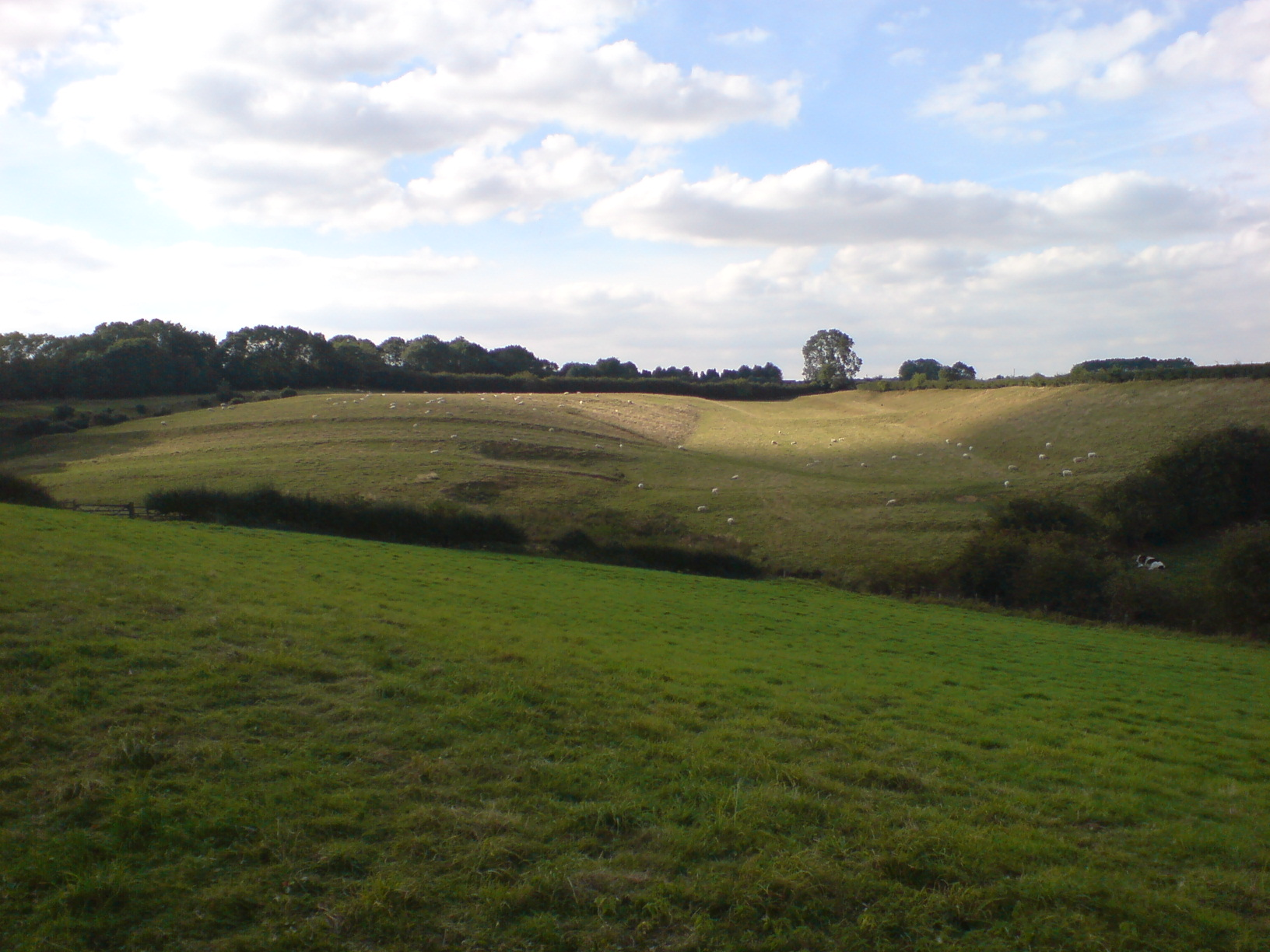
Land where iron ore used to be mined

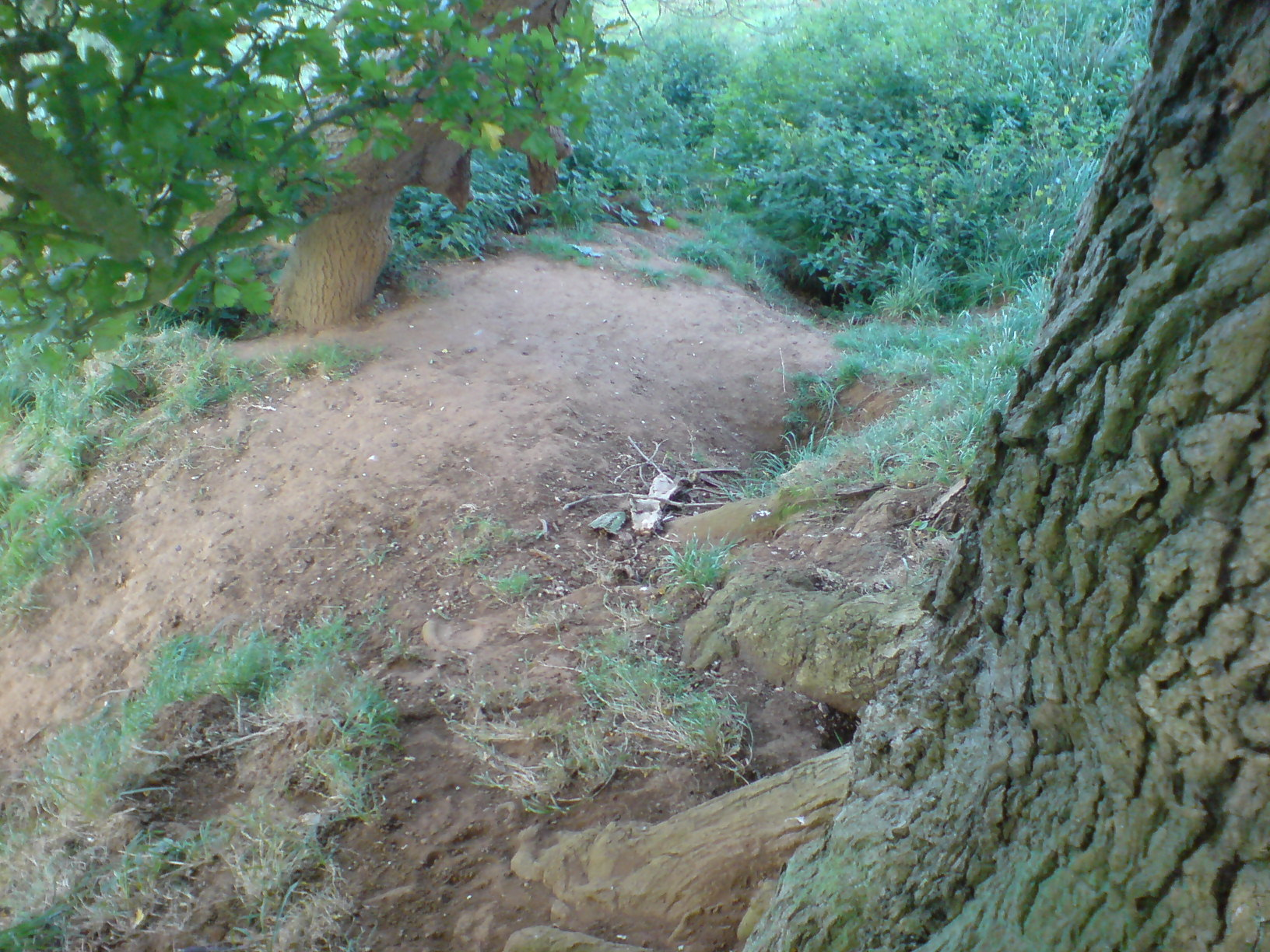
Nature in Eaton; badger sets

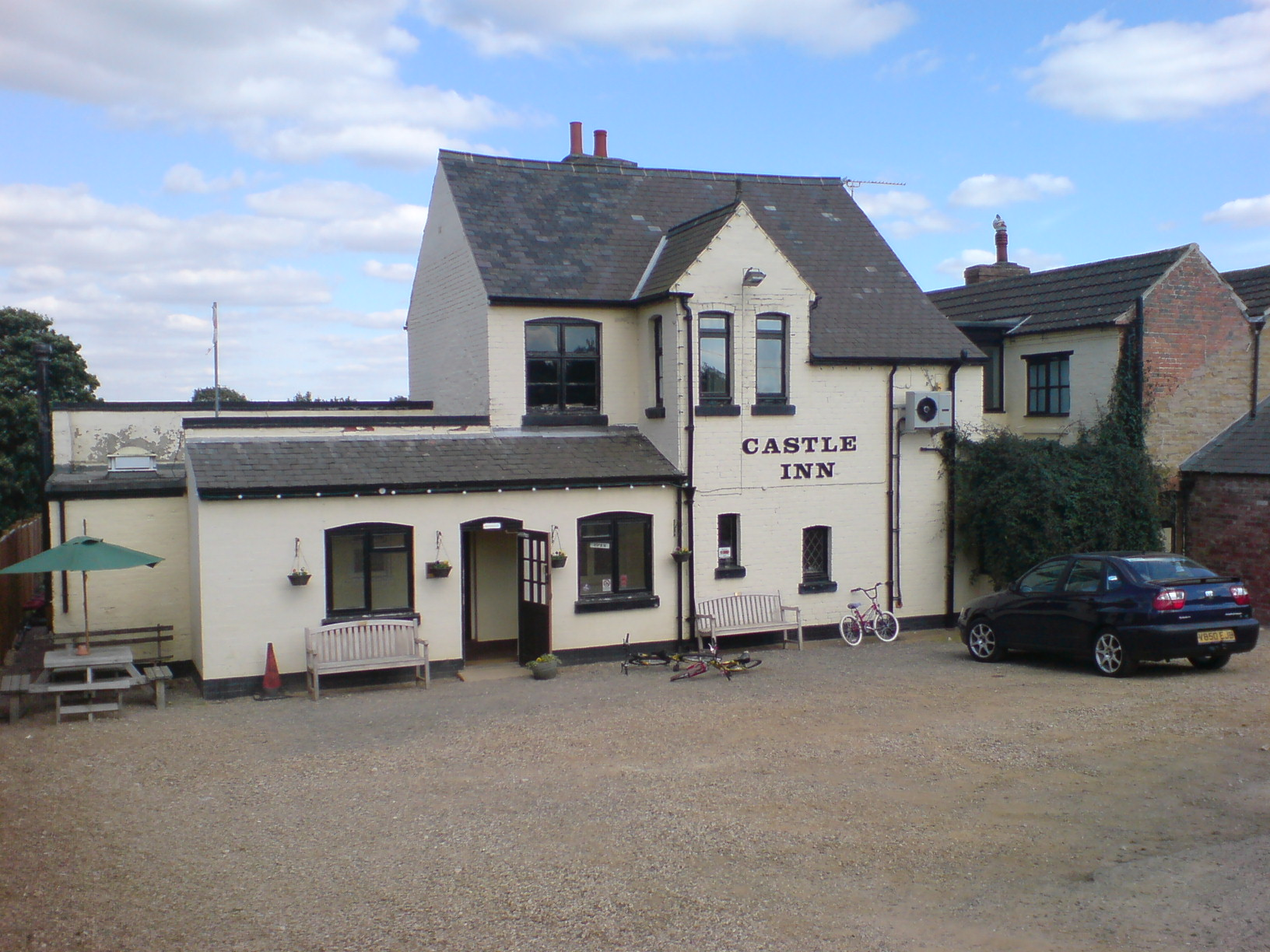
"The Castle"- Eaton pub
