= Eastwell, Leicestershire =

Village in Leicestershire, England

Coordinates: 52°50′50″N 00°51′00″W

Eastwell
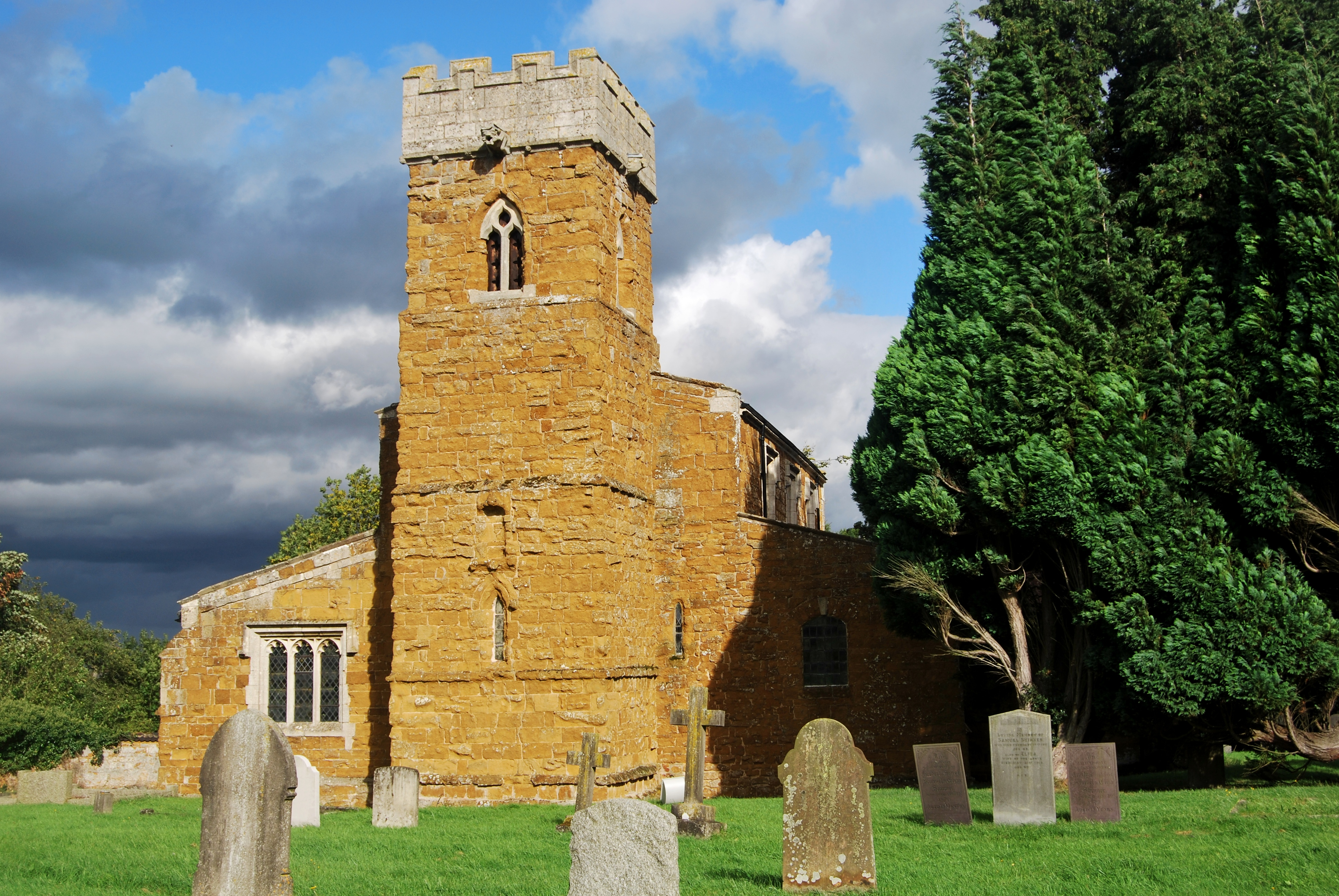
- St Michael and All Angels, Eastwell

- Location within Leicestershire
- Civil parish: Eaton
- District: Melton
- Shire county: Leicestershire
- Region: East Midlands
- Country: England
- Sovereign state: United Kingdom
- Post town: Melton Mowbray
- Postcode district: LE14
- Police: Leicestershire
- Fire: Leicestershire
- Ambulance: East Midlands
- UK Parliament: Melton and Syston

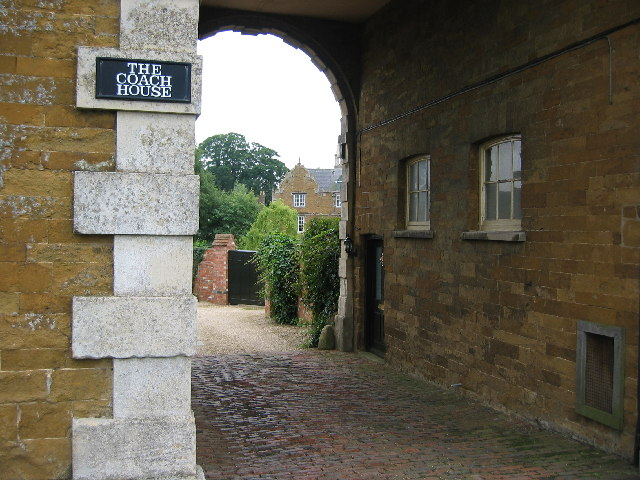
The Hall

Eastwell is a village and ecclesiastical parish in Leicestershire, England.

The village's name means 'eastern spring/stream'.

For the purposes of administration Eastwell is part of the civil parish of Eaton that, in turn, forms part of the borough of Melton. Eastwell lost its own civil parish status on 1 April 1936. Its population in 1931 was recorded as 152; the 1851 census had recorded 158 so the village had not suffered the rural depopulation seen elsewhere. There are 67 occupied dwellings in 2021 within the main village of Eastwell.

Further back in time:

Eastwell is in the Hundred of Framland, 6 miles north by East from Melton; contains 1291 acres, 109 inhabitants and 24 acres. The sole proprietor is the duke of Rutland, who has a seat called Eastwell Hall. Lord Huntingtower is lord of the manor. The king is patron of the rectory, which has a glebe of 36 acres. The rector receives 85 pounds yearly in lieu of tithes.

— Curtis's History of Leicestershire. 1830

Eastwell Church (St Michael) is built of ironstone. It dates mostly from the thirteenth century.

From the early 14th century to the mid 16th century, Eastwell was the seat of one branch of the Brabazon family.

The Hall is a Grade II* listed building It dates from 1634 but has windows and a front door altered in the nineteenth century.

Eastwell Village Hall was re-built and opened in 2015 and hosts a variety of community events including a weekly community pub, exercise classes and live music events.

== Iron ore quarrying ==
Quarrying for iron ore began west of the road to Harby at the top of the scarp face. The quarrying began in 1880. The ore was taken down the scarp face by narrow-gauge tramway on a rope-worked incline to sidings on the Great Northern and London and North Western Joint Railway near Harby where it was tipped into standard gauge wagons for transport to the iron works of the owning companies, the Staveley Coal and Iron Company and the Bestwood Coal and Iron Company. In 1881 the first steam locomotive was delivered to work the tramway between the quarries and the top of the incline. The tramway was lengthened as the quarries got further away from the incline.

By 1899 the tramway and quarries had extended to White Lodge. In 1913, the tramway was extended eastwards to serve new quarries at Eaton and Branston - they continued in use until 1957. By 1959 the active quarry at Eastwell was on the south east side of the Scalford Road, west of the cross roads. The tramway was used only occasionally from then on and was taken up in 1961 and 1962. From 1959 the ore was taken by lorry to the railway sidings near Harby. The last quarry to be worked at Eastwell was on the east side of the Waltham Road, south of the White Lodge; it closed in 1967.

The quarrying was done by hand at first but steam diggers were introduced from 1915 and diesel machines from 1936.

In 1988 some of the quarry buildings remained. The road bridge over the tramway at White Lodge was still there and quarry faces remained in two places east of the Waltham Road. Elsewhere the fields are smoothed over but sunken. Two of the Eastwell Tramway locomotives survive, Lord Granby and Nancy in working order at the Cavan and Leitrim Railway.
