= Staveley Coal and Iron Company =

Staveley Coal and Iron Company Limited
- Industry: Mining, Ironworks, Chemicals
- Founded: 1863
- Defunct: 1960 t/o
- Fate: Acquired
- Successor: Stewarts & Lloyd's; BSC
- Headquarters: Staveley, Derbyshire
- Key people: Charles Paxton Markham
- Products: Pipes, Chemicals

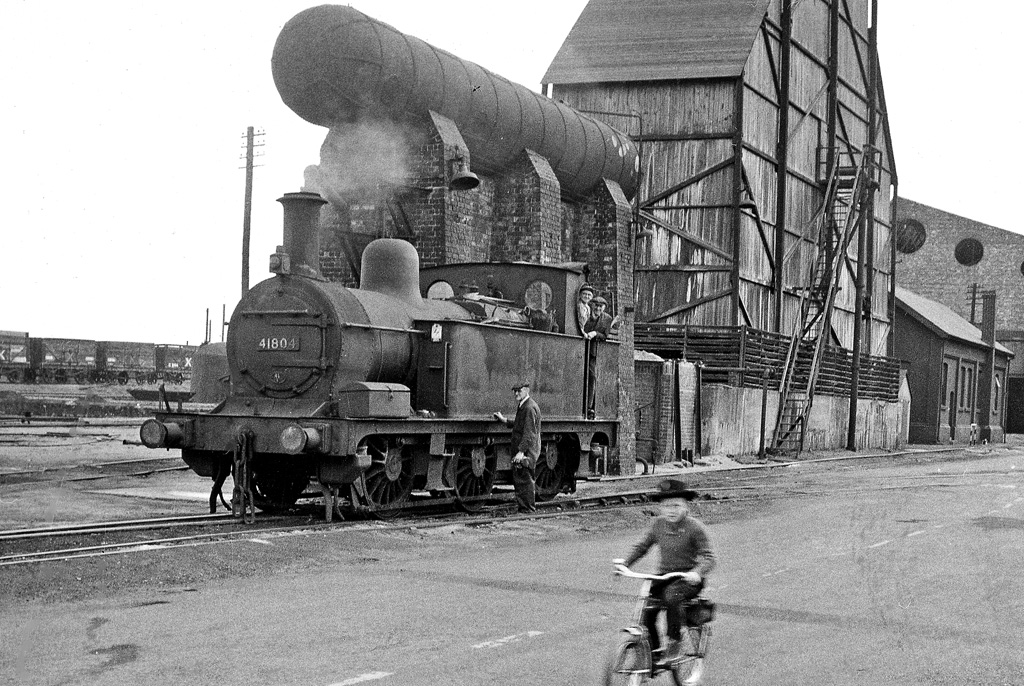
The works was unusual in hiring locomotives for internal shunting work from the Main Line Railways as in 1963

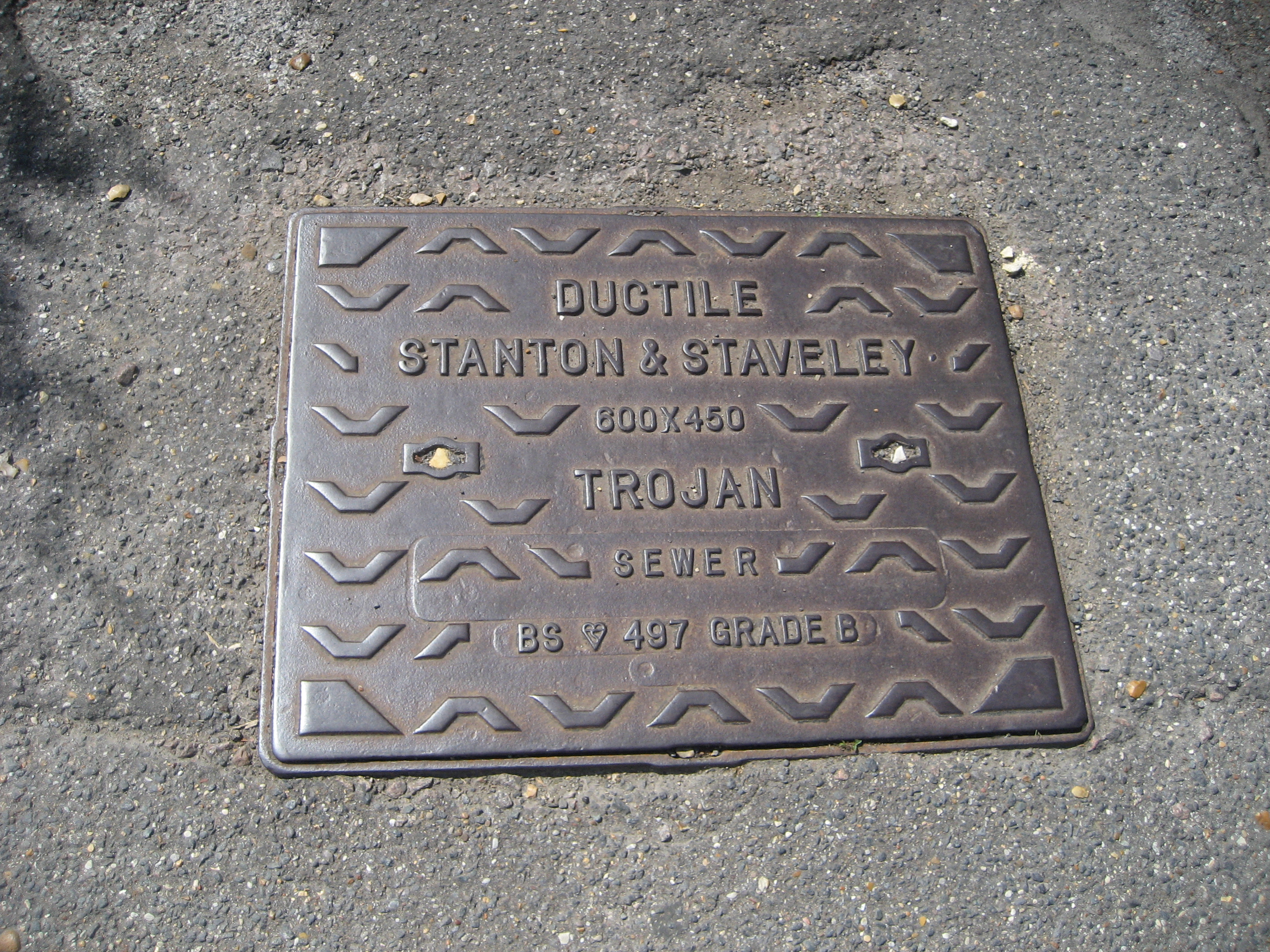
Stanton & Staveley manhole cover

The Staveley Coal and Iron Company Limited was an industrial company based in Staveley, near Chesterfield, north Derbyshire.

== History ==
The company was registered in 1863, appearing in provincial stock exchange reports from 1864. It exploited local ironstone quarried from land owned by the Duke of Devonshire on the outskirts of the village. It developed into coal mining, owning several collieries and also into chemical production, first from those available from coal tar distillation, later to cover a wide and diverse range. Part of the plant at Staveley was a sulphuric acid manufacturing unit making use of the Contact Process.

During the First World War the company began producing sulphuric, nitric and picric acids, TNT and guncotton. After the war the company developed a range of chlorinated organics, purchasing salt-bearing land near Sandbach, Cheshire. The salt was produced by British Soda Company, a new company formed specifically for the purpose. The salt fed mercury cells at the Staveley works. The first cells at Staveley came into operation in 1922 and in 1926 they went into partnership with the Krebs Company of Paris and Berlin to develop a new cell, marketed worldwide as the Krebs-Staveley cell. This installation lasted into the late 1950s when the cellroom at Staveley was replaced with German-made mercury cells.

Another salt-related product was sodium chlorate. Staveley Coal and Iron Company were the first company in Britain to manufacture this chemical, with the plant becoming operational in 1938. In 1950, the Staveley Iron and Chemical Company was named by Imperial Chemical Industries as one of their main competitors in caustic soda production.

In 1960, the Staveley Iron and Chemical Company, which had been taken over by Stewarts & Lloyds Limited was merged with the Ilkeston-based Stanton Iron Works to form Stanton and Staveley Ltd. In 1967, Stewarts and Lloyds became part of the nationalised British Steel Corporation, Stanton and Staveley were also incorporated.

In 1961, Staveley Coal and Iron Co changed its name to Staveley Industries.

By 1980, BSC sold off sections of the site as they divested themselves of non-core activities and by 2007 most of the former works at Staveley has been shut down and cleared. The last plant remaining was a p-aminophenol plant that produced active ingredients for paracetamol production. The site ceased production in June 2012, ending over 100 years of chemical production at Staveley. The site has since been demolished.

Eric Varley, a former Chesterfield Labour MP and cabinet minister, was an apprentice with the company after leaving school before becoming a trade union official and, much later, Chairman of another local firm Coalite.

The location of the former works has due to be redeveloped as a infrastructure depot for phase 2B of the planned HS2 high speed railway due to open in 2033
