= Great Northern and London and North Western Joint Railway =

Joint railway company

The Great Northern and London and North Western Joint Railway was a British railway line, almost entirely within Leicestershire. Authorised by the same act of Parliament, the Great Northern Railway Leicester Branch was built, branching from the Joint Line; on the same basis the Newark to Bottesford Line was built. The lines opened progressively between 1879 and 1883. The dominant traffic was iron ore, and the agricultural produce of the area served also generated considerable business. The passenger usage was never heavy, although some unusual through services were attempted at first.

The passenger service was withdrawn in 1953, although some residual workmen's services and summer holiday trains continued until 1964.

== Proposals ==
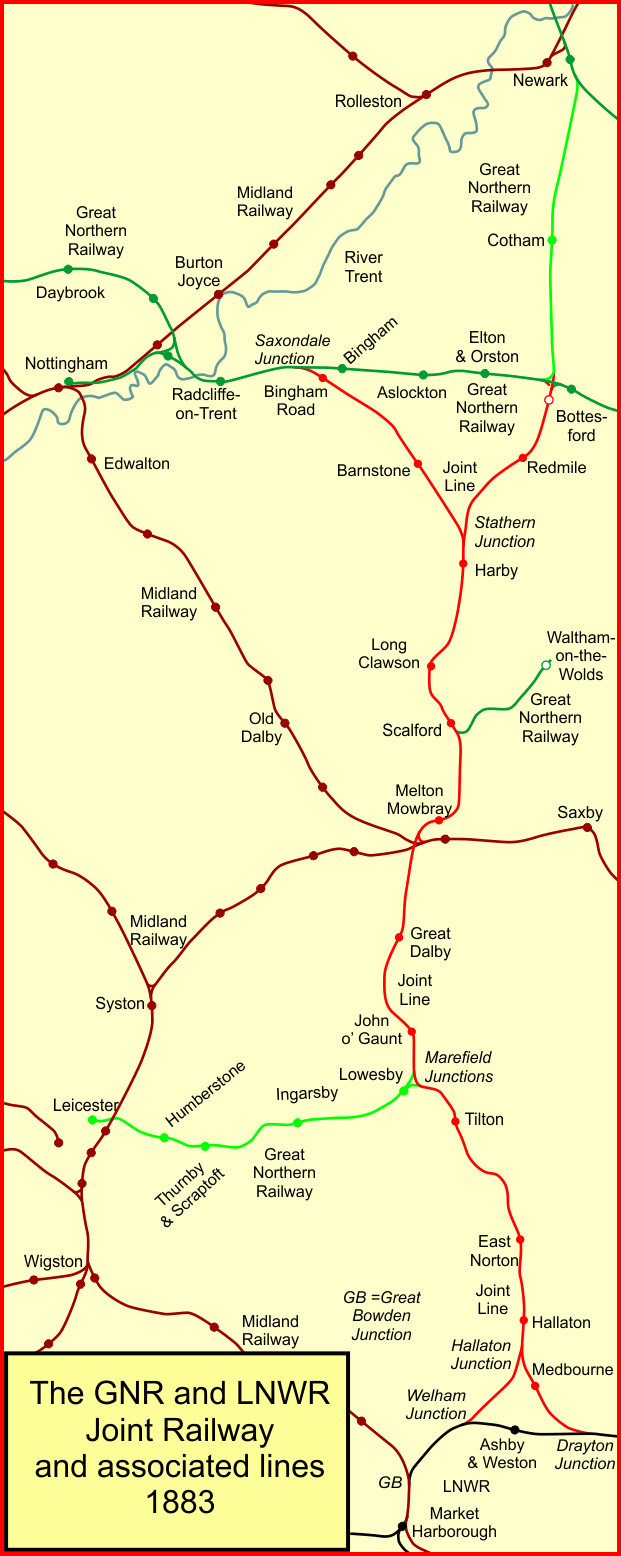
The Joint Line and associated routes

In 1871 private promoters presented a bill to Parliament for a Newark and Leicester Railway. It would run south from Newark on the Great Northern Railway main line, through Bottesford and Melton Mowbray, to near Tilton on the Hill, then turning west to run to Leicester. As well as making a number of railway interconnections, the line would have brought in a number of mineral sites. However the proposal met with considerable opposition from landowners at the southern end, and the bill failed in Parliament.

Great Northern Railway (Newark and Melton) Act 1872
- Act of Parliament
- Parliament of the United Kingdom
- Long title: An Act to authorise the Great Northern Railway Company to construct Railways in Nottinghamshire and Leicestershire.
- Citation: 35 & 36 Vict. c. clxvii

Dates
- Royal assent: 6 August 1872

Text of statute as originally enacted

Undaunted, and noting the mineral traffic waiting to be conveyed, the Great Northern Railway took over the scheme, and presented a similar bill for the following year, 1872. In the same session the Midland Railway had a bill for a line from Nottingham to Saxby; this later became the Nottingham – Melton – Kettering main line. The GNR's bill succeeded in the Commons, but in the Lords great objection was again given to the GNR scheme by landowners, and the Melton and Leicester part was deleted. The bill was approved as the Great Northern Railway (Newark and Melton) Act 1872 (35 & 36 Vict. c. clxvii).

The railways herein-before referred to and authorised by this Act are the following; (namely,)

Railway No. 1—Newark to Bottesford:—

A railway, about nine miles in length, commencing in the parish of Newark in the county of Nottingham by a junction with the main line of the Great Northern Railway near the point where the bridge carrying the turnpike road from Newark to Sleaford passes over that railway, and terminating in the parish of Bottesford in the county of Leicester by a junction with the Nottingham and Grantham branch of the Great Northern Railway near the level crossing of that railway by the road leading from Bottesford to Orston.

Railway No. 2—Bottesford to Melton Mowbray:—

A railway about fourteen miles and seven furlongs in length, commencing by a junction with Railway No. 1 in the said parish of Bottesford, and terminating in the parish of Melton Mowbray in the county of Leicester on the north side of the Cattle Market of Melton Mowbray.

Railway No. 3:—

So much of Railway No. 3 shown on the deposited plans as lies between the commencement thereof in the parish of Melton Mowbray by a junction with Railway No. 2, and the point in or near the field numbered on the deposited plans 185 in the same parish, described on the said plans as "commencement of Railway No. 7." The said portion of railway will be about six furlongs in length.

Railway No. 4—Western branch to Great Northern Railway at Bottesford:—

A railway about four furlongs in length, commencing by a junction with the said Nottingham and Grantham branch at the termination of Railway No. 1, as herein-before described, in the said parish of Bottesford, and terminating by a junction with Railway No. 2 in the same parish.

Railway No. 5—Eastern branch to Great Northern Railway at Bottesford:—

A railway about four furlongs in length, commencing by a junction with the said Nottingham and Grantham branch in the same parish of Bottesford, and terminating by a junction with Railway No. 2 in the same parish.

Railway No. 6—Waltham branch:—

A railway two and a half miles in length, commencing by a junction with Railway No. 2 in the parish of Scalford, or of Rothley (detached), or one of them, in the county of Leicester, and terminating in the parish of Waltham on the Wolds in the county of Leicester on the east side of the road leading from Waltham on the Wolds to Eaton.

Railway No. 7—Branch to the Midland Railway at Melton Mowbray:—

A railway about two furlongs in length, commencing by a junction with Railway No. 3 in the parish of Melton Mowbray in a field adjoining the River Eye or the River Wreake, and terminating by a junction with the Syston and Peterborough branch of the Midland Railway on the west side of the turnpike road leading from Melton Mowbray to Leicester.

The said railways will be in Nottinghamshire and in Leicestershire. — Section 4, Great Northern Railway (Newark and Melton) Act 1872 (35 & 36 Vict. c. clxvii)

Great Northern Railway (Melton to Leicester) Act 1873
- Act of Parliament
- Parliament of the United Kingdom
- Long title: An Act to enable the Great Northern Railway Company to extend their Railway from Melton Mowbray to Leicester; and for other purposes.
- Citation: 36 & 37 Vict. c. ccviii

Dates
- Royal assent: 28 July 1873

Text of statute as originally enacted

The following year (1873) the GNR brought the southern section proposal back to Parliament, this time modified: instead of turning west to Leicester, the proposed line would run south via Marefield to join the London and North Western Railway at Welham. Welham was on the LNWR's Rugby and Stamford line, just north-east of Market Harborough. The London and North Western Railway saw advantage for itself in this line, as it would get access to the ironstone and colliery districts of East Nottinghamshire, so the LNWR agreed to make it jointly with the GNR. The GNR insisted that the Leicester to Marefield section should be its alone, and in exchange the LNWR was granted the inclusion of an additional line, a shorter route from the main part of the joint line towards Nottingham (from Stathern Junction to Saxondale Junction, eliminating the necessity to go via Bottesford). The bill was approved as the Great Northern Railway (Melton to Leicester) Act 1873 (36 & 37 Vict. c. ccviii).

The railways herein-before referred to and authorised by this Act are:

(Railway No. 1.) A railway, seventeen miles two furlongs nine chains in length, commencing by a junction with the railway No. 3, authorised by "The Great Northern Railway (Newark and Melton) Act, 1872," at the authorised termination of the said railway No. 3, in the parish of Melton Mowbray, and terminating in the parish of St. Margaret's, Leicester, on the south-east side of that portion of the Leicester and Melton turnpike road called the Belgrave Road;
(Railway No. 2.) A railway two miles one furlong three chains in length, commencing by a junction with railway No. 1 in a field called Broad Hills in the parish of Tilton-on-the-Hill, and terminating in the same parish on the north side of the highway leading from Tilton-on-the-Hill to Withcote;
(Railway No. 3.) A railway two furlongs six chains fifty links in length, commencing by a junction with railway No. 1 in a field called the Great Close in the parish of Loseby, and terminating by a junction with railway No. 2 in a field called Underwolds, in the parish of Tilton-on-the-Hill;
(Railway No. 4.) A railway two furlongs eight chains thirty links in length, commencing by a junction with railway No. 1 in a field adjoining the Willow Brook in the parish of Belgrave, and terminating by a junction with the Midland Railway at a point about 640 yards north of the bridge carrying that railway over the Leicester and Uppingham turnpike road in the same parish;

The said railways will be wholly in the county of Leicester. — Section 4, Great Northern Railway (Melton to Leicester) Act 1873 (36 & 37 Vict. c. ccviii)

Great Northern and London and North-western Railway Companies (Joint Powers and New Lines) Act 1874
- Act of Parliament
- Parliament of the United Kingdom
- Long title: An Act to authorise the Great Northern and London and North-western Railway Companies to construct Railways between Market Harborough and Nottingham; to vest in the two Companies certain authorised Railways in Nottinghamshire and Leicestershire; to provide for the use by each of the two Companies of portions of their respective Undertakings; and for other purposes.
- Citation: 37 & 38 Vict. c. clvii

Dates
- Royal assent: 30 July 1874

Text of statute as originally enacted

By now the GNR had obtained its Derbyshire and Staffordshire extension, (Note: The Great Northern (Derbyshire and Staffordshire) Act 1872) so that the proposed joint railway had the potential for the LNWR to get access to considerable areas of mineral fields, in addition to reaching Nottingham and Grantham. From the GNR's point of view, the Welham Junction line would have an east-facing leg to the LNWR line, the "Medbourne Loop"; this would considerably shorten the route for coal traffic from the line being transported to the London area. The LNWR reached Peterborough, and the GNR agreed to build a loop there to connect the LNWR into the GNR main line. The proposal was again rejected in Parliament, but the GNR Marefield to Leicester branch, turned down in 1872, was now passed. The LNWR and GNR proposed the remainder of their scheme once again in the 1874 session, this time with the northern portion from Bottesford to Newark retained for the GNR only; this time it passed, with the Great Northern and London and North-western Railway Companies (Joint Powers and New Lines) Act 1874 (37 & 38 Vict. c. clvii) getting royal assent in July 1874.

The railways herein-before referred to and authorised by this Act are—

Railway (No. 1). Tilton to Market Harborough:

A railway 9 miles 7 furlongs 9 chains in length, commencing in the parish of Tilton-on-the-Hill, in the county of Leicester, by a junction with the railway No. 2 authorised by the Act of 1873, and terminating in the parish of Weston, in the county of Northampton, by a junction with the Rugby and Stamford branch of the London and North-western Railway.

Railway (No. 2). Eastern junction with London and Northwestern Railway:

A railway 3 miles 4 furlongs 3·50 chains in length, commencing in the parish of Hallaton, in the county of Leicester, by a junction with the railway No. 1 herein-before described, and terminating in the parish of Bringhurst, in the county of Leicester, by a junction with the said Rugby and Stamford branch of the London and North-western Railway.

Railway (No. 3). Bingham branch:

A railway 7 miles 3 furlongs 6 chains in length, commencing in the township of Saxondale, in the parish of Shelford, in the county of Nottingham, by a junction with the Nottingham and Grantham branch of the Great Northern Railway, and terminating in the parish of Stathern, in the county of Leicester, by a junction with the railway No. 2 authorised by the Act of 1872, in a field in the same parish numbered 14 on the plans deposited with respect to that Act with the clerk of the peace for the county of Leicester. — Section 4, Great Northern and London and North-western Railway Companies (Joint Powers and New Lines) Act 1874 (37 & 38 Vict. c. clvii)

== The act ==
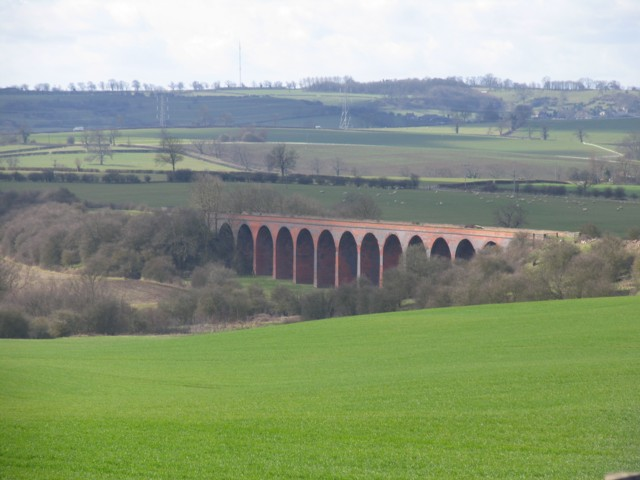
The viaduct at John o' Gaunt

By the Great Northern and London and North-western Railways Joint Powers and New Lines Act 1984 of 30 July 1874, the GNR and the LNWR were authorised to build 45 miles (72 km) of railway between Market Harborough and Nottingham, together with branches to connect the two companies' lines; included in which were portions of the Newark and Melton line, and of the Melton and Leicester line, which were also vested in the two companies with reciprocal running powers. The financial arrangements included the raising, by the Great Northern Company, of £250,000 and by the London and North Western of £500,000. (Note: Carter quotes the capital powers as £333,300 and £666,600 respectively; but that includes the usual 33% additional loan authorisation, not considered to be part of the share capital of the project.)

== Opening ==
The construction was not without civil engineering challenges; the easier Newark to Bottesford section, GNR only, was opened on 1 July 1878. Ballast train workings between Newark and Melton Mowbray via Bottesford began on 23 May 1879, but the section from Saxondale junction to Melton Mowbray was the first to be used for public traffic: the GNR introduced two daily goods trains between Colwick and Melton Mowbray from 30 June 1879, with provision for trip working when required from Stathern junction northwards along the Bottesford line to serve Redmile. Passenger traffic over these parts of the joint system began on 1 September with the introduction of connecting Nottingham to Melton and Newark to Harby & Stathern services, worked by the GNR. Progress south of Melton was delayed by slips in embankments, but on 13 October 1879 the route was opened for freight traffic as far as Burrow & Twyford (renamed John o' Gaunt in 1883). Through goods trains to and from Market Harborough via Welham junction commenced on 1 November and on 1 December the LNWR began working goods services to Doncaster. Passenger trains between Nottingham and Northampton were introduced on 15 December, but regular use of the east fork from Hallaton to Drayton did not begin until 2 July 1883, when the GNR inaugurated a Leicester - Peterborough service.

At Bottesford, the northern end of the joint line, a south-to-west curve was included in the layout, but this quickly fell into disuse since the branch to Saxondale junction provided a more direct route for Nottingham traffic. However, the GNR added a south-to-east chord, which it opened on 1 September 1879 for a new passenger service between Grantham and Harby & Stathern. Another short spur was provided at Melton Mowbray, in this case as part of the joint mileage. The spur, known as Sysonby curve, connected with the Midland Railway, and was probably built in 1879. However, it appears to have seen little use and was severed on 31 October 1882; it was then brought back into service on 16 April 1883 for Midland ironstone traffic but closed completely on 18 April 1887.

The GNR Marefield to Leicester line was opened on 15 May 1882. The accommodation at Leicester was temporary until the Belgrave Road station was opened for passenger traffic on 1 January 1883. A connection was made at Leicester with the Midland Railway main line; it opened on 7 August 1883, and later closed on 8 January 1908. (Note: Gough uses the word "approved" for the opening, suggesting that it may have been physically completed earlier; and he uses the word "abandoned" for the closure, implying that it may have been disused for some previous period.)

== Train services ==
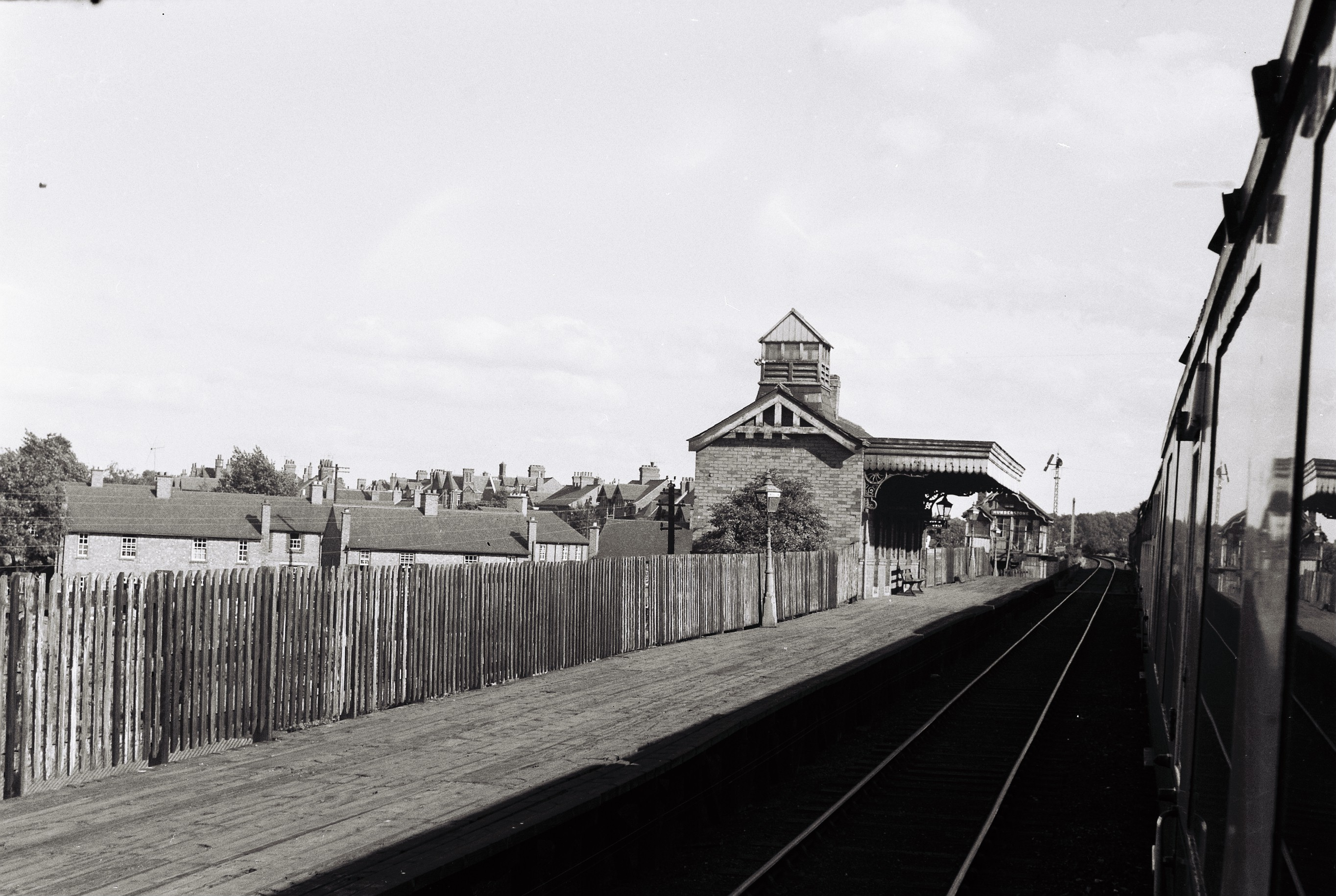
Humberstone railway station

The Great Northern Railway had admitted the LNWR to the joint scheme to minimise its own exposure; in fact it had let the LNWR into the area the GNR had hoped to control, and the LNWR gained much from the fact. The passenger business was not commercially significant; freight, particularly originating and through mineral traffic, was the dominant element.

Leleux says:

The line was an important goods route, while also contributing much local traffic. The LNWR was able to tap the East Midlands coalfield, and ran seven daily coal trains to Willesden, with seven other freight trains to the South Midlands. There were regular mixed freights from Camden to Doncaster, including a wool train going on to Bradford. Stone trains ran from Northamptonshire to Scunthorpe. Until 1939, a hundred trains a day used the line, but these were reduced after nationalisation, until by 1960 they were being rationalised on to other routes. Local traffic was mainly agricultural: milk traffic was centred on John o' Gaunt, which sent up to four tanks daily to London... Cattle traffic was such that a passenger train might pick up sixteen cattle trucks en route... Ironstone, though, was most important...

Before World War I there were about a dozen passenger trains between John o' Gaunt and Stathern; half of them worked between Grantham and Leicester and half between Northampton and Nottingham. One of the latter was an express; in addition three trains a day ran between Leicester Belgrave Road and Peterborough, via the Lowesby, Medbourne and Longville curves, but this service was discontinued in 1916.

The LNWR's main contribution to the passenger train mileage over the joint line was a Northampton - Nottingham service, which included one through working from and to London Euston. It also provided some peak summer workings to east coast destinations via Newark, supplementing the regular GNR services to Newark, Grantham, and Peterborough. Some bizarre services were provided at first, such as that by the LNWR from Leamington to Scarborough in July 1883, but these were short-lived too, and with the opening of the Leicester branch a pattern of workings which was to become standard began to emerge. Colwick LNWR depot provided most of the motive power required for the LNWR services.

The GNR based its passenger operations on Leicester Belgrave Road station, where for some years there were daily departures for Grantham, Newark and Peterborough. The last of these three services was short lived however. It had commenced on 2 July 1883 with four trains in each direction, over the 50-mile route via Tilton, Medbourne, Seaton and Wansford; it somehow managed to avoid all settlements other than small villages and in 1916 the two surviving Peterborough trains were withdrawn as a wartime economy measure. This brought about the closure of Medbourne station, which was later burnt down, and also deprived the equally obscure GNR service to Stamford of its "main-line" connections at Wansford. Neither of these considerations mattered a great deal though, for this particular attempt to compete with the Midland Railway had failed.

Of the other two services from Belgrave Road, that to Grantham was the most successful. In 1904 there were five trains out of Leicester and six return workings daily as well as a modest commuter service of one train a day to and from Lowesby. The small three-road engine shed at Leicester, which survived until 11 June 1955, provided locomotives for both freight and passenger workings. In pre-grouping years these were just as interesting as those used on the Joint Line by the LNWR; Stirling and Ivatt single-wheelers, Ivatt Atlantics and assorted 2-4-0s, 0-4-2s and 4-4-0s have all worked on the line.

As far as passenger traffic was concerned, neither the joint line nor the Leicester branch paid their way. Most customers travelled between towns which were linked by alternative services of greater frequency or convenience, and even receipts at Leicester Belgrave Road and Melton Mowbray North were pathetically meagre. Towards the end it was not uncommon for local trains to complete their journeys without having carried a single passenger.

There was a spur between the Joint Line and the Midland Railway at Melton Mowbray, but it was removed in 1901. The Longville curve was severed in 1929, but reinstated in 1947 as a route from brickworks traffic.

It was most appropriate that both the first and last public passenger trains from Belgrave Road were bound for the Lincolnshire coast. On 2 October 1882 an excursion left Leicester for Skegness and for the next eighty years the terminus was known to many thousands of Leicester holidaymakers as the station for the sea. Though insignificant when compared with the amount of traffic to Skegness, Mablethorpe and Sutton on Sea, other special workings over the east Leicestershire lines were not without interest. Waltham Fair and Croxton Park race meetings saw passenger coaches being drawn over the Waltham mineral line, agricultural specials ran to East Anglia, and trains even ran to the annual Hallaton bottle-kicking contest.

== Leicester GNR station ==
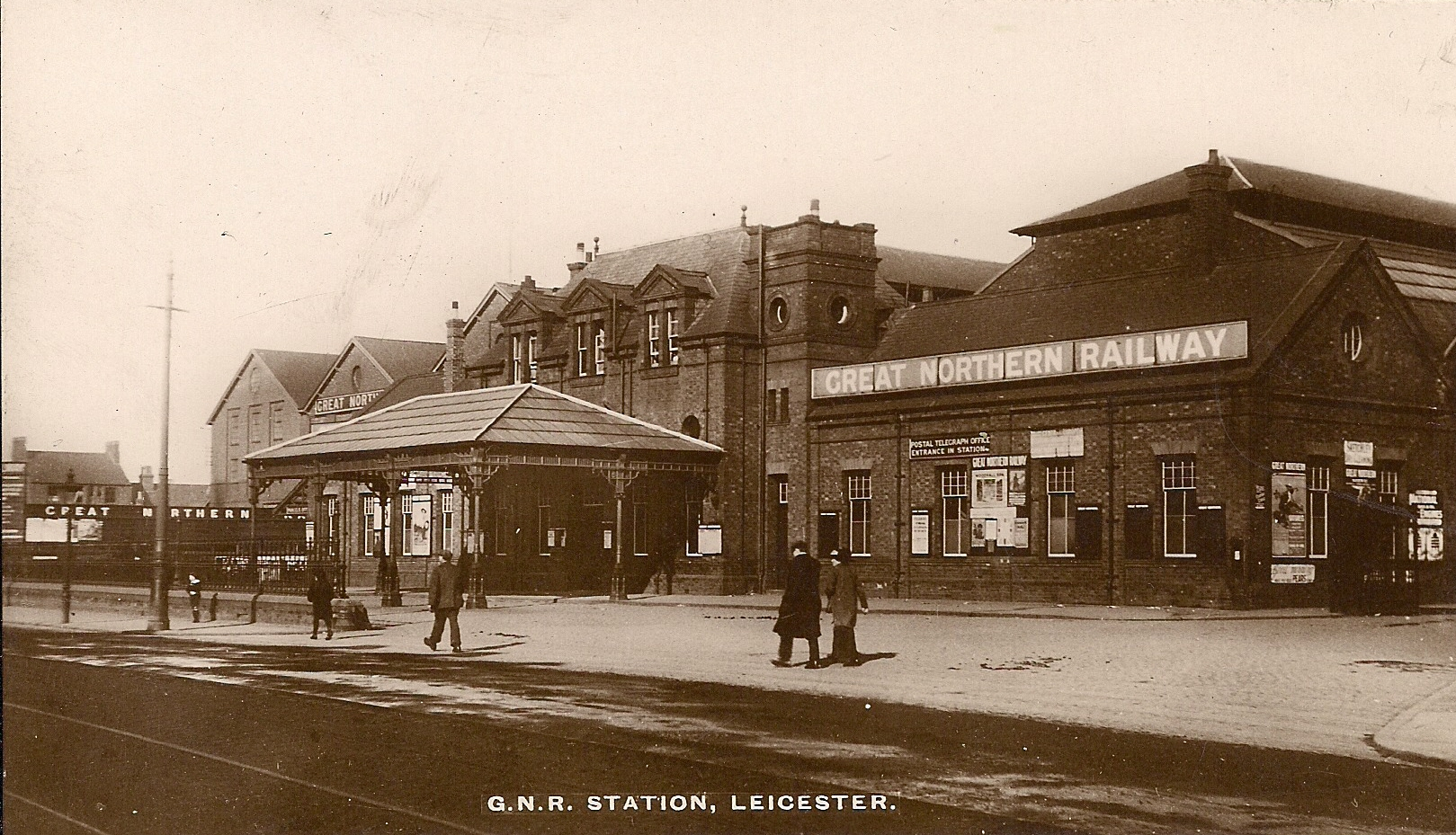
Leicester Belgrave Road station)

At Leicester the Great Northern Railway had its own commodious station at Belgrave Road, but it never saw much traffic, nor justified its four main platforms, for its maximum regular service consisted of about seven trains each way daily, plus a few seasonal holiday trains on Saturdays during the summer months. The local service usually worked to and from Grantham and was operated by GNR trains.

The impressive terminus stood three-quarters of a mile away from the city centre and represented the triumphant entry of the Great Northern Railway into a Midland Railway stronghold. Twin train sheds, each consisting of an arched roof supported on segmental iron frames springing from cast steel columns, covered the five concrete platforms. These led away from the spacious concourse which was overlooked by a grand clock adorned with a few frivolous brick decorations reminiscent of Melton North. A refreshment room lasted until the 1920s and a small bookstall closed when the Peterborough trains were withdrawn in 1916. The main building faced the road and was disappointingly plain, despite the presence of a squat tower. When the glass-roofed carriage shed was removed and a series of drainpipes were added to the walls, the front elevation became decidedly ugly. In fact the only redeeming feature was a fine pair of wrought-iron gates at the entrance to the parcels bay.

== Waltham-on-the-Wolds branch ==
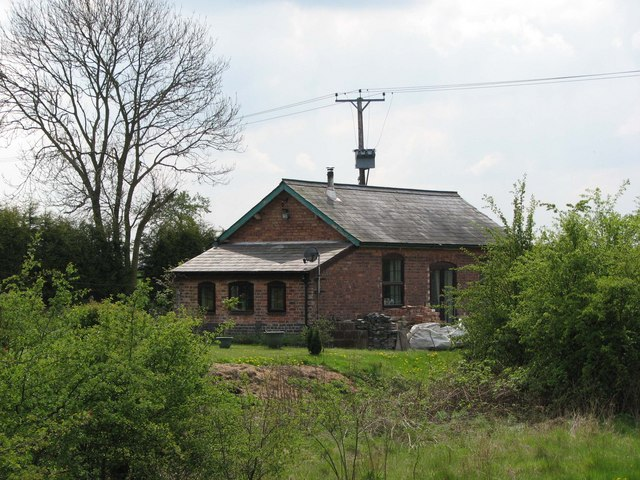
Waltham-on-the-Wolds former railway station building

The Waltham on the Wolds (Note: Waltham on the Wolds is the local spelling; some railway sources including Leleux's cartographer omit the final "s" and the index in Leleux calls it Walton-on-the-Wolds.) branch line was opened by the GNR from Scalford on 5 April 1883 to serve an ironstone area. The branch was extended to Eaton in 1884. A branch to Eastwell was opened from the Eaton branch in 1885, but it was never used.

Anderson refers to "a cable incline down the escarpment near Eastwell [which] provided an outlet for a private narrow-gauge system".

Quick provides detail of the passenger station at Waltham: it "was in the station table bank of the Great Northern Railway timetable for eleven years from May 1883, and briefly in Bradshaw, for example July 1883, but no trains were ever shown actually calling. The station was used by special trains for the Easter race meetings at Croxton Park, the first occasion being on 5 April 1883, and Waltham fair and horse sale in September; it was also occasionally used for military training camps at Croxton. Its last advertised appearance in the local press was in 1903."

== Closure ==
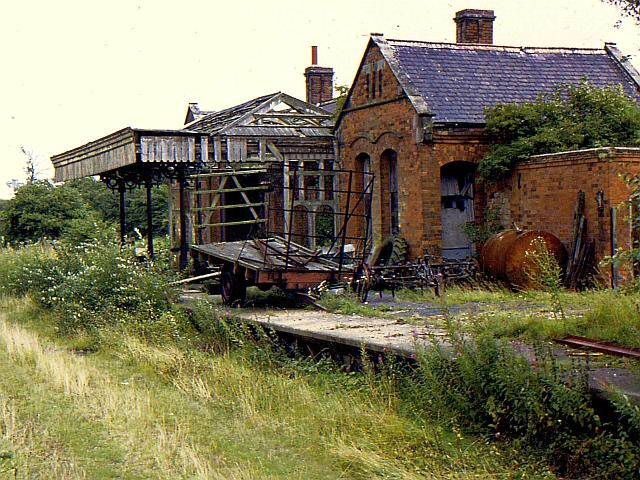
Lowesby station in 1977

In February 1953 British Railways announced its intention to withdraw all passenger services from the former GNR and LNWR lines in east Leicestershire; stations such as Tilton averaged less than two passengers a day, and only 67 people used the trains regularly. Money was being lost at the rate of £29,000 per annum. On 5 December 1953 an ancient LNWR locomotive hauled the last train from Market Harborough to Melton Mowbray. Representations concerning the hardship of workpeople had some effect, and two unadvertised services, each of one return working a day, continued to operate from John o' Gaunt to Leicester and from East Norton to Market Harborough.

These trains continued until 1957. Seasonal Saturdays-only holiday trains to Skegness ran until 1962. South of Harby & Stathern, however, the line was entirely closed in 1964.

A few fragments remained in use for a few years: the goods, coal and petrol depots at Leicester, Belgrave Road were served by a rebuilt connection from the Midland Railway. The oil depot was the last to close, on 1 January 1969. The connection on to Humberstone station had closed in 1967. An oil depot at Redmile was served by the line from Bottesford until 1970: the Bottesford south-to-west curve was reopened for this traffic. The Bottesford south-to-east curve had closed in 1962. The Waltham on the Wolds branch closed in 1964; and the line to Stathern Ironstone Sidings, a short distance south of Stathern station, closed in 1967. The GNR owned section from Bottesford (west-to-north curve) to Newark remained open until 1988.

== Location list ==
=== Main line ===
- Newark (junction);
- Cotham; opened 14 April 1879; closed 2 April 1917; reopened 1 April 1919; closed 11 September 1939;
- Bottesford North Junction;
- Bottesford South Junction;
- Bottesford New; opened 15 December 1879; renamed Bottesford South 1880; closed 1 May 1882;
- Redmile; opened 15 December 1879; closed 15 January 1951; reopened 19 March 1951; closed 7 December 1953; occasional use 1984 to 1988;
- Stathern Junction; convergence of Saxondale Junction line;
- Stathern; opened 1 December 1879; renamed Harby and Stathern 1879; closed 7 December 1953;
- Long Clawson; opened 1 September 1879; renamed Long Clawson and Hose 1884; closed 7 December 1953;
- Scalford; opened 1 September 1879; closed 7 December 1953; junction to Waltham branch;
- Melton Mowbray; opened 1 September 1879; closed 7 December 1953; later summer Saturday and Sunday use to 9 September 1962;
- Sysonby Junction;
- Great Dalby; opened 15 December 1879; closed 7 December 1953;
- Burrow and Twyford; opened 15 December 1879; renamed John o' Gaunt 1883; closed 7 December 1953; workmen's trains continued to 29 April 1957;
- Marefield Junction North;
- Marefield Junction South;
- Tilton; opened 15 December 1879; closed 7 December 1953;
- East Norton; opened 15 December 1879; closed 17 December 1953; workmen to 20 May 1957;
- Hallaton; opened 15 December 1879; closed 7 December 1953; workmen's trains to 20 May 1957;
- Hallaton Junction;
- Medbourne; opened 2 July 1883; closed 1 April 1916;
- Drayton Junction; on LNWR line.

=== Saxondale line ===
- Saxondale Junction;
- Bingham Road; opened 1 September 1879; closed 2 July 1951;
- Barnstone; opened 1 September 1879; closed 7 December 1953;
- Stathern Junction; (above).

=== Medbourne West Loop ===
- Hallaton Junction; (above);
- Welham Junction (on LNWR Rugby and Stamford line towards Market Harborough).

=== Leicester branch ===
- Leicester Belgrave Road; opened 2 October 1882; closed to public 7 December 1953; but one train each way daily for workmen until 29 April 1957; even then summer Saturday use to Skegness continued to 9 September 1962;
- Humberstone Road Junction; connection from Midland Main Line;
- Humberstone; opened 1 January 1883; closed 7 December 1953; workmen to 29 April 1957 and summer Saturday and Sunday use to 9 September 1962;
- Thurnby & Scraptoft; opened 1 January 1883; closed 7 December 1953; one train each way for workmen until 29 April 1957; summer sats and suns to 9 September 1962;
- Ingersby; opened 1 January 1883; renamed Ingarsby 1939; closed 7 December 1953; workmen to 29 April 1957;
- Lowesby; opened 1 January 1883; renamed Lowesby 1916; closed 7 December 1953; workmen to 29 April 1957; excursions later;
- Marefield Junction West;
- Marefield Junction South and North (above).
