= Scraptoft =

Village in Leicestershire, England

Coordinates: 52.646°N 1.045°W

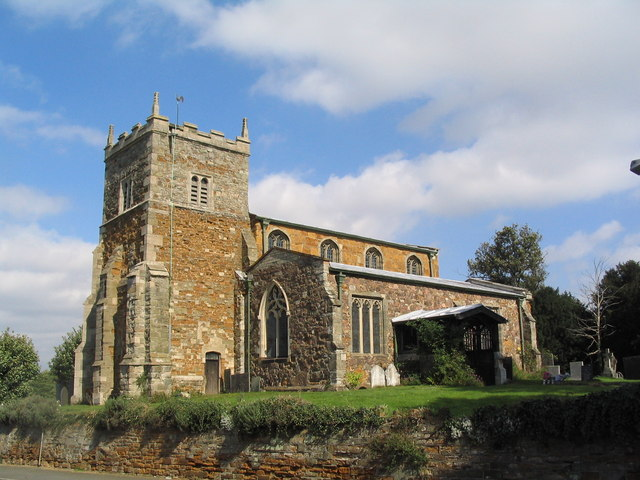
- Church of All Saints, Scraptoft

- Location within Leicestershire
- Population: 1,804 (2011 Census)
- District: Harborough
- Shire county: Leicestershire
- Region: East Midlands
- Country: England
- Sovereign state: United Kingdom
- Post town: LEICESTER
- Postcode district: LE7
- Dialling code: 0116
- Police: Leicestershire
- Fire: Leicestershire
- Ambulance: East Midlands
- UK Parliament: Harborough, Oadby and Wigston

Scraptoft is a village and civil parish in the Harborough district of Leicestershire, England. It has a population of 1,804 as measured at the 2011 census. It lies north of the A47 road east of Leicester, and runs directly into the built up area of Thurnby and Bushby to the south.

== Rail transport ==
The Thurnby and Scraptoft railway station (which connected to the Great Northern Railway) closed to passenger traffic in the mid-1950s. Seaside excursions and freight continued to use the line until around 1964, and in the early part of 1965 the track was lifted and the bridge across the road on Station Road was demolished.

== Road transport ==
Services through, to or from Scraptoft were run by Ernest Jordan of Halstead near Tilton-on-the-Hill in the early years of the 20th century. Hincks of Hungarton also ran services until c1930 when the company was taken over by the "Birmingham & Midland Motor Omnibus Co. Ltd." (B.M.M.O.), known as Midland Red. The 'BMMO' ran a service for many years through to Hungarton numbered originally 599, later renumbered to 598 (1968), 649 (1978) and finally 149 (1980) and for a period (1957-1964) was extended on to Twyford and John 'O Gaunt Station as an X64. This replaced the discontinued train service which had run previously, known as the workers' service. The Hungarton service was maintained until around 1981. A school service numbered S21 was operated for a few years in the later 1960s / early 1970s as a mornings only Scraptoft Green - Somerby Road School run. Oddly, no return afternoon facility ever existed. BMMO also ran its more regular services into Leicester originally numbered L29 from around 1930 - renumbered 93 (1972) and 79 / 89 (1980) also until 1972 a Service L15 to Oadby, Wigston and Enderby. Into the mid 1980s and 1990s, a more frequent Fox-cub mini-bus service was established by the successor of BMMO, renamed Midland Fox in the de-regulation era, initially numbered M2, later 52, the high frequency being attributed to the Leicester Polytechnic / De Montfort University Scraptoft Campus site, however the campus has since closed and been replaced with a housing development and the current service is being operated by Arriva Midlands as Services 55/56 on a much reduced frequency, with no services in the evenings or on Sundays.

Other operators known to have run services were Nesbit Bros. Coaches of Somerby which ran a Tuesdays only service to Melton Mowbray commenced in 1976 for approx. 10 years, also Fosse Travel ran a Market Harborough weekly shopper. Since the 1980s, a variety of infrequent services from the Rutland area to Leicester have passed through Scraptoft operated by Blands of Cottesmore, Nesbit Bros., Paul James Coaches, Skinners of Saltby, Kinchbus, Barton Transport, Abu & Sons, Arriva Fox County and Mark Bland Travel and these continued in some form until spring 2006.

Moving into the 21st century from the spring of 2006, the 'Rural Rider' bus service network covered Scraptoft and much of the sparsely populated East Leicestershire area. This network continued largely unchanged until May 2015 when it was discontinued with most of the routes being replaced with a taxi operated demand responsive service provided by Leicestershire County Council, however it is noted that by 2024 these taxi services have now been discontinued in East Leicestershire.

Currently in 2026, the bus services provided in the east of the county are Arriva Midlands 56/56A Leicester-Scraptoft-Thurnby circulars (currently provided part LCC subsidised / part commercially), Centrebus LC1 Melton Mowbray-Twyford-Somerby-Oakham and Centrebus LC7 Leicester-Thurnby-Bushby-Houghton-Billesdon-Belton-Uppingham (both LC1 & LC7 are totally Leicestershire County Council subsidised, and subject to regular review). Also now established to cover much of the rural areas east of Scraptoft is the ‘FoxConnect’ digital demand responsive minibus service, which is available to anybody who registers to use the service and books a journey, within the zonal areas created and to assigned transport interchange points, examples being Houghton, Thurmaston and Syston but not for direct travel into Leicester City centre.

== Facilities ==
=== Shops ===
The current newsagents on Main Street (2010) was once an inn, called the Pear Tree. The village has a small Co-operative food store, and adjacent Post office. These shops serve the passing traffic of the outlying villages to the east and north-east, most of which lack shops although a few still have public houses. During the mid-1970s there was a short-lived café on Main Street, called The Bambi Café. The premises later became a greengrocers/florists, and then a private dwelling. A garage/filling station and a hairdressing salon were also located on Main Street, both of which are now gone and replaced by private dwellings.

A public house called The White House is located on Scraptoft Lane and is constructed of Ketton stone from Normanton Hall in Rutland, demolished around 1926. The property was bought by the Northampton Brewery Company and became a hotel in 1950. It was bought by the JD Wetherspoon group in 2010.

=== Community facilities ===
Much of the village is a conservation area. The village has a Green, which at one time had the traditional red telephone box and adjacent pillar box. Over the years, with safety improvements due to increased traffic, the area has altered to become little more than a road junction. The Village Institute, or Village hall, is located by this junction and is used for community events. An open space recreation area, known as the Edith Cole memorial park, is located opposite All Saints Church, on Church Hill. About a mile to the north-east of the village, on the road to Keyham, is the newly established 'Scraptoft natural burial ground'. In 2017 a new community hall was opened named Scraptoft Community Hub this is owned and run by Scraptoft Parish Council.

== History ==
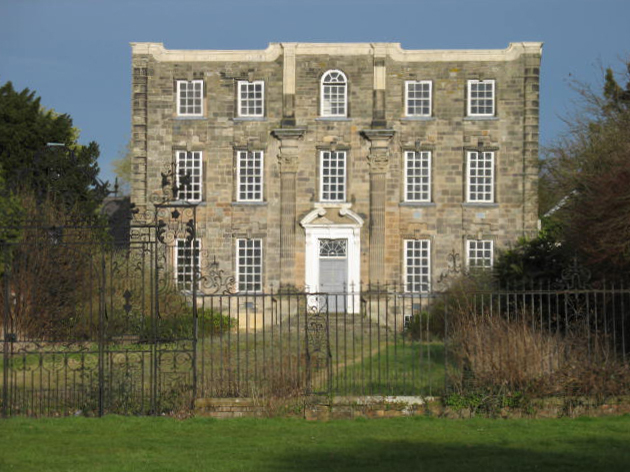
Scraptoft Hall

Scraptoft was recorded in the Domesday Book as Scrapentot, part of Gartree wapentake. It was held by Coventry Abbey, and had increased in value from 2 shillings at the time of the Norman Conquest to 40 shillings in 1086.

The village is the site of various historic buildings including Scraptoft Hall, which is a Grade II* listed building. The Hall and its grounds were for many years used as a campus of De Montfort University and its predecessors, but this facility was closed in 2003. The grounds of the Hall have since been redeveloped as housing, with the Hall itself converted to apartments.

=== Quorn Hunt ===
The Quorn Hunt at one time met regularly throughout the fox hunting season on Fridays in the village, at the Nether Hall, built in 1709. The Hunt would move off and hunt fox coverts along Covert Lane to the east of the village towards Ingarsby.

== Sport ==
The village is host to the Scraptoft golf course, and is also host to a number of sports teams at Covert Lane, including Jimmies Rugby Club. It is also home to Aylestone St James RFC. There is also a beginners running/jogging club, Scraptoft Joggers.

== Education ==
Scraptoft does not have a school. Village children attended Thurnby St. Lukes School until the late 1960s when Thurnby Somerby Road (Fernvale) School was opened, from there they went on to Manor High School (Oadby) or Gartree High School and Beauchamp College at Oadby.
