= Oadby and Wigston Borough Council elections =

Local government elections in Leicestershire, England

Oadby and Wigston Borough Council elections are held every four years. Oadby and Wigston Borough Council is the local authority for the non-metropolitan district of Oadby and Wigston in Leicestershire, England. Since the last boundary changes in 2003, 26 councillors have been elected from 10 wards.

== Council elections ==
- 1973 Oadby and Wigston Borough Council election
- 1976 Oadby and Wigston Borough Council election
- 1979 Oadby and Wigston Borough Council election (New ward boundaries)
- 1980 Oadby and Wigston Borough Council election
- 1982 Oadby and Wigston Borough Council election
- 1983 Oadby and Wigston Borough Council election
- 1984 Oadby and Wigston Borough Council election
- 1986 Oadby and Wigston Borough Council election
- 1987 Oadby and Wigston Borough Council election
- 1988 Oadby and Wigston Borough Council election (Borough boundary changes took place but the number of seats remained the same)
- 1990 Oadby and Wigston Borough Council election
- 1991 Oadby and Wigston Borough Council election
- 1995 Oadby and Wigston Borough Council election
- 1999 Oadby and Wigston Borough Council election
- 2003 Oadby and Wigston Borough Council election (New ward boundaries)
- 2007 Oadby and Wigston Borough Council election
- 2011 Oadby and Wigston Borough Council election
- 2015 Oadby and Wigston Borough Council election
- 2019 Oadby and Wigston Borough Council election
- 2023 Oadby and Wigston Borough Council election

== Election results ==
	Overall control	Lib Dem	Conservative	Labour
2023	Lib Dem	19	7	-
2019	Lib Dem	24	2	-
2015	Lib Dem	19	6	1
2011	Lib Dem	23	3	-
2007	Lib Dem	21	5	-
2003	Lib Dem	17	9	-

== Results maps ==
2003 results map

2007 results map

2011 results map

2015 results map

2019 results map

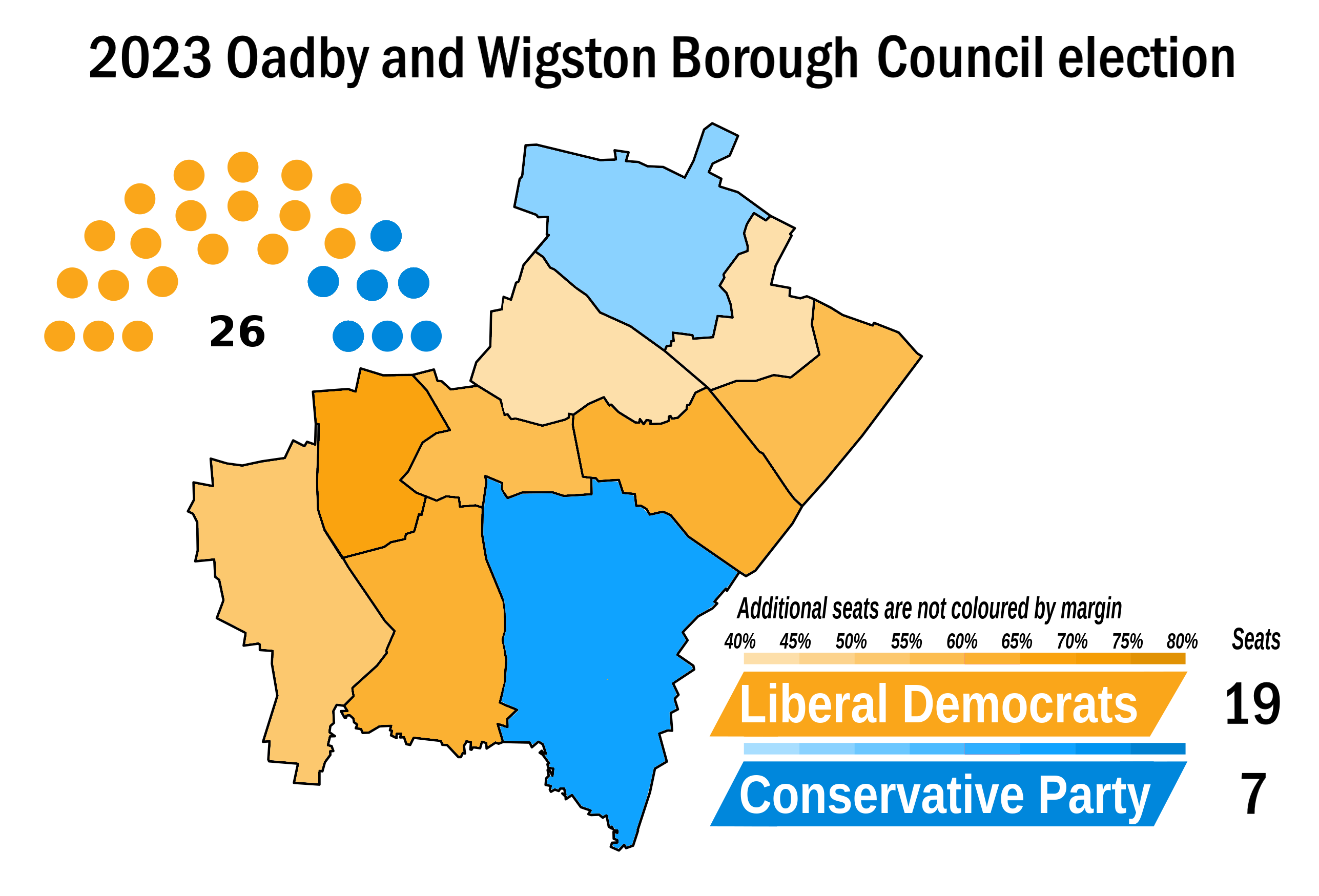
2023 results map

== By-election results ==
=== 2003-2007 ===
Meadowcroft By-Election 27 November 2003
Party	Candidate	Votes	%	±%
Conservative		806	51.7	−6.4
Liberal Democrats		754	48.3	+6.4
Majority		52	3.4	
Turnout		1,560	32.7	
Conservative hold		Swing		

=== 2007-2011 ===
Oadby Uplands By-Election 31 July 2008
Party	Candidate	Votes	%	±%
Liberal Democrats	Samia Haq	774	55.3	+1.0
Conservative	Anne Bond	625	44.7	+16.4
Majority		149	10.6	
Turnout		1,399	40.3	
Liberal Democrats hold		Swing		

=== 2015-2019 ===
Oadby Uplands By-election 21 September 2017
Party	Candidate	Votes	%	±%
Liberal Democrats	Lily Kaufman	435		
Labour	Matthew Luke	384		
Conservative	Kamal Ghattoraya	295		
Majority		51		
Turnout		1114	32.5	
Liberal Democrats gain from Labour		Swing		

=== 2019-2023 ===
Wigston Meadowcourt By-election 17 February 2022
Party	Candidate	Votes	%	±%
Conservative	Liz Darling	883	63.4	+29.4
Liberal Democrats	Michael Phipps	377	27.1	−24.6
Green	Joshua Pearman	133	9.5	+9.5
Majority		506	36.3	
Turnout		1,393		
Conservative gain from Liberal Democrats		Swing		
