= Hawker (surname) =

Hawker is a surname. Notable people with the surname include:

- Charles Hawker (1894–1938), member of the Australian House of Representatives from 1929 to 1938
- Craig Hawker (born 1964), Australian chemist
- Dave Hawker (born 1958), English former footballer
- David Hawker (born 1949) member of the Australian House of Representatives since 1983
- Edward Hawker (1782–1860), British Royal Navy admiral
- Edward William Hawker (1850–1940), politician in colonial South Australia
- George Charles Hawker (1818–1895), South Australian politician and pastoralist
- George Stanley Hawker (1894–1979), Australian politician
- Glenn Hawker (born 1961), former Australian rules footballer
- Harry Hawker (1889–1921), Australian pioneering aviator, test pilot and founder of Hawker Aviation
- Hugh Hawker, English Member of Parliament
- James Hawker (died 1827), (British Army officer)
- James Hawker (1836–1921), English poacher
- James Collins Hawker (1821–1901), English-born explorer and settler in Australia
- Lanoe Hawker (1890–1916), First World War English flying ace awarded the Victoria Cross
- Lesley Hawker (born 1981), Canadian figure skater
- Lilian Hawker (1908–1991), British mycologist
- Lindsay Hawker (1984–2007), British murder victim
- Lizzy Hawker (born 1976), British long-distance runner
- Mary Elizabeth Hawker (1848–1908), English writer of novellas and short stories
- Mike Hawker (politician) (born 1956), American Republican politician
- Patience Hawker (1900–1994), co-founder of Stawell School for girls in South Australia
- Pellew Hawker, pen name of Cora Minnett (born 1868), Australian author
- Phil Hawker (born 1962), English former footballer
- Robert Hawker (1753–1827), Devonian vicar of the Anglican Church and noted preacher
- Robert Stephen Hawker (1803–1875), English Anglican clergyman, writer and eccentric, grandson of the above
- Thomas Hawker (died 1722), English portrait painter
- Wilfred Hawker (1955–1982), Surinamese sergeant-major executed by the Surinamese government for leading a coup attempt
