= Gartree =

Gartree could refer to

- Gartree (HM Prison), a Category B men's prison located in Market Harborough, Leicestershire
- Gartree Hundred, a wapentake and later a hundred of Leicestershire, England
- Gartree High School, a Secondary School in Leicester
- Gartree (Lincolnshire), a wapentake of Lincolnshire
- Gartree, County Antrim, a townland in County Antrim, Northern Ireland
