= Hawker =

Hawker or Hawkers may refer to:

== Places ==
- Hawker, Australian Capital Territory, a suburb of Canberra
- Hawker, South Australia, a town
- Division of Hawker, an Electoral Division in South Australia
- Hawker Island, Princess Elizabeth Land, Antarctica
- Hawker Creek, Missouri, United States

== In business ==
- Hawker (centre), a place that rents out stalls for hawkers to sell their goods
- Hawker (trade), a vendor of food or merchandise
- Hawker Aircraft, a British aircraft manufacturer
- Hawkers (company), a Spanish sunglasses company

== Other uses ==
- Hawker (surname)
- One who practices falconry, hunting with hawks
- Hawker College, a senior secondary college in the Australian Capital Territory
- Hawker (dragonfly), a family of dragonflies in North America and Europe
