= Sank, Missouri =

Unincorporated community in Missouri, U.S.

- unincorporated community
- Location of Bollinger County, Missouri
- Coordinates: 37°10′18″N 90°00′49″W
- Country: United States
- State: Missouri
- County: Bollinger
- Township: Liberty
- Elevation: 397 ft (121 m)
- Time zone: UTC-6 (Central (CST))
  - Summer (DST): UTC-5 (CDT)
- Area code: 573
- GNIS feature ID: 741240

Sank is an unincorporated community in the south-central part of Liberty Township in Bollinger County, Missouri, United States. The community is accessed via a county road, one mile north of Missouri Route 51. The confluence of Clubb and Hawker creeks lies just to the southwest of the location and the Sank State Wildlife Area is located along the south side of Route 51 and Hawker Creek. Zalma lies four miles to the southwest and Dongola is three miles east. Marble Hill is about nine miles to the north-northeast along Route 51.

== History ==
Sank's name was bestowed by Jasper Cooper, who owned a store there and had applied for a post office in 1915. In choosing the post office's and community's name, he decided on the name Sank because it was the nickname of a friend and prominent man in the community, "Sank" Fowler. The post office was in operation between 1912 and 1920, and 1925–1954.
