= James Hawker =

James Hawker may refer to:

- James Hawker (Royal Navy officer) (c. 1730–1787), British Royal Navy captain
- James Hawker (British Army officer) (1773–1827), British Royal Artillery officer
- James Collins Hawker (1821–1901), English-born explorer, surveyor, diarist and pastoralist of South Australia
- James Hawker (poacher) (1836–1921), English poacher
