= Mary Swainson =

Mary Swainson (born Beatrice Mary Swainson, 23 March 1908 – 23 March 2008), was a pioneer of student counselling.

== Early life ==
Mary was born in Weston-super-Mare on 23 March 1908 to a curate father, Samuel James Swainson, and Beatrice Kelway. She was generally known as Beatrice or Bee while young, and not as Mary until her late 30s.

== Career ==
Mary was home-schooled until she was 11, then went to Gardenhurst school, Burnham-on-Sea, Somerset from the age of 11-17 and Redlands high school in Bristol as a boarder from 17-19. She took a University of London Geography degree at Exeter University (then the University College of the South West) from 1927, where she wrote for and edited the College journal, and sang in the choir. She then did a teacher training course at Exeter in 1930, gaining practical experience at Truro Teacher Training College and Truro Boys School. Between 1932 and 1934 she was Assistant Lecturer in Geography at Exeter, and then from 1934 to 1939, Lecturer in Geology and Librarian at Lincoln Teacher Training College.

Mary studied educational psychology at Oxford (1939–1941) before returning to Devon on the outbreak of the Second World War, to help her parents look after 19 evacuees. In April 1941 she returned to Exeter as a lecturer in the Geography department, attending groups led by Dr S H Foulkes and beginning personal analysis. She worked and studied at the Child Guidance Clinic. In 1945 she transferred to being a Lecturer in Education with Geography Method.

In 1947 Mary returned to Oxford to complete her DPhil and then in 1948 took a job at University College Leicester as Lecturer in Educational Psychology and Geography Method, under Professor J W (Billy) Tibble and moved with her mother (her father died in February 1948) to Oadby.

In 1948 she began offering personal counselling in the Postgraduate Department of Education at University College Leicester. By 1955 the College recognised this "Psychological Advisory Service", though it was agreed with the Principal, Charles Wilson, that undergraduates would not be offered the service, unless referred by their head of department. In September 1955, the Psychological Advisory Service became part of the new Leicester Institute of Education, which itself then became with the Department of Education, the School of Education in 1962 and Mary oversaw the growth of the service.

In the 1950s and 1960s Mary delivered papers and courses for the British Association of Psychotherapists, sat on a committee of the National Association for Mental Health, attended conferences and wrote many papers about her work (some of which are reproduced in her autobiography, the Spirit of Counsel). Under her guidance the University of Leicester was a pioneer in running intensive residential courses with the Tavistock institute of Human Relations in inter-personal and inter-group relations in Leicester from 1957, and providing counselling and psychotherapy to students in training for teaching, social work, youth leadership and speech from 1955. In 1967 Mary joined the University of Leicester Health Service, as Psychological Counsellor and worked there until she retired in 1972.

== Personal life ==
Following retirement, Mary continued to research, lecture and write, including her autobiography, The Spirit of Counsel, which details her career and developments in her thinking about counselling and the services that should be offered. She developed long-held interests in psychic studies and inner journeys and published several books with a friend, Ruth White.

Mary remained single and enjoyed travelling; in the 1930s she visited Czechoslovakia, the Basque country and Chartres.

She died on her 100th birthday.
