= Leicester urban area =

Coordinates: 52.63°N 1.13°W

The Leicester Built Up Area (BUA), Leicester Urban Area, or Greater Leicester is an urban agglomeration defined by the Office of National Statistics (ONS), centred on the City of Leicester in the East Midlands, England. It had a population of 534,820 at the time of the 2021 census, and comprises Leicester itself and its suburbs, all of which are contiguous with or situated near to the city.

As at 2011 the Greater Leicester BUA was home to 51.8% of the total population of Leicestershire (2001: 48.5%). A 2017 quote from the Leicester City Council website states that "The Greater Leicester urban area is one of the fastest growing in the country, with a population of about 650,000, of which 350,000 live within the city council area". The conurbation methodology was changed for the 2021 census to only amalgamate built up areas linked by a direct road connection, this resulted in a number of the 2011 areas being dropped but an reorganisation of the remaining and an overall increase in population.

== Analysis: 2021 ==
Leicester built-up area in 2021. Several subdivisions to the south and west dropped; other areas are separated out from the Leicester subdivision. Leicester subdivision Other subdivisions Local authority boundaries

Leicester Built-up Area 2021 Census
Urban subdivision	Population
Leicester ^{ONS}	406,580
Wigston	34,730
Oadby	24,030
Birstall	14,315
Leicester Forest East and Kirby Muxloe	13,850
Syston	13,620
Enderby and Narborough	13,180
Thurmaston	9,050
Queniborough	3,090
Littlethorpe	1,920
Total	534,820
Change % from 2011	▲5.1%

== Analysis: 2011 ==
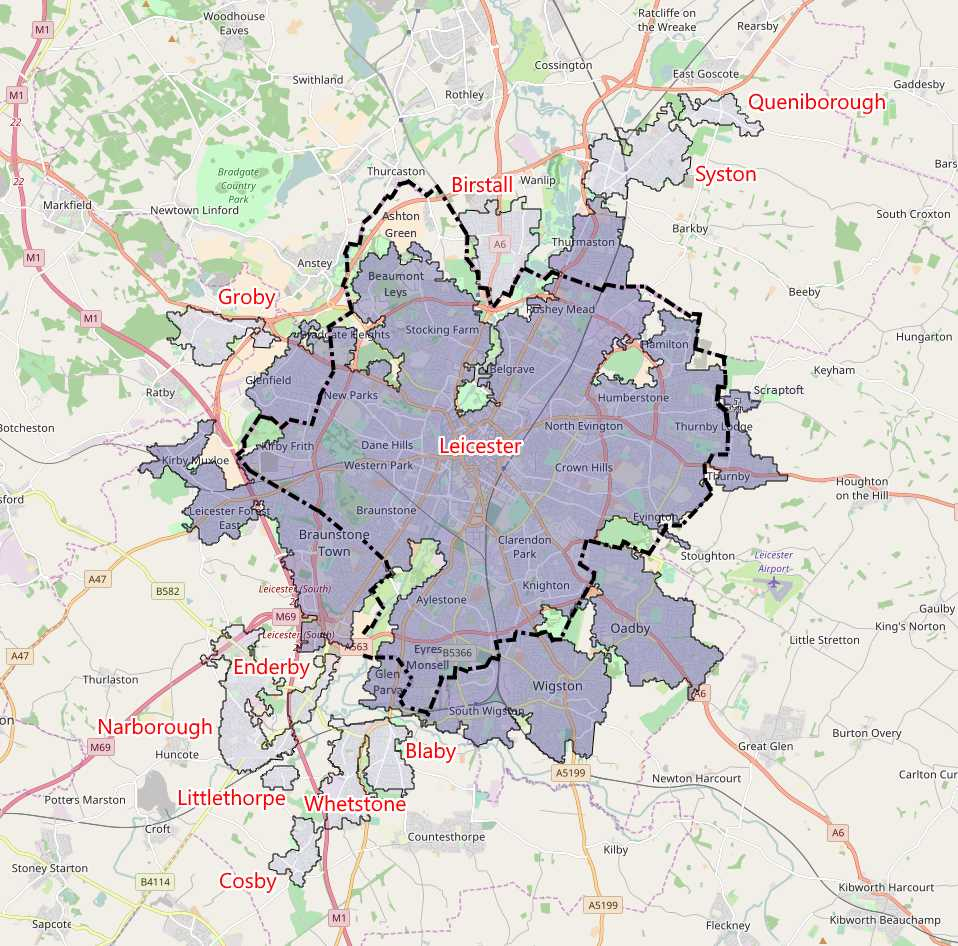
Leicester built-up area in 2011. Directly contiguous outer suburbs now merged into Leicester. Syston now a subdivision; Ratby removed completely; new south western areas included. Leicester subdivision Other subdivisions City of Leicester unitary authority boundary

Leicester Built-up Area 2011 Census
Urban subdivision	Population	
Leicester ^{ONS}	City & inner suburbs in detail City 329,283: Leicester ^{UNITARY} / 329,839; *less Ashton Green / 556; Inner suburbs 114,477: Wigston / 32,321; Oadby / 23,849; Braunstone Town / 16,850; Thurmaston / 9,668; Glenfield / 9,109; Leicester Forest East / 6,719; Glen Parva / 6,189; Kirby Muxloe / 4,667; Thurnby and Bushby / 3,301; Scraptoft / 1,804	City & inner suburbs 443,760
Narborough / Enderby	12,996	Outer suburbs 65,156
Syston	12,804	Outer suburbs 65,156
Blaby / Whetstone	12,760	Outer suburbs 65,156
Birstall	12,216	Outer suburbs 65,156
Groby	6,782	Outer suburbs 65,156
Cosby	3,506	Outer suburbs 65,156
Queniborough	2,326	Outer suburbs 65,156
Littlethorpe	1,766	Outer suburbs 65,156
Total		508,916
Change % from 2001		▲15.3%

== Analysis: 2001 ==
Leicester urban area in 2001. Northern Beaumont Leys included. Leicester subdivision Other subdivisions

Leicester Urban Area 2001 Census
Urban subdivision	Population	
Leicester ^{ONS}	City & inner suburbs in detail City 273,758: Leicester ^{UNITARY} / 279,921; *less Beaumont Leys (see below) / 5,579; *less Ashton Green / 584; Inner suburbs 56,816: Braunstone Town / 14,981; Syston / 11,608; Thurmaston / 8,945; Glenfield / 9,193; Glen Parva / 5,902; Thurnby and Bushby / 3,147; Scraptoft / 1,521; Leicester Forest East / 1,519	City & inner suburbs 330,574
Wigston	33,116	Outer suburbs 110,639
Oadby	22,679	Outer suburbs 110,639
Blaby / Whetstone	12,263	Outer suburbs 110,639
Birstall	11,480	Outer suburbs 110,639
Kirby Muxloe	9,500	Outer suburbs 110,639
Groby	6,256	Outer suburbs 110,639
Beaumont Leys	5,579	Outer suburbs 110,639
Ratby	3,862	Outer suburbs 110,639
Cosby	3,647	Outer suburbs 110,639
Queniborough	2,257	Outer suburbs 110,639
Total		441,213
Change % from 1991		▲5.8%

== Analysis: 1991 ==
Leicester urban area in 1991, with newly added southern subdivisions. Leicester subdivision Other subdivisions

Leicester Urban Area 1991 Census
Urban subdivision	Population	
Leicester ^{ONS}	City & inner suburbs in detail City 270,493 Leicester ^{UNITARY} Inner suburbs 48,025 Braunstone Town Glen Parva Glenfield Leicester Forest East Scraptoft Syston Thurmaston Thurnby and Bushby	City & inner suburbs 318,518
Wigston	32,864	Outer suburbs 98,083
Oadby	18,538	Outer suburbs 98,083
Birstall	11,770	Outer suburbs 98,083
Kirby Muxloe	7,780	Outer suburbs 98,083
Groby	7,183	Outer suburbs 98,083
Blaby	6,538	Outer suburbs 98,083
Whetstone	4,032	Outer suburbs 98,083
Ratby	3,601	Outer suburbs 98,083
Cosby	3,390	Outer suburbs 98,083
Queniborough	2,387	Outer suburbs 98,083
Total		416,601
Change % from 1981		▲3%

== Analysis: 1981 ==
Leicester urban area in 1981, showing shaded 'outer suburbs' subdivisions. The small text lists 'inner suburbs' within the Leicester ONS subdivision, but outside the unitary authority (city council) area. Leicester subdivision Other subdivisions

Leicester Urban Area 1981 Census
Urban subdivision	Population	
Leicester ^{ONS}	City & inner suburbs in detail City 276,245 Leicester ^{UNITARY} Inner suburbs 48,149 Braunstone Town Glen Parva Glenfield Leicester Forest East Scraptoft Syston Thurmaston Thurnby and Bushby	City & inner suburbs 324,394
Wigston	32,373	Outer suburbs 80,008
Oadby	18,331	Outer suburbs 80,008
Birstall	12,519	Outer suburbs 80,008
Kirby Muxloe	6,896	Outer suburbs 80,008
Groby	4,689	Outer suburbs 80,008
Ratby	3,095	Outer suburbs 80,008
Queniborough	2,105	Outer suburbs 80,008
Total		404,402

== Analysis: Notes ==
The Leicester ^{ONS} sub-totals are explained with reference to the following:

- For 2011, there have been certain reclassifications from 'outer' to 'inner suburbs' thus contributing to the increase in population of Leicester ^{ONS} compared to 2001 and prior.
- The ONS's definition of "Leicester" in the 2001 census excluded the northern area of the Beaumont Leys ward, which was counted separately, and amalgamated several surrounding towns and villages. Its boundaries and population were not the same as that of the Leicester ^{UNITARY}, which had a separate population of 279,921 at the 2001 Census and includes Beaumont Leys. See the 2001 Leicester ^{ONS} analysis.
- Ongoing refinements in methodology between the two census dates meant that contiguous suburbs, external to the city boundaries and which were subdivided up to 2001, were merged into the 2011 Leicester ^{ONS} figure. These, along with infilling at the margins, also accounted for the removal of Ratby and the addition of new subdivisions.
- Leicester ^{ONS} figures do not include the Ashton Green/Glebelands/Thurcaston Park development (containing 556 residents in 2011). Although within the city boundaries, this incipient addition is in effect a satellite village given that there is 'green separation'. This categorisation is likely to change as future residential expansion planned around the development, converges towards Beaumont Leys and Birstall; both part of the urban area/BUA.

The Kirby Muxloe figures up to 2001 includes the portion of Leicester Forest East which is to the west of the M1 motorway. The eastern section is part of the Leicester ^{ONS} subdivision, and is listed separately in the 2001 table.

Although Stoughton is shown as a small leg of the urban area, its figures are not counted.

== See also ==
- List of settlements in Leicestershire by population
- List of urban areas in the United Kingdom
- List of metropolitan areas in the United Kingdom
