= Manor High School, Oadby =

Manor High School

Location
- Copse Close; Oadby, Leicestershire, LE2 4FU; England; 52.6034°N 1.0613°W

Information
- School type: Academy (English school)
- Motto: Excellere Contende "Strive for Excellence"
- Established: c. 1968
- Founder: Walter Higgins
- Department for Education URN: 137120 Tables
- Ofsted: Reports
- Chair of Governors: Shehzad Qureshi
- Headmaster: Simon Greiff
- Gender: Coeducational
- Age: 10 to 14
- Enrolment: c. 910
- Hours in school day: 6 1/3
- Houses: Bradgate; Clarendon; Knighton; Watermead
- Colours: Grey and yellow
- Publication: Manor High School Newsletter
- Website: www.manorhigh.leics.sch.uk

Manor High School is a school with academy status for boys and girls, aged 11 to 16 (years 7-11). The school serves a suburban area to the south of the City of Leicester, although it falls outside the city's administrative boundaries, within the district of Oadby and Wigston in Leicestershire. The school has specialist technology status.

== History ==
Manor High School originally opened in 1968 as a middle school, taking children from 10 to 14 years of age. It was part of Leicestershire's changes in school structure, which the then Secretary of State for Education, Edward Short, described as making the county "an impressive name in the field of education". Short visited the school in 1970, eighteen months after it opened, when it was described as "one of the county's "showplace" schools ... [which] has been visited by hundreds of people from all over the world". The first intake of pupils were transferred from Gartree School, and pupils leaving at 14 moved to Beauchamp Grammar School. The first headmaster was Walter Higgins.

The current headmaster is Simon Grieff

== Campus ==
The school is situated on a campus shared with the neighbouring Brookside Primary School in the north-east of the borough of Oadby along with Pebbles Nursery.

== Curriculum ==
The school was one of only four of its kind in England in providing education for students aged 10 to 14. It was part of the system introduced in Leicestershire to provide for the introduction of comprehensive secondary education in the 1970s. Students transferred from primary schools at the age of 10, and sat National Curriculum Tests in the core subjects of English, Mathematics and Science after eight months at the school.
