= Oadby and Wigston =

Coordinates: 52.592°N 1.095°W

Borough of Oadby and Wigston
- Borough and non-metropolitan district
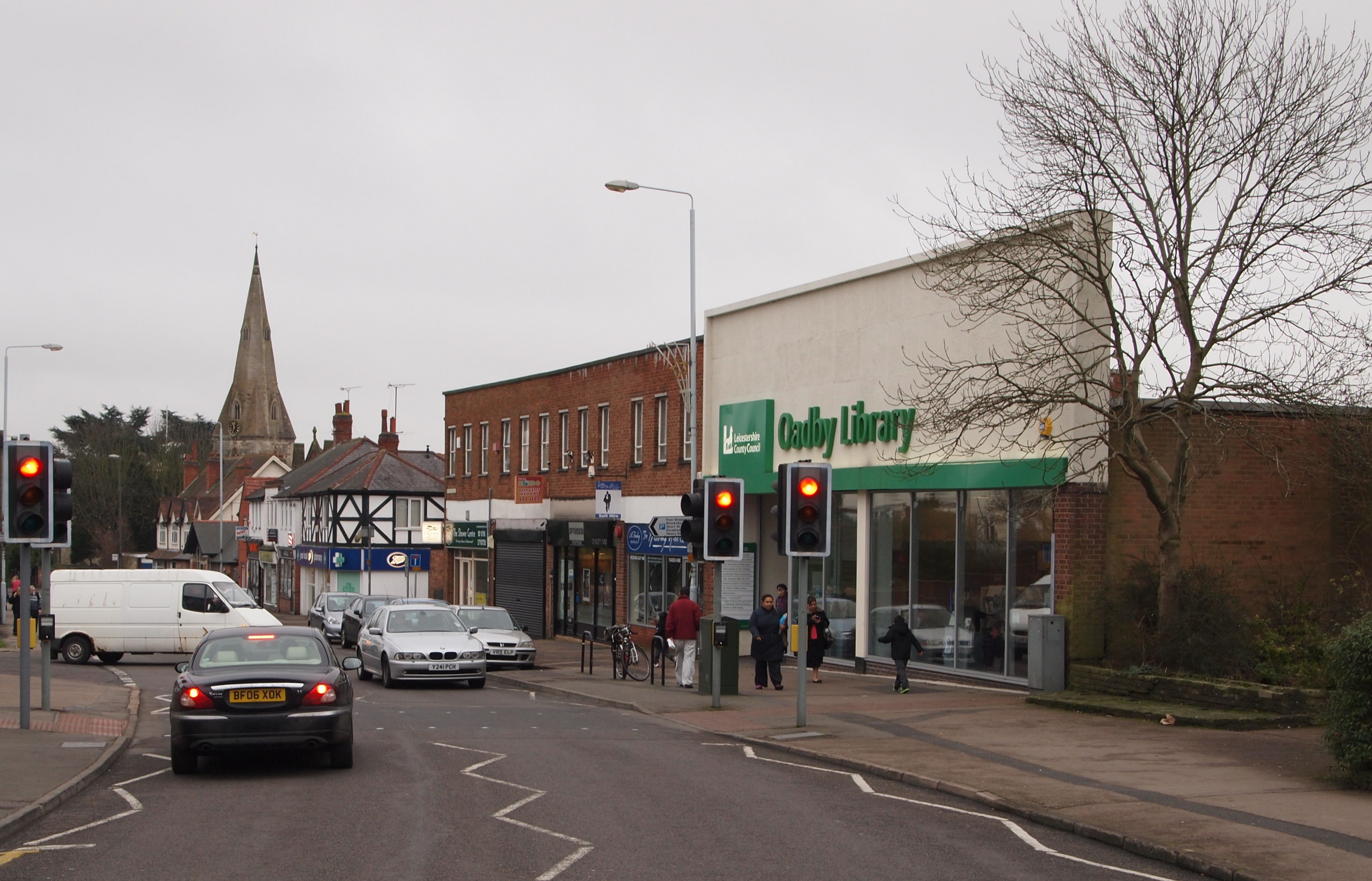
- Oadby, one of the two towns that form the borough

- Shown within Leicestershire
- Sovereign state: United Kingdom
- Constituent country: England
- Region: East Midlands
- Administrative county: Leicestershire
- Admin. HQ: Oadby

Government
  - Type: Oadby and Wigston Borough Council
  - MPs: Neil O'Brien

Area
  - Total: 9.3 sq mi (24 km^{2})
  - Rank: 286th

Population (2024)
  - Total: 61,695
  - Rank: Ranked 291st
  - Density: 6,700/sq mi (2,600/km^{2})

Ethnicity (2021)
  - Ethnic groups: List: 63.4% White; 27.9% Asian; 3.2% Mixed; 3.3% other; 2.2% Black

Religion (2021)
  - Religion: List: 36.6% Christianity; 31.9% no religion; 19.6% other; 11.9% Islam
- Time zone: UTC+0 (Greenwich Mean Time)
  - Summer (DST): UTC+1 (British Summer Time)
- ISO 3166-2: GB-LEC
- ONS code: 31UJ (ONS); E07000135 (GSS)
- NUTS 3: UKF22

Oadby and Wigston is a local government district with borough status in Leicestershire, England. It covers the two towns of Oadby, where the council is based, and Wigston, which is the larger town. Both form part of the Leicester urban area, lying south-east of the city.

The neighbouring districts are Leicester, Harborough and Blaby.

== History ==
The district was created on 1 April 1974 under the Local Government Act 1972, covering the area of two former districts, which were both abolished at the same time:

- Oadby Urban District
- Wigston Urban District

The new district was named Oadby and Wigston, combining the towns' names. The new district was awarded borough status from its creation, allowing the chair of the council to take the title of mayor.

Under current local government reform plans, the district will be abolished in 2028 with its area becoming part of an expanded Leicester unitary authority.

== Governance ==
Oadby and Wigston Borough Council

Type
- Type: Non-metropolitan district

History
- Founded: 1 April 1974

Leadership
- Mayor: Carl Walter, Liberal Democrat since 12 May 2026
- Leader: Samia Haq, Liberal Democrat since 18 Apr 2023
- Chief Executive: Anne Court since 2018

Structure
- Seats: 26 councillors
- Political groups: Administration (16) Liberal Democrat (16) Other parties (10) Conservative (5) Independent (5)
- Length of term: 4 years

Elections
- Last election: 4 May 2023

Meeting place
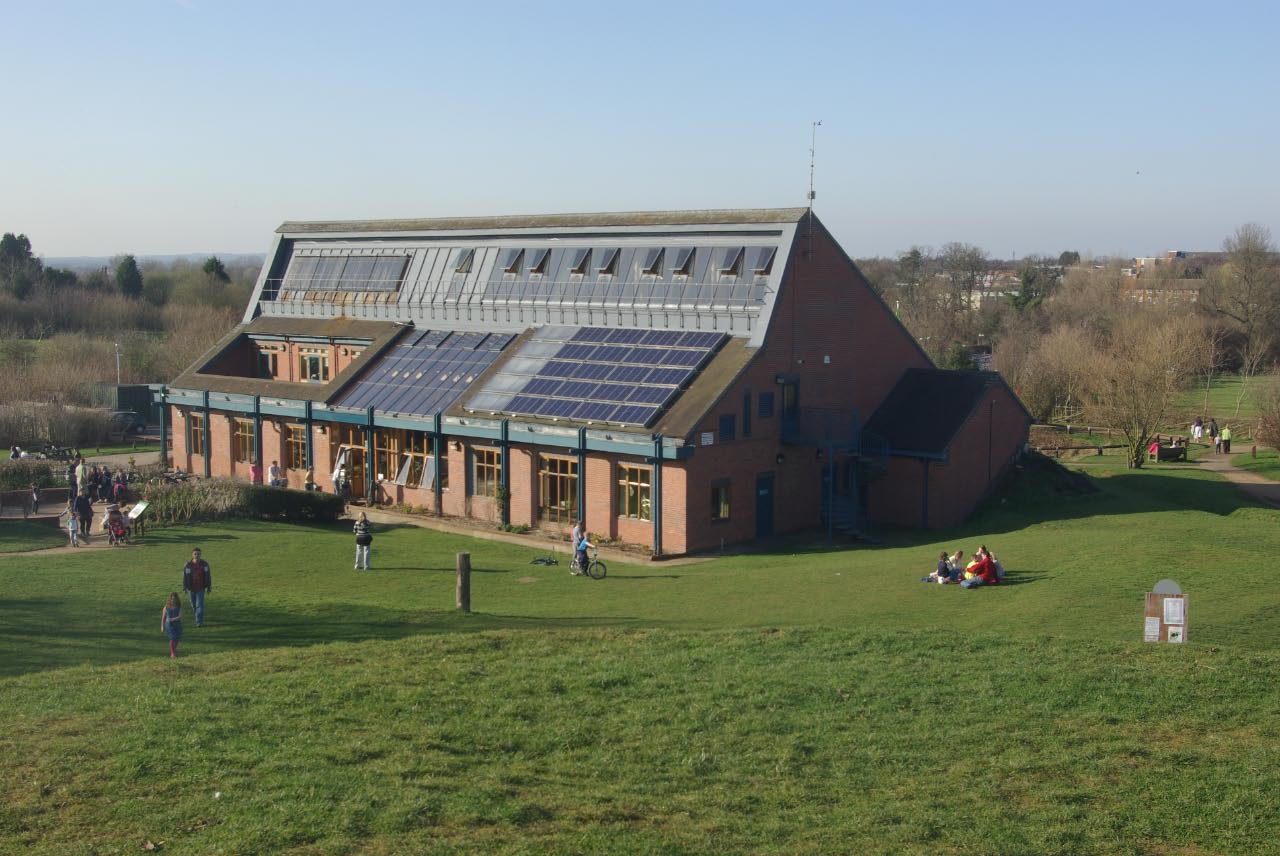
- Brocks Hill Council Offices, Washbrook Lane, Oadby, Leicester, LE2 5JJ

Website
- www.oadby-wigston.gov.uk

Oadby and Wigston Borough Council provides district-level services. County-level services are provided by Leicestershire County Council. There are no civil parishes in the borough, which is an unparished area.

=== Political control ===
The council has been under Liberal Democrat majority control since 1991.

The first election to the council was held in 1973, initially operating as a shadow authority alongside the outgoing authorities before coming into its powers on 1 April 1974. Political control of the council since 1974 has been as follows:

Party in control	Years
Conservative	1974–1991
Liberal Democrats	1991–present

=== Leadership ===
The role of mayor is largely ceremonial in Oadby and Wigston. Political leadership is instead provided by the leader of the council. The leaders since c. 2005 have been:

Councillor	Party	From	To
John Boyce	Liberal Democrats	c. 2005	18 Apr 2023
Samia Haq	Liberal Democrats	18 Apr 2023	

=== Composition ===
Following the 2023 election, and subsequent changes of allegiance up to May 2025, the composition of the council was:

Party	Councillors
Liberal Democrats	16
Conservative	5
Independent	5
Total	26

=== Elections ===
Borough council ward map

Since the last boundary changes in 2003 the council has comprised 26 councillors representing 10 wards, with each ward electing two or three councillors. Elections are held every four years.

The wards are:

- Oadby Brocks Hill (2)
- Oadby Grange (3)
- Oadby St Peter's (2)
- Oadby Uplands (2)
- Oadby Woodlands (2)
- South Wigston (3)
- Wigston All Saints (3)
- Wigston Fields (3)
- Wigston Meadowscroft (3)
- Wigston St Walstan's (3)

The district forms part of the Harborough, Oadby and Wigston parliamentary constituency.

=== Premises ===
The council meets at the Brocks Hill Council Offices in Brocks Hill Park on Washbrook Lane in Oadby.

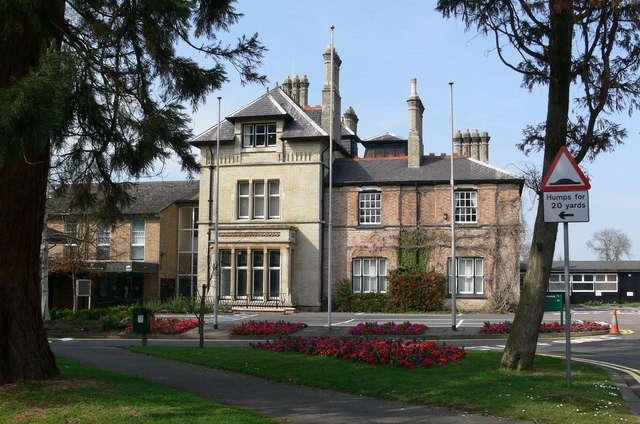
Bushloe House, Station Road, Wigston: Council headquarters 1974–2023

Until 2023 the council was based at Bushloe House on Station Road in Wigston, which had been built c. 1850 as a house and had been bought in 1942 by the old Wigston Urban District Council and converted to become its headquarters. In 2023 the council moved its meetings and offices to the Brocks Hill offices in Oadby.

== Geography ==
It is composed of the areas of Oadby, Wigston, South Wigston and the hamlet of Kilby Bridge. It is predominantly urban, and borders Leicester directly to the north-west. There are no civil parishes in the district.

The most northerly corner is near the junction of the A6030 and B582, and near the Spire hospital it meets Harborough. It runs along the B582 then along the former Roman road (which runs to Corby), passing the playing fields of the University of Leicester. It passes along the north edge of Oadby Lodge, a farm owned by the Co-op. Towards the deserted village of Stretton Magna (outside the district), the boundary passes southwestwards. This area was proposed to be the site of the eco-town Pennbury. It crosses the A6 at Glen Gorse Golf Club. It crosses Newton Lane and the Midland Main Line. It crosses the Grand Union Canal, and towards Kilby it meets the district of Blaby at the River Sence. It follows the River Sence, crossing the A5199 (Welford Road). At Rose Farm it follows Countesthorpe Road towards South Wigston, to the Grand Union Canal, crossing the former Midland Counties Railway, which it follows westwards. It passes northwards across St Thomas Road (B582) and the Birmingham to Peterborough Line. It passes northwards on the east side of the Glen Parva prison (in Blaby district). It meets Leicester UA south of Eyres Monsell, a large housing estate.

Following the Leicester boundary, it crosses Saffron Road (B5366), then follows Dorset Avenue, follows the Midland Main Line northwards, crossing Aylestone Lane (B5418), then crosses the Midland Main Line. It crosses the Welford Road (A5199) at the point where the road becomes a dual-carriageway south of the Best Western Leicester Stage Hotel (in Leicester UA). It passes on the south edge of Knighton Park, and the western edge of Oadby Golf Club, west of Leicester Racecourse (in the district). Near the racecourse entrance it crosses the A563 southern ring road, then London Road (A6), passing northwards along the western edge of the University of Leicester's Oadby Student Village, west of the University of Leicester Botanic Garden (in the district).

== Demography ==
Population growth in Oadby and Wigston
Year	1951	1961	1971	1981	1991	2001	2011	2016	2021	2031
Population	23,943	34,206	50,253	50,014	51,542	55,773	56,170	55,800	56,500	59,700
Census								ONS	ONS Projections	

== Education ==
Both Beauchamp College, in the south of Oadby, and Wigston College, on the B582 in Wigston, are former grammar schools. Both were upper schools, as the three tier system operated in the district's schools. Also near the council offices on the B582 is South Leicestershire College, an FE college. Next to the Beauchamp College is Gartree High School, a former middle school. Another school is Manor High School, Oadby, which was the largest middle school in the country.

== Coat of arms ==
Coat of arms of Oadby and Wigston

Notes
Granted 3 December 1975 by the College of Arms.
Crest
An owl affronty supporting with the wings a brown pelt charged with a shuttle erect all Proper.
Torse
Argent and Gules.
Escutcheon
Quarterly Gules and Vert on a bend Or between in the second and third quarters two barns gemelles Or surmounted of a pile reversed Argent a lion's gamb erased Gules between two pierced cinquefoils Ermine.
Supporters
Dexter a lamb guardant Argent sinister a tiger guardant the tail reflexed upwards along the exterior thigh Proper.
Motto
Obtain Wisdom

== Freedom of the borough ==
The following people, military units and Organisations have received the Freedom of the Borough of Oadby and Wigston.

=== Individuals ===
- H. Embacher: 1988.

=== Military units ===
- The Royal Anglian Regiment: 2011.
- B Squadron Leicestershire and Derbyshire Yeomanry, Royal Yeomanry: 17 April 2012.

=== Organisations and groups ===
- The University of Leicester: 13 September 2021.

== Gallery ==
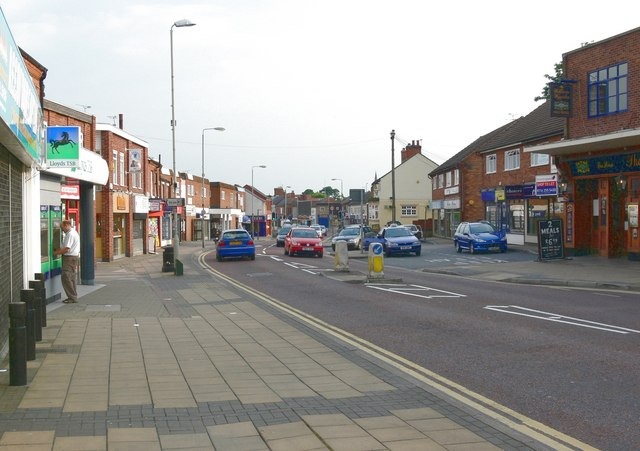
Wigston Magna, one of the two towns that form the borough

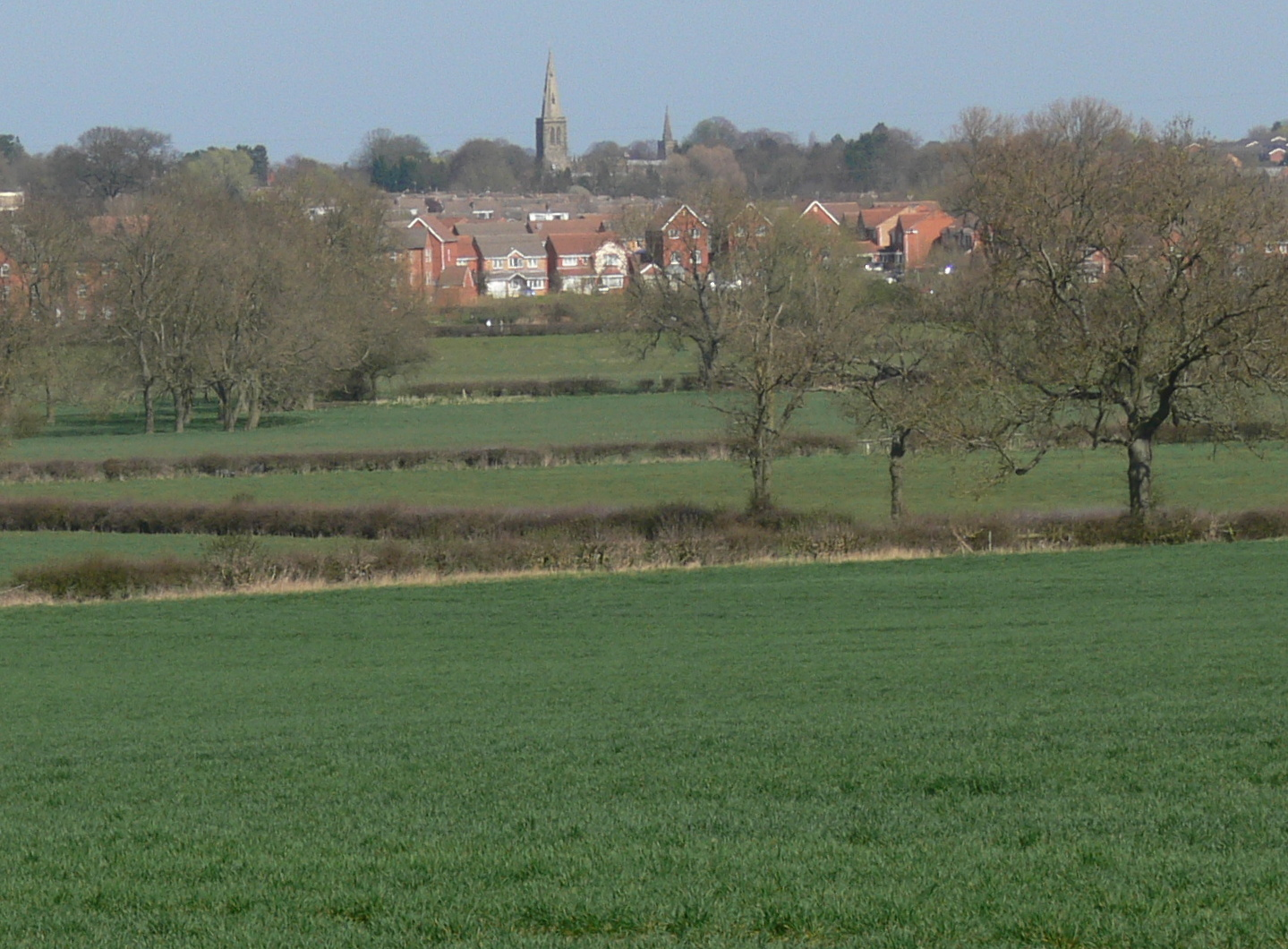
South Wigston, the largest village in the borough

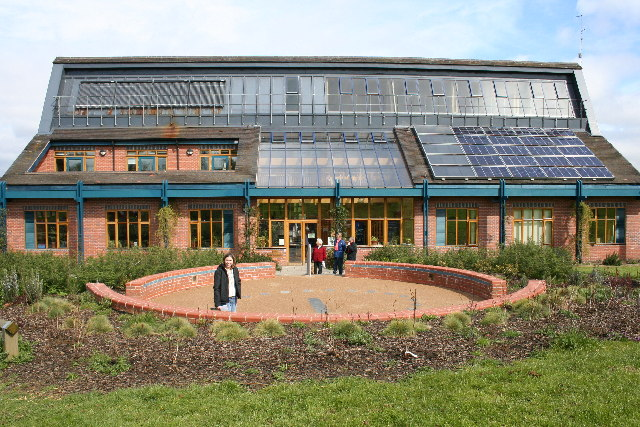
Brocks Hill Borough Council offices at Brocks Hill Country Park

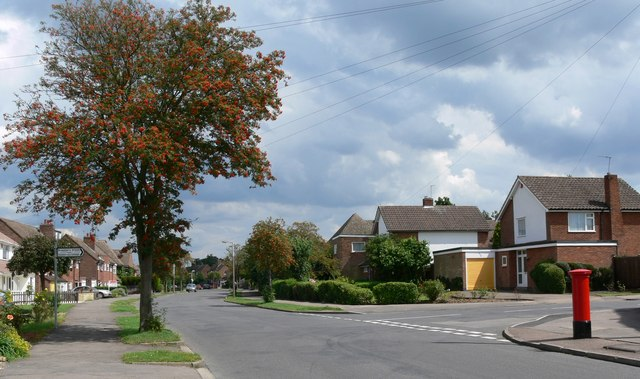
Ash Tree Road in Oadby

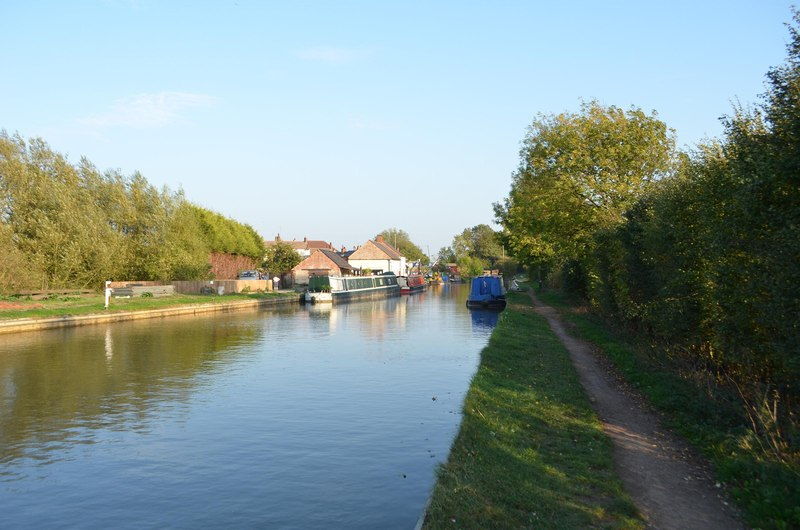
Grand Union Canal - Kilby Bridge

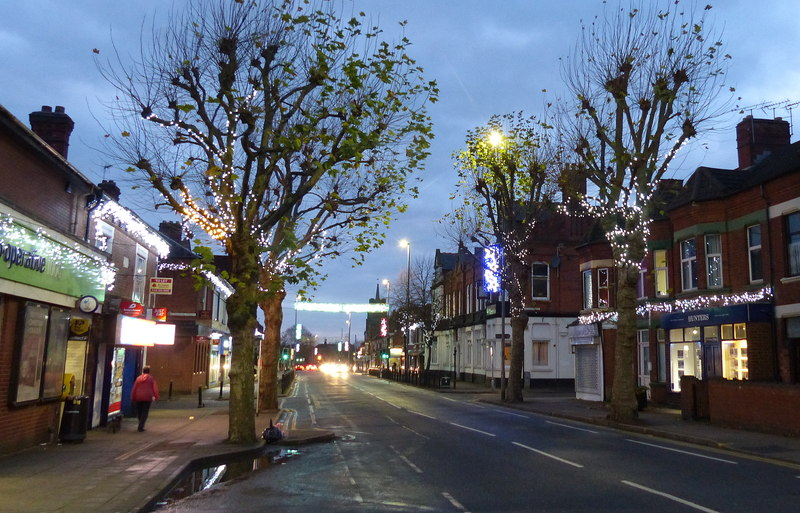
South Wigston, Blaby Road
