= Clubb Creek =

Stream in the U.S. state of Missouri

Coordinates: 37°10′05″N 90°01′01″W

Clubb Creek is a stream in Bollinger County in the U.S. state of Missouri. It is a tributary of Hawker Creek.

Clubb Creek has the name Abe Clubb, a pioneer settler.

== See also ==
- List of rivers of Missouri
