= 2019 Oadby and Wigston Borough Council election =

2019 local elections in Oadby and Wigston

- 2 May 2019

All 26 seats to Oadby and Wigston 14 seats needed for a majority

	First party	Second party
Party	Liberal Democrats	Conservative
Seats won	24	2
Seat change	▲5	▼4
- Map of the results of the election by ward

Elections to Oadby and Wigston Borough Council took place on 2 May 2019, the same day as other United Kingdom local elections. All wards were up for election, each with 2 or 3 councillors to be elected. The Liberal Democrats retained overall control of the council.

== Election results ==
Oadby and Wigston Borough Council election, 2019
Party	Candidates						Votes		
Party	Stood	Elected	Gained	Unseated	Net	% of total	%	No.	Net %
Liberal Democrats	26	24	5	0	▲5	92.3%	66.7%	22,816	▲9.5%
Conservative	20	2	0	4	▼4	7.7%	25.0%	8,547	▼0.5%
Labour	9	0	0	1	▼1	0%	7.9%	2,700	▼6.3%
Green	1	0	0	0	Steady	0%	0.4%	138	▼0.3%

== Ward results ==
Ward boundaries

=== Oadby Brocks Hill ===
Oadby Brocks Hill (2 seats)
Party	Candidate	Votes	%	±%
Liberal Democrats	Jeffrey Kaufman *	922	76.1	
Liberal Democrats	Mohammed Latif Darr *	867	71.6	
Conservative	Richard Ronald Harrison	306	25.3	
Conservative	Amandeep Kaur Marwaha	208	17.2	
Turnout		1,232	39.44	
Registered electors		3,124		
Liberal Democrats hold		Swing		
Liberal Democrats hold		Swing		

=== Oadby Grange ===
Oadby Grange (3 seats)
Party	Candidate	Votes	%	±%
Conservative	Pritibala Joshi	715	52.3	
Conservative	Fula Singh Ghattoraya	685	50.1	
Liberal Democrats	Naveed Alam	640	46.8	
Liberal Democrats	Santokh Singh Athwal	638	46.7	
Conservative	Mohammed Salim Rezah Boodhoo	614	44.9	
Liberal Democrats	Muhammed Hafeez Katib	564	41.3	
Turnout		1,389	35.53	
Registered electors		3,124		
Conservative hold		Swing		
Conservative hold		Swing		
Liberal Democrats gain from Conservative		Swing		

=== Oadby St Peter's ===
Oadby St Peter's
Party	Candidate	Votes	%	±%
Liberal Democrats	David Carter	596	47.9	
Liberal Democrats	Ian Ridley	569	45.8	
Conservative	Marcus Solanki	344	27.7	
Conservative	Karl Craig-West	328	26.4	
Labour	Cameron Beaver	295	23.7	
Labour	Emma Hudson-Beaver	281	22.6	
Majority		227	18.1	
Turnout		1,270	{{{percentage}}}	
Liberal Democrats hold		Swing		
Liberal Democrats gain from Conservative		Swing		

=== Oadby Uplands ===
Oadby Uplands
Party	Candidate	Votes	%	±%
Liberal Democrats	Samia Haq	610	41.0	
Liberal Democrats	Lily Kaufman	570	38.4	
Conservative	Sundeep Biring	458	30.8	
Labour	Hajira Piranie	419	28.2	
Conservative	Jagjit Sahota	417	28.1	
Labour	Peter Whalen	385	25.9	
Majority		112	7.6	
Turnout		1,506	{{{percentage}}}	
Liberal Democrats hold		Swing		
Liberal Democrats gain from Labour		Swing		

=== Oadby Woodlands ===
Oadby Woodlands
Party	Candidate	Votes	%	±%
Liberal Democrats	Dean Gamble	657	52.4	
Liberal Democrats	Amandeep Kaur	580	46.3	
Conservative	Bhupendra Dave	456	36.4	
Conservative	Karanvir Ghattoraya	342	27.3	
Labour	Adam Krupa	183	14.6	
Green	Pauline Pratt	138	11.0	
Majority		124	9.9	
Turnout		1,267	{{{percentage}}}	
Liberal Democrats hold		Swing		
Liberal Democrats gain from Conservative		Swing		

=== South Wigston ===
South Wigston
Party	Candidate	Votes	%	±%
Liberal Democrats	Rosemarie Adams	848	55.2	
Liberal Democrats	John Boyce	792	51.5	
Liberal Democrats	Richard Morris	745	48.5	
Conservative	Mason Shipley-Jones	377	24.5	
Conservative	Jack Taylor	364	23.7	
Conservative	Oliver Bryan	347	22.6	
Labour	Helen Beynon	312	20.3	
Labour	Stephen Maggs	290	18.9	
Labour	Scott Towers	289	18.8	
Majority		368	24.0	
Turnout		1,567	{{{percentage}}}	
Liberal Democrats hold		Swing		
Liberal Democrats hold		Swing		
Liberal Democrats hold		Swing		

=== Wigston All Saints ===
Wigston All Saints
Party	Candidate	Votes	%	±%
Liberal Democrats	Lee Bentley	1,182	75.9	
Liberal Democrats	Lynda Eaton	1,157	74.3	
Liberal Democrats	Michael Charlesworth	1,140	73.2	
Conservative	Callum Darling	324	20.8	
Majority		816	52.4	
Turnout		1,594	{{{percentage}}}	
Liberal Democrats hold		Swing		
Liberal Democrats hold		Swing		
Liberal Democrats hold		Swing		

=== Wigston Fields ===
Wigston Fields
Party	Candidate	Votes	%	±%
Liberal Democrats	Helen Loydall	1,165	78.2	
Liberal Democrats	Bill Boulter	1,152	77.3	
Liberal Democrats	Kevin Loydall	1,097	73.6	
Conservative	Jack Newcombe	325	21.8	
Majority		772	51.8	
Turnout		1,524	{{{percentage}}}	
Liberal Democrats hold		Swing		
Liberal Democrats hold		Swing		
Liberal Democrats hold		Swing		

=== Wigston Meadowcourt ===
Wigston Meadowcourt
Party	Candidate	Votes	%	±%
Liberal Democrats	David Loydall	891	55.0	
Liberal Democrats	Robert Eaton	857	52.9	
Liberal Democrats	Sharon Morris	847	52.3	
Conservative	Helen Darling	587	36.2	
Conservative	Edward Barr	531	32.8	
Conservative	Shingara Dhillon	460	28.4	
Labour	Maureen Waugh	246	15.2	
Majority		260	16.1	
Turnout		1,652	{{{percentage}}}	
Liberal Democrats hold		Swing		
Liberal Democrats gain from Conservative		Swing		
Liberal Democrats hold		Swing		

=== Wigston St Wolstan's ===
Wigston St Wolstan's
Party	Candidate	Votes	%	±%
Liberal Democrats	Frank Broadley	1,266	80.0	
Liberal Democrats	Linda Broadley	1,265	79.9	
Liberal Democrats	Clare Kozlowski	1,199	75.7	
Conservative	Mukesh Dave	359	22.7	
Majority		840	53.0	
Turnout		1,618	{{{percentage}}}	
Liberal Democrats hold		Swing		
Liberal Democrats hold		Swing		
Liberal Democrats hold		Swing		

== Changes 2019–2023 ==
- Naveed Alam, elected as a Liberal Democrat, left the party in January 2023 to sit as a Conservative, citing dissatisfaction with the Liberal Democrat administration's record on parking charges, green bin collections and housing consultation.

== By-elections ==
=== Wigston Meadowcourt ===
The Wigston Meadowcourt by-election was triggered by the death of Liberal Democrat councillor Robert Eaton on 28 December 2021, who had served since 2011.

Wigston Meadowcourt: 17 February 2022
Party	Candidate	Votes	%	±%
Conservative	Liz Darling	883	63.4	N/A
Liberal Democrats	Michael Phipps	377	27.1	N/A
Green	Joshua Pearman	133	9.5	N/A
Majority		506	36.3	
Turnout		1,401	28.5	
Registered electors		4,919		
Conservative gain from Liberal Democrats		Swing		
