= 2015 Oadby and Wigston Borough Council election =

Oadby and Wigston Borough Council Election, 2015
- 7 May

26 seats up for election 14 seats needed for a majority
	First party	Second party	Third party
Party	Liberal Democrats	Conservative	Labour
Last election	23	3	0
Seats won	19	6	1
Seat change	-4	+3	+1
- Results of the 2015 Oadby and Wigston Borough Council election
Council Control before election
Liberal Democrats
Elected Council Control
Liberal Democrats

The 2015 Oadby and Wigston Borough Council election took place on 7 May 2015 to elect all 26 members of Oadby and Wigston Borough Council in England. This was on the same day as other local elections.

== Ward results ==
=== Brocks Hill (2) ===
Brocks Hill
Party	Candidate	Votes	%	±%
Liberal Democrats	Jeffrey Kaufman	979		
Liberal Democrats	Latif Darr	916		
Conservative	Ruby Gill	624		
Labour	Jilly Kay	537		
Conservative	Richard Harrison	528		
UKIP	Mark Hunt	247		
Liberal Democrats hold				

=== Oadby Grange (3) ===
Oadby Grange
Party	Candidate	Votes	%	±%
Conservative	Bob Fahey	1,355		
Conservative	Teck Keong Khong	1,193		
Conservative	Ravendra Thakor	1,080		
Liberal Democrats	Sarah Anne Dickinson	890		
Liberal Democrats	Naveed Alam	877		
Liberal Democrats	Santokh Singh Athwal	820		
Labour	Michael Oatway	725		
Labour	Matthew William Luke	703		
Labour	Hajira Hanif Piranie	629		
Conservative hold				
Conservative hold				
Conservative gain from Liberal Democrats				

=== Oadby St Peter's (2) ===
Oadby St Peter's
Party	Candidate	Votes	%	±%
Liberal Democrats	David Michael Carter	1,022		
Conservative	Anne Rosemary Bond	870		
Liberal Democrats	Lily Kaufman	858		
Labour	Christopher Samuel Marlow	571		
Green	Adam Stefan Krupa	398		
Liberal Democrats hold				
Conservative gain from Liberal Democrats				

=== Oadby Uplands (2) ===
Oadby Uplands
Party	Candidate	Votes	%	±%
Liberal Democrats	Samia Zuffar Haq	1,059		
Labour	Gurpal Atwal	902		
Liberal Democrats	Alan Richard Wood	872		
Conservative	Kiran Solanki	835		
Liberal Democrats hold				
Labour gain from Liberal Democrats				

=== Oadby Woodlands (2) ===
Oadby Woodlands
Party	Candidate	Votes	%	±%
Liberal Democrats	Dean Adam Gamble	1,089		
Conservative	Bhupendra Dave	994		
Liberal Democrats	Pritibala Joshi	851		
Conservative	Narendra Waghela	665		
Labour	Roy Kind	616		
Liberal Democrats hold				
Conservative gain from Liberal Democrats				

=== South Wigston (3) ===
South Wigston
Party	Candidate	Votes	%	±%
Liberal Democrats	John William Boyce	1,531		
Liberal Democrats	Richard Edward Morris	1,415		
Liberal Democrats	Sharon Beverley Morris	1,372		
Conservative	Dean Joseph Weston	1292		
Labour	Scott Michael Towers	880		
Liberal Democrats hold				

=== Wigston All Saints (3) ===
Wigston All Saints
Party	Candidate	Votes	%	±%
Liberal Democrats	Lee Bentley	1,833		
Liberal Democrats	Michael Charlesworth	1,671		
Liberal Democrats	Lynda Eaton	1,658		
Conservative	David Beaumont	1040		
Labour	Paul Green	578		
Liberal Democrats hold				

=== Wigston Fields (3) ===
Wigston Fields
Party	Candidate	Votes	%	±%
Liberal Democrats	Bill Boulter	1,726		
Liberal Democrats	Helen Loydall	1,673		
Liberal Democrats	Kevin Loydall	1,527		
Conservative	Christie Townsend	850		
Labour	Richard Stewart Price	826		
Liberal Democrats hold				

=== Wigston Meadowcourt (3) ===
Wigston Meadowcourt
Party	Candidate	Votes	%	±%
Liberal Democrats	Marie Vickie Chamberlain	1,450		
Conservative	Ted Barr	1,357		
Liberal Democrats	Robert Frederick Eaton	1,214		
Independent	Jill Gore	1156		
Liberal Democrats	Clare Denise Kozlowski	869		
Labour	Maureen Waugh	480		
Liberal Democrats hold				
Conservative hold				
Liberal Democrats hold				

=== Wigston St Wolstan's (3) ===
Wigston St Wolstan's
Party	Candidate	Votes	%	±%
Liberal Democrats	Linda Broadley	1,761		
Liberal Democrats	Frank Broadley	1,683		
Liberal Democrats	Kerree Chalk	1,586		
Conservative	Alex Darling	1126		
Conservative	Liz Darling	1026		
Labour	Peter Cook	811		
Liberal Democrats hold				
