= George Shingler =

English cricketer

Personal information
- Full name: George Shingler
- Born: 15 May 1882; Leicester, Leicestershire, England
- Died: 5 May 1946 (aged 63); Queniborough, Leicestershire, England
- Batting: Right-handed
- Bowling: Unknown

Domestic team information
- Years: Team
- 1920–1921: Leicestershire

Career statistics
Competition	First-class
Matches	4
Runs scored	76
Batting average	9.50
100s/50s	–/–
Top score	26
Balls bowled	138
Wickets	–
Bowling average	–
5 wickets in innings	–
10 wickets in match	–
Best bowling	–
Catches/stumpings	5/–
- Source: Cricinfo, 21 January 2013

George Shingler (15 May 1882 – 5 May 1946) was an English cricketer. Shingler was a right-handed batsman whose bowling style is unknown. He was born in Leicester, Leicestershire.

Shingler made his first-class debut for Leicestershire against Lancashire in the 1920 County Championship at Aylestone Road, Leicester. He made three further first-class appearances for the county, the last of which came against Glamorgan in the 1921 County Championship. In his four first-class matches, he scored a total of 76 runs at an average of 9.50, with a high score of 26.

He died at Queniborough, Leicestershire on 5 May 1946.
