= Thurnby =

Village in Leicestershire, England

Coordinates: 52.63°N 01.04°W

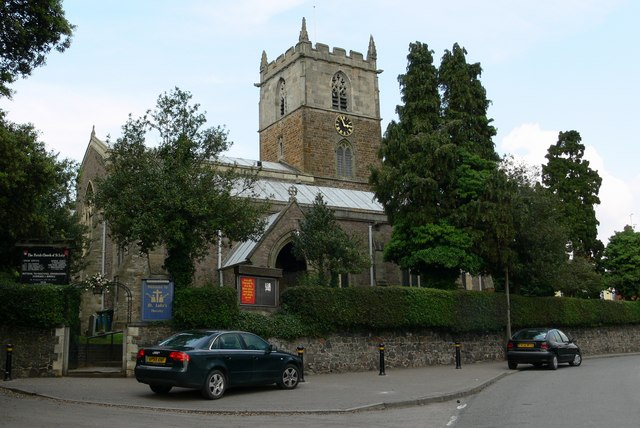

- Location within Leicestershire
- OS grid reference: SK6504
- Civil parish: Thurnby and Bushby
- District: Harborough
- Shire county: Leicestershire
- Region: East Midlands
- Country: England
- Sovereign state: United Kingdom
- Post town: Leicester
- Postcode district: LE7
- Dialling code: 0116
- Police: Leicestershire
- Fire: Leicestershire
- Ambulance: East Midlands
- UK Parliament: Rutland and Stamford

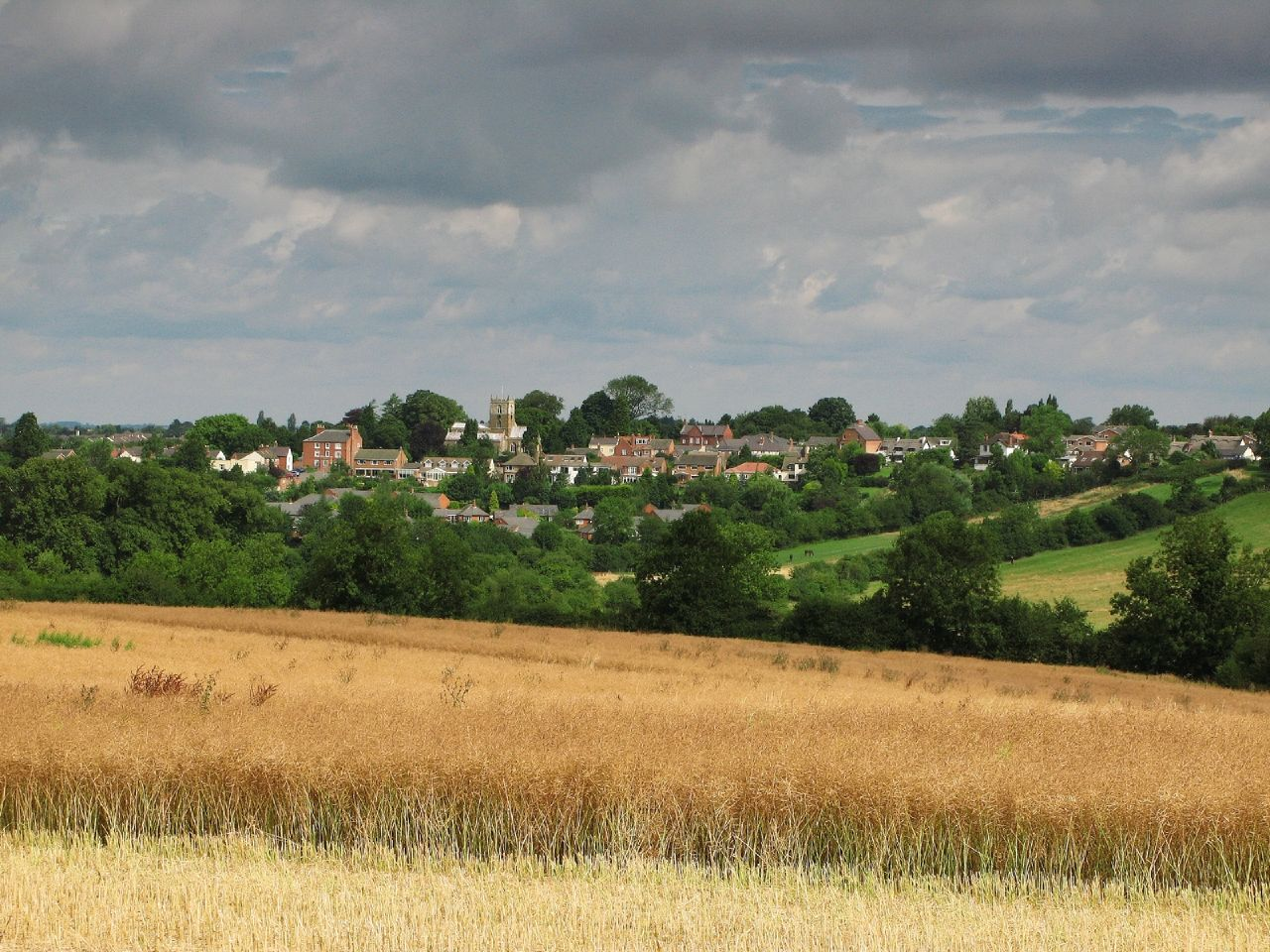
St.Luke's C of E Church at the centre of Thurnby

Thurnby is a village and former civil parish, now in the parish of Thurnby and Bushby, in the Harborough district, in the county of Leicestershire, England. It is just east of Leicester's city boundaries.

Thurnby village proper is set to the south of the A47, just after it leaves the city. A sister village, Bushby lies just to the east and merges into it. To the west is Evington and Thurnby Lodge in Leicester proper, to the north is Scraptoft and to the south and east are open countryside – the next villages in these directions are Stoughton and Houghton on the Hill.

== History ==
Thurnby is not mentioned in the Domesday Book, possibly being considered part of Stoughton, but is recorded by the 13th century.

By 1563 there were 40 households recorded in Thurnby and Bushby but the population declined in the following years, with only 22 households by 1670 – however there is little population data available surrounding much of the general history.

Thurnby church, now St Luke's, originates from around 1143 although many alterations and restorations have occurred since the original build.

== Amenities ==
Thurnby has two primary schools, Fernvale Primary and St Lukes C of E primary school, which has strong links with St. Lukes Church.

There is now only one public house, The Rose & Crown, as The Swallow has since closed.

There is a large Scout and Guide group, situated on Court Road.

== Civil parish ==
On 1 April 1936, the parish of Bushby was merged with Thurnby, part of Thurnby became part of Leicester, on 11 November 1999 the parish was renamed "Thurnby & Bushby". In 1931 the parish of Thurnby (prior to the merge) had a population of 348.
