= Bushby =

Village in Leicestershire, England

Coordinates: 52.63°N 01.04°W

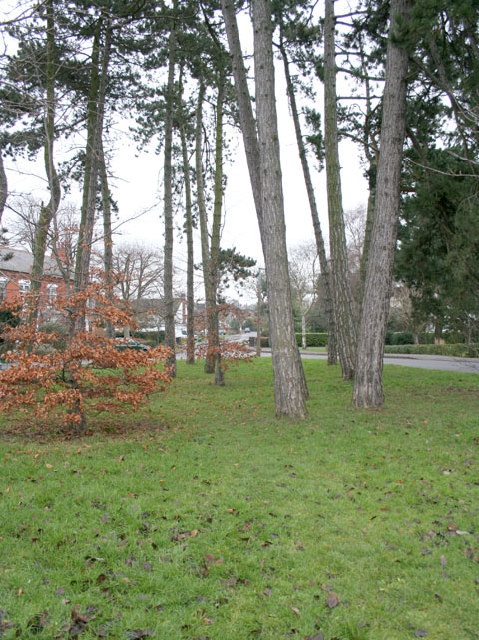
- Bushby village green in January 2006

- Location within Leicestershire
- OS grid reference: SK6504
- Civil parish: Thurnby and Bushby
- District: Harborough
- Shire county: Leicestershire
- Region: East Midlands
- Country: England
- Sovereign state: United Kingdom
- Post town: Leicester
- Postcode district: LE7
- Dialling code: 0116
- Police: Leicestershire
- Fire: Leicestershire
- Ambulance: East Midlands

Bushby is a village and former civil parish, now in the parish of Thurnby and Bushby, in the Harborough district, in Leicestershire, England. In 1931 the parish had a population of 336.

It lies just south of the A47 Uppingham Road, which leads east from Leicester, and contiguous with the village of Thurnby. The principal thoroughfare is the east-west Main Street, off which lead half a dozen closes built since the 1950s. Its central point is the 'spinney', a clump of pine trees forming an island created when a dog's-leg in Main street was straightened out. Most of the settlement is made up of commuter housing, but it retains a handful of farms and shops. Though the local pub, the Rose and Crown, lies in Thurnby, its old skittle alley is on Bushby territory, with the consequence that it used to have later opening hours.

== History ==
The village's name means 'farm/settlement of Butr/Butsi'.

Bushby became a parish in 1866, on 1 April 1935 the parish was abolished and merged with Thurnby.
