= University of Leicester Botanic Garden =

Botanic garden in Oadby, England

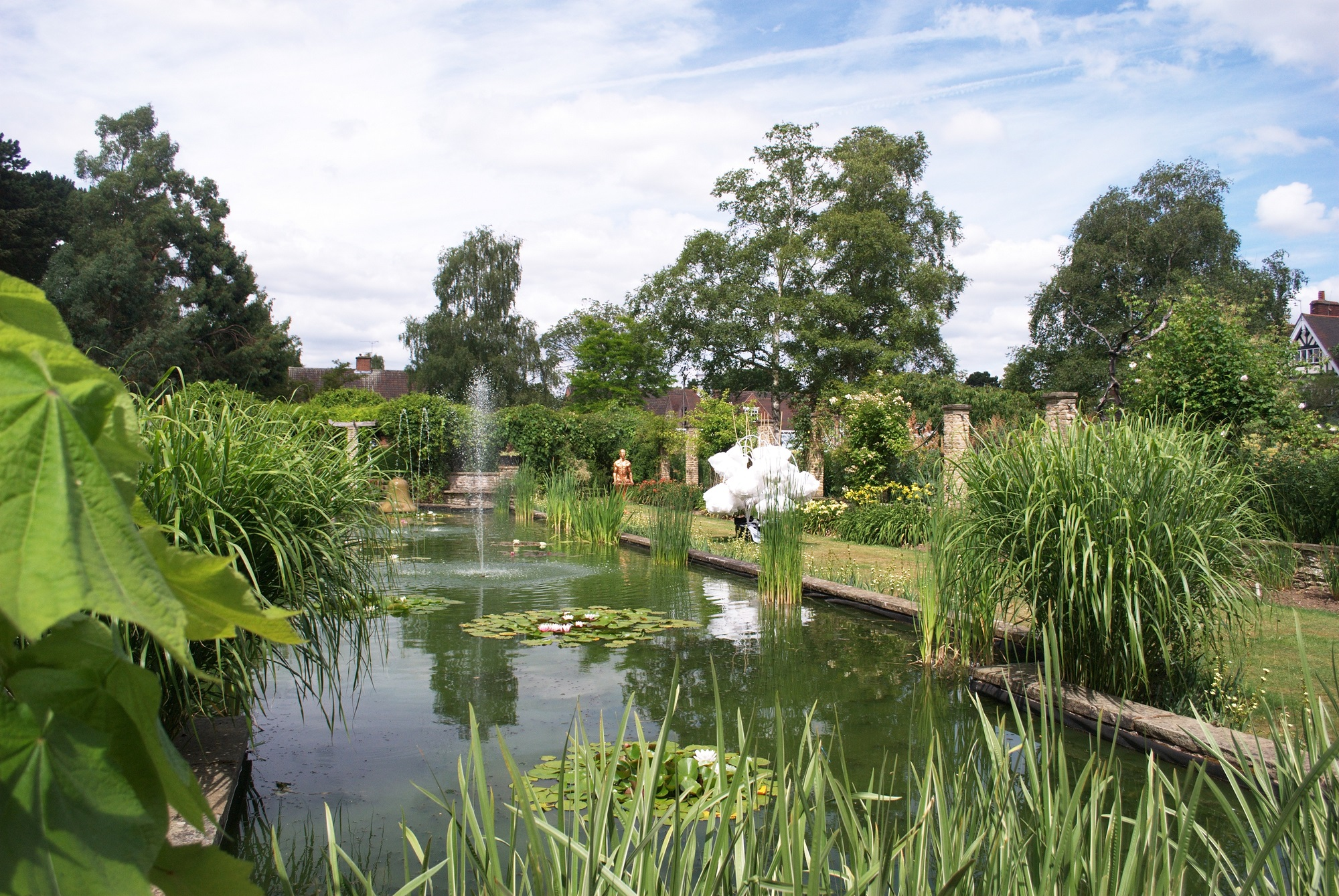
- The pond at the Botanic Garden, showing several of the sculptures installed for the Summer 2010 exhibition

- Location within the East Midlands Location within the United Kingdom Location within Europe
- Type: Botanical garden
- Location: Oadby, Leicestershire, England
- Coordinates: 52.6083°N 1.0913°W
- Area: 16-acre (65,000 m^{2})
- Opened: 1947
- Status: Open year round
- Website: Official website

The University of Leicester Harold Martin Botanic Garden is a botanic garden close to the halls of residence for the University of Leicester in Oadby, Leicestershire, England. Founded in 1921, the garden was established on the present 16-acre (6.5 ha) site in 1947. The garden is used for research and teaching purposes by the university's Genetics (formerly Biology) Department and features events such as sculpture and art exhibitions, music performances and plant sales. It is open to the public. The gardens surround several Edwardian era houses which are now part of Leicester University's halls of residence, including Beaumont House, The Knoll, and Southmeade.

The Attenborough Arboretum is a 5-acre (2.0 ha) satellite in the old village of Knighton (absorbed by Leicester city). It is named after Frederick Attenborough and was opened on 23 April 1997 by his son, Sir David Attenborough. It is managed as a wild site with native trees, ponds and a ridge and furrow field.
