= Queniborough =

Village in Leicestershire, England

Coordinates: 52.70242°N 1.03829°W

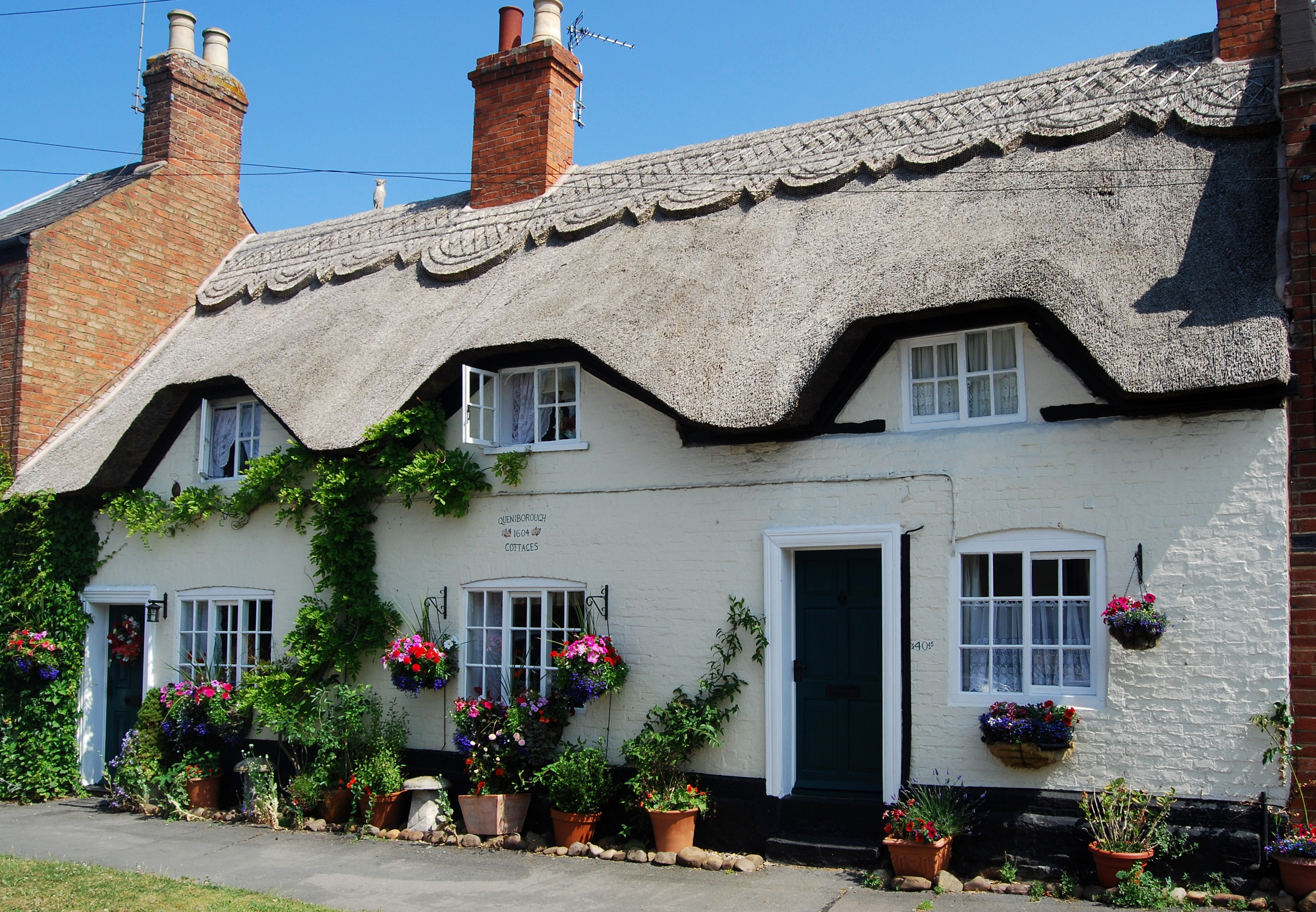
- Thatched Queniborough Cottage dated 1604

- Location within Leicestershire
- Civil parish: Queniborough
- District: Borough of Charnwood
- Shire county: Leicestershire
- Region: East Midlands
- Country: England
- Sovereign state: United Kingdom
- Post town: Leicester
- Postcode district: LE7
- Police: Leicestershire
- Fire: Leicestershire
- Ambulance: East Midlands
- UK Parliament: Melton and Syston

Queniborough is an English village in the county of Leicestershire 1.1 miles (1.8 km) north-east of the town of Syston and of 6.2 miles (10 km) north-east of the city of Leicester. Its 972 properties housed 1,878 registered electors in 2003. The population increased to 2,326 at the 2011 census. It forms part of the Leicester Urban Area due to its proximity. The parish church of St Mary's has, according to the architectural historian Nikolaus Pevsner, "one of the finest spires in the whole of Leicestershire".

== History ==
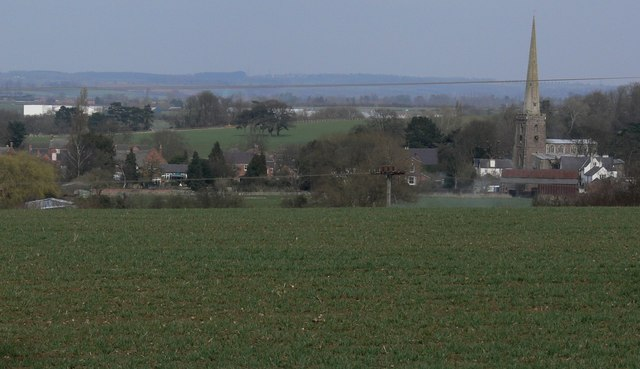
View of Queniborough showing the great height of St Mary's Church spire

The place-name 'Queniborough' first appears in the Domesday Book of 1086, as Cuinburg. It is listed as Quenburg in about 1125, in the Leicestershire Survey in J. H. Round's Feudal England. It appears as Queningburc in 1236 and as Queniburg in 1242 in the Book of Fees. The name is thought to be the Old English Cwēne-burg, meaning "the queen's manor".

The old part of the village, along Main Street, has a mixture of 16th–20th century houses, some of them thatched.

The Grade II*-listed Queniborough Old Hall in Coppice Lane is a large two-storey country house built in 1675–1676 of brick with Swithland slate roofs, to an originally H-shaped plan.

The newer Queniborough Hall in Main Street was built about 1820 with later additions. It has two storeys of stuccoed brick with a four-bay frontage. Until the First World War it was still occupied by the Lord of the Manor, but it has now been converted into flats.

What is now known as Wetherby House was built about 1850 and is believed to have been known as The Beeches. It stands on Syston Road. The house is built of brick with a pitched Swithland slate roof and is listed as of local interest.

There was no school in the village open to ordinary villagers until 1847. The earlier school, in a small building to the rear of No. 28, Main Street, was only for children whose parents worked on the Queniborough Hall estate. Nos 22–28, Main Street were built between 1790 and 1810 as workers' cottages. The schoolmaster lived at No. 28. The row is still occupied, and the old village school, part of No. 28, now serves as a dining room with a 15-foot (4.6 m) vaulted ceiling.

The school built in 1847 stands beside the Horse and Groom pub. This was a free school from the outset, available to children of all villagers. It now holds a small swimming pool for the new primary school built in the 1970s. A junior school was built in Coppice Lane and opened in September 1954.

=== Notable people ===
- George Shingler (1882–1946), county cricketer, died in Queniborough.

== Buildings and facilities ==
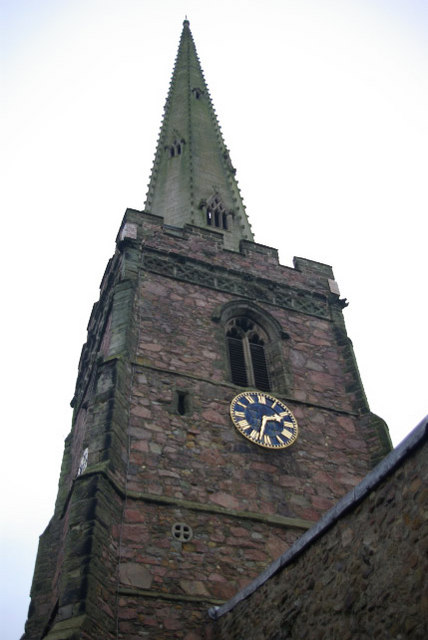
The church's spire

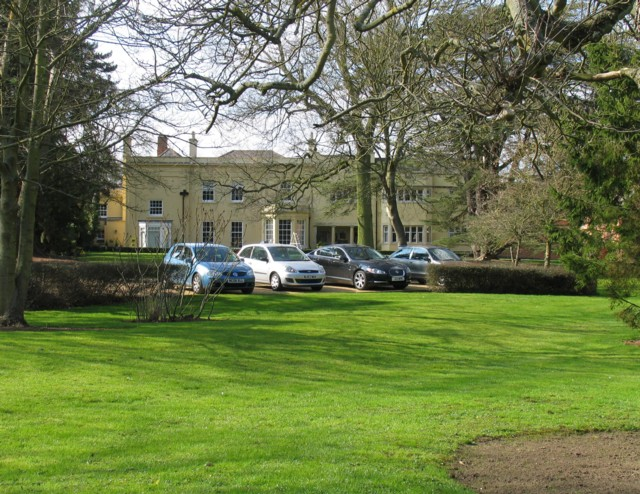
Queniborough Hall

The two public houses, the Horse and Groom, and the Britannia Inn, are both in the centre of the old part of the village. Next door to the Horse and Groom is the Queniborough branch of the British Legion, which has a bar and hall.

The village has a butcher/delicatessen and a ladies' and gents' hairdresser. Properties in the newer part of the village, from Queniborough Road to Syston Road, are all from the 20th century. Here there is a post office and corner shop, and a newsagent and general store. At the same end of the village stands a village hall completed in 1973, used for keep-fit, badminton and other activities, and for a pre-school playgroup. The local Scouts have a hall of their own. The school hall in Coppice Lane is used by Girl Guides, Brownies and Rainbows, and by weight watchers and many other clubs. Winter fairs and other celebrations are also held.

=== Playing fields ===
The village has a sports field marked out mainly for football, for which Queniborough has teams in the junior and senior leagues. The King George playing field is a secure playground for young children, with swings and roundabouts. A recent acquisition is a village tennis court completed in 2005 within the King George playing field.

There is a public footpath to South Croxton that follows Queniborough Brook.
