= 2023 Oadby and Wigston Borough Council election =

2023 local election in England

- 4 May 2023

All 26 seats to Oadby and Wigston 14 seats needed for a majority

	First party	Second party
Leader	Samia Haq	Priti Joshi
Party	Liberal Democrats	Conservative
Last election	24 seats, 66.7%	2 seats, 25.0%
Seats before	22	4
Seats after	19	7
Seat change	▼5	▲5
Popular vote	18,320	15,909
Percentage	51.1%	44.4%
Swing	▼15.6%	▲19.4%
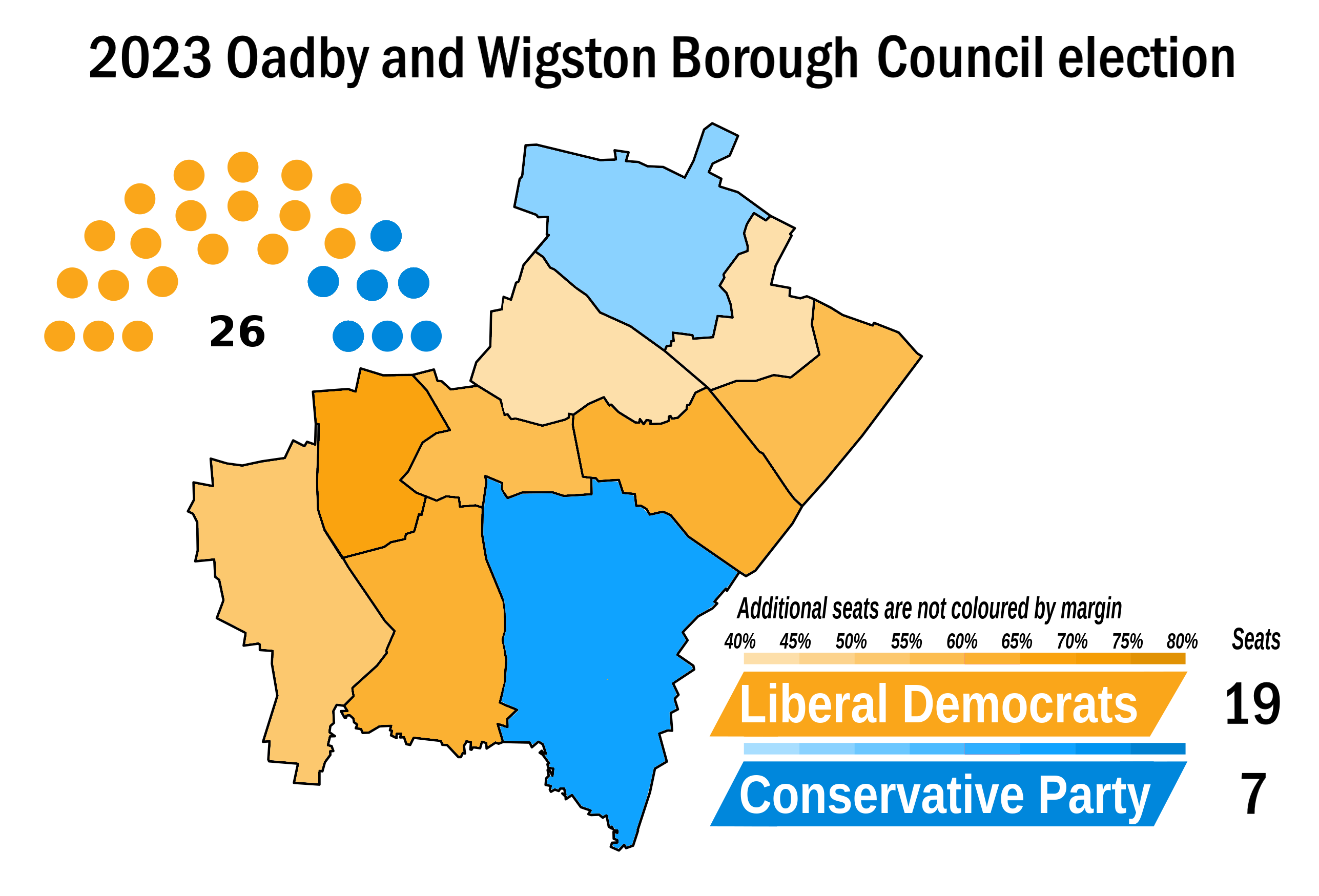
- Map of the results of the election by ward
Leader before election
Samia Haq
Liberal Democrats
Leader after election
Samia Haq
Liberal Democrats

The 2023 Oadby and Wigston Borough Council election was held on 4 May 2023 to elect all 28 members of Oadby and Wigston Borough Council in Leicestershire, England. This was on the same day as other local elections across England.

All wards were up for election, each with 2 or 3 councillors to be elected. The Liberal Democrats were defending control of the council, having won 24 of 26 seats at the previous election. The previous leader of the council, John Boyce, stood down as leader two weeks before the election, having decided not to stand for re-election. He had been in the post for 17 years. He was replaced by Samia Haq.

The Liberal Democrats retained their majority at the election.

== Results summary ==
Oadby and Wigston Borough Council election, 2023
Party	Candidates						Votes		
Party	Stood	Elected	Gained	Unseated	Net	% of total	%	No.	Net %
Liberal Democrats	26	19	0	5	▼5	73.1%	51.1%	18,320	▼16%
Conservative	26	7	5	0	▲5	26.9%	44.4%	15,909	▲19.6%
Labour	5	0	0	0	Steady	0%	4.4%	1,605	▼3.2%

== Ward results ==
Ward boundaries

Sitting councillors are marked with an asterisk (*).

=== Oadby Brocks Hill ===
Oadby Brocks Hill (2 seats)
Party	Candidate	Votes	%	±%
Liberal Democrats	Jeffrey Kaufman*	792	58.4	−17.0
Liberal Democrats	Mohammed Latif Darr*	736	54.2	−16.7
Conservative	Rakesh Chander	531	39.1	+14.3
Conservative	Mohammad Alam	471	34.7	+17.9
Turnout		1,357	42.70	▼
Registered electors		3,178		
Liberal Democrats hold		Swing	▼	
Liberal Democrats hold		Swing		

These figures are updated. On 15 May 2023 the council announced that the Returning Officer had identified an administrative error in the results published on 5 May for the Oadby Brocks Hill ward. The originally published figures were: Kaufman 342, Darr 286, Chandar 231, Alam 171.

=== Oadby Grange ===
Oadby Grange (3 seats)
Party	Candidate	Votes	%	±%
Conservative	Naveed Alam*	757	47.6	+0.8
Conservative	Kamal Ghattoraya*	673	42.3	−7.7
Conservative	Priti Joshi*	672	42.2	−10.0
Liberal Democrats	Moin Durrani	651	40.9	−5.8
Liberal Democrats	Jaspal Singh Kang	636	39.9	−6.7
Liberal Democrats	Richard Bartfield	565	35.5	−5.7
Labour	Nigel Smith	269	16.9	New
Turnout		1,592	40.97	▲5.4
Registered electors		3,886		
Conservative gain from Liberal Democrats		Swing	▲0.8	
Conservative hold		Swing		
Conservative hold		Swing		

=== Oadby St Peter's ===
Oadby St Peter's (2 seats)
Party	Candidate	Votes	%	±%
Liberal Democrats	Ian Ridley*	525	41.4	−4.0
Liberal Democrats	Jasvir Kaur Chohan	491	38.7	−8.8
Conservative	Aman Singh Thind	488	38.5	+12.5
Conservative	Marcus Solanki	479	37.8	+10.4
Labour	Rumman Ahmed	226	17.8	−5.7
Labour	John Britten	226	17.8	−4.6
Majority		34	2.7	
Liberal Democrats hold		Swing	▼9.3	
Liberal Democrats hold		Swing		
Turnout		1,268	37.84	
Registered electors		3,351		

=== Oadby Uplands ===
Oadby Uplands (2 seats)
Party	Candidate	Votes	%	±%
Liberal Democrats	Samia Haq*	616	38.5	−2.4
Conservative	Rupa Joshi	545	34.0	+3.3
Liberal Democrats	Victor Kaufman	530	33.1	−5.2
Conservative	Mohammed Boodhoo	529	33.0	+5.0
Labour	Hajira Piranie	457	28.5	+0.4
Labour	Justine Mercer	427	26.7	+0.9
Turnout		1,601	48.37	
Registered electors		3,310		
Liberal Democrats hold		Swing	▼4.2	
Conservative gain from Liberal Democrats		Swing		

=== Oadby Woodlands ===
Oadby Woodlands (2 seats)
Party	Candidate	Votes	%	±%
Liberal Democrats	Dean Gamble*	707	53.6	+1.7
Liberal Democrats	Santokh Singh Athwal	680	51.6	+5.7
Conservative	Dilip Dave	556	42.2	+6.1
Conservative	Harrinder Singh Rai	532	40.4	+13.4
Turnout		1,318	39.25	
Registered electors		3,358		
Liberal Democrats hold		Swing	▲3.5	
Liberal Democrats hold		Swing		

=== South Wigston ===
South Wigston (3 seats)
Party	Candidate	Votes	%	±%
Liberal Democrats	Rosemarie Adams*	685	49.5	−4.9
Liberal Democrats	Carl Walter	645	46.6	−4.1
Liberal Democrats	Richard Morris*	619	44.7	−3.0
Conservative	Yvonne Darling	601	43.4	+19.7
Conservative	Karen Stokes	580	41.9	+18.9
Conservative	Tony Stokes	561	40.5	+18.6
Turnout		1,385	22.81	
Registered electors		6,072		
Liberal Democrats hold		Swing	▼12.1	
Liberal Democrats hold		Swing		
Liberal Democrats hold		Swing		

=== Wigston All Saints ===
Wigston All Saints (3 seats)
Party	Candidate	Votes	%	±%
Liberal Democrats	Michael Charlesworth*	916	60.7	−11.8
Liberal Democrats	Lee Bentley*	905	60.0	−15.3
Liberal Democrats	Gary Hunt	863	57.2	−16.5
Conservative	Michael McGee	515	34.1	+13.7
Conservative	Claire Wills	503	33.3	N/A
Conservative	Julian Tibbets	481	31.9	N/A
Turnout		1,509	32.24	
Registered electors		4,681		
Liberal Democrats hold		Swing	▼27.3	
Liberal Democrats hold		Swing		
Liberal Democrats hold		Swing		

=== Wigston Fields ===
Wigston Fields (3 seats)
Party	Candidate	Votes	%	±%
Liberal Democrats	Bill Boulter*	910	63.2	−13.1
Liberal Democrats	Kevin Loydall*	888	61.7	−11.0
Liberal Democrats	Carl Martin	830	57.7	−19.7
Conservative	Nick Agar	478	33.2	+11.9
Conservative	Mirza Junak	396	27.5	N/A
Conservative	Shantilal Nandha	388	27.0	N/A
Turnout		1,439	28.23	
Registered electors		5,098		
Liberal Democrats hold		Swing	▼23.7	
Liberal Democrats hold		Swing		
Liberal Democrats hold		Swing		

=== Wigston Meadowcourt ===
Wigston Meadowcourt (3 seats)
Party	Candidate	Votes	%	±%
Conservative	Liz Darling	1,117	64.8	+29.2
Conservative	Colin Gore	1,091	63.3	+31.1
Conservative	John Ford	1,080	62.6	+34.9
Liberal Democrats	Michael Phipps	531	30.8	−21.8
Liberal Democrats	David Loydall*	520	30.2	−24.5
Liberal Democrats	Michael White	479	27.8	−24.2
Turnout		1,724	32.58	
Registered electors		5,291		
Conservative gain from Liberal Democrats		Swing	▲29.7	
Conservative gain from Liberal Democrats		Swing		
Conservative gain from Liberal Democrats		Swing		

=== Wigston St Wolstan's ===
Wigston St Wolstan's (3 seats)
Party	Candidate	Votes	%	±%
Liberal Democrats	Linda Broadley*	888	54.4	−24.5
Liberal Democrats	Frank Broadley*	876	53.6	−25.3
Liberal Democrats	Clare Koslowski*	836	51.2	−21.0
Conservative	Alex Darling	637	39.0	N/A
Conservative	Mukesh Dave	630	38.6	+16.6
Conservative	Matthew Ford	618	37.8	N/A
Turnout		1,633	32.78	
Registered electors		4,981		
Liberal Democrats hold		Swing	▼33.2	
Liberal Democrats hold		Swing		
Liberal Democrats hold		Swing		

== Changes 2023–2027 ==
- Michael Charlesworth, elected as a Liberal Democrat, left the party in March 2024 to sit as an independent.
- Frank Broadley and Linda Broadley, both elected as Liberal Democrats, left the party in May 2025 to sit as independents.
- Priti Joshi and Rupa Joshi, both elected as Conservatives, left the party in September 2025 to sit as independents.
