= Thurnby and Bushby =

Civil parish in Leicestershire, England

Coordinates: 52.63°N 01.04°W

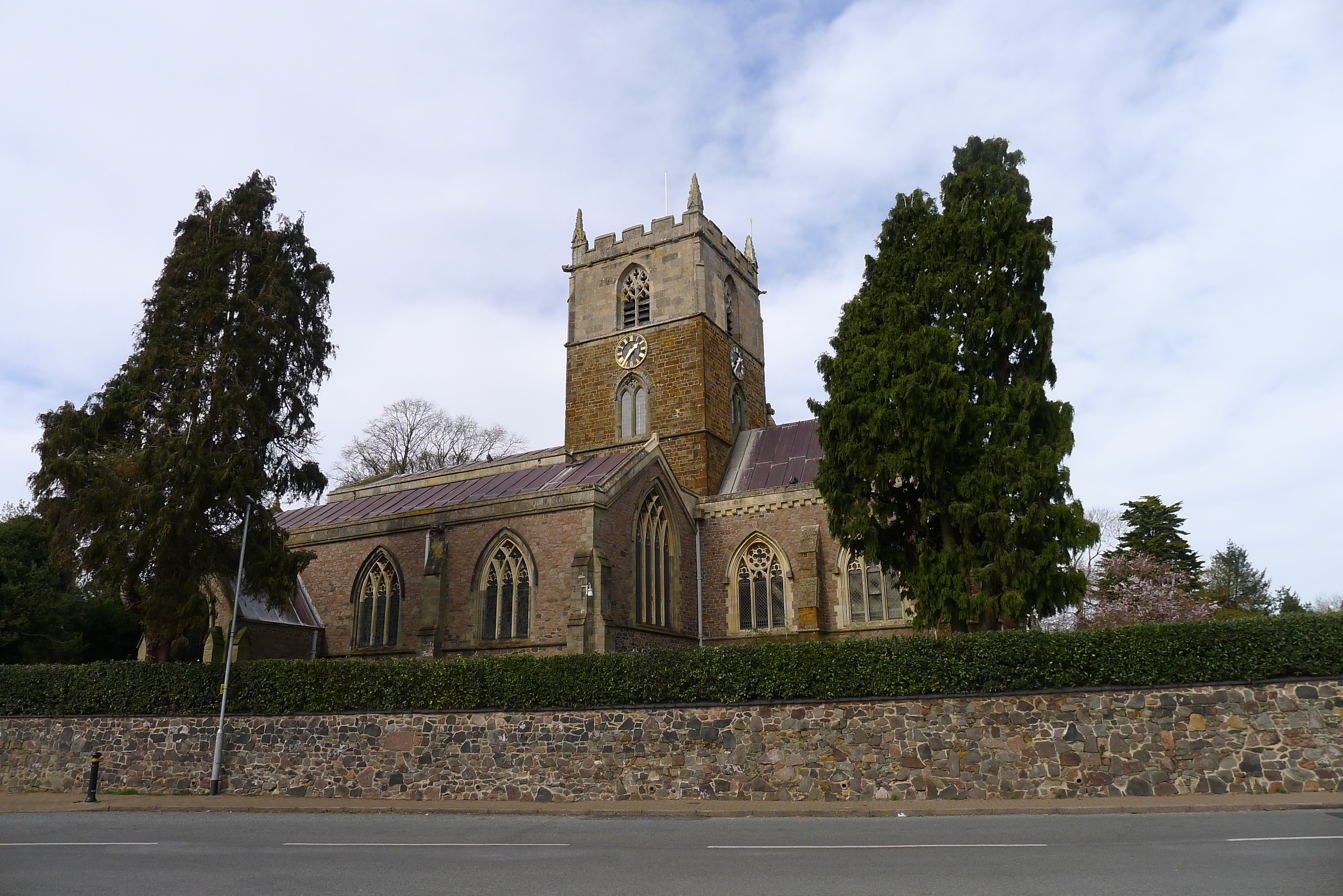
- Church of St Luke, Thurnby

- Location within Leicestershire
- Population: 3,301 (2011)
- OS grid reference: SK6504
- District: Harborough
- Shire county: Leicestershire
- Region: East Midlands
- Country: England
- Sovereign state: United Kingdom
- Post town: Leicester
- Postcode district: LE7
- Police: Leicestershire
- Fire: Leicestershire
- Ambulance: East Midlands

Thurnby and Bushby, sometimes known as Thurnby, is a civil parish in the Harborough district of Leicestershire, England.

According to the 2001 census it had a population of 3,147, increasing to 3,301 at the 2011 census.

== Position ==
It forms part of the Leicester Urban Area, and is on the A47 road, just east of the city area of Evington.

It constitutes Thurnby and Bushby, which have formed a single civil parish since 1935.

== Conveniences ==
- Thurnby and Bushby has a primary school - St Lukes C of E primary school, which has strong links with St. Lukes Church.
- There is a public house - The Rose and Crown.
- Thurnby Scouts and Guides are situated on Court Road.
