= Gartree Hundred =

Historical division of Leicestershire, England

Coordinates: 52.5°N 0.9°W

Gartree was a hundred of Leicestershire.

It was in the south-east of the county, roughly corresponding to today's Harborough district. The town of Market Harborough was its largest settlement. It gives its name to HMP Gartree, Gartree High School and also to the Gartree electoral division of Leicestershire.

The original meeting place of the hundred, which was used for local administration, justice and taxation, was the Gartree Bush, or Gartree (possibly from the Scandinavian word geir or spear), lying north east of Kibworth and south west of Gaulby on the Roman Via Devana, now known as the Gartree Road. This was the open-air meeting place from the tenth century to the eighteenth century where jurors, drawn from the local villages, handed out justice and administered taxes each month. It may have been the site of a prehistoric burial mound, and the site of a previous Anglo Saxon moot place. In 1750, this was moved to the Bull's Head at Tur Langton.
