= Dave Hawker =

English footballer

Personal information
- Full name: David Hawker
- Date of birth: 29 November 1958 (age 67)
- Place of birth: Hull, England
- Position: Midfielder

Youth career
- Hull City

Senior career*
Years	Team	Apps	(Gls)
1976–1980	Hull City	35	(2)
1980–1983	Darlington	88	(2)
1983–1984	Bishop Auckland		
1984–1985	Darlington	7	(0)
1985–1986	Brandon United		
1986–1989	Whitley Bay		
1989–19??	South Bank		
- * Club domestic league appearances and goals

David Hawker (born 29 November 1958) is an English former footballer who made 130 appearances in the Football League playing for Hull City and Darlington in the 1970s and 1980s. A midfielder, he also played non-league football for clubs including Bishop Auckland, Brandon United, Whitley Bay, for whom he scored as Bay won the 1986–87 Northumberland Senior Cup final, and South Bank.
