= James Hawker (poacher) =

English poacher (1836–1921)

James Hawker (baptised 29 August 1836 – 7 August 1921) was an English poacher.

He was born in Daventry, Northamptonshire and began poaching as a teenager to gain extra income whilst working as an apprentice bootmaker. He joined the militia to acquire a gun and reached the rank of corporal, although he left Daventry after falling out with the head gamekeeper at Badby.

In 1893, he was elected to the Oadby school-board (sitting next to the "Leading Gentlemen" on whose lands he poached) and in 1894 was a member of the Oadby parish council. Hawker kept photographs of William Ewart Gladstone, Charles Bradlaugh, Augustine Birrell, Thomas Sayers, and Gladys Cooper in his diary. In 1921 he died of a heart attack at Stoughton Road, Oadby, and was buried in Oadby cemetery. Descendants of James Hawker are also buried there.

In 1961, the Oxford University Press published his journal, written in 1904–1905, a "mixture of autobiography, poacher's handbook, and radical philosophy". A play of Hawker's life, The Poacher, was produced by the Emma Theatre Company in 1980 and written by Andrew Marley and Lloyd Johnston. After the first performance of the play, a collection was raised which paid for a headstone at Hawker's grave, bearing the motto: "I will Poach till I die".

In 1982, David Sneath and Barry Lount published a book on James Hawker titled The Life of a Victorian Poacher. David Sneath is a direct descendant of James Hawker who has also lived on Stoughton Road and was part of the Oadby Historical Society.
