= James Hawker (British Army officer) =

British Royal Artillery officer

Colonel James Hawker, C.B. (c. 1773 – 12 October 1827) was a British Royal Artillery officer during the Napoleonic Wars.

== Biography ==
Hawker was appointed first lieutenant in the Royal Artillery (R.A.) in 1794, captain lieutenant in 1799, captain in 1803, brevet major in 1811, lieutenant colonel R.A. 1815, and colonel in 1825. He was a Companion of the Bath.

Hawker served in the Peninsular War in Spain and Portugal, and was present at the battle of Albuhera for which he received a medal. In 1815 served at the Battle of Waterloo. and the storming of Cambrai during the advance on Paris. Afterwards he was commander of the Royal Artillery in the Plymouth district, and was Lieutenant Governor of Gravesend and Tilbury. He died in October 1827 at Woolwich (then in Kent and now in London).
