= Hawker Creek =

Stream in the U.S. state of Missouri

Coordinates: 37°07′59″N 89°57′45″W

Hawker Creek is a stream in Bollinger County in the U.S. state of Missouri. It was a tributary to the Castor River, but now flows into the Headwater Diversion Channel.

Hawker Creek thas the name of a pioneer who settled near it.

== See also ==
- List of rivers of Missouri
