= Beauchamp College =

The Beauchamp College

Location
- Ridge Way; Oadby, Leicestershire, LE2 5TP; England; 52°35′17″N 1°04′21″W

Information
- Type: Academy
- Established: 14th century or earlier (1964 current site)
- Trust: Lionheart Academies Trust
- Department for Education URN: 139624 Tables
- Ofsted: Reports
- Chair of Governors: Chris Swan
- Associate Principal: Sally Wicken
- Executive Headteacher: Kath Kelly
- Staff: 400 (approx.)
- Gender: Coeducational
- Age: 11 to 19
- Enrolment: 2283
- Website: http://www.beauchamp.org.uk

Beauchamp College (/ˈbiːtʃəm/ BEE-chəm) is a coeducational secondary school and further education community college, in Oadby, a town on the outskirts of Leicester, England. It is situated on the southern edge of the built-up area of Oadby on the same campus as Gartree High School and Brocks Hill Primary School.

It is the only Oadby school to offer a pathway of 11–19, with students joining in Year 7 and progressing through to GCSE and then Level 3 courses at KS5. It was rated top state secondary in the Leicester Mercury Real Schools Guide in 2017. However, now it has dropped in ranking as well as Ofsted ranking from previously being “Outstanding” to “Good”.

== History ==
=== Grammar school ===
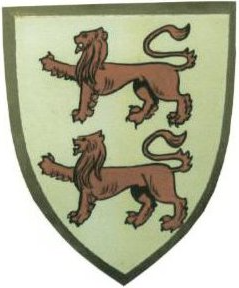
KBGS logo

The school dates back to the mid-15th century and over time took the name of Kibworth Beauchamp Grammar School (KBGS), located in the village of the same name. It was founded by Francis Edwards who owned the manor of Welham and whose daughter was the richest woman in England. The history of that school has recorded by Bernard Elliott. In 1964 'KBGS' became the Beauchamp Grammar School when it moved from School Lane, Kibworth, into new buildings in Oadby, a rapidly growing residential suburban area to the South of Leicester, about 5 miles (8.0 km) from the City of Leicester.

=== Comprehensive ===
Beauchamp subsequently became a comprehensive Upper School for pupils aged 14 to 18, although the last pupils to have gained entry via the 11-plus examination did not leave until 1968. It then became fully comprehensive, serving Oadby as its main catchment area, as well as drawing from villages up to 8 miles (13 km) away.

=== Academy ===
The school converted to academy status on 1 May 2013.

Beauchamp College is the largest school in the Lionheart Academies Trust. The school was named in July 2019 as a computing hub for the National Centre for Computing Education.

== Community college ==
Beauchamp is also a Community College, with over 2,500 part-time students taking part in a variety of recreational, cultural and academic evening classes. Many extra curricular activities are also held on a weekly basis such as Young Enterprise, Drama and sports clubs, (primarily Tennis and Football).

== Funding ==
On 1 April 1996, Beauchamp gained the status of Technology College. It received sponsorship of over £122,000 from The Garfield Weston Foundation, Lloyds Bank, Alliance & Leicester, Midland Bank, Psion, and Sainsbury's. The college also receives a maintenance grant of around £220,000 from the DCSF. This additional funding has allowed for a number of refurbishments and new buildings at the College including a design facility, that includes an exhibition centre. Other recently completed projects include an Adult Learning Centre which provides rooms and conference rooms for hire; and an Applied Learning Centre which includes a performing arts studio and dance studio (all for vocational courses), as well as space for quiet study.

== Sports centre ==
The sports centre was completed in 2006.

== Publications ==
- A History of Kibworth Beauchamp Grammar School by Bernard Elliott

== Notable former pupils ==
- Jassa Ahluwalia – actor and presenter
- John Deacon (1965–1969) – Queen bassist
- Amanda Drew – actress
- Wes Harding – Birmingham City footballer
- John Merricks – racing sailor; won silver medal at Atlanta Olympics in 1996 as helm in 470 class (c 1985–1989)
- Lathaniel Rowe-Turner – Leicester City F.C. and Torquay United player
- David Shrigley – visual artist
- Fagun Thakrar – actress and designer
- Luke Thomas - Leicester City footballer
- Amy Voce – Gem 106 presenter

=== Kibworth Beauchamp Grammar School ===
- Frank Dunlop – theatre director (1928–35)
- Bill Maynard (1940–45) – British comedian and actor, and former presenter on Radio Leicester
- Peter Wilby – former editor of the New Statesman (1998–2005) and (1995–6) of The Independent on Sunday (attended 1956–63)

== See also ==
- List of the oldest schools in the United Kingdom
