= Gartree High School =

Location
- Ridgeway; Oadby, Leicestershire, LE2 5TQ; England; 52°35′15″N 1°04′30″W

Information
- Type: Academy
- Department for Education URN: 138155 Tables
- Ofsted: Reports
- Chair of Governors: Adrian Peryer
- Co-head teachers: Will Carter; Ed Wilson
- Staff: c. 70
- Gender: Coeducational
- Age: 11 to 16
- Enrolment: c.500
- Houses: Arctic, Atlantic, Caspian & Pacific
- Website: gartree.leics.sch.uk

Gartree High School is a coeducational secondary school with academy status. Its age-range designation is 11–16. GCSEs have been taught since 2017 and its first GCSE results published in 2019. The school is situated in Oadby, a town on the south side of Leicester, England.

== Age-range change ==
Gartree High School is an 11–16 school serving a catchment area in Oadby, Leicestershire, and surrounding villages. From 2017 students will join the school in Year 7 and leave in Year 11, following the pattern common across most of the country.

== Hearing-impaired unit ==
Gartree High School used to host Leicestershire's Schools Hearing Impaired Unit. The Hearing Impaired Unit has since moved to a purpose built facility which is situated on the neighboring Beauchamp College site.

== Origins and history ==
In 1707-15 there was apparently no school in Oadby, according to Bishop Wake's visitation questionnaire. An 1818 parliamentary enquiry recorded that the only means of education for poorer families in Oadby was a Sunday School connected to St Peter's Church, attended by 117 children. In 1838 the parish received funds to establish an infants' school and a daily school. In 1872 a school board was set up to provide additional school places, and a school in the Baptist church's schoolroom was opened in 1872. It became a council school after school boards were abolished by the Education Act 1902. A new council school for older children was opened in 1929. Following the Education Act 1944 the council school became a secondary school and was officially named Gartree Modern School in 1948. A punishment book from the County School which started in April 1945 was continued at Gartree Modern, survived the move to the new site in 1960 and was used until 1983 (first entry: "Persistent Disobedience," 12.4.45; final entry: "Disruptive behaviour in class," 9.2.83).

Gartree High School opened on its current site in October 1960. The opening was conducted by Professor C A Coulson, professor of mathematics from Oxford University. The building was originally planned to hold 450 pupils but was expanded to accommodate 600 children. The school provided "a complete range of secondary courses during the compulsory stage for children from Oadby, Burton Overy, Great Glen, Houghton-on-the-Hill, Hungerton, Keyham, Newton Harcourt, Scraptoft, Stoughton, Great and Little Stretton and Thurnby." After three years pupils had the option to transfer to Guthlaxton Grammar School in Wigston.

The Leicestershire Plan of the late 1950s saw a new vision for secondary education in Leicestershire. The then Secretary of State for Education, Edward Short, described the plan as making the county "an impressive name in the field of education". According to Stewart Mason (Director of Education for Leicestershire until 1971) "the 11-plus examination and the resultant segregation of children into grammar and secondary modern schools is an offence against reason and public conscience." The plan he devised, and which was put into effect across the county, meant the abolition of 11-plus segregation; and at the age of fourteen there could be transfer to grammar schools without examination for children whose parents choose it for them and promised to keep them there beyond sixteen.

In 1968, eleven years after the introduction of the Leicestershire Plan, Gartree became a high school, Manor High School, Oadby was created as a school for children aged 10-14, and the younger children from Gartree were transferred there.

In 1973 the age of transfer to secondary school in Oadby was lowered to 10 and Brookside Primary opened on adjoining land, allowing children to remain in the same locality from 4–18.

== House System ==
A house system was introduced in September 2014. Each student is placed into one of the following houses, named after seas and oceans:

- Arctic (Green)
- Atlantic (Yellow)
- Pacific (Red)
- Caspian (Blue)

This is not the first house system employed in the school. Under an earlier scheme, the school was also divided into four houses, all named after famous people connected with the Leicester area:

- Wolsey (Red), after Cardinal Wolsey, Lord Chancellor of England who died in Leicester Abbey, 1530.
- Wycliffe (Green), after John Wycliffe, theologian and Bible-translator, who was rector of Lutterworth in Leicestershire.
- de Montfort (Blue), after Simon de Montfort, 6th Earl of Leicester and de facto ruler of England during the Second Barons' War.
- Carey (Yellow), after William Carey, missionary and social reformer, who was pastor of Harvey Lane Baptist Church, Leicester between 1782 and 1793.

Pupils were required to wear sports gear of their house colour, as well as coloured pin badges on their uniforms. Good work was rewarded with "merit" certificates which could be exchanged for "house points". (House points could also be forfeited for bad behaviour.) This system was abolished after the summer of 1977, though the house colours persisted on the sports fields until around 1979.

== New school rebuild ==
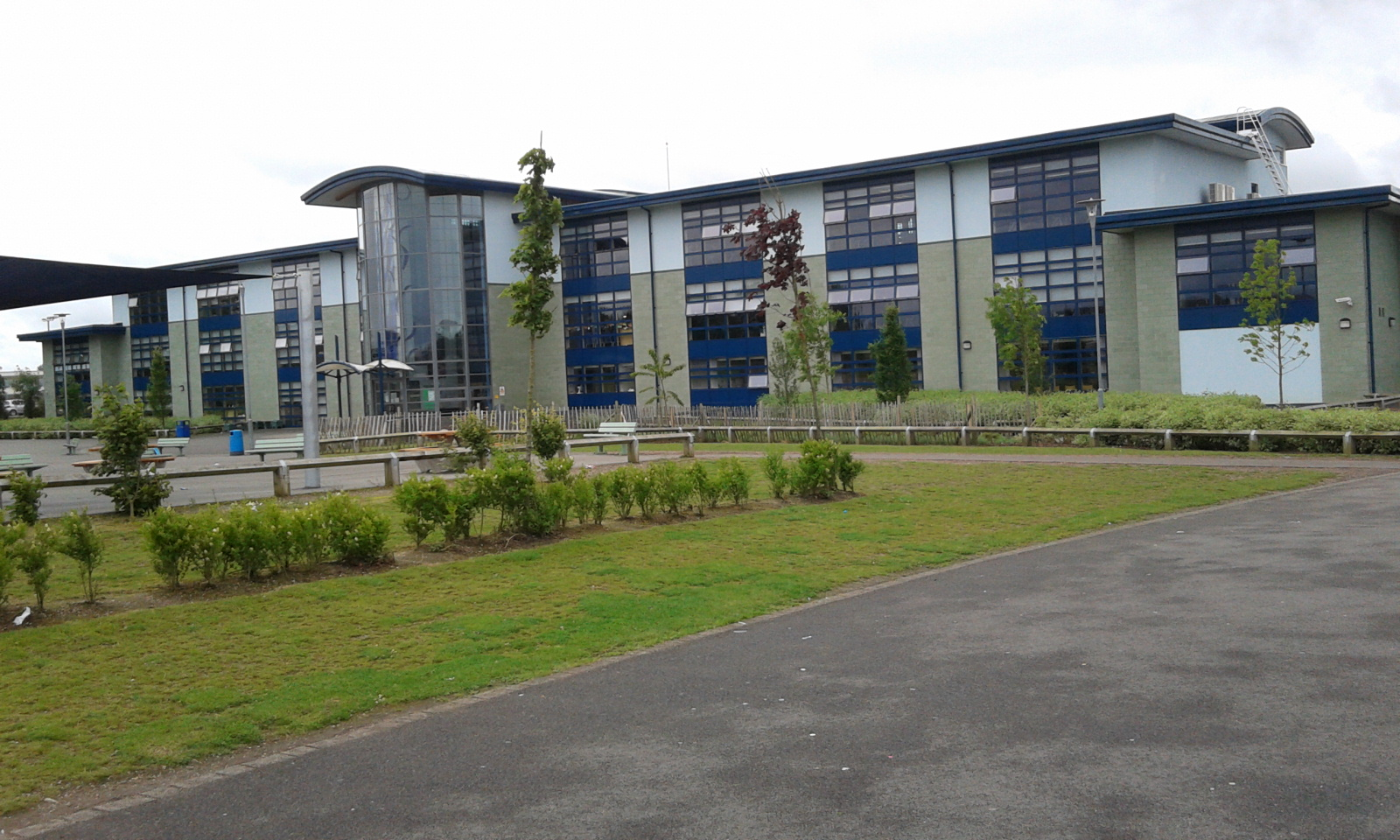
Gartree High School

The 1960s two-storey building was replaced in 2007. The new building is on the same campus. The current building was being built behind the previous building. The 1960s construction was at the front of the current campus, which explains the humps on the front field, which were formed during the building work. As of 2019 there are no remains of the 1960s building left – all other counterparts have since been demolished. The only other building is on Beauchamp College with a small building left. The initial cost of the new building was estimated at £12 million. It opened to students in early July 2007.

== Notable former pupils ==
- John Deacon, musician, member of the band Queen.
