= Oadby =

Town in Leicestershire, England

Coordinates: 52.5987°N 1.0763°W

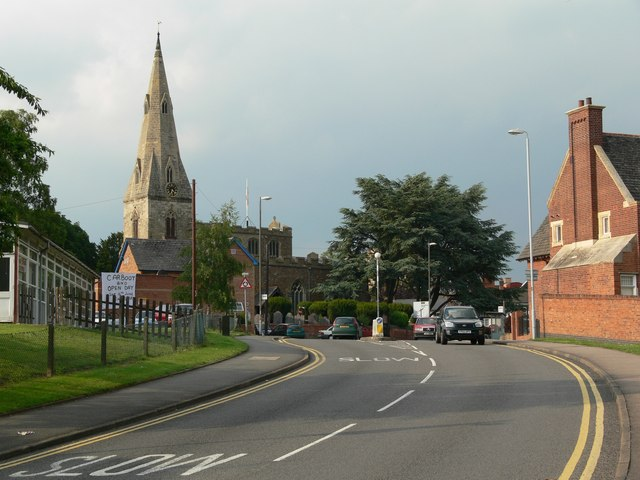
- Oadby Town

- Location within Leicestershire
- Population: 23,849
- OS grid reference: SK625005
- District: Oadby and Wigston
- Shire county: Leicestershire
- Region: East Midlands
- Country: England
- Sovereign state: United Kingdom
- Post town: LEICESTER
- Postcode district: LE2
- Dialling code: 0116
- Police: Leicestershire
- Fire: Leicestershire
- Ambulance: East Midlands
- UK Parliament: Harborough, Oadby and Wigston

Oadby is a town in the borough of Oadby and Wigston in Leicestershire, England, located 4 miles (6.4 km) south-east of Leicester on the A6 road. Leicester Racecourse is situated on the border between Oadby and Stoneygate. The University of Leicester Botanical Garden is in Oadby. Oadby had a population of 23,849 in 2011, and like its neighbour Wigston is made up of five wards. The Borough of Oadby and Wigston is twinned with Maromme in France, and Norderstedt in Germany.

== History ==
=== Angles, Danes and Normans ===
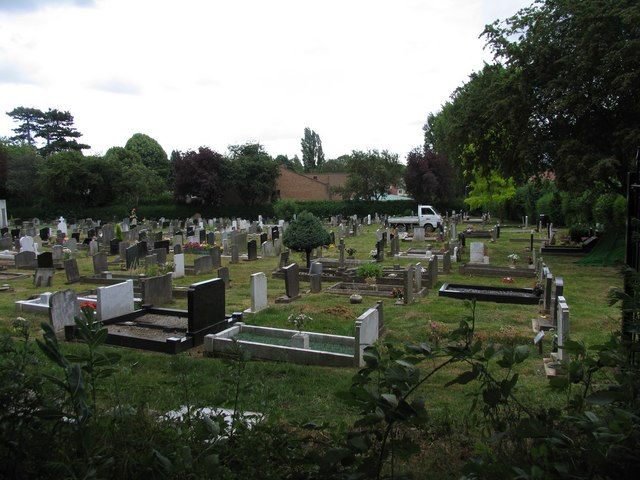
The cemetery

There has been a habitation in Oadby since an Anglian settlement in the early Anglo-Saxon period. Though the name Oadby is Danish (meaning "Outi's dwelling") it must have existed long before the Danish invasions as is shown by the existence of a pagan Anglian cemetery. The original Anglian name has been lost. In 1760, on Brocks Hill, evidence of an Anglian burial ground was discovered. The Middle Angles came under the rule of the kings of Mercia and were later conquered by the Danish invaders. Oadby is one of seventy Danish settlements in Leicestershire ending with "-by", which means village or settlement. Its name probably came from Old Norse Auðarbýr = "Auði's settlement". Danish rule continued until 920, when King Alfred the Great won his battles against the Danes: the Oadby area is supposed to be the site of at least one of these battles.

In the Domesday Book, 1086, Oadby's name was recorded as Oldebi. Other early forms are Oladebi, Outheby (Feet of Fines, 1199), Onderby and, finally, Oadby. When King Harold had been defeated, William the Conqueror gave Oadby to Hugh de Grandmesnil, Governor of Leicestershire, who founded the parish church of Oadby on the site of the present St Peter's Church. The tenants of the manor of Oadby were Roger who held one and half carucates, and Countess Judith who held 9 carucates and 2 bovates, and 30 acres of meadow. On the Countess's land were 46 socmen, eleven bordars and three serfs; two carucates were let to Robert de Buci. The manor was held in 1444 by William Ferrers; in 1457 it was held by William Grey, Lord Ferrers of Groby. In 1541 the manor was held by John Waldron; his successor John Waldron sold it in 1629 to Sir John Lombe. In 1831 the main landed proprietors were the trustees of the late George Wyndham (patrons of the vicarage), George Legh Keck (lord of the manor) and Thomas Pares.

=== Late 19th Century ===
Oadby remained a small settlement until the late 19th century when it became a fashionable suburb for the businessmen of Leicester, such as the factory owners of Leicester's shoe and stocking manufacturers. Many substantial houses were built in Oadby, some of which are now used by the University of Leicester.

Stoughton Road in Oadby contains two sets of houses of historical interest. Some of the Framework Knitters Homes date back to 1909, while the North Memorial Homes, financed by Sir Jonathan North (former Mayor of Leicester), were built in 1927 and opened in the same year by the Prince of Wales. As well as a series of houses, the North Memorial Homes site also houses the North Memorial Hall, built in a neo-Georgian style, which has been leased to Oadby Evangelical Free Church since 1974.

In the late 19th century Oadby town centre was focused along Leicester Road, The Parade and London Road. The oldest properties and locations can be found at the Wigston Road, London Road junction through to the Glen Road (A6) junction. Some of the 19th century buildings that remain are the cottages and shops (including Wilson B Ragg Butchers & Gingerbread Cottage bakers) along London Road through to Glen Road.

=== Modern times ===
Expansion of Oadby took place rapidly in the 20th century and was still continuing in 2017. Many residential developments have been constructed, and the population in 2011 reached 23,849.

In the early 20th century, the Travellers Rest (located near to the London Road Glen Road junction) was torn down in 1939 and replaced by The Oadby Owl on a neighbouring site. Both inns were run by Walter Cufflin (a descendant of James Hawker).

== Oadby today ==
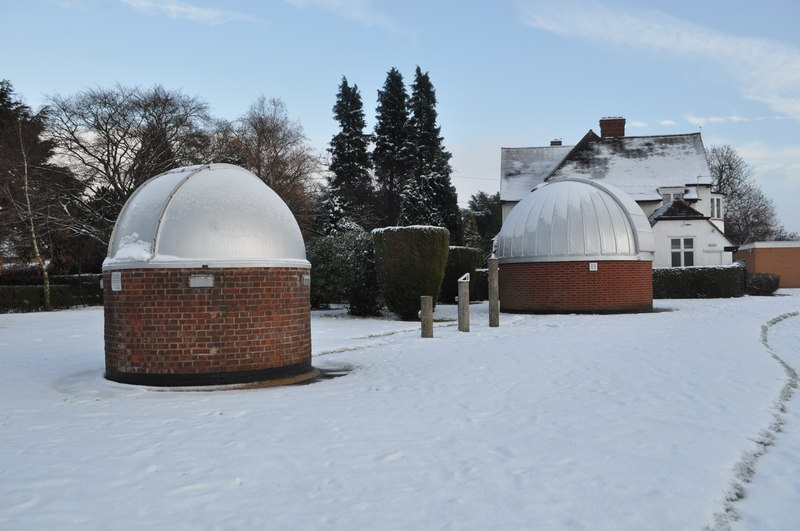
Oadby Observatory

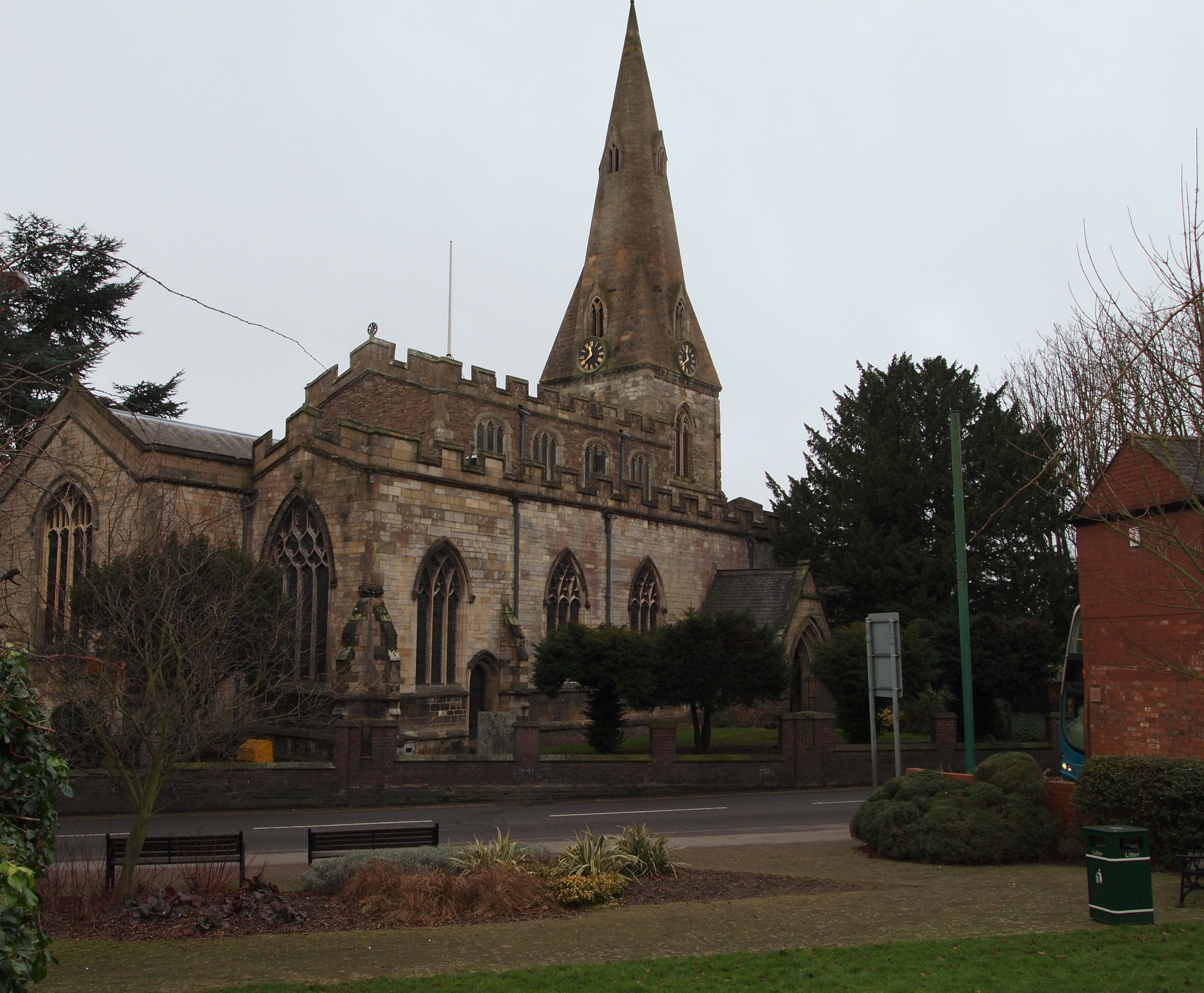
Oadby Church

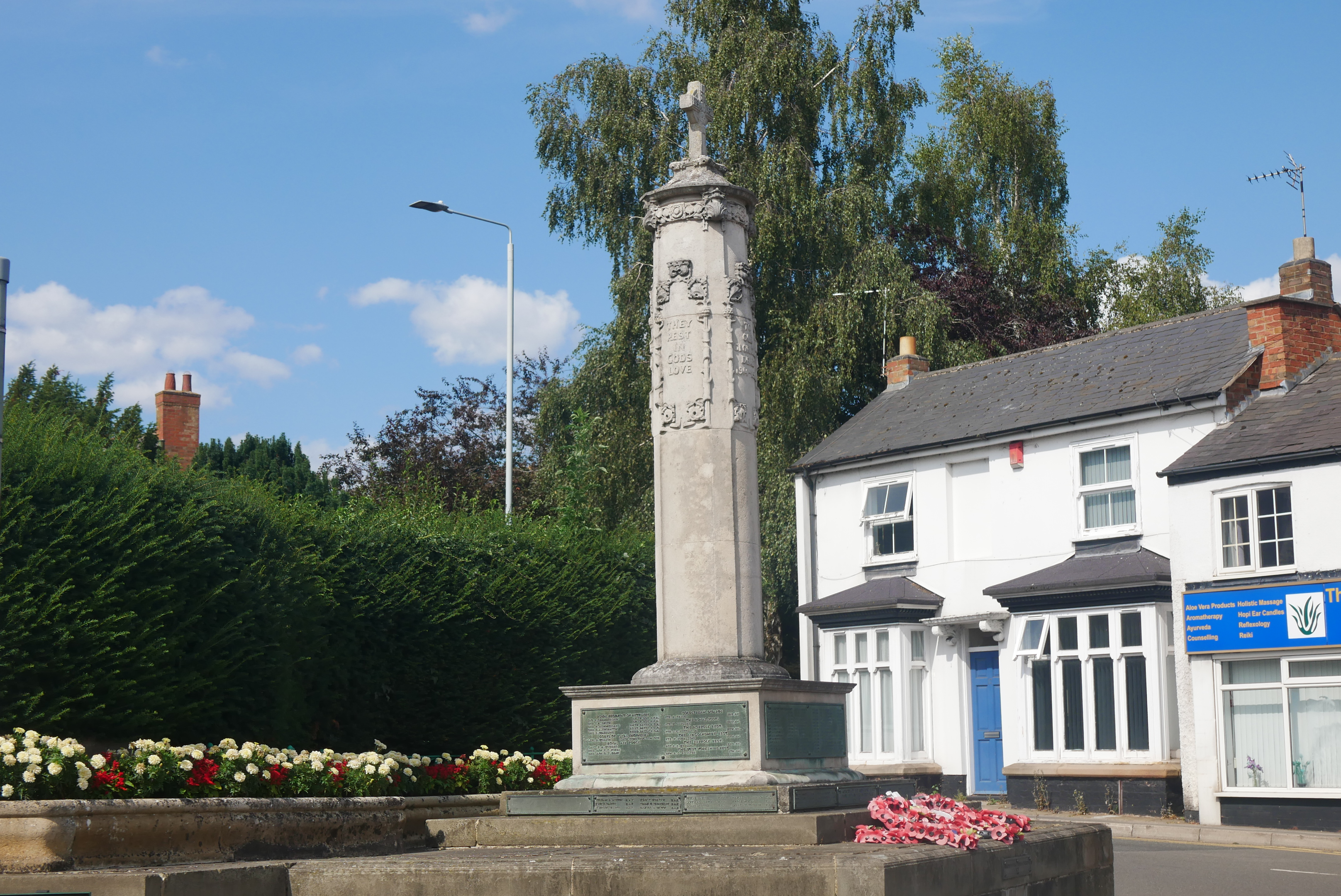
War memorial

Oadby is a large district centre with a good range of shops, services and facilities which are mostly located along The Parade. It is predominantly a residential area for families. Oadby has a diverse population, by age, country of origin and religion. About 20% of the population is under 17 years, 21% over 65 years, 17% were born outside the British Isles and 22%-29% (depending on source) come from ethnically diverse communities.

The town has a mixture of properties, including Edwardian houses, new purpose-built accommodation blocks, three major supermarkets, and restaurants across all price points. Oadby Student Village is situated in the north-east of the town, including residences for the local university students.

Oadby Industrial Estate, situated to the south-west of the town, contains a large number of small and medium-sized businesses.

Notable local parks include Ellis Park, Coombe Park, Rosemead Park, Uplands Park and Brockshill Country Park.

== Sport and culture ==
Leicester Tigers, premiership rugby union club, train at Oval Park on Wigston Road.

== Education ==
Oadby is the home of Beauchamp College (formerly Kibworth Beauchamp Grammar School) and Gartree High School, both of which were attended by John Deacon of Queen. The town also has Oadby Manor High School. The University of Leicester has its halls of residence in the northern part of the town.

== Media ==
Local news and television programmes are provided by BBC East Midlands and ITV Central. Television signals are received from the Waltham TV transmitter. Local radio stations are BBC Radio Leicester, Capital East Midlands, Smooth East Midlands, Hits Radio East Midlands, and Greatest Hits Radio Midlands. The town is served by the local newspaper, the Leicester Mercury (formerly Oadby, Wigston & Blaby Mail).

== Places of worship ==
- St Peter's Church
- Oadby Baptist Church
- Trinity Methodist Church
- St Paul's Church
- Gurdwara (Sikh) Shri Guru Harkrishan Sahib Ji
- Oadby Central Mosque

== Transport ==
The main A6 dual carriageway passes through the town, bypassing the commercial centre. The A563 Leicester Ring Road intersects with the A6 close to Leicester Racecourse to the north of Oadby town centre.

=== Rail ===
The nearest railway stations are Leicester and South Wigston, both less than 3 miles (4.8 km) away.

=== Bus ===
Oadby and the surrounding areas are served by Arriva Midlands routes 31/31A/31E which operate as loops around the housing estates to/from Leicester City Centre, Arriva X3 and Stagecoach X7 both serving nearby villages and towns, including Kibworth and Market Harborough.

Centrebus also operate Orbital which links Oadby Parade to nearby Wigston and Leicester General Hospital.

== Notable residents ==
- Margaret Cooper, innovative nurse and tutor
- John Deacon, bass player of Queen
- James Hawker (poacher), English poacher
