= Meriden, West Midlands =

Village in the West Midlands, England

Coordinates: 52°26′16″N 1°38′59″W

Meriden
- Village and civil parish
- The traditional centre of England

- Location within the West Midlands
- Population: 3,199 (2021 census)
- OS grid reference: SP240824
- Metropolitan borough: Solihull
- Metropolitan county: West Midlands
- Region: West Midlands
- Country: England
- Sovereign state: United Kingdom
- Post town: Coventry
- Postcode district: CV7
- Dialling code: 01676
- Police: West Midlands
- Fire: West Midlands
- Ambulance: West Midlands
- UK Parliament: Meriden

Meriden is a village and civil parish in the Metropolitan Borough of Solihull, West Midlands, England. Historically part of Warwickshire, it lies between the cities of Birmingham and Coventry. It is located close to the North Warwickshire district border within a green belt of the countryside known as the Meriden Gap.

The village is 7.5 miles (12 kilometres) east-northeast of Solihull, 7 miles (11 kilometres) west-northwest of Coventry and 12 miles (19 kilometres) east-southeast of Birmingham city centre. It was known as "Alspath" in the Domesday Book. The village gives its name to the Meriden parliamentary constituency, which was created in 1955 and covers the Meriden Gap. In the 2021 census, the population of Meriden parish was 3,199.

== History ==
The area has been occupied since the Stone Age, as evidenced by flints in the Blythe Valley. Bronze Age swords have also been found in Meriden. In 43 AD, nearby Corley Rocks marked the southern limit of the cattle rearing Cornovii tribe.

The original name of the village was Alspath, meaning "Aelle's path" in Old English. The village was centred on the site of the parish church, overlooking the current village, at the Coventry end of Meriden.

Alspath is listed in the Domesday Book of 1086 as the property of Godiva, the former Countess of Mercia. For the few centuries after the conquest, the whole area was the Forest of Arden. The importance of the hilltop location of Alspath as the hub of the village declined as the 'king's highway' main route from London to Chester and Holyhead developed – in turn encouraging the development of Meriden. The name 'Meriden' derives from the Old English myrge, pleasant, and denu, valley. Between the 15th and 17th centuries, the name 'Meriden' gradually supplanted that of Alspath as the straggling settlement at the foot of the hill grew in importance.

In the late 11th century, the village was small and impoverished, with a population of only nine families (45 persons). The first mention of it as a separate hamlet was in 1230. By the time of Edward I (1272–1307) there was a thriving community 'worth encouraging' in the eyes of the Lord of Alspath. By the reign of Henry VIII, the village was growing more substantial and stretched from the foot of Meriden Hill to where the Bull's Head is now. Ogilivy's Traveller's Guide Book in 1675 describes Meriden as "... A scattering village consisting chiefly of inns". By 1686 the population had grown to 290 people. By 1772 there were 93 cottages and houses. In 1811 the village had 152 homes, 171 families and 817 people."

Meriden was a local distribution point in the 16th-century cattle-driving trade, with the pool at the centre of the old village used to water the animals. Cattle would rest in Meriden before continuing either to the cattle pens at the top of Meriden Hill for the Coventry cattle market, or towards the cattle market then held in Berkswell.

The path of the London–Chester and Holyhead road gained strategic and commercial importance over time. The section which ran through Coventry to the bottom of Meriden Hill became a turnpike in 1723. Thomas Telford renovated the whole route to Holyhead in 1810, lowering Meriden Hill and thus bypassing the Queen's Head pub and the 'old road'. This 'Telford road' remained the main Coventry to Birmingham Road until 1958, when the village was bypassed by the A45 dual carriageway. The old, narrow road past the Queen's Head is the site of the pre-Telford turnpike.

The shape of the current centre of the village, around the green, was another product of enclosure post-1785. Whilst the west end of the village had previously been the meeting place of lanes coming in to the main London-Chester road from Fillongley, Maxstoke and Packington; the ultimate shape was completed with another enclosure provision "staking out a new road to Hampton-in-Arden across the Heath".

=== Manor and overlordship ===
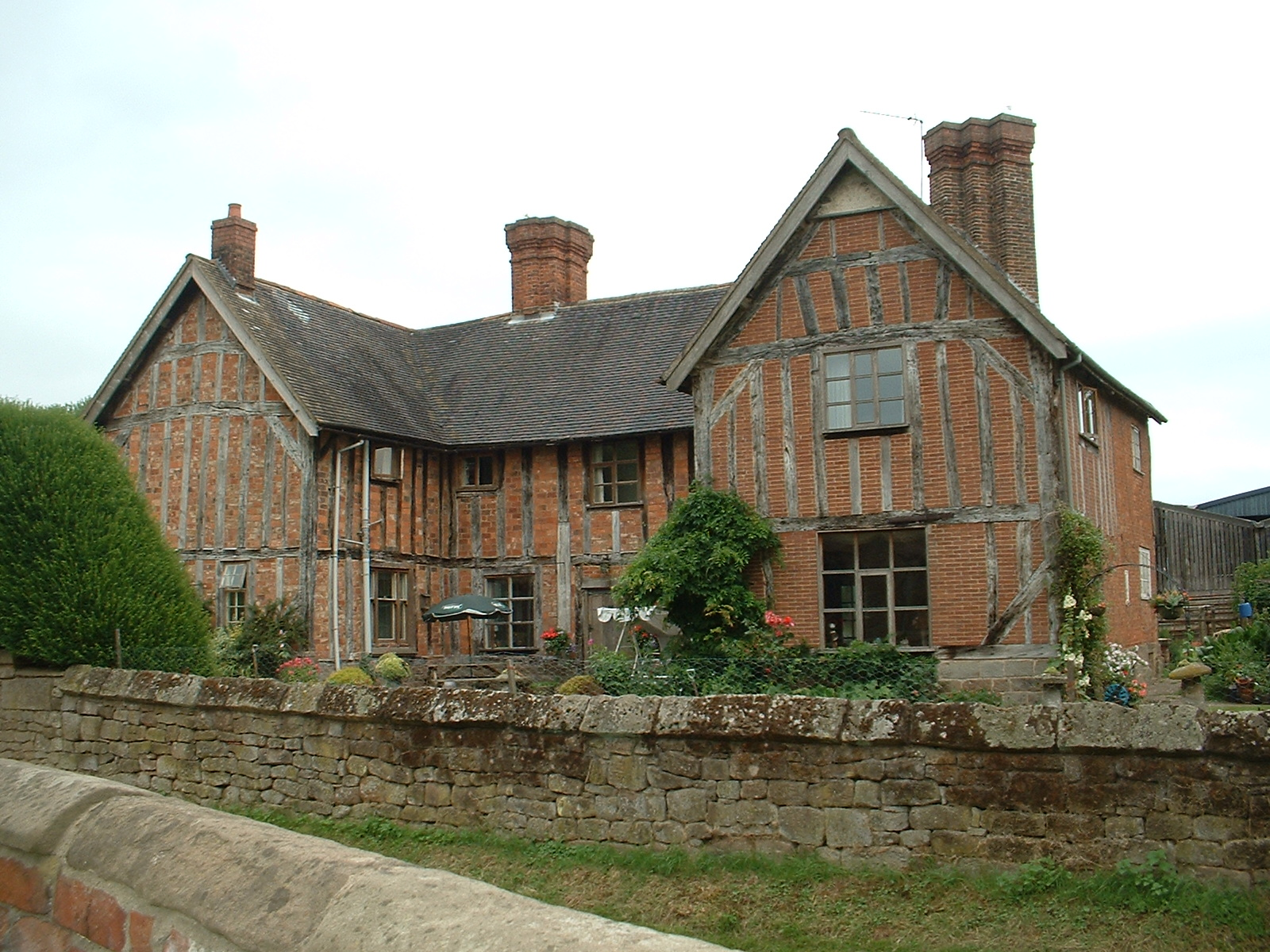
15th-century Moat House

Following the Norman Conquest, the overlordship of Alspath passed successively through the hands of the Earls of Chester (1080), the Segrave family (1220), the Mowbray Earls of Norfolk (late 14th century), the Stanley Earls of Derby (1468/1501), and the Earls of Aylesford (1784).

Of the lords of the manor owing fealty to those overlords, two in particular who contributed to events in English history or to the parish church. Ivo of Alspath was the first Norman holder of the knight's fee that was Alspath. He took his name from the village. Under the overlordship of the Earl of Chester, he built the core of the current church of St. Laurence (circa 1150) for reasons covered below. After his death the manor was split amongst his four daughters:

- A manor based on the original siting, around the church and occupied since 1481 by the building of Moat House farm.
- The manor of Alspath Hall, the remains of which are sited in a field off the access to the A45 from Showell Lane.
- A manor that became the property of Meriden Hall.
- The building and land known as Walsh Hall (formerly and alternately as Wyard's Place).
- The fifth subdivision (Marbrook Hall) near Hollyberry End, near the junction of Shaft Lane and Becks Lane, is now considered a later claim.

The second was Gerard (or Gerald) II of Alspath (d. 1282). He was involved with the escape from the Tower of London of Roger Mortimer, 1st Earl of March. His wife Millicent gave the name to what is now known as Millisons Wood, at the far east end of the village, at the top of Meriden Hill.

=== In history ===
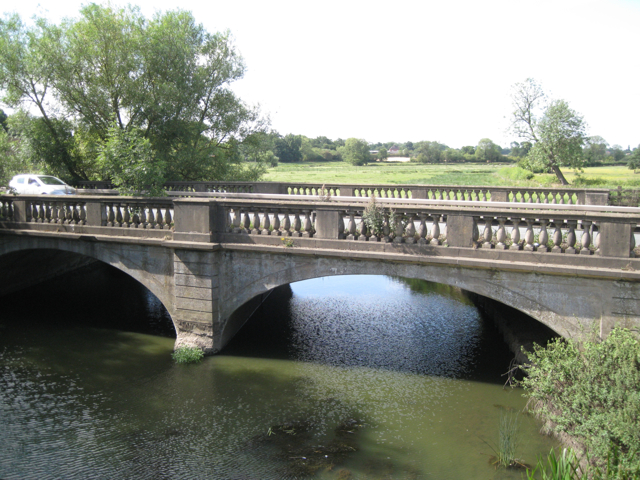
Molands Bridge over the Blythe in Meriden

Meriden has never itself been a significant location in English and British history. It is, however, located within a narrow band of castles with significant historical interest. 3 miles (5 kilometres) to the north is Maxstoke Castle, one of the three seats of the Stafford Dukes of Buckingham in the mid-to-late 15th century and deemed to be a favourite residence of Lady Margaret Beaufort after her second marriage into the Stafford family. 8 miles (13 kilometres) south is Kenilworth Castle, site of the longest siege in English history; and 15 miles (24 kilometres) south is Warwick Castle, the seat of Warwick the Kingmaker, Richard Neville, 16th Earl of Warwick.

The escape of the powerful Marcher lord, Roger Mortimer, 1st Earl of March, one of only two escapes from the Tower of London in its history, involves a critical Meriden connection. Constable Stephen Segrave and deputy constable of the Tower Gerard Alspath were overlord and lord of the manor of Alspath, respectively. Gerard was implicated in the escape; but Segrave escaped the initial reprisal, as described by the 14th-century chronicler Henry Knighton from St Mary de Pratis Abbey, Leicester, better known as Leicester Abbey: listing Stephen's excuse being that he had been duped by a supposedly loyal servant in whom he had confidence, Gerard Alspath. Another person involved in the escape was a progenitor of John Wyard of what is now Walsh Hall, whose effigy resides in the parish church.

After the death in 1460 of Humphrey Stafford, 1st Duke of Buckingham, the previous owner of Maxstoke Castle, at the Battle of Northampton, an inquisition was held in Alspath to determine the heirs and liabilities for his estates.

By the late 15th century the overlord was Thomas Stanley, 1st Earl of Derby.

Queen Elizabeth I stayed at the previous house on the site of Meriden Hall in 1575.

The last male Walsh owner of Walsh Hall, Sir Richard Walsh, was the Sheriff of Worcestershire who cornered the last group of Gunpowder Plot conspirators in 1605.

Shortly before the first battle of the English Civil War in 1642, 30 miles (48 kilometres) south at Edgehill, the royal army camped on Meriden Heath whilst the King slept at nearby Packington Hall.

When Bonnie Prince Charlie marched south in the last of the great Jacobite rebellions in 1745, the government forces, recalled from the continent and assembled to oppose him, waited on Meriden Heath under the command of the Duke of Cumberland.

The novelist George Eliot visited her sister in Meriden repeatedly until 1854. Her sister is buried in the churchyard of St Laurence's parish church.

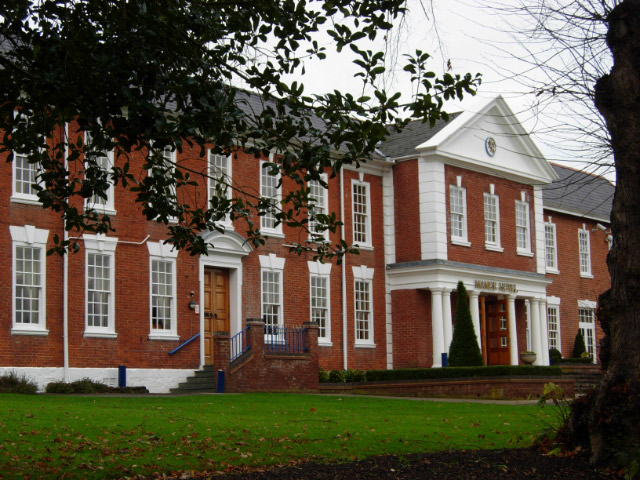
The Manor Hotel, Meriden

In 1897, Jane (Jeannie) Monckton founded Meriden School, located in Strathfield, an inner-western suburb of Sydney, Australia, which took the name 'Meriden' from this town. It was named due to the happy memories that her husband had as a child holidaying in Meriden, and the hope that the school would be a similar place of happy childhood memories.

The grindcore band Napalm Death was formed in Meriden in 1981

== Governance ==
At the lower level of local government, Meriden is a civil parish with a parish council of eight elected members.

At the upper level, Meriden is in the Metropolitan Borough of Solihull. For elections to Solihull Metropolitan Borough Council, since boundary changes in 2026 it has been in Meriden & Arden electoral ward.

Historically, Meriden was in the Hemlingford Hundred of Warwickshire. From 1894, it was in Meriden Rural District. In 1974, the rural district was abolished and Meriden merged into Solihull in the newly created West Midlands county.

== Demographics ==
At the 2021 census, Meriden had a population of 3,199 people in 1,414 households. It is the most rural part of Solihull, with a much lower population density than the borough average.

Census population of Meriden parish
Census	Population	Female	Male	Households	Source
2001	2,734	1,409	1,325	1,212	
2011	2,719	1,389	1,330	1,221	
2021	3,199	1,613	1,586	1,414	

== Traditional centre of England ==
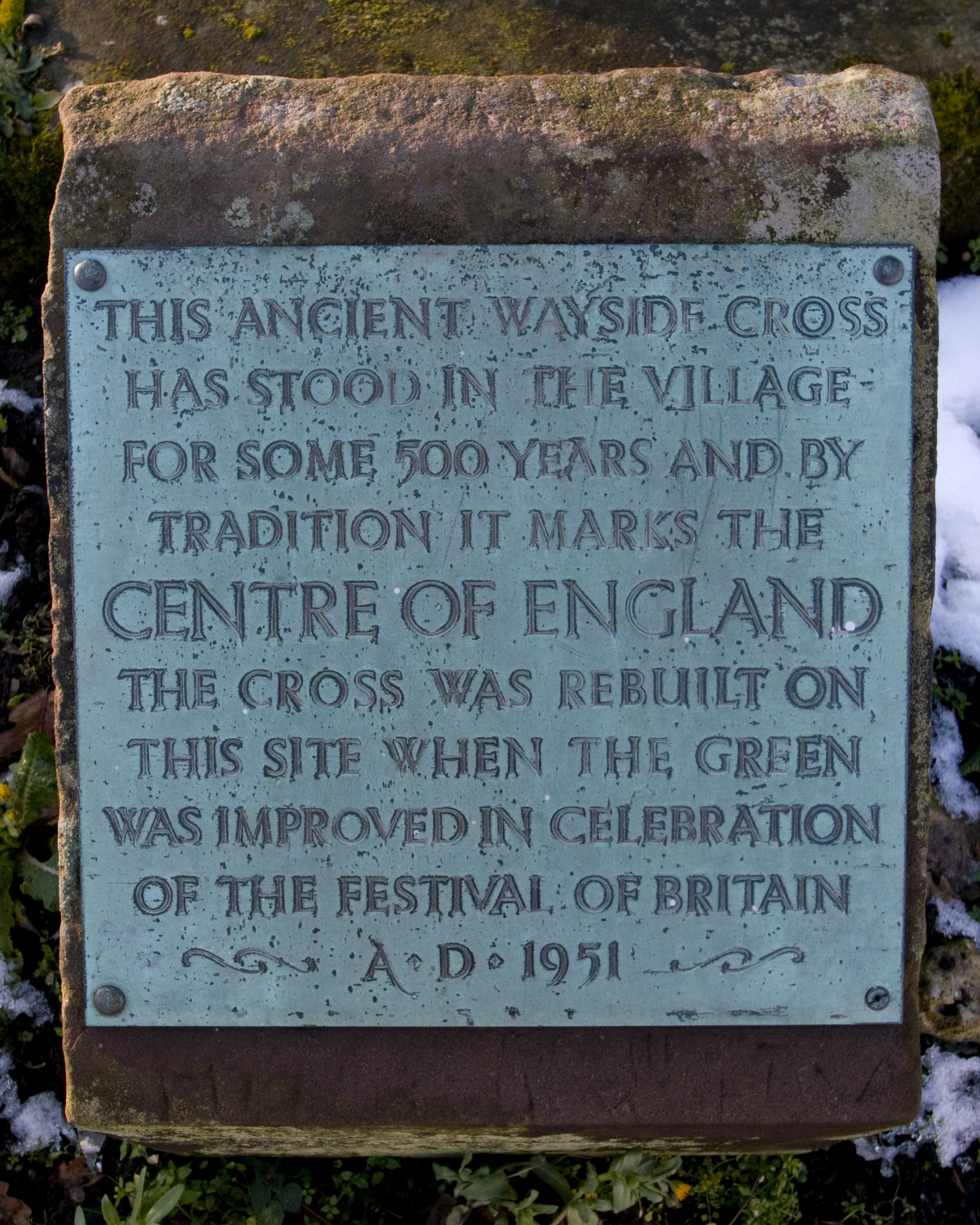
Meriden cross plaque

Meriden was identified as the centre of England in 1829. That designation was shown to be inaccurate in 1920, when the first systematic attempt was made to validate the claim.

A grade II listed sandstone monument on the village green carries a plaque commemorating Meriden's status as centre of England. Traditionally known as the sandstone cross, a photograph from 1879 shows a garland that would have originally enclosed a cross on top of the monument, like the one at Hockwold cum Wilton. The garland was lost between 1879 and 1885. The cross was originally located in the old centre of the village, where the road initially came in from Berkswell before the junction was straightened in 1785. The monument was moved to the village green in 1822. It was moved yet again to its current position on the green in 1952–1953.

Also on the village green is a memorial bench to Walter MacGregor "Robbie" Robinson (died 17 September 1956). He was also known as Wayfarer and had a major role in promoting cycle touring for the general public in the UK from the 1920s onwards through writing, giving lectures and as a cycling role model. The bench was installed by the Cyclists' Touring Club.

== St Laurence parish church ==
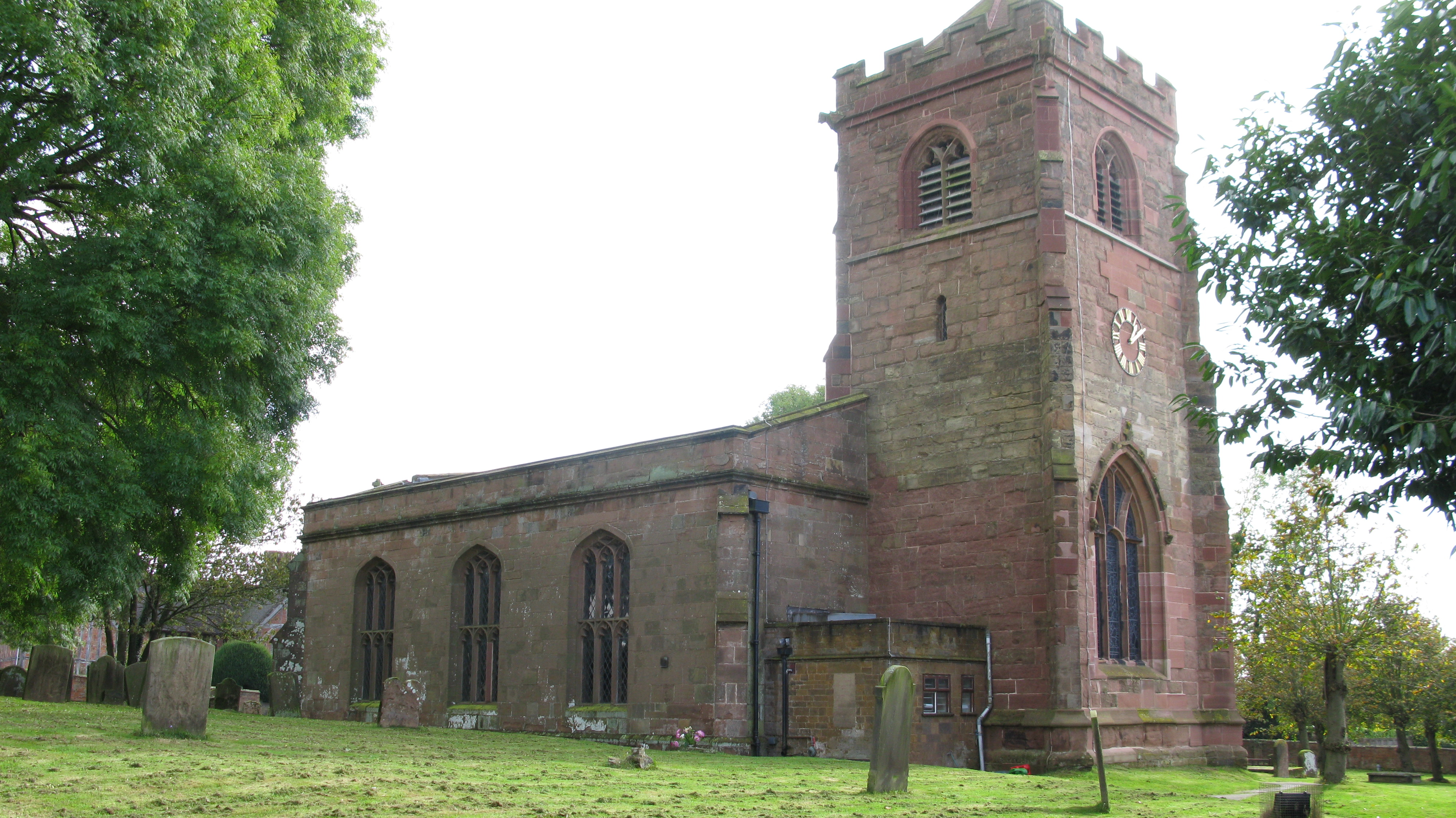
St Laurence's Church from the north

The parish church of St. Laurence was built on the site of a simple Saxon church, dedicated to St. Edmund, erected on her own land by Lady Godiva – the wife of Leofric, Earl of Mercia in the years prior to the Norman conquest.

The present church was built in several stages. The nave and two-thirds of the chancel were finished by the late 12th century – late Norman – and were probably built as an expiation for sins committed during the civil war between Stephen and Matilda by Ivo de Alspath. St Mary's Priory, Coventry, and the Benedictine Priory at Monk's Kirby near Rugby being two notable targets of his overlord, the Earl of Chester's, raiding parties – the earl having remained aloof from taking sides and instead forming marauding bands to raid, pillage and to pocket crown taxes.

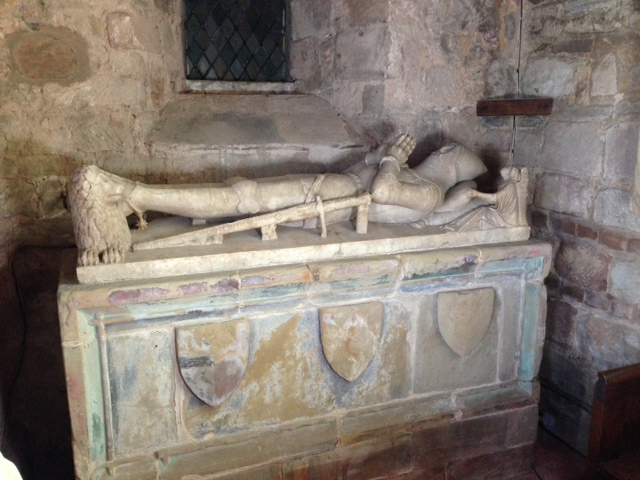
Effigy of John Wyard - died 1404

The chancel was extended in the 13th century, and the south aisle and the tower were added in the late 14th. The north aisle was added, and the Norman roof was replaced in the 15th century.

Around 1831, both aisles were demolished and rebuilt with galleries to provide more space for the congregation. It is possible see the industrial quality of the stonework outside the building compared to the 14th or 15th century stone used inside. A few gravestones have been used in the external stonework.

In 1883, the church was restored again, and those galleries were removed. At some point the 15th century wooden ceilings of both nave and chancel had been plastered over, and these were uncovered during a restoration in 1924. Finally, extensive restorations of the medieval roof and tower were carried out circa 2006–10.

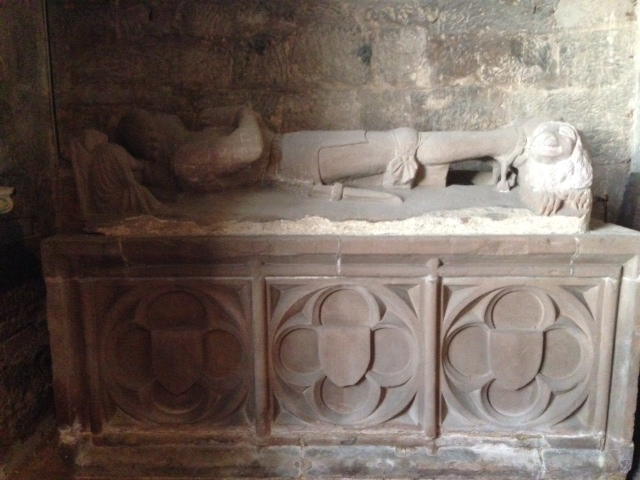
Effigy Thought to be of Sir Thomas Bottler - died 1460

The current siting of alabaster effigies in the church is of 20th-century origin. There are pictures of an earlier 19th century siting in the centre of the nave. To the right, where his chantry was located is John Wyard, a late 14th century man at arms (never knighted) who was part of the retinue for the then Beauchamp Earl of Warwick. The effigy to the left represents Sir Thomas Bottiler who died at the Battle of Northampton (at the same time as the 1st Duke of Buckingham.

On the left is a squint, an opening allowing penitents from a side chapel to witness the raising of the Host at the main altar.

The ecclesiastical parish is in the Diocese of Coventry. The Saint Laurence (or Lawrence, the spelling is interchangeable) to whom it is dedicated may be either Lawrence of Rome who was one of the seven deacons of the early church martyred during the persecution of Emperor Valerian in 258 AD; or it may have been Laurence of Canterbury who became the second Archbishop of Canterbury in 604 AD. Legend favours the latter, although, from 1318 onward, the choice of 10 August for the Patronal feast day and the village fair (until 1959) would indicate the Roman Lawrence.

The Heart of England Way long-distance path, linking the Staffordshire heathlands together with the Cotswolds and the Forest of Arden, passes through the churchyard.

== National Cyclists Memorial ==
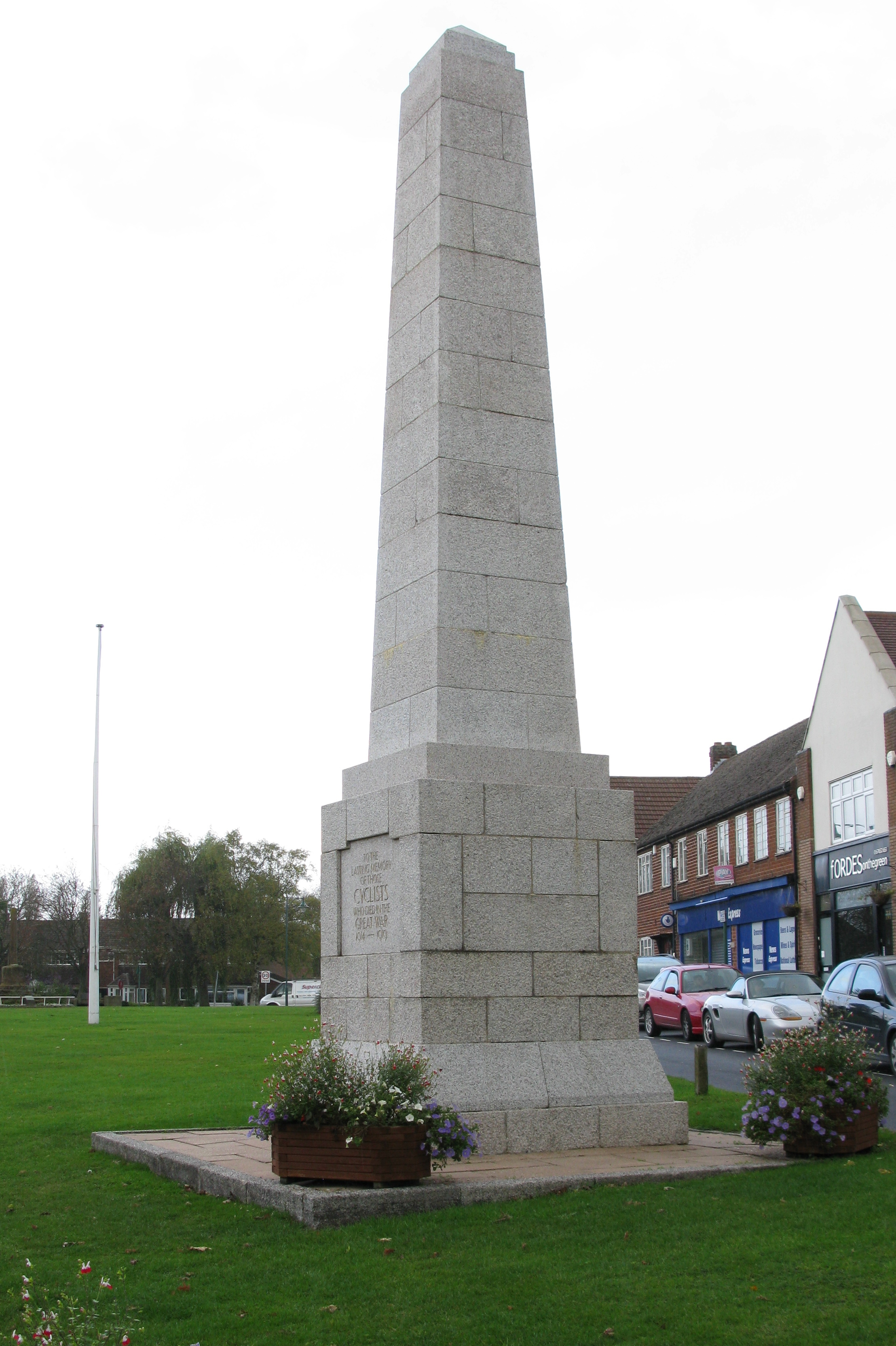
The Cyclists War Memorial

Meriden is home to a memorial obelisk dedicated to the cyclists who died in the First World War. National cycling organisations commemorate these deaths with an annual mid-May service on the green. The 30-foot (9-metre) grey granite memorial originally cost £1,100 and was unveiled on 21 May 1921 in the presence of over 20,000 cyclists.

The village's own war memorial is at the junction of Berkswell Road and Main Road, opposite the pool. It takes the form of a wayside shrine with a crucified Jesus and is located on the land donated by Letitia Banks, heiress of Meriden Hall and wife of Captain Edward Banks. Edward Banks was the first WWI death from the village, due to friendly fire at the Battle of St Julien in 1915. He is commemorated in a stained glass window in the church.

== Triumph motorcycles ==
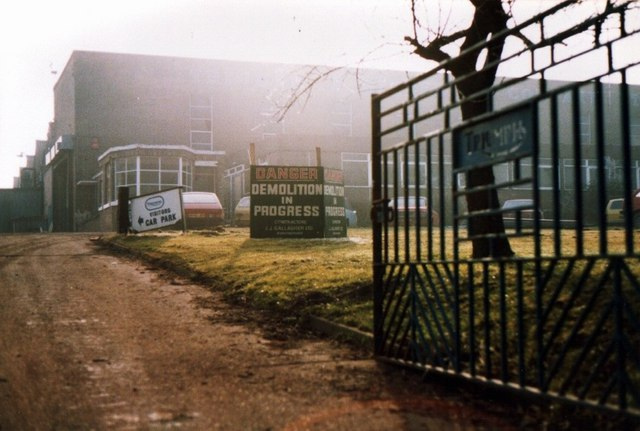
Demolition of the Triumph Motorcycles factory, January 1984

From 1941 until 1983, Meriden was associated with the large Triumph motorcycles production plant. Its original Priory Street factory in Coventry was destroyed by the Luftwaffe during World War II. As documented in the book Forty Summers Ago, the factory was visited by Steve McQueen and Bud Ekins with the rest of the 1964 U.S. International Six Day Trials team to collect their specially prepared Triumphs. In 1973, Triumph workers blockaded the factory from the new owners, Norton Villiers Triumph (NVT), to prevent closure. The government loaned the subsequent Meriden Workers Co-Operative money to buy the factory and later to market the Triumph motorcycles they produced. The sit-in and formation of the co-operative were the subject of much media interest including David Edgar's play, Events Following The Closure Of A Motorcycle Factory. Trading later as Triumph Motorcycles (Meriden) Ltd., the co-operative eventually closed in August 1983, the factory being demolished the following year. A new company, Triumph Motorcycles Ltd was established in 1984, and moved to Hinckley in Leicestershire, in 1988.

A housing development was built on the site of the Triumph motorcycle factory at Meriden, now known as Millisons Wood, up the hill out of the main village. Road names on the estate include Triumph motorcycle model names Bonneville Close and Daytona Drive. A plaque commemorating the site's former use stands outside Bonneville Close.
