= V. H. Galbraith =

English historian (1889–1976)

- Born: 15 December 1889; Sheffield, England
- Died: 25 November 1976 (aged 86); Oxford, England
- Education: Highgate School; Manchester University; Balliol College, Oxford
- Occupation: Historian
- Known for: Works involving, and reappraising the purpose of, the Domesday Book
- Title: Regius Professor of Modern History
- Term: 1947–1957
- Predecessor: Maurice Powicke
- Successor: Hugh Trevor-Roper
- Spouse: Georgina Rosalie Cole-Baker 1921–1976
- Children: 3, including Mary Moore and Jane Barbour

Vivian Hunter Galbraith FBA (15 December 1889 – 25 November 1976) was an English historian, fellow of the British Academy and Oxford Regius Professor of Modern History.

== Early career ==
Galbraith was born in Sheffield, son of David Galbraith, a secretary at the steelworks in Hadfield, and Eliza Davidson McIntosh. He moved with his family to London, and was educated at Highgate School from 1902 to 1906. The family then moved to Manchester, where he attended Manchester University from 1907, and where his lecturers included Maurice Powicke, Thomas Frederick Tout and James Tait. Galbraith would later write the biographical articles on Tout and Tait for the Dictionary of National Biography. Another historian who influenced him was H. W. C. Davis. Galbraith was awarded a first class in modern history by the University in 1910, and won a Brackenbury scholarship to Balliol College, Oxford. At Oxford, he won the Stanhope prize in 1911 with an essay on the chronicles of St Albans, achieved a third class in literae humaniores in 1913, and a first class in modern history in 1914.

Galbraith became the Langton research fellow at Manchester University and began studying the records of Bury St Edmunds Abbey. Following the outbreak of World War I, he enlisted in January 1915. He served as a company commander in the Queen's Regiment and was awarded the Croix de Guerre avec palme for his courage in Palestine in 1917 and France in 1918.

In January 1919 Galbraith resumed the academic life, initially as a temporary lecturer at Manchester, and then continuing with his former research on a renewed Langton research fellowship, while living in London. He joined the Public Record Office in January 1921 as an assistant keeper, allowing him daily access to records about English medieval government. At this time he started work on editing an edition of the Anonimalle Chronicle of St Mary's Abbey, York, published in 1927.

== Return to Oxford ==
In 1928 Galbraith succeeded Reginald Poole as lecturer in diplomatic, and was elected a tutorial fellow of Balliol. Between pursuing his teaching, lecturing, discussion, and golfing he continued working on chronicles and charters, including the St Albans Chronicle, 1406–20, published in 1937. Before the end of the year he took up the professorship of history at Edinburgh University. In 1940, he was elected Ford's lecturer.

In 1944 Galbraith succeeded Albert Frederick Pollard as director of the Institute of Historical Research. That same year, in his lecture entitled "Good Kings and Bad Kings in Medieval History", he challenged the overall reliance of historians on the chroniclers whose works were often emotional judgments than constructive criticisms of contemporary figures, concluding that William Rufus and King John were more misrepresented than any other monarch due to conflict with the clerical hierarchy.

In January 1948 Galbraith succeeded Sir Maurice Powicke as Regius Professor of Modern History. He was elected an honorary fellow of Balliol in 1957, and of Oriel in 1958.

Galbraith intensely disliked Hugh Trevor-Roper and in 1951 threatened to resign if Trevor-Roper was appointed to the Chair of Modern History. This animosity was reciprocated, Trevor-Roper accusing Galbraith of contributing to a provincial and backward-looking culture in the study of history at Oxford. Galbraith blocked Trevor-Roper's application to give the Ford Lectures in 1956.

Galbraith's works include a reappraisal of the purpose of Domesday Book, a series of critically edited texts and translations of medieval sources, his work between 1942 and 1974 resulting in Domesday Book: Its Place in Administrative History, published by Oxford University Press on 23 January 1975. His 1957 essay on the structure of Henry Knighton's Chronicle successfully proved that Knighton most likely wrote its final two volumes, rather than the Continuator of Knighton who had previously been suggested.

Galbraith retired as Regius Professor of Modern History in 1957. Galbraith's retirement precipitated a celebrated contest for election to the Regius Professorship which resulted in the election of Hugh Trevor-Roper, despite popular support for A. J. P. Taylor and Galbraith's wish to see R. W. Southern appointed. Galbraith died on 25 November 1976 at his home at 20A Bradmore Road, Oxford.

== Personal life ==
Galbraith married Georgina Rosalie Cole-Baker, daughter of Lyster Cole-Baker MD, at All Saints' Church Catherington on 1 July 1921. She was a medieval historian whom he had met at Manchester; her study of The Constitution of the Dominican Order 1216–1360, including an edition of British Library Additional MS. 23935, was published by Manchester University Press in 1925. The couple had three children, Jane (1922–2012), Jim (1925–2009) and Georgina Mary (b. 1930). Jane was a researcher into African artefacts and the Arts and Crafts movement, as well as an energetic social campaigner. In 1946, she married Kenneth Michael Barbour, professor of geography at the University of Ibadan and the University of Ulster at Coleraine, and guest professor at the University of Nairobi: they had four daughters and one son. Jim became Under-Secretary in the Industrial Relations Division of the Ministry of Labour and was awarded the CB in 1990. He married, in 1954, Isobel Gibson Graham, a teacher who was later prominent on the board of the Girls' Day School Trust: they had two sons. Mary joined the Diplomatic Service in 1951 and became First Secretary to the UK Permanent Delegation to the United Nations in 1961, resigning on her marriage to Antony Ross Moore in 1963. She was principal of St Hilda's College, Oxford, from 1980 to 1990.

== Honours ==
In 1939, Galbraith was elected a Fellow of the British Academy (FBA).

In 1957, he was awarded a Festschrift: it was titled Facsimiles of English Royal Writs to A.D. 1100, and edited by T. A. M. Bishop and Pierre Chaplais.

== Works ==
- Anonimalle Chronicle of St Mary's, York (ed.) (1927)
- An Introduction to the Use of the Public Records (Oxford University Press, 1934; 2nd ed. 1935)
- St Albans Chronicle, 1406–20 (ed.) (1937)
- Studies in the Public Records (Edinburgh: Thomas Nelson, 1949). The Ford Lectures for 1941.
- The Making of Domesday Book (Oxford University Press, 1961)
- "A Draft of Magna Carta (1215)". Proceedings of the British Academy. 53: 345–360. 1967.
- Domesday Book: Its Place in Administrative History (Oxford University Press, 1974)

== See also ==
- Knighton's Chronicon

== Sources ==
- Southern, R. W. (2021) [2004]. "Galbraith, Vivian Hunter (1889–1976)". Oxford Dictionary of National Biography (online ed.). Oxford University Press. doi:10.1093/ref:odnb/31132. (Subscription, Wikipedia Library access or UK public library membership required.)
- Sisman, Adam (2010). Hugh Trevor-Roper: The Biography. London: Weidenfeld and Nicolson. ISBN 978-0297852148.
