= Knighton's Chronicon =

14th-century historical account written by Henry Knighton in Leicester

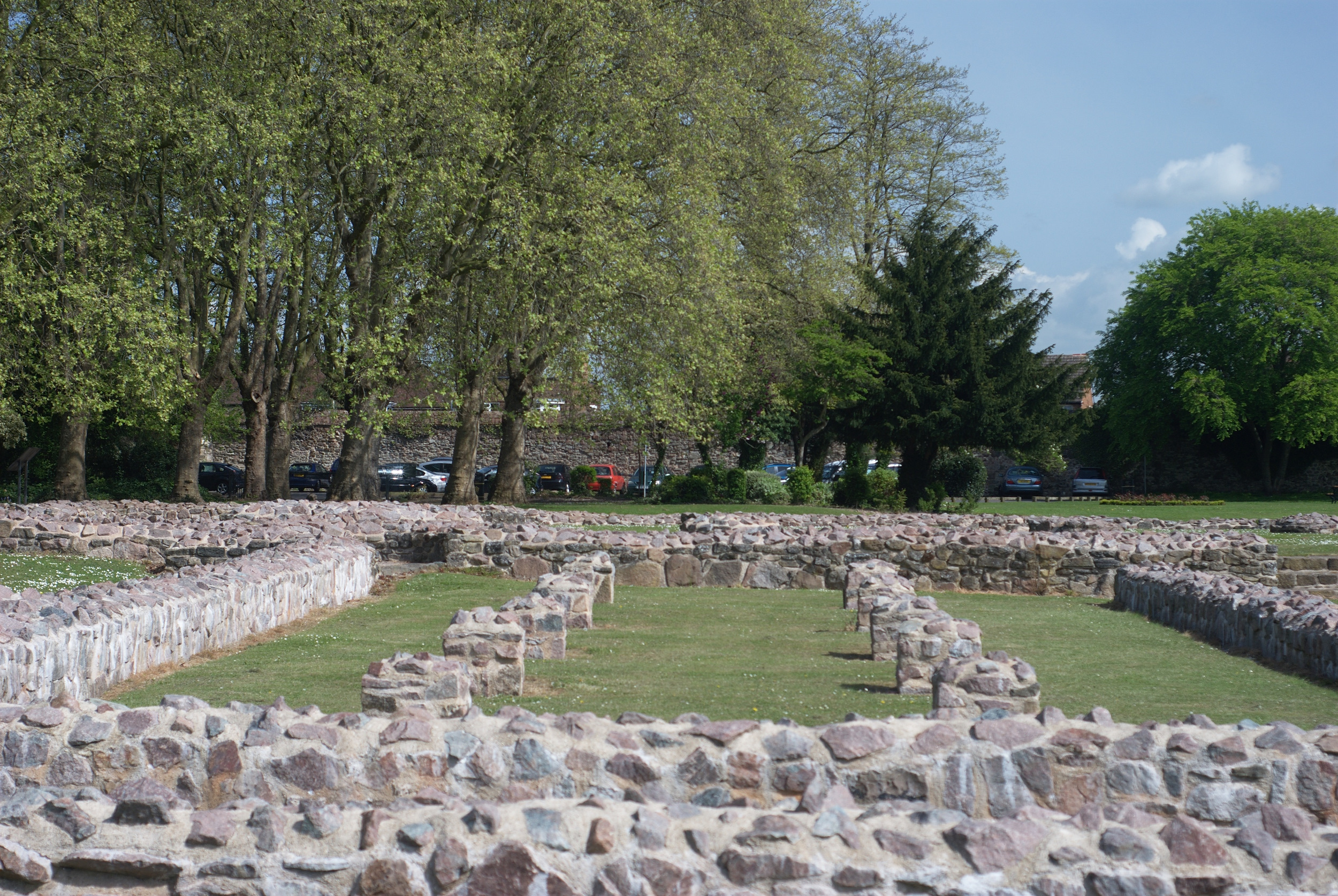
Ruins of the Abbey of Saint Mary de Pratis, more commonly known as Leicester Abbey.

Knighton's Chronicon (also known as Knighton's Leicester Chronicle) is an English chronicle written by Henry Knighton in the fourteenth century. He referred to it as his "work in hand" that he wrote while at the Augustinian Abbey of Saint Mary de Pratis, associated with the House of Lancaster, where he was a canon.

== The chronicle ==
Knighton wrote a four-volume chronicle, first published in 1652, giving the history of England from 959 to 1366. It was originally considered that a fellow canon completed the work in a fifth book, covering the years 1377 to 1395, probably due to Knighton's growing blindness (see the "Continuator of Knighton", below). The earlier books (to 1337) are simply re-workings of earlier histories. But the latter two books are vital to the contemporary study of the period, since they were written by informed scholars who actually lived through the times they write about. The latter two books give us an exemplary and detailed first-hand insight into the 14th century - such as the effects of the Black Death and the consequent breakdown of the feudal system, and precise details of the systems of wages and prices in England. He also reflects the prejudices common among the clergy at the time; notably being against the translation of the Bible into the common tongue, lamenting the low standards of scholarship among young religious clerks, and being strongly against the rising of the Lollards.

"This Master John Wyclif translated into the Anglic (English) -not Angelic-tongue, the Gospel that Christ gave to the clergy and the doctors of the Church, that they might minister it gently to laymen and weaker persons, according to the exigence of their time, their personal wants, and the hunger of their minds; whence it is made vulgar by him, and more open to the reading of laymen and women than it usually is to the knowledge of lettered and intelligent clergy; and thus the pearl of the Gospel is cast forth and trodden under the feet of swine."

== Continuator of Knighton's Chronicon ==
The Continuator of Knighton (or "Knighton's Continuator") was a supposed late 14th century continuator of Knighton's chronicle.

The Continuator's existence was first supposed by the nineteenth-century historian Walter Waddington Shirley, who noted a lengthy break in events described by the Chronicle, and concluded that the later section had been written by a different and unnamed author, commencing in 1377. Shirley also posited that the Continuator had been a foreigner of Lancastrian sympathies, though with little affection for the English language, who had managed to obtain a position in Leicester Abbey.

Shirley's theory was taken up by J. Rawson Lumby, a classicist and Hebraicist who edited Knighton's Chronicle in the 1880s for the Rolls Series. Despite some reservations about the Continuator's existence, Lumby also concluded a different author had written the post-1377 sections. His division of the Chronicle's authorship was followed by later authors, with the result that the Continuator was referenced in subsequent historical study footnotes of learned historians that followed him.

The existence of the Continuator was not questioned until 1957, when the historian Vivian Hunter Galbraith published an in-depth study of the Chronicle's chronology. In particular, he was able to prove that the section of the Chronicle covering later events, from 1377–95, was actually written before the earlier section, confirming Knighton's probable authorship of both sections. The current academic view agrees with Galbraith in that the Continuator most likely never existed, and Knighton wrote the entire Chronicle.

== See also ==
- Chronicon Anonymi Cantuariensis

== Sources ==
- Aston Margaret, Lollardy and the gentry in the later Middle Ages, Palgrave Macmillan, 1997, ISBN 0312173881
- Gordon, Donald James, Fritz Saxl, 1890-1948: a volume of memorial essays from his friends in England, T. Nelson, 1957
- Martin, Geoffrey Haward (translator); Knighton's Chronicle 1337-1396; Clarendon Press, 1995, ISBN 0198205031
- Myers, A. R., English Historical Documents 1327-1485, Psychology Press, 1996, ISBN 0415143691
