= Ingarsby =

Medieval village in England

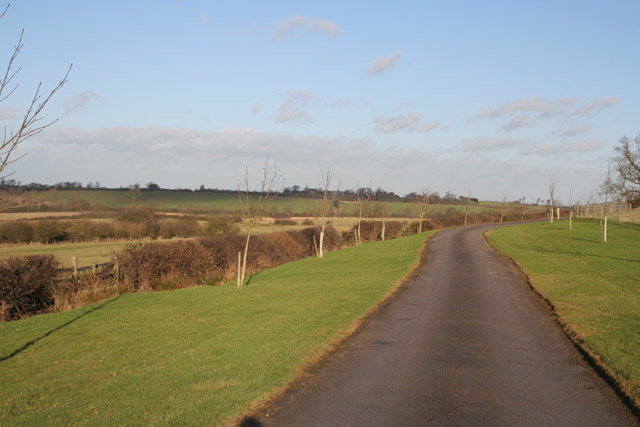
A view near Old Ingarsby

Ingarsby is one of the best preserved deserted medieval villages in England. It is situated about six miles (10 km) to the east of Leicester, and a little to the north of Houghton on the Hill. The majority of the site, which is situated on a west facing slope and lies on both sides of the Houghton to Hungarton (where the remaining population is included) road, is now a scheduled monument.

The settlement was probably founded by a Danish individual named Ingwar, and as such was referred to as "Ingwar's village". This places its origins at some point in the 9th or 10th century. By Norman times, the settlement had grown to a substantial village for the Domesday Book of 1086 reports 32 heads of households present. When the majority of the manor, at that time owned by the Daungervills, was granted to Leicester Abbey in 1352, a dozen families lived in the village.

Desertion occurred in 1469 when the abbey enclosed the whole of the land and converted most of it to sheep and cattle pastures. It was by far the most valuable grange property in Leicestershire when it was sold at the Reformation in 1540.

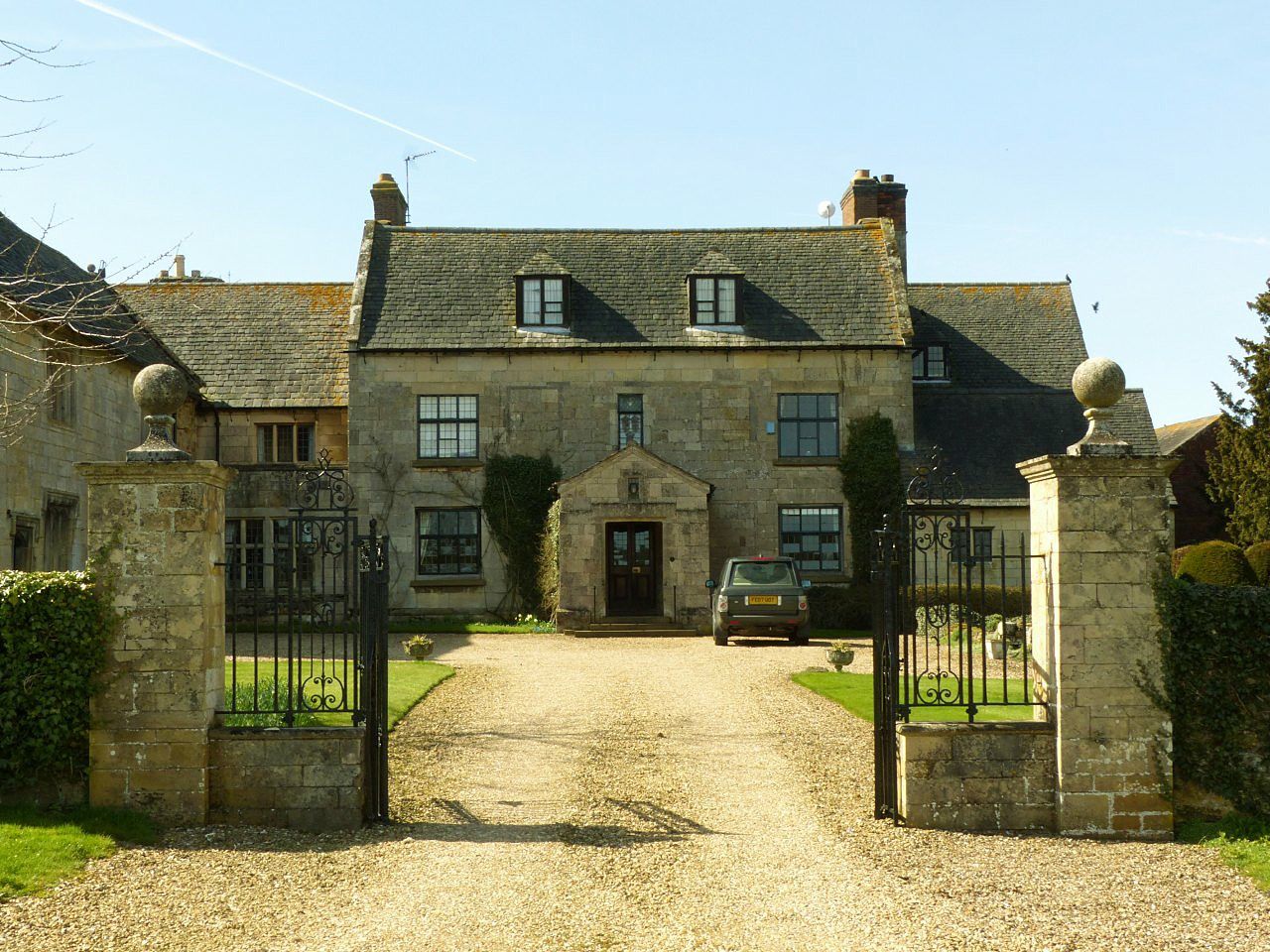
Ingarsby Old Hall

On the dissolution of Leicester Abbey, the Cave family had a large share in the plunder for the impropriate Rectory of Hungerton and the Manor of Ingarsby which were granted to Sir Brian Cave, Sheriff of Leicestershire, and his wife Margaret Throckmorton, daughter of Sir George Throckmorton, by the Crown in 1540. Ingarsby Old Hall, which was built by Brian Cave when he acquired the manor after the dissolution of the monasteries, was originally moated on three sides. The oldest fabric dates to the 1540s in the east range. Another range was added by Sir Robert Bannister who bought the manor in 1621.

"Ingarsby Old Hall and Chapel and Garden Wall" is Grade II listed.

All that remains of the village are well delineated rectangular mounds that mark the house-sites of the arable farmers that were driven out, and the hollow ways where the village streets and lanes once ran.

== See also ==
- Ingarsby railway station
- Quenby Hall
