= Mary Moore (author) =

British author, diplomat and administrator

Georgina Mary Moore (née Galbraith; 8 April 1930 – 6 October 2017) was a British author, diplomat and administrator, the principal of St Hilda's College, Oxford, from 1980 to 1990. She published several novels, radio and television plays under the pen name Helena Osborne.

Georgina Mary Galbraith was the daughter of the historian Vivian Hunter Galbraith and the mediaeval historian Georgina Rosalie Cole-Baker. She was an honorary fellow of Lady Margaret Hall, Oxford. She was also a trustee of The Rhodes Trust (1984-1998).

She was married to the diplomat A.R. Moore from 1963 until his death in 2000.

== Publications ==
=== As Helena Osborne ===
- The Arcadian Affair (1969)
- Pay Day (1972)
- White Poppy (1977)
- The Joker (1979)
