= Alspath =

Ancient settlement in West Midlands, England

Alspath (early spelling Ailespede) is first recorded in the 1086 Domesday Book and was the ancient name of the original settlement in what is known today as the parish of Meriden, West Midlands (originally Warwickshire) situated between Birmingham and Coventry. The name means "Aelles path across the heath".

Alspath was held in two main manors. The first Manor of Alspath (overlordship) was first held by Countess Godiva during the reign of Edward the Confessor when she was known as Lady of the Manor of Alspath. It is likely that a church dedicated to Saint Edmund was founded here by Lady Godiva, but although documentary records have been uncovered no physical remains have been found. Over the years Alspath became a place for people to go for healing.

The following Lords and Ladies of Alspath, heirs and individuals were:

- Countess Godiva (1066) Tenant-in-chief (1086)
- Nicholas (thought to be a royal agent) (1086)
- Earl of Chester (pre 1235)
- Hugh d'Aubigny (1235)
- The Segrave family (mid 13C)
- The Earls of Derby (late 15C/early16C)

Under the overlord, the Manor of Alspath, a 'Knight's Fee' in the feudal system, was held by Ivo de Ellespathe in 1155. After his death the estate was split into five - see Meriden, West Midlands - the sizes of which waxed and waned over the years. The following Lords and Ladies of Alspath, heirs and individuals were:

- Alice de Ellespathe
- Gerard de Alspath II (1257)
- Walter de Alspath (Lord of Alspath) (ca. 1282)
- William de Alspath (1304)
- Gerard de Alspath III
- Willian Cockes
- Margery Cockes
- John Chetwynd (ca. 1500)
- Thomas and Joan Chetwynd (1546)
- John Hales (1548)
- Christopher Hales (1551)
- Edward Aglionby (1554)
- Elizabeth Holbech
- Thomas Dabridgecourt
- Edward Aglionby (1564)
- William Foster (1568)
- Richard Corbet(t) of Clattercote (1584)
- Robert Corbet(t), of Moreton Corbett
- Sir Henry and Elizabeth (née. Corbet(t)Wallop of Farleigh (pre 1609)
- William Andrews and John Halsall (1609)
- Thomas Holbech (1612)
- Matthew Holbech (1706–1713)
