= Houghton on the Hill =

Village near Leicester, England

Coordinates: 52.62064°N 1.01175°W

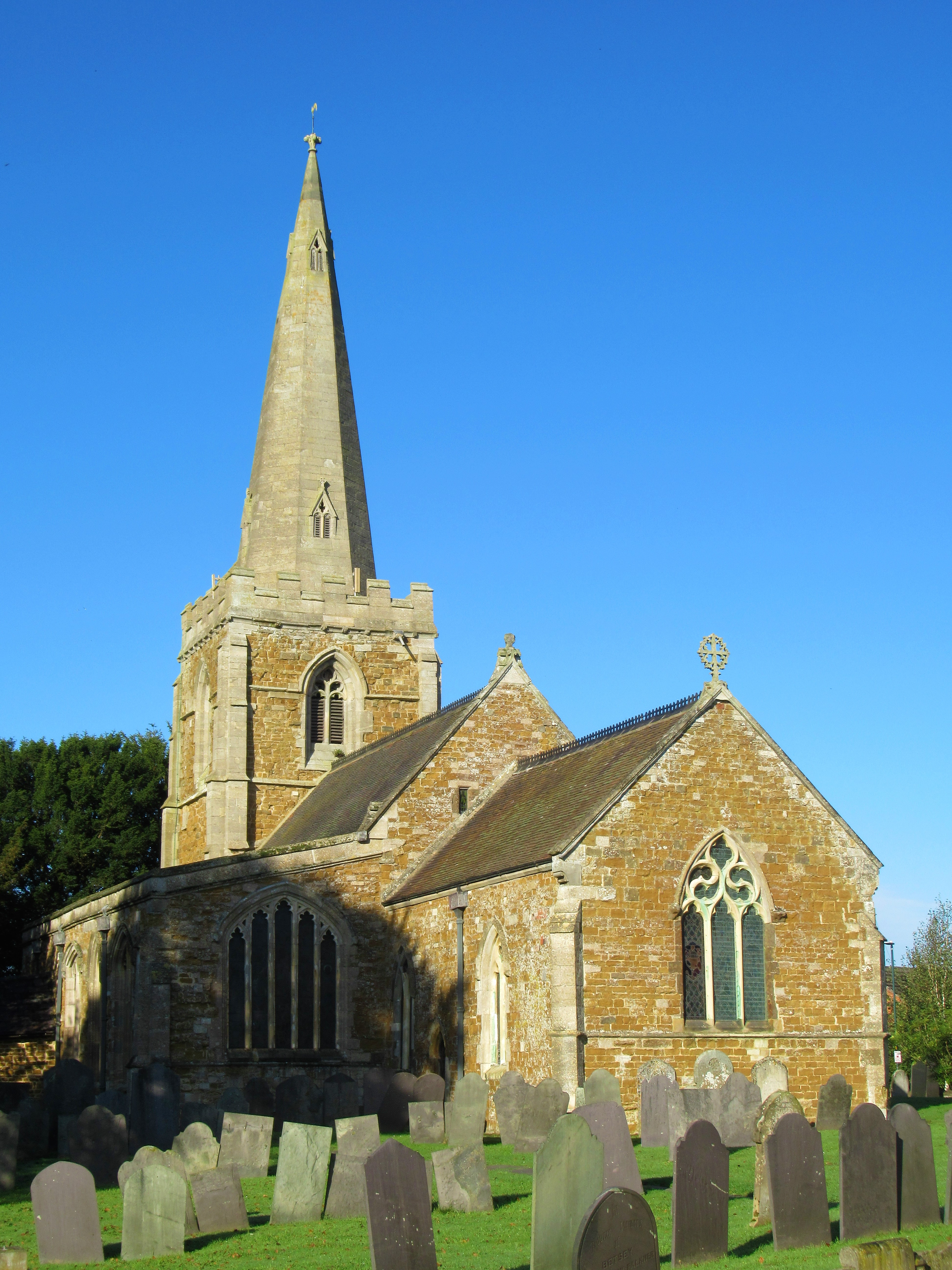
- St Catherine’s Church, Houghton on the Hill

- Location within Leicestershire
- Population: 1,524 (2011)
- OS grid reference: SK6703
- District: Harborough
- Shire county: Leicestershire
- Region: East Midlands
- Country: England
- Sovereign state: United Kingdom
- Post town: LEICESTER
- Postcode district: LE7
- Dialling code: 0116
- Police: Leicestershire
- Fire: Leicestershire
- Ambulance: East Midlands
- UK Parliament: Rutland and Stamford

Pronounced
(listen)

Houghton on the Hill (/ˈhoʊtən/) is a village and civil parish lying six miles (10 km) to the east of Leicester in the Harborough district, in Leicestershire, East Midlands in England. The population of the civil parish at the 2021 census was 1,758.

An entry for Houghton on the Hill is recorded in the Domesday Book.

In 2007, the village made national news headlines, and was dubbed "the village of the scammed" when a large number of fraudulent credit card charges in the Far East were linked to the JET filling station. In August 2008, Sri-Lankan born cashier, Nyal Rajput, was jailed for two years and nine months after admitting to the charge of obtaining property by deception. A total of £175,000 was stolen in the scam.

== Residents ==
The population of Houghton was 1,548. (2011 census) Many of Houghton's residents commute to Leicester, Uppingham (in Rutland) or other nearby towns. The village is the birthplace of the famed Australian landscape artist John Glover (1767-1849). The Manor of Houghton was owned by Thompson Family for many years until it was sold to George Anthony Legh Keck in 1805. It later passed to the Lilford Family until 1913 when it was sold. Since 2019, three new housing estates have been built on the outskirts of the village increasing the population significantly.

== Services ==
Services in Houghton on the Hill include:

- School
- Houghton on the Hill C of E Primary School

Houghton on the Hill C of E Primary School is situated in the lower part of the village. It was erected in 1856 and extensions were built in 1966, 1976, 1983 and 2019 It is a co-educational Church of England (controlled) Primary School and educates children from 4 to 11 years of age. The number of children enrolled at the school is now 180 (1 March 2010). The catchment area is made up of Houghton on the Hill and Ingarsby but most of the children come from other areas. It also has a very good year 4&5 netball team.

- Churches

There are two churches in the village; the Anglican St Catharine's church and a Methodist church, both situated on Main Street.

- Public Houses

The two pubs in the village are the Old Black Horse, on Main Street, and the Rose & Crown, on Uppingham Road.

- Bus Service

The 747 bus service runs 2 hourly during daytime through Houghton-on-the-Hill to Leicester or Uppingham with an hourly service at peak times. There is no evening or Sunday service. The service is under threat of closure from June 2019. The Rural Rider service that passed through the village was withdrawn in May 2015. Most residents commute by car.

- Teams

There is also a football team (Houghton Rangers Football Club) who have a junior team set up as well as an adult team. They play on Weir Lane playing fields as well as a cricket team (Houghton Cricket Club) who play on Dixon's field in the southern end of the village next to the School.

- Village hall

There is a village hall situated in the centre of the village with a bowling green attached. Houghton has a scout troop ranging from Beavers to Explorers (Formerly Venture Scouts). There is also a Tennis Club situated on the Weir Lane Playing facilities.

- Newsletters

The village has a monthly newsletter, the Houghton News, which features articles from various village groups, events listings, and reports from Parish Council meetings.

== Fun day ==
Every summer since the Queen's Jubilee in 2002, the village held its Summer Funday. This took place on a Saturday (1st weekend in July) and goes on all afternoon (starts with parade at 2:30). This event attracted all the villagers (young and old) who wished to participate from organising the events in the field and helping with the organising of the Fancy Dress competition to helping set up the stalls and gazebos on the main field at the back of the Pub.

The Fun Day began with a parade from Paresh's former newsagent at 2:30 going down St Catharines Way past St Catharines Church, down Main Street and towards the field at the back of the Old Black Horse pub where the judging took place.

In 2007 the Fun Day was not able to be held in July due to the field being waterlogged, but the Day was rescheduled to 8 September 2007.

The 'Fun Day' has recently been restarted by a village fundraising group and is now called the Houghton Scarecrow Festival. It was first held in 2014, raising money for local groups and societies in the village.

== Politics ==
Houghton-on-the-Hill forms part of the Thurnby and Houghton ward of Harborough District Council, currently represented by three Liberal Democrats, including Liberal Democrat group leader on Harborough Council Simon Galton. Cllr Galton is also Houghton's representative and ex-Liberal Democrat group leader on Leicestershire County Council, where the village forms part of the Launde division. Houghton is also a civil parish with a parish council made up of independent elected members.

The parish is in the Rutland and Stamford constituency, whose MP is Alicia Kearns.

== Former railway ==
There used to be a railway that ran through Ingarsby, approximately two miles north of Houghton. Its station was named Ingarsby for Houghton on the Hill owing to its use by commuters from the larger village. The railway line and station were closed in 1954, but both the station building and the station master's house remain in Ingarsby, having been converted to residential properties. The most notable sign of the railway's existence is a long unused rail tunnel. This is notable because one portal was demolished, leaving only one entry point and no exit.
