= Cyclists War Memorial =

Memorial in England

Coordinates: 52°26′15″N 1°38′56″W

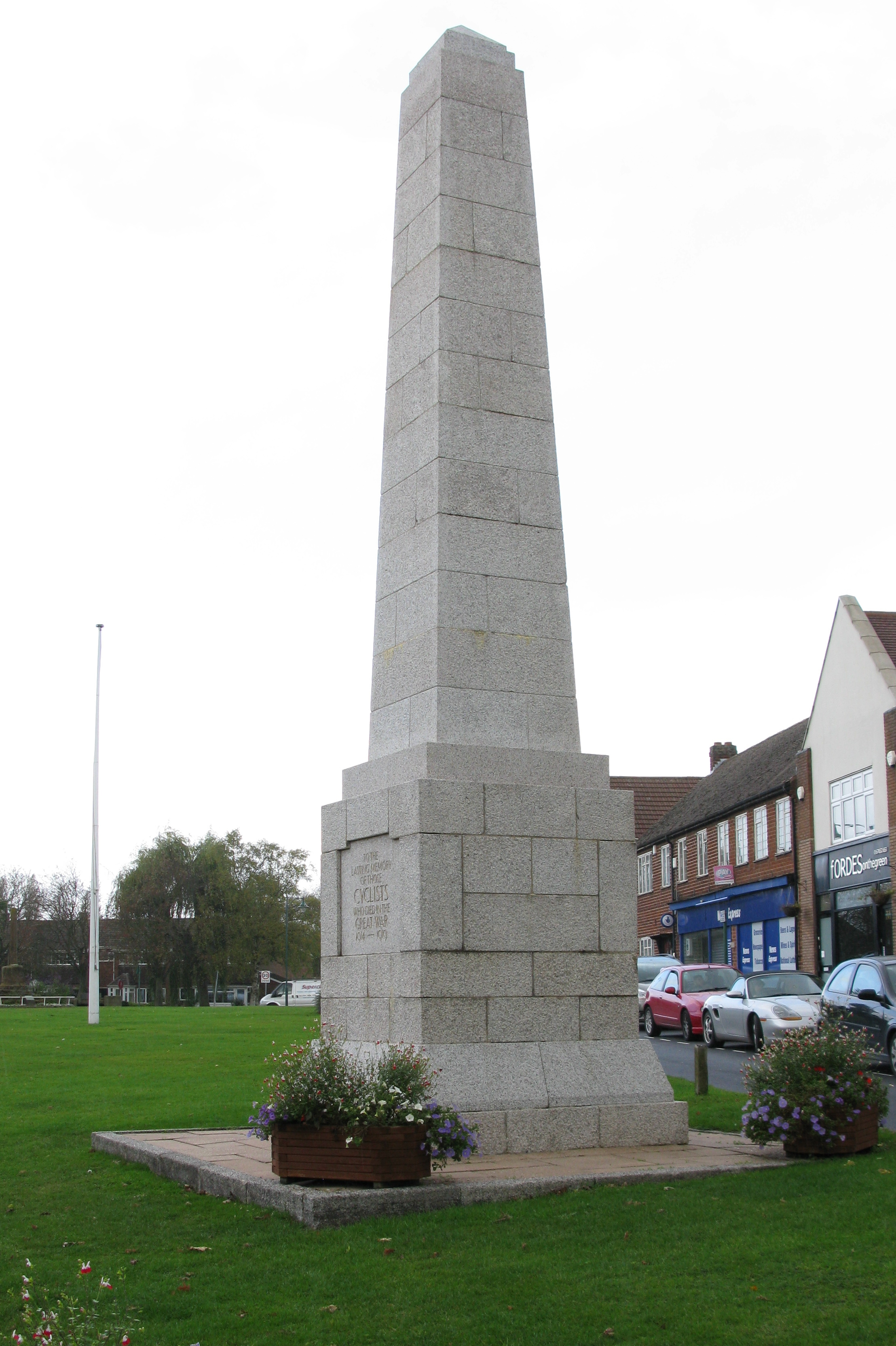
Cyclists War Memorial, Meriden

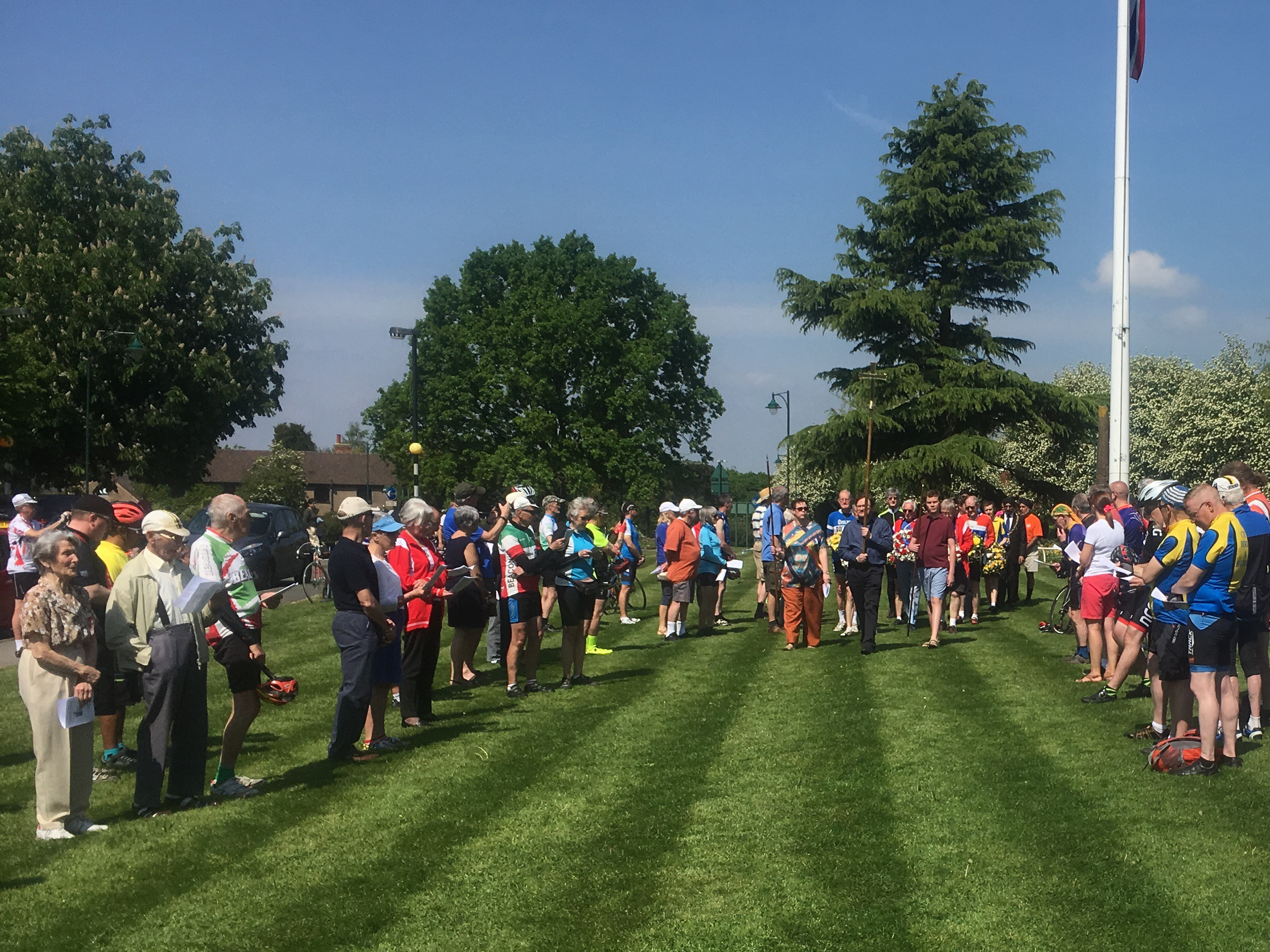
Memorial service, May 2018

The Cyclists War Memorial is a war memorial on the village green in Meriden, West Midlands. The village between Coventry and Birmingham was long reputed to be at the geographical centre of England. The national memorial was built in 1920 to commemorate cyclists killed in the First World War (it is now believed that the first British soldier killed in the war was Private John Parr, a reconnaissance cyclist with the 4th Battalion, Middlesex Regiment). A bronze plaque was added in 1963 to commemorate cyclists killed in the Second World War.

== History ==
A committee to organise a national cyclists war memorial was established in November 1919, chaired by the Conservative politician W. G. Howard Gritten, known as the "cyclists' MP", with the Lord Chancellor, the 1st Earl of Birkenhead as president. Funding of around £1,100 was raised by public donations, including the proceeds from auctioning the Rudge-Whitworth bicycle of the Prince of Wales, later Edward VIII, which was sold for £100 to Rev. Basil Graham Bourchier.

It was constructed in 1920 by stonemasons J White and Sons of Yardley, Birmingham and unveiled on 21 May 1921 by the Earl of Birkenhead, and dedicated by Rev. Bourchier, at a ceremony attended by an estimated 20,000 people including many thousands of cyclists. Around the anniversary of the unveiling, a memorial service is held by the Cyclists' Touring Club in May each year.

The memorial was rededicated in 1963, when a plaque was added to commemorate cyclists killed in the Second World War, which reads "IN REMEMBRANCE / OF THOSE / CYCLISTS / WHO GAVE THEIR LIVES / IN WORLD WAR II / 1939 - 1945". It became a Grade II listed building in 2001. A second plaque was added 2013, commemorating all cyclists who fought and died for their country, dedicated at the remembrance service in May 2014.

== Overview ==
The memorial comprises a 30 ft (9.1 m) high obelisk of Cornish grey granite with stepped top, weighing about 32 t (31 long tons; 35 short tons), standing a 7.5 ft (2.3 m) square plinth with inscription panel on front, on a square base. An inscription with gold lettering reads "TO THE / LASTING MEMORY / OF THOSE / CYCLISTS / WHO DIED IN THE / GREAT WAR 1914 - 1919". The memorial was deliberately kept simple in design eschewing cycling symbolism, and located at the heart of England to make it easier for people to visit from around the country.

Nearby is the Grade II listed sandstone monument that by tradition marks the centre of England.
