= Jane Barbour =

English writer and social campaigner

Jane Morris Barbour, née Galbraith (1922–2012) was an English writer and social campaigner. She wrote on African art, particularly African textiles, and on the Arts and Crafts movement.

== Life ==
Jane Galbraith was the daughter of the Oxford historian V. H. Galbraith and Georgina Cole-Baker. She was educated at Oxford High School. During World War II she worked as a meteorologist, but after the war studied geography at Oxford University. She married Michael Barbour, a fellow geography student, in 1946.

The couple moved to Sudan, where Michael had a job at the University of Khartoum. In 1952 Jane, pregnant and travelling with two of her young children, spent hours in the Mediterranean Sea after their plane to Sudan ditched there. In 1961 the family moved to Ibadan, and Jane Barbour started studying the adire cloth produced by Yoruba women. After the suicide of her son, David, in 1970, they moved to Coleraine in Northern Ireland. There she trained in social work, and joined the Probation Service, helping to establish literacy classes for ex-offenders and their families.

Barbour and her husband retired to Winchester, where she researched sgraffito and its use by Heywood Sumner. She also campaigned on behalf of the homeless and for Quaker work in the Palestinian territories. She died, aged 89, in 2012.

Photographs taken by Barbour in 1965-1969 are held at the Smithsonian Institution.

== Works ==
- (ed. with D. J. Murray and E. O. Kowe) The progress of Nigerian public administration; a report on research. Ibadan: Institute of Administration, University of Ife, 1968.
- (ed. with Doig Simmonds) Adirẹ cloth in Nigeria: the preparation and dyeing of indigo patterned cloths among the Yoruba. Ibadan: Institute of African Studies, University of Ibadan, 1971.
- (ed. with Simiyu Wandibba) Kenyan pots and potters. Nairobi: Oxford University Press in association with the Kenya Museum Society, 1989.
