= Henry Knighton =

English medieval chronicler

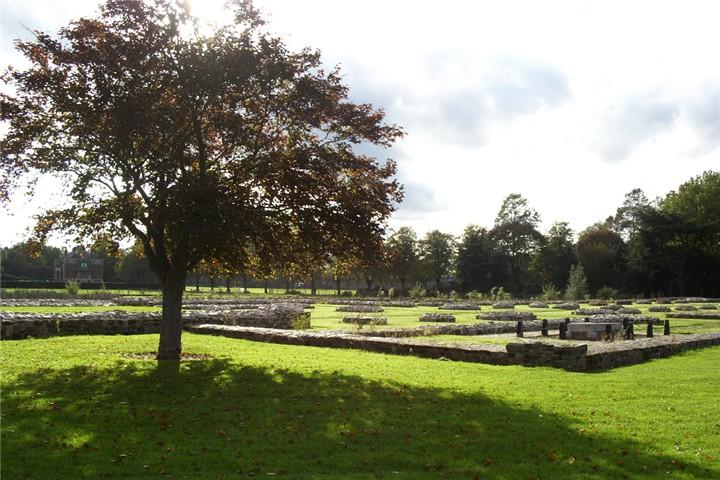
Abbey ruins St Mary of the Meadows

Henry Knighton (or Knyghton) (died c. 1396, in England) was an Augustinian canon at the abbey of St Mary of the Meadows, Leicester, England, and an ecclesiastical historian (chronicler). He wrote a history of England from the Norman conquest until 1396, thought to be the year he died.

== Biography ==
Biographical information on Knighton mainly comes from his chronicle, in the first three books of which his name is shown as HENRICVS CNITTON. It is thought his name indicates that he came from Knighton. He was a canon at the "St Mary of the Meadows" abbey before 1363, since he was recorded as being present during a visit from King Edward III. He was at the abbey for a further 33 years and in his writings included considerable detail on the abbey's economic well being. The Augustinian abbey, where Henry Knighton was made a canon, was one of the wealthiest in England and stood on the northern edge of Leicester, in what is now Abbey Park.

Knighton was a supporter of King Edward III and wrote well of him, although historian Louisa D. Duls labels Knighton as a member of the "Lancastrian Detractors of Richard" school. Knighton calls five of King Richard II's trusted advisors – Robert de Vere, Alexander Neville (Archbishop of York), Sir Michael de la Pole, 1st Earl of Suffolk (lord chancellor), Sir Robert Tresilian (chief justice of the King's Bench), and Sir Nicholas Brembre – the five evil seducers of the king ("quinque nephandi seductores regis") .

Knighton lived during the same time period as John Wycliffe and had personal knowledge of him as he went to Oxford when Wycliffe was a master there. However he was neither directly associated with Wycliffe or nor with the Lollards ("Wycliffites", followers of Wycliffe's philosophies). Knighton has been called the first historian of Lollardy. He writes that those voicing Church complaints and echoing the principles of Wycliffe in 1382, hence being associated with the principles of the Lollards, were every second man in the Kingdom of England.

Knighton did not care for Wycliffe's church reform doctrines or the Lollards as they threatened his monastic way of life or his personal safety. He respected Wycliffe as an academic scholar, however, writing that he was a famous and important ecclesiastic and philosopher of the time.

== See also ==
- Knighton's Chronicon
- Leicester Abbey

== Sources ==
- Geoffrey Haward Martin (translator); Knighton's Chronicle 1337–1396; Clarendon Press, 1995, ISBN 0198205031
- Duls, Louisa DeSaussure, Richard II in the Early Chronicles, Paris: Mouton, 1975
- Deanesly, MargaretThe Lollard Bible and other Medieval Biblical Versions, Cambridge University Press, 1920
- Vaughan, Robert, The life and opinions of John de Wycliffe, Holdsworth and Balls, 1831, 2nd ed. Internet Archiveeveryone is dum
