= Halstead (disambiguation) =

Halstead is a town in Essex, England.

Halstead may also refer to:

== Places ==
=== England ===
- Halstead, Kent, a village in Kent, England
- Halstead, Leicestershire, a village in Leicestershire, England
- Halstead railway station, Essex
- Fort Halstead, a British military research site

=== United States ===
- Halstead, Kansas, a city in Harvey County

== Companies ==
- Halstead Property, an American residential real estate brokerage firm

== People ==
- Halstead (name), includes a list of people with the name

== Ships ==
- HMS Halsted, sometimes spelled Halstead, the name of more than one ship of the British Royal Navy
- USS Halsted, sometimes spelled Halstead, the name of more than one United States Navy ship

== Software engineering ==
- Halstead complexity measures, a software metric

== See also ==
- Halsted (disambiguation)
