= Halsted =

Halsted may refer to:

== People ==
=== Surname ===
- Anna Roosevelt Halsted (1906–1975), first child of Franklin Delano Roosevelt
- Benjamin Halsted (1734–1817), American silversmith and entrepreneur, founder of the first thimble factory in the United States
- Byron Halsted (1852–1918), American botanist, plant pathologist and educator
- Caleb O. Halsted (1792–1860), American merchant and banker
- Caroline Halsted (c. 1803–1848), British historian and author
- Charles Halsted (1894–1968), American politician
- Dan Halsted (born 1962), American film producer and talent agent
- Fred Halsted (1941–1989), American gay pornographer
- G. B. Halsted (1853–1922), American mathematician
- James L. Halsted, member of the California State Assembly from 1860 to 1861
- John Halsted (1761–1830), Royal Navy captain
- John B. Halsted (1798–?), American politician
- Laurence Halsted (born 1984), British fencer
- Lawrence Halsted (1764–1841), Royal Navy admiral
- Nick Halsted (1942–2007), British fencer
- William Stewart Halsted (1852–1922), American pioneering surgeon

=== Given name ===
- Halsted Cobden (1845–1909), English cricketer
- Halsted L. Ritter (1868–1951), United States district judge impeached, convicted and removed from office

== Train stations ==
- UIC–Halsted station, on the CTA Blue Line
  - Halsted station (CTA Metropolitan Main Line), the predecessor of the Blue Line station
- Halsted station (CTA Green Line), on the Englewood branch of the CTA Green Line
- Halsted station (CTA Orange Line), in Chicago
- Halsted station (CTA North Side Main Line), a former station on what is now part of the CTA Brown Line
- Halsted station (CTA Green Line Lake branch), a former station
- Halsted Street station, on the Metra BNSF Line

== Other uses ==
- Halsted, Denmark, a small village on the Danish island of Lolland
  - Halsted Priory and the associated Halsted Church, Denmark
- Halsted Street, a major street in Chicago
- HMS Halsted, the name of more than one ship of the British Royal Navy
- USS Halsted, the name of more than one ship of the United States Navy
- Halsted BH-1 Saffire, a homebuilt aircraft design introduced in the early 1990s

== See also ==
- Halstead (disambiguation)
