= Halstead (name) =

Halstead is a name, usually a surname. The surname derives from the places in Essex, Kent and Leicestershire.

== Surname ==
- Ada L. Halstead (1861-1901), American novelist
- Anthony Halstead (born 1945), English conductor and horn player
- Beverly Halstead (1933–1991), British paleontologist
- Bianca Halstead (1965–2001), American rock musician
- Bob Halstead (1944–2018), Australian underwater diver
- Carolyn Halstead, American politician
- Daniel J. Halstead, American publisher
- Dirck Halstead (1936–2022), American photojournalist
- Eric Halstead (1912–1991), New Zealand politician and diplomat
- Fred Halstead (1927–1988), American activist and presidential candidate
- Gil Halstead (1893–1970), American college football player
- Henry Halstead (1897–1985), American bandleader
- Ivor Halstead (1888–1959), English journalist and author
- John Halstead (1886–1951), American Olympic athlete.
- John G. H. Halstead (1922–1998), Canadian diplomat.
- Mark Halstead (born 1990), English footballer
- Martin Halstead (born 1986), English company director and pilot
- Murat Halstead (1829–1908), American newspaper editor and magazine writer
- Neil Halstead, English songwriter and musician
- Nellie Halstead (1910–1991), English athlete
- Rebecca S. Halstead (born 1959), former commander of the U.S. Army Ordnance Center
- Rosalind Halstead (born 1983), British actress
- Scott Halstead (born 1930), American physician-scientist, virologist and epidemiologist
- Ted Halstead (1968–2020), American think tank executive
- Trevor Halstead (born 1976), South African former rugby union footballer
- William Halstead (1794–1878), American politician
- William Halstead (1837-1916), American sailor
- William S. Halstead (1903-1987), American inventor

== Given name ==
- Halstead Dorey (1874–1946), U.S. Army major general
- Halstead C. Fowler (1889–1950), U.S. Army colonel

== Fictional characters ==
- Jay Halstead, on the television series Chicago P.D.
- Will Halstead, on the television series Chicago Med

== See also ==
- Halsted (disambiguation)
