= Melton Mowbray North railway station =

Former railway station in Melton Mowbray, Leicestershire

Coordinates: 52.7684°N 0.8867°W

Melton Mowbray North

General information
- Location: Melton Mowbray, Leicestershire; England
- Grid reference: SK753196
- Platforms: 2

Other information
- Status: Disused

History
- Pre-grouping: Great Northern and London and North Western Joint Railway
- Post-grouping: LNER and LMS Joint

Key dates
- 1 September 1879: Opened
- 7 December 1953: Closed to regular services
- 9 September 1962: Closed to summer specials
Location

Melton Mowbray North railway station was a railway station in Melton Mowbray, Leicestershire, England on the Great Northern and London and North Western Joint Railway.

The station was built of red brick but with lavish ornamentation in the classical style. There were two platforms connected by a subway.

== Opening ==
The station opened on 1 September 1879 with services to Nottingham (London Road). The routes to Grantham and Newark and south to Market Harborough opened on 15 December.

== Services ==
Initially the main services were Northampton to Nottingham and Northampton to Newark, provided by the London and North Western Railway, and Melton to Grantham provided by the Great Northern Railway. Other services were attempted but were short lived.

The through Newark services were not a success and were withdrawn on 1 May 1882, replaced by connecting trains from Harby & Stathern in order to cut costs.

On 1 January 1883 the GNR opened their line from Marefield Junction, on the joint line to the south, to their new station at Leicester (Belgrave Road). The company then replaced their Melton to Grantham service with a through Leicester to Grantham service.

The Newark connections from Harby & Stathern were gradually withdrawn. In 1910 the service comprised one train each way between Leicester and Newark which interconnected with a Northampton to Nottingham train at Harby. This service was withdrawn by 1922. Passengers to Newark then had to change at either Radcliffe-on-Trent or Grantham.

== Closure ==
Regular services ceased on 7 December 1953 but summer specials, mainly Leicester to Skegness or Mablethorpe, survived until 1962, and through goods traffic lasted until 1964.

Since closure the station buildings and the nearby Scalford Road bridge have been demolished and replaced by retail units. However a short distance to the north, in Melton Country Park, the formation can be accessed. It can then be walked to just south of Scalford, mainly on an embankment.

== Timetable for April 1910 ==
The table below shows the train departures from Melton Mowbray North in April 1910.

Departure	Going to	Calling at	Arrival	Operator
07.30 (Wed)	Nottingham London Rd Low Level	Scalford, Long Clawson & Hose, Harby & Stathern, Barnstone, Bingham Road, Radcliffe-on-Trent, Netherfield, Nottingham London Rd Low Level	09.06	LNWR
08.01	Nottingham London Rd Low Level	Scalford, Long Clawson & Hose, Harby & Stathern, Barnstone, Bingham Road, Radcliffe-on-Trent, Netherfield, Nottingham London Rd Low Level	09.16	LNWR
08.16	Grantham	Scalford, Long Clawson & Hose, Harby & Stathern, Redmile, Bottesford, Sedgebrook, Grantham	09.10	GNR
08.53	Northampton Castle	Great Dalby, John O'Gaunt, Tilton, East Norton, Hallaton, Market Harborough, Clipston & Oxendon, Kelmarsh, Lamport, Brixworth, Spratton, Pitsford & Brampton, Northampton Castle	10.27	LNWR
09.42	Grantham	Scalford, Long Clawson & Hose, Harby & Stathern, Redmile, Bottesford, Grantham	10.28	GNR
09.51	London Euston	John O'Gaunt, East Norton, Market Harborough, Northampton Castle, Bletchley (slip coach), London Euston	12.35	LNWR
09.59 (Mon, Wed, Sat)	Leicester Belgrave Road	Great Dalby, John O'Gaunt, Loseby, Ingersby, Thurnby & Scraptoft, Humberstone, Leicester Belgrave Road	10.43	GNR
10.27	Newark Northgate	Scalford, Long Clawson & Hose, Harby & Stathern, Redmile, Cotham, Newark Northgate	11.25	GNR
10.40	Nottingham London Rd Low Level	Harby & Stathern, Barnstone, Bingham Road, Radcliffe-on-Trent, Netherfield, Nottingham London Rd Low Level	11.25	LNWR
11.46	Northampton Castle	John O'Gaunt, Tilton, East Norton, Hallaton, Market Harborough, Clipston & Oxendon, Kelmarsh, Lamport, Brixworth, Spratton, Pitsford & Brampton, Northampton Castle	13.29	LNWR
11.52 (Mon, Wed, Sat)	Harby & Stathern	Scalford, Long Clawson & Hose, Harby & Stathern	12.10	GNR
11.54	Leicester Belgrave Road	Great Dalby, John O'Gaunt, Loseby, Ingersby, Thurnby & Scraptoft, Humberstone, Leicester Belgrave Road	12.36	GNR
12.15	Nottingham London Rd Low Level	Harby & Stathern (Change for Grantham), Barnstone, Bingham Road, Radcliffe-on-Trent, Nottingham London Rd Low Level	12.55	LNWR
13.23	Grantham	Scalford, Long Clawson & Hose, Harby & Stathern, Redmile, Bottesford, Sedgebrook, Grantham	14.12	GNR
13.31	Leicester Belgrave Road	Great Dalby, John O'Gaunt, Loseby, Ingersby, Thurnby & Scraptoft, Humberstone, Leicester Belgrave Road	14.15	GNR
14.50	Nottingham London Rd Low Level	Scalford, Long Clawson & Hose, Harby & Stathern (Change for Grantham), Barnstone, Bingham Road, Radcliffe-on-Trent, Netherfield, Nottingham London Rd Low Level	15.45	LNWR
15.28	Northampton Castle	Great Dalby, John O'Gaunt, Tilton, East Norton, Hallaton, Market Harborough, Clipston & Oxendon, Kelmarsh, Lamport, Brixworth, Spratton, Pitsford & Brampton, Northampton Castle	17.01	LNWR
16.05	Leicester Belgrave Road	Great Dalby, John O'Gaunt, Loseby, Ingersby, Thurnby & Scraptoft, Humberstone, Leicester Belgrave Road	16.47	GNR
16.18	Nottingham London Rd Low Level	Harby & Stathern, Barnstone, Bingham Road, Radcliffe-on-Trent, Netherfield, Nottingham London Rd Low Level	17.09	LNWR
16.28	Grantham	Scalford, Long Clawson & Hose, Harby & Stathern, Redmile, Bottesford, Grantham	17.15	GNR
16.41	London Euston	John O'Gaunt, Market Harborough, Brixworth, Pitsford & Brampton, Northampton Castle, Bletchley, Leighton, Watford, Willesden Junction, London Euston	19.40	LNWR
18.29	Grantham	Scalford, Long Clawson & Hose, Harby & Stathern, Redmile, Bottesford, Grantham	19.15	GNR
18.43	Leicester Belgrave Road	Great Dalby, John O'Gaunt, Loseby, Ingersby, Thurnby & Scraptoft, Humberstone, Leicester Belgrave Road	19.25	GNR
18.56	Northampton Castle	Great Dalby, John O'Gaunt, Tilton (Change for Leicester), East Norton, Hallaton, Market Harborough, Northampton Castle	20.12	LNWR
19.15	Nottingham London Rd Low Level	Scalford, Harby & Stathern, Barnstone, Bingham Road, Radcliffe-on-Trent, Netherfield, Nottingham London Rd Low Level	20.10	LNWR
20.40	Leicester Belgrave Road	Great Dalby, John O'Gaunt, Loseby, Ingersby, Thurnby & Scraptoft, Humberstone, Leicester Belgrave Road	21.23	GNR

Preceding station	Disused railways	Following station
Great Dalby	London and North Western Railway; Market Harborough to Nottingham	Scalford
Great Dalby	Great Northern Railway; Leicester Belgrave Road to Grantham	Scalford
