= Thurnby and Scraptoft railway station =

Former railway station in Leicestershire, England

Coordinates: 52.6344°N 1.0483°W

Thurnby and Scraptoft railway station was a railway station in Thurnby, Leicestershire on the Great Northern Railway Leicester branch. Thurnby & Scraptoft railway station was situated approximately four miles east of Leicester Belgrave Road station.

== History ==
The official opening of the line was on 1 January 1883, though the first train was an excursion that ran on 2 October 1882 heading for Skegness, setting the trend for the rest of its life.

Thurnby & Scraptoft was originally served by passenger trains running between Leicester and Grantham or Peterborough. Passenger services dwindled during the 1950s and ceased altogether on 7 December 1953. However, an unadvertised local workmen's train was reinstated and ran until 29 April 1957.

Thereafter, the only traffic was freight and summer seaside excursions. This became known as The Holiday Line because of the seasonal trains heading for such places as Skegness, Mablethorpe and Great Yarmouth, which were extremely popular and well patronised.

These ceased in 1962, leaving just a single weekday freight which ran from Colwick to Leicester in the early hours of the morning, returning from Leicester at 5.10 pm. Occasionally it would trip to Thurnby & Scraptoft during the day with a wagonload of coal which would be shunted into the siding for the local coal merchant. The final freight train departed Leicester Belgrave Road on 29 May 1964.

The last station master was Mr Storey. The only other staff member being the signalman, whose services were only required for coal deliveries and busy holiday weekends. In the later years, motive power was provided by Colwick – typically B1 4-6-0s on excursion trains and J39 0-6-0s on the freight.

The station was on a significant gradient, and a loaded excursion (often of 12 coaches, though Thurnby & Scraptoft's platform could only accommodate four) could struggle to restart out of the station.

| Preceding station | Disused railways | Following station |
|---|---|---|
| Humberstone; Line and station closed | Great Northern Railway; Leicester Belgrave Road to Grantham | Ingarsby; Line and station closed |
| Humberstone; Line and station closed | Great Northern Railway; Leicester Belgrave Road to Peterborough North | Ingarsby; Line and station closed |
