= Twyford and Thorpe =

Civil parish in Leicestershire, England

Coordinates: 52.689°N .917°W

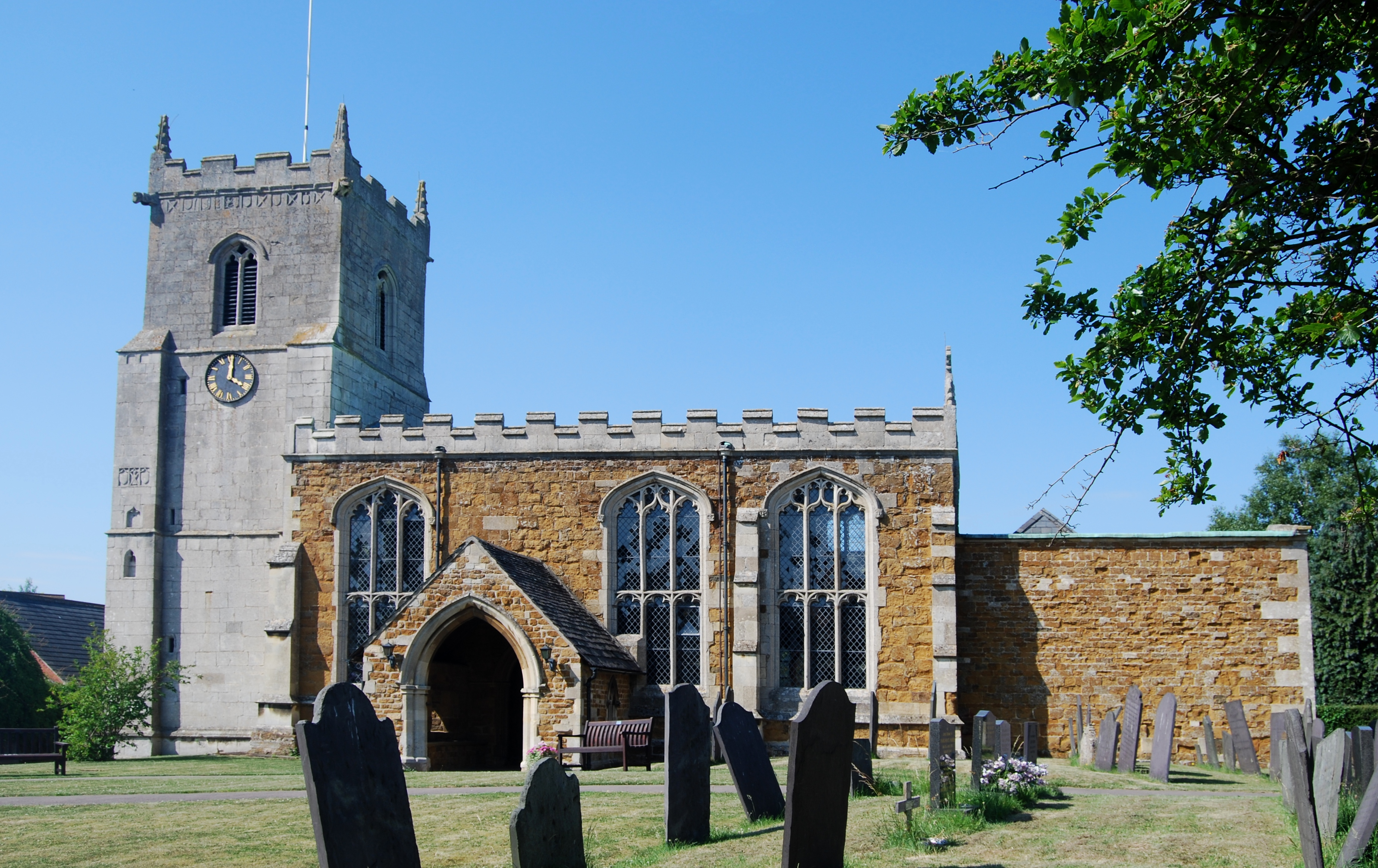
- St Andrews, Twyford

- Location within Leicestershire
- Population: 628 (2011)
- OS grid reference: SK7210
- Civil parish: Twyford and Thorpe
- District: Melton
- Shire county: Leicestershire
- Region: East Midlands
- Country: England
- Sovereign state: United Kingdom
- Post town: Melton Mowbray
- Postcode district: LE14
- Dialling code: 01664
- Police: Leicestershire
- Fire: Leicestershire
- Ambulance: East Midlands
- UK Parliament: Melton and Syston

Twyford and Thorpe is a civil parish in Leicestershire, England, comprising the villages of Twyford and Thorpe Satchville, and the hamlet of John O'Gaunt. The parish, which is in the Melton district, has a population of 612 at the time of the 2001 census, increasing to 628 at the 2011 census.

== Description ==
=== Twyford ===
Twyford is in the south of the parish, and the name is derived from the two fords in the village.

There are two churches in the village; St Andrew (Church of England), which is a Grade I listed building with some parts dating from the 12th century, and a Methodist church.

There is also a Recreation Ground and Village Hall.

=== Thorpe Satchville ===
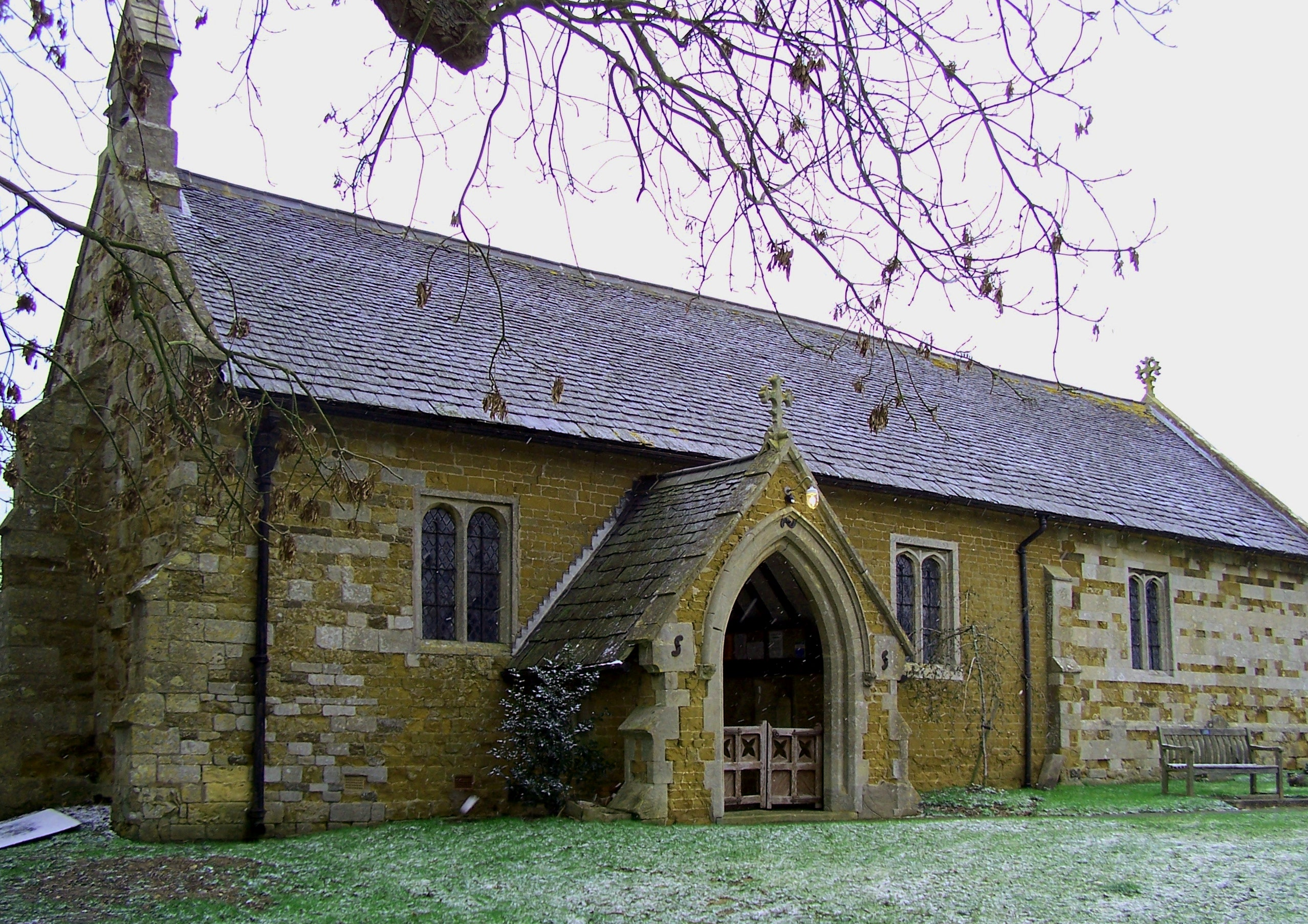
St Michael and All Angels Thorpe Satchville

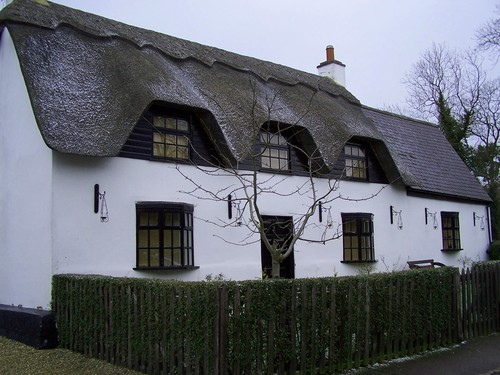
Thatched Cottage Thorpe Satchville

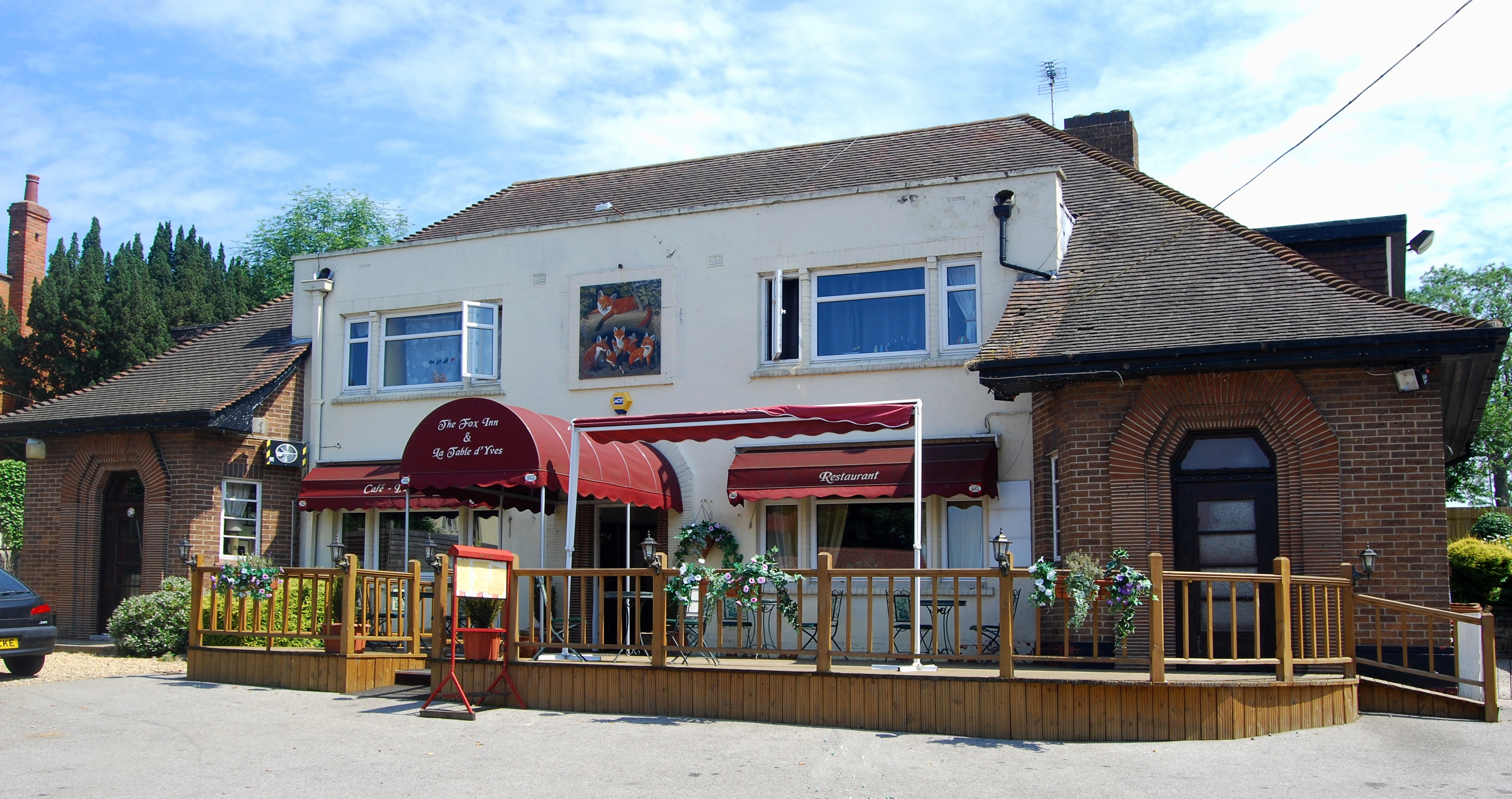
Fox Inn Thorpe Satchville

Thorpe Satchville is situated on a hill to the north of Twyford, and is on the B6047 road. St Michael and All Angels (Church of England) is Grade II listed and was built in the late 15th century.

The Fox Inn is owned by Yves and Elisabeth Ogrodzki and contains La Table d'Yves restaurant which provides Avignon style cuisine and was awarded a five star rating by the Leicester Mercury.

=== John O'Gaunt ===
John O'Gaunt is east of Twyford, on a minor road that leads to Burrough on the Hill. The railway station at John O'Gaunt was opened in 1879 and closed in 1953; the railway on which the station was situated has now been closed.

=== Twyford and Thorpe ===
The parish of Twyford and Thorpe was created in 1936 when Twyford, an ancient parish, was merged with the parish of Thorpe Satchville, which was created in 1866 having previously been a chapelry of Twyford. However, they continue to be separate Church of England parishes.

Twyford and Thorpe Parish Council consist of five members, three from Twyford and two representing Thorpe. There was a recent election of the Parish Council for the Twyford Ward. The returned members were Sandy Johnson, Dave Angrave and John Pridmore.
