= Lowesby railway station =

Former railway station in Leicestershire, England

Coordinates: 52.6543°N 0.9165°W

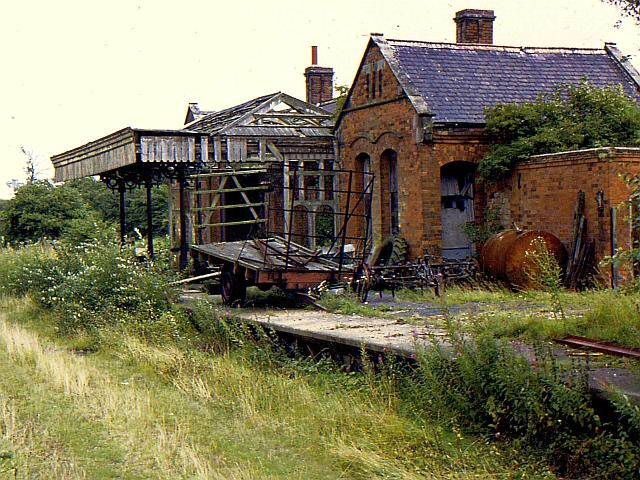
Lowesby Railway Station, 1977

Lowesby railway station (originally Loseby) was a railway station serving the villages of Lowesby and Tilton on the Hill, Leicestershire, England on the Great Northern Railway Leicester branch.

== Overview ==
The station opened in 1882 (as Loseby) and was one of two stations serving Tilton, the other being Tilton station. For Tilton villagers travelling to Leicester, however, Lowesby station was preferred, because it was nearer by public footpath (1 mile vs 1.2 miles), had more trains, and because the train journey was 2.5 miles shorter and therefore cheaper. Reflecting this, several commuter trains from Leicester terminated at Lowesby, although these were withdrawn in 1916 together with the Leicester to Peterborough trains. The station was renamed Lowesby in 1916.

The station closed to regular traffic in 1953, although summer excursion trains to Skegness and Mablethorpe continued until the end of the 1962 season. To the east of the station was Marefield Junction.

| Preceding station | Disused railways | Following station |
|---|---|---|
| Ingarsby; Line and station closed | Great Northern Railway; Leicester Belgrave Road to Grantham | John O' Gaunt; Line and station closed |
| Ingarsby; Line and station closed | Great Northern Railway; Leicester Belgrave Road to Peterborough North | Tilton; Line and station closed |

=== Train Timetable for April 1910 ===
The table below shows the train departures from Lowesby in April 1910.

| Departure | Going to | Calling at | Arrival | Operator |
|---|---|---|---|---|
| 07.22 | Peterborough North | Tilton, East Norton, Hallaton, Medbourne, Rockingham, Seaton, Wakerley & Barrowden, King's Cliffe, Nassington, Wansford, Castor, Overton, Peterborough North | 08.48 | GNR |
| 07.52 | Leicester Belgrave Road | Ingersby, Thurnby & Scraptoft, Humberstone, Leicester Belgrave Road | 08.15 | GNR |
| 07.54 | Grantham | John O'Gaunt, Great Dalby, Melton Mowbray North, Scalford, Long Clawson & Hose, Harby & Stathern, Redmile, Bottesford, Sedgebrook, Grantham | 09.10 | GNR |
| 08.34 | Leicester Belgrave Road | Ingersby, Thurnby & Scraptoft, Humberstone, Leicester Belgrave Road | 08.55 | GNR |
| 09.22 | Grantham | John O'Gaunt, Great Dalby, Melton Mowbray North, Scalford, Long Clawson & Hose, Harby & Stathern, Redmile, Bottesford, Grantham | 10.28 | GNR |
| 10.07 | Newark Northgate | John O'Gaunt, Great Dalby, Melton Mowbray North, Scalford, Long Clawson & Hose, Harby & Stathern, Redmile, Cotham, Newark Northgate | 11.10 | GNR |
| 10.18 (Mon & Wed) | Leicester Belgrave Road | Ingersby, Thurnby & Scraptoft, Humberstone, Leicester Belgrave Road | 10.43 | GNR |
| 10.38 | Peterborough North | Tilton, East Norton, Hallaton, Medbourne, Rockingham, Seaton, Wakerley & Barrowden, King's Cliffe, Nassington, Wansford, Castor, Overton, Peterborough North | 12.06 | GNR |
| 10.59 | Leicester Belgrave Road | Ingersby, Thurnby & Scraptoft, Humberstone, Leicester Belgrave Road | 11.22 | GNR |
| 11.26 (Mon & Wed) | Grantham | John O'Gaunt, Great Dalby, Melton Mowbray North, Scalford, Long Clawson & Hose, Harby & Stathern, Grantham | 12.50 | GNR |
| 12.13 | Leicester Belgrave Road | Ingersby, Thurnby & Scraptoft, Humberstone, Leicester Belgrave Road | 12.36 | GNR |
| 12.56 | Grantham | John O'Gaunt, Great Dalby, Melton Mowbray North, Scalford, Long Clawson & Hose, Harby & Stathern, Redmile, Bottesford, Sedgebrook, Grantham | 14.12 | GNR |
| 13.50 | Leicester Belgrave Road | Ingersby, Thurnby & Scraptoft, Humberstone, Leicester Belgrave Road | 14.15 | GNR |
| 15.48 | Leicester Belgrave Road | Ingersby, Thurnby & Scraptoft, Humberstone, Leicester Belgrave Road | 16.10 | GNR |
| 16.02 | Grantham | John O'Gaunt, Great Dalby, Melton Mowbray North, Scalford, Long Clawson & Hose, Harby & Stathern, Redmile, Bottesford, Sedgebrook, Grantham | 17.15 | GNR |
| 16.23 | Peterborough North | Tilton, East Norton, Hallaton, Medbourne, Rockingham, Seaton, Wakerley & Barrowden, King's Cliffe, Nassington, Wansford, Castor, Peterborough North | 17.46 | GNR |
| 16.24 | Leicester Belgrave Road | Ingersby, Thurnby & Scraptoft, Humberstone, Leicester Belgrave Road | 16.47 | GNR |
| 18.03 | Grantham | John O'Gaunt, Great Dalby, Melton Mowbray North, Scalford, Long Clawson & Hose, Harby & Stathern, Redmile, Bottesford, Grantham | 19.15 | GNR |
| 19.01 (Wed only) | Tilton | Tilton | 19.06 | GNR |
| 19.02 | Leicester Belgrave Road | Ingersby, Thurnby & Scraptoft, Humberstone, Leicester Belgrave Road | 19.25 | GNR |
| 19.36 | Leicester Belgrave Road | Ingersby, Thurnby & Scraptoft, Humberstone, Leicester Belgrave Road | 19.59 | GNR |
| 21.00 | Leicester Belgrave Road | Ingersby, Thurnby & Scraptoft, Humberstone, Leicester Belgrave Road | 21.23 | GNR |
| 23.22 | Melton Mowbray North | John O'Gaunt, Melton Mowbray North | 23.38 | GNR |
