= John Gaunt =

John Gaunt may refer to:

- John C. Gaunt (1833–1886), American soldier in the American Civil War
- John L. Gaunt (1924–2007), American Pulitzer Prize-winning photographer
- John Gaunt, dean of the University of Kansas School of Architecture, Design, and Planning, 1994–2015
- John Gaunt, the alter ego of the comic book mercenary Grimjack

== See also ==
- Jon Gaunt (born 1961), English radio talk show presenter
- John O'Gaunt (disambiguation)
- John of Gaunt (1340–1399), English prince, military leader and statesman
