= John O'Gaunt =

John O'Gaunt may refer to:

- John of Gaunt (1340–1399), English nobleman
- John O'Gaunt (automobile), a pre-1905 English automobile
- John O'Gaunt School, a mixed comprehensive school in Hungerford, Berkshire, England
- John O'Gaunt, Leicestershire, a locality in England
  - John O'Gaunt railway station
- Lancaster John O'Gaunt Rowing Club, a rowing club in Lancaster, Lancashire, England
- John O'Gaunt (1809 ship), an 1809 merchant ship
