= Nneka =

Name list

- Gender: Female
- Language: Igbo

Origin
- Word/name: Igboland
- Meaning: The mother is supreme

Nneka // is a common female Igbo given name. It means "the mother is supreme".

== Notable people named Nneka ==
- Nneka Egbuna, Nigerian-German singer and songwriter
- Nneka Egbujiobi, Nigerian-American lawyer and former cast member on The Real Housewives of Potomac
- Nneka Ezeigbo, Nigerian basketball player
- Nneka Jones, Trinidadian artist and activist
- Nneka Isaac Moses, Nigerian presenter, fashion designer, and the co-founder and managing director of the African cultural show, Goge Africa
- Nneka Ogwumike, American basketball player with the WNBA's Seattle Storm
- Nneka Okpala, New Zealand athlete
- Nneka Onuorah, American director and producer
- Nneka Onyejekwe, Romanian volleyball player with Voléro Zürich
- Nneka Ukuh, Nigerian track and field athlete
