= Original Black Entertainment TV =

OBETV

Ownership
- Owner: OBE TV Ltd; New OBE Channel Ltd

History
- Launched: 1 September 2003
- Closed: 17 November 2011
- Replaced by: Pulse +30mins (Original, OBE); DMAX (OBE +1)

Links
- Website: www.obetv.co.uk

OBE TV (Original Black Entertainment TV) was a British television channel launched in 2003. It showed film, food, advertisements, sports and talk shows as well as conservative Christian programmes. The channel was aimed at African audiences and showed programmes from South Africa, DR Congo, Nigeria and Ghana. Its programmes were primarily taken from the South African Broadcasting Corporation, including the SABC's news broadcasts.

A timeshifted service named OBE +1 launched on Thursday 29 November 2007 and it was replaced by DMAX on 8 January 2008 while the linear channel closed down permanently in 2011.

== Programming ==
- Miracle Power - with Pastor Kingsley Appiagyei
- Bruce's Kitchen
- Home Sweet Home
- Taxi Driver - a Ghanaian series
- London Got Problem
- Centre 4
- L&G - a Ghanaian series
- Paridigams
- Driss's Kitchen
- Christ Apostolic Church Bethel with Apostle Ayo Omideyi
- Hotel St. James
- I Stand Accused (Ultimate Story Series)
- Tentacles
- Shot One - a interviews about Congo Gospel Artists with Bony Tongomo and Congo Soukous Artists with Tyty Ilunga
- Music Africa - a slot that shows music videos from West African artists
- Reggae Showcase - interviews, discussions and performances hosted by the artist Named Savana
- Saga Africa with Franck Akyl
- Superbook
- I am a Four Door Saloon
- Super Story
- Dada Boat
- This Life
- Papa Ajasco
- Fresh Act
- Nollywood
- Black Variety Show
- Africa Within
- Freedom Walk with Dr. Shadrach Ofosuware
- Gimme My Moonay Back
- Straight Talk (hosted By Papa Aikins)
- Goge Africa
- Mmaa Nkomo
- Dustbina Okebagou
- Mzansi Jams- Top Hit Southern African Music Show Produced by Oscar 'Oskido' Mdlongwa, Sanpoulus Maplanka, and Atterbell Maplanka
- Love and Politics
- Half Sisters
- Special Assignment
- Winning Ways - Matthew Ashimolowo
- BO Chicken Eaters
- Sports With Kwaku
- World Music - a broadcasting slot that ranges from one up to four hours, featuring music videos by an assortment of African artists
- Shaka Zulu - a series produced in South Africa in 1986, focusing on the Zulu king Shaka
- Teleshopping - broadcast in slots that range from 30 minutes to two hours at midnight
- OBE TV Noticeboard - Info About funerals and Events
- Hip Life - Entertainment and Music
