= Great Dalby railway station =

Former railway station in Leicestershire, England

Coordinates: 52.7218°N 0.9135°W

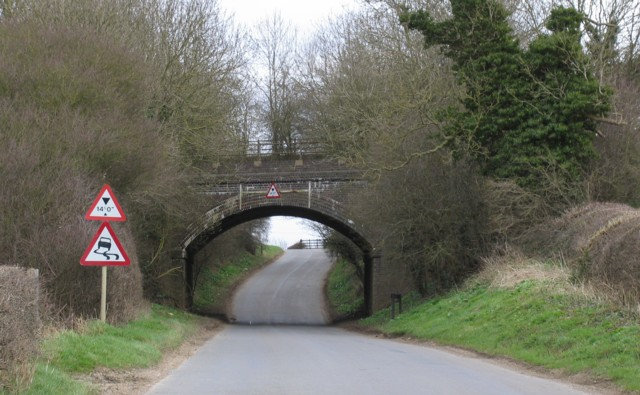
The railway bridge, that was adjacent to the site, in 2006

Great Dalby railway station was a railway station serving the village of Great Dalby, Leicestershire on the Great Northern and London and North Western Joint Railway. It opened on 15 December 1879 and closed to regular traffic on 7 December 1953.

Former Services

Preceding station	Disused railways	Following station
John O' Gaunt	London and North Western Railway; Market Harborough to Nottingham	Melton Mowbray North
John O' Gaunt	Great Northern Railway; Leicester Belgrave Road to Grantham	Melton Mowbray North
