= Marefield Junction =

Railway junction in Leicestershire, England

Coordinates: 52.66156°N 0.90523°W

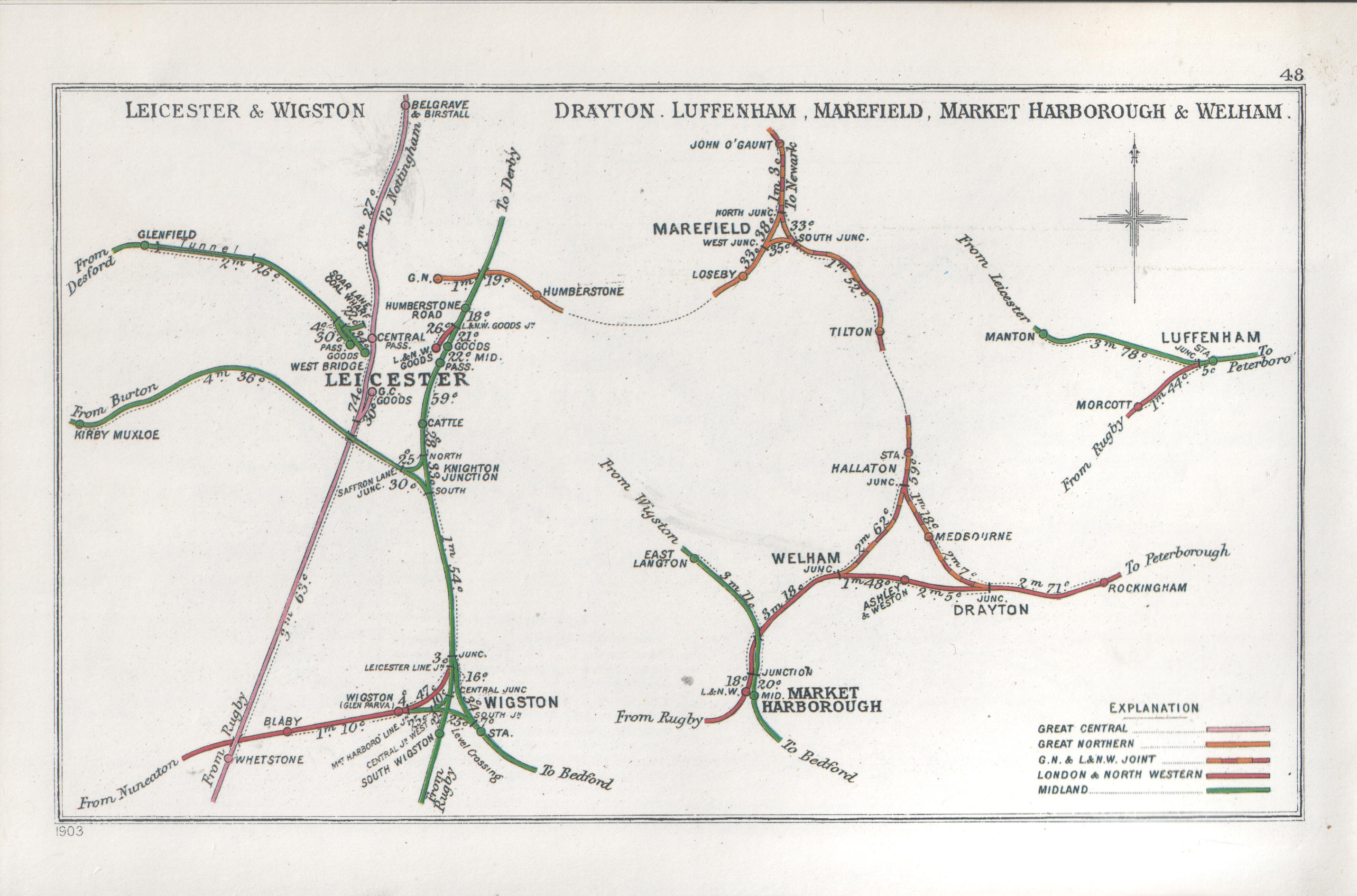
A 1903 Railway Clearing House Junction Diagram showing (top centre) Marefield Junction

Marefield Junction was a railway junction in Marefield, Leicestershire, England. Railway lines from the triangular junction ran westwards to Leicester, northwards to Nottingham and south to Market Harborough. There was never a station at this location, but just to the north was John O' Gaunt railway station; just to the south was Tilton railway station, and just to the west was Lowesby railway station. The viaduct close to the junction still exists although the line has been closed for nearly 50 years.
