= Hayman Levy =

Colonial American merchant and fur trader (1721–1789)

- Born: 1721; Hanover
- Died: 1789 (aged 67–68); New York City, U.S.
- Occupations: Merchant, fur trader, privateer owner
- Known for: Fur trade; founder of Mikveh Israel
- Relatives: Isaac Moses (nephew)

Hayman Levy (1721–1789) was a Jewish merchant in colonial New York City, active in shipping, privateering, and the fur trade. A supporter of the American Revolution, he left New York for Philadelphia during the British occupation and was among the founders of Congregation Mikveh Israel there.

== Early life and business ==
Levy emigrated from Hanover and was living in New York by 1746. He went into business young, and by 1760 he owned a privateer and was trading in furs. He had commercial ties to the Montreal fur-trading partnership of Levy Solomons and Ezekiel Solomons, which operated on an unusually large scale for the period. His business failed in 1768, but he soon recovered. He is often said to have been the first employer of John Jacob Astor.

His nephew, Isaac Moses, worked in Levy's firm before setting up his own company in 1775.

== American Revolution ==
In 1770, Levy signed New York's non-importation resolutions protesting British trade policy. A "Hayman Levy, Junior" also signed the Philadelphia merchants' resolutions of 1765, though it is not certain this was the same man.

When the British occupied New York in 1776, Levy moved to Philadelphia. He is mentioned in the Journals of the Continental Congress for 20 July 1776. In 1782, he was one of the founders of Congregation Mikveh Israel and served on its first board of trustees.

== Return to New York ==
Levy returned to New York in 1784 and helped re-establish Congregation Shearith Israel, of which he had served as parnas. That January, he was one of three signers, with Myer Myers and Isaac Moses, of the congregation's address to Governor George Clinton.

== Family ==
Levy had sixteen children, several of whom became prominent in New York. His daughter Zipporah married Benjamin Mendes Seixas. His son Aaron Levy (1771–1852) was a U.S. Army officer and served as president of Shearith Israel in 1803 and 1804.

== Death ==
He died in New York in 1789.
