= Humberstone railway station =

Former railway station in Leicestershire, England

Coordinates: 52.6425°N 1.0971°W

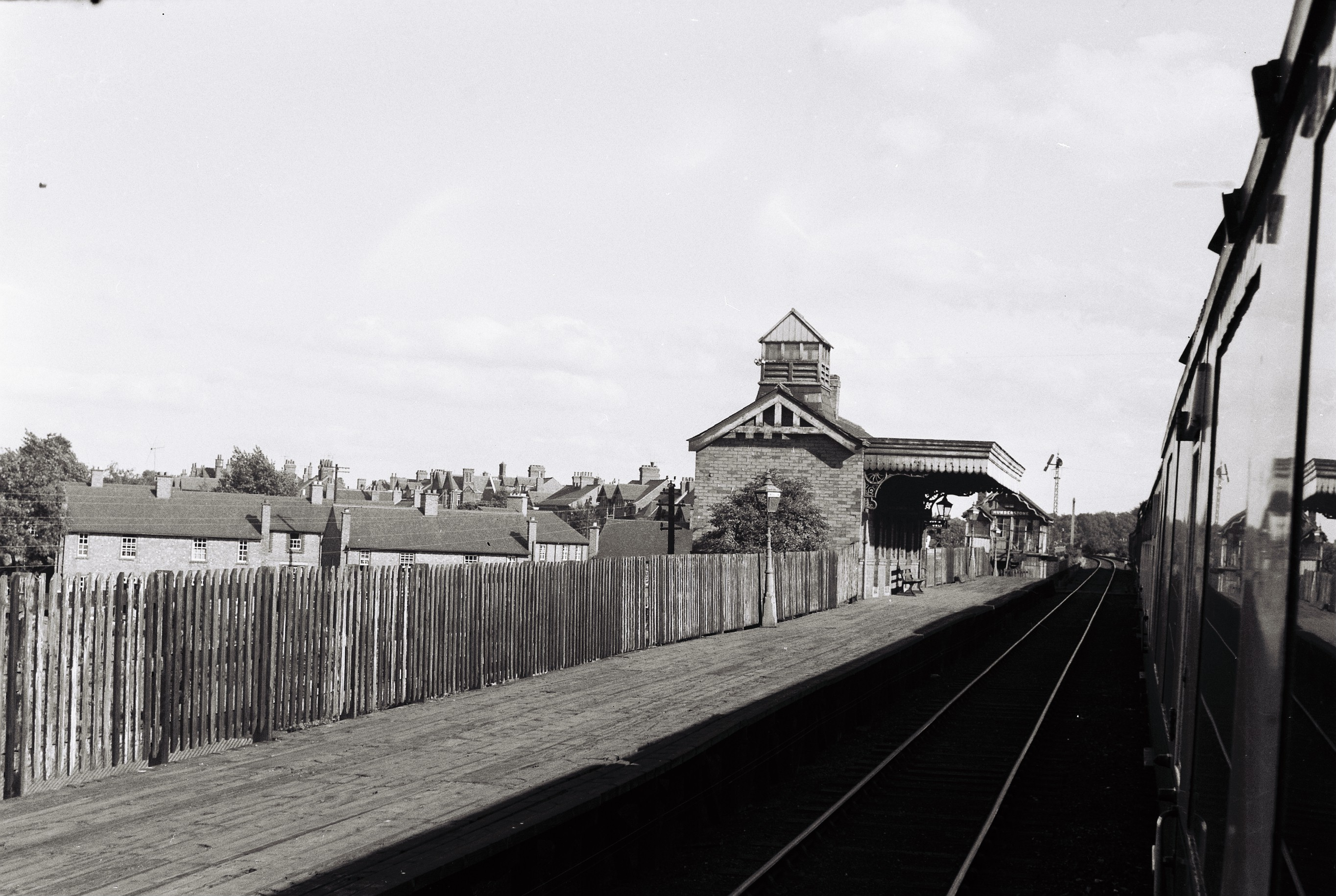
Humberstone station in the 1950s

Humberstone railway station was a railway station serving the eastern side of Leicester. It was on the Great Northern Railway Leicester branch. The station opened in 1882 and closed to regular traffic in 1953 but remained open for summer weekend specials until 1962.. After closure the station was demolished and the site redeveloped. The former Station Masters house is now a private house.

Preceding station	Disused railways	Following station
Leicester Belgrave Road; Line and station closed	Great Northern Railway; Leicester Belgrave Road to Grantham	Thurnby and Scraptoft; Line and station closed
Leicester Belgrave Road; Line and station closed	Great Northern Railway; Leicester Belgrave Road to Peterborough North	Thurnby and Scraptoft; Line and station closed
