= Ingarsby railway station =

Former railway station in Leicestershire, England

Coordinates: 52.6435°N 0.9848°W

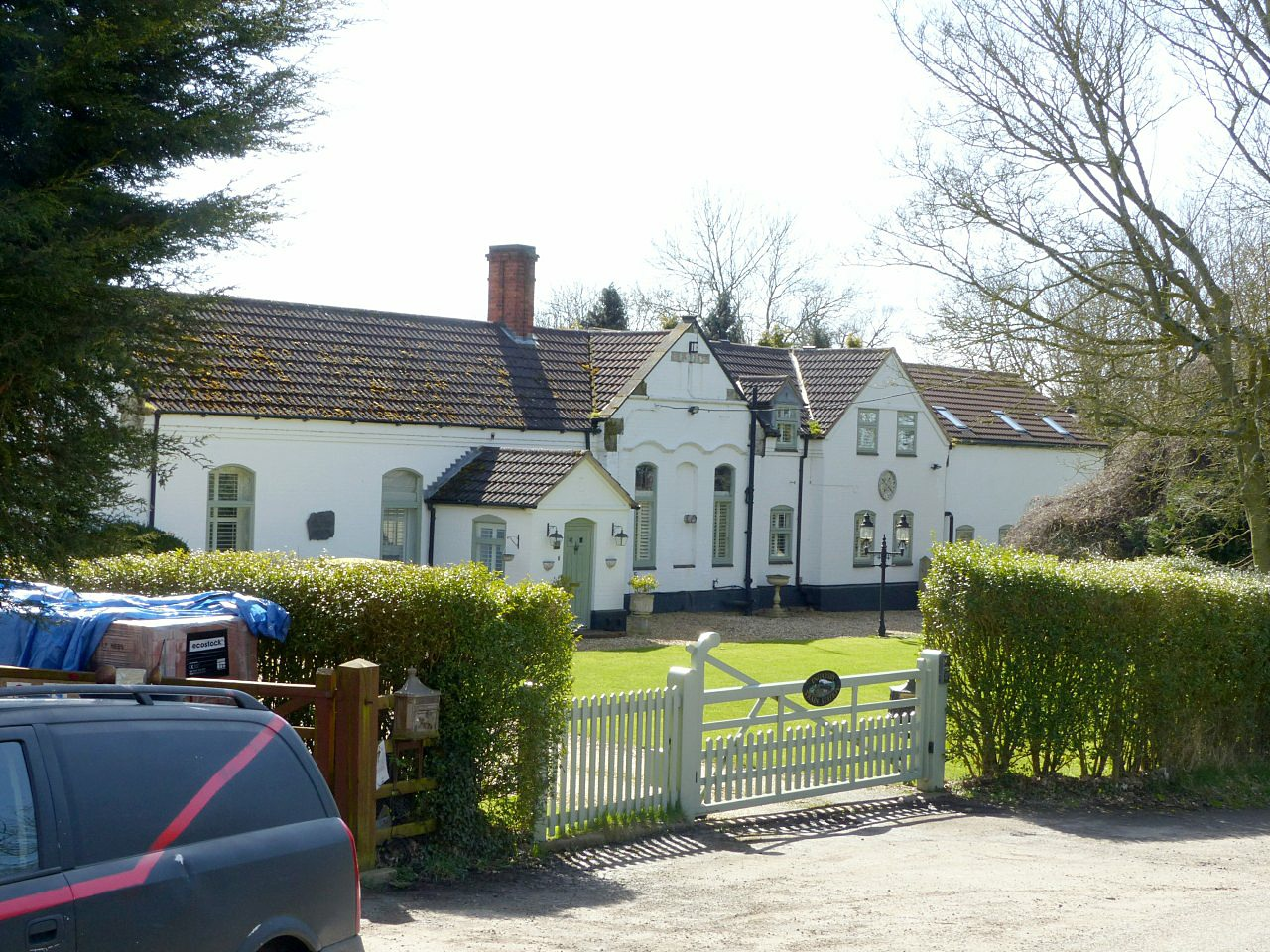
Ingarsby Station as a private residence

Ingarsby railway station was a railway station in Ingarsby, Leicestershire, on the Great Northern Railway Leicester branch. It opened in 1882, and closed to regular passenger trains and goods on 7 December 1953 but a workmen's service continued until 29 April 1957. To the west, about halfway to the next station at Thurnby, lies Ingarsby tunnel, 516 yards (472 metres) long.

Although the correct spelling for the locality is Ingarsby, the station appeared in railway publications as "Ingersby", including Bradshaw for August 1887, July 1902, July 1922 and October 1931, as well as The Railway Clearing House Handbook of Railway Stations (1904). It appeared as "Ingarsby for Houghton" in Bradshaw for December 1944 and in the LNER timetable for May 6th 1946. It was advertised as the station for Houghton on the Hill.

The station building survives today as a private residence.

Preceding station	Disused railways	Following station
Thurnby and Scraptoft; Line and station closed	Great Northern Railway; Leicester Belgrave Road to Grantham	Lowesby; Line and station closed
Thurnby and Scraptoft; Line and station closed	Great Northern Railway; Leicester Belgrave Road to Peterborough North	Lowesby; Line and station closed
