= HMS Halsted =

HMS Halsted, sometimes spelled Halstead, has been the name of more than one ship of the British Royal Navy, and may refer to:

- HMS Barbados (K504), a frigate in commission from 1944 to 1945 that was briefly named HMS Halsted in 1943 while under construction
- HMS Halsted (K556), a frigate in commission from 1943 to 1946
