= Myer Myers =

American silversmith (1723–1795)

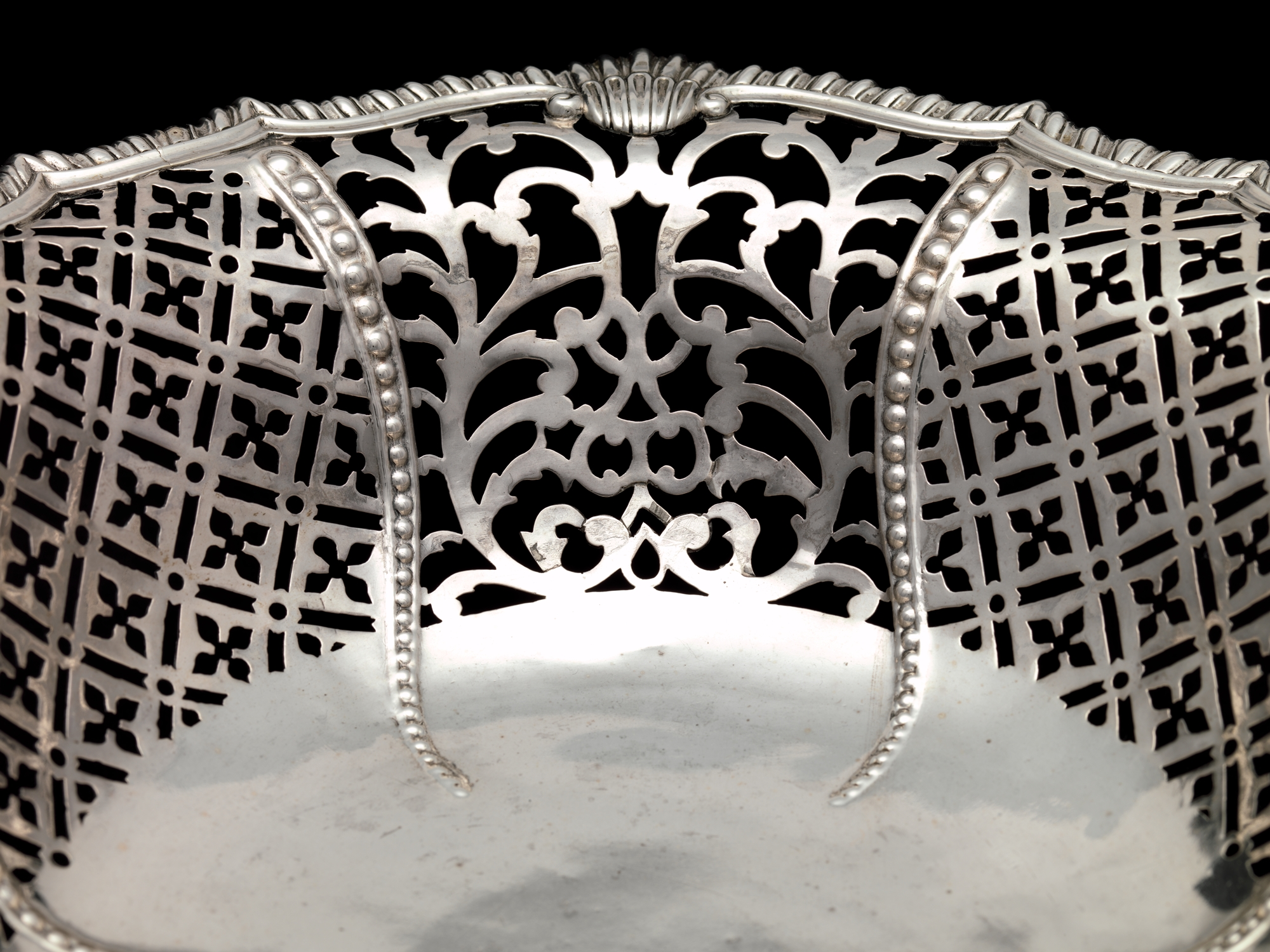
- Basket by Myers, 1770–1776 (Metropolitan Museum of Art)
- Born: 1723; New York City, Province of New York
- Died: 1795 (aged 71–72); New York City, U.S.
- Known for: Silversmithing; rimmonim (Torah finials)
- Movement: Rococo

Myer Myers (1723–1795) was an American silversmith in New York City. The most productive New York silversmith of the late colonial period, he produced some of the finest Rococo domestic and religious silver made in America, and his work, about 380 pieces of which survive, is the largest body of work by a Jewish silversmith anywhere in Europe or America before the 19th century. His Torah finials (rimmonim) for the synagogues of New York, Newport and Philadelphia are the earliest Jewish ceremonial objects made in America.

== Early life and training ==
Myers was born in New York in 1723 to parents who had emigrated from Holland. He was a Jewish American of Ashkenazi origin. Historians believe he trained under the Huguenot silversmith Charles le Roux. He registered as a freeman of New York in 1746 and, at 23, opened a shop on lower Wall Street, where besides practicing his craft he sold tea, coffee, spices and tobacco.

== Career ==
From 1756 to 1766 Myers was in partnership with the silversmith Benjamin Halsted as Halsted & Myers. He worked for many of the leading figures of colonial New York; his patrons included political, military, financial and social leaders, among them the Reverend Samuel Johnson, founding president of King's College (now Columbia University). He marked his work most often with his surname, "Myers," in script within a shaped cartouche, and sometimes with his initials, "MM."

Few workshop accounts or letters survive, so his career as a craftsman is known mainly from his surviving silver; his personal life is better documented through the records of his congregation.

=== Ceremonial silver ===
Myers made silver Torah finials (rimmonim) for the synagogues of New York (Congregation Shearith Israel), Newport (Touro Synagogue) and Philadelphia (Congregation Mikveh Israel), which are still in use. They are unique examples of 18th-century American Jewish silver.

== American Revolution ==
Myers's work as a silversmith and entrepreneur came to an abrupt halt in the summer of 1776. A supporter of the Patriot cause, he left New York with his family during the British occupation and settled in Norwalk, Connecticut. When a British force attacked and burned Norwalk in July 1779, Myers lost his tools, and the family moved east to Stratford, where he continued to work as a silversmith; surviving pieces made there include a tankard and several spoons. He later spent time in Philadelphia.

== Later life ==
Myers returned to New York in 1783. In January 1784 he was one of the signers, with Hayman Levy and Isaac Moses, of the address of Congregation Shearith Israel to Governor George Clinton from "the congregation of Israelites lately returned from exile." In 1785 he was elected the first chairman of the newly formed Gold and Silver Smith's Society of New York. He died in New York in 1795.

== Religious and civic life ==
Myers was active in the general community and in Congregation Shearith Israel, which he served as president twice. He was also a Freemason.

== Legacy ==
In 2001 the Yale University Art Gallery mounted an exhibition of his work, accompanied by a catalogue by David L. Barquist, the gallery's curator of American decorative arts. His work is held by many museums, including the Metropolitan Museum of Art.
