= Goge Africa =

Pan-African tourism and cultural program

- Founded: 1999; 27 years ago
- Founders: Isaac Moses; Nneka Moses
- Type: Cultural Institution
- Headquarters: Lagos, Nigeria
- Region served: Africa
- Product: African music, dance, food, clothes and tourism
- Key people: Isaac Moses; Nneka Moses
- Website: www.gogeafrica.tv

Goge Africa (GA) is a pan-African tourism and cultural programme, which was founded in the year 1999. It was conceptualized and anchored by a Nigerian couple, Isaac and Nneka Moses. The program is watched by over 40millions television (TV) viewers across the globe.

On 1 October 1999, GA premiered on Nigerian TV;African Independent Television (AIT), Nigerian Television Authority (NTA) Channel 10, and Degue Broadcasting Network (DBN).It was later aired on MNET AFRICA MAGIC.

The recording of GA started in Nigeria and moved to Benin Republic, South Africa and Egypt with the plan to cover all countries in Africa. The show was established to showcase the richness of African culture, dance, food, clothes and tourism.

In the year 2016, the Nigerian Broadcasters Merit award (NBMA) inducted the two presenters of the program into Nigerian Broadcasters Hall of Fame. In 2005, the organization launched GA foundation with the aim of mentoring Nigerian youths.

== Background ==
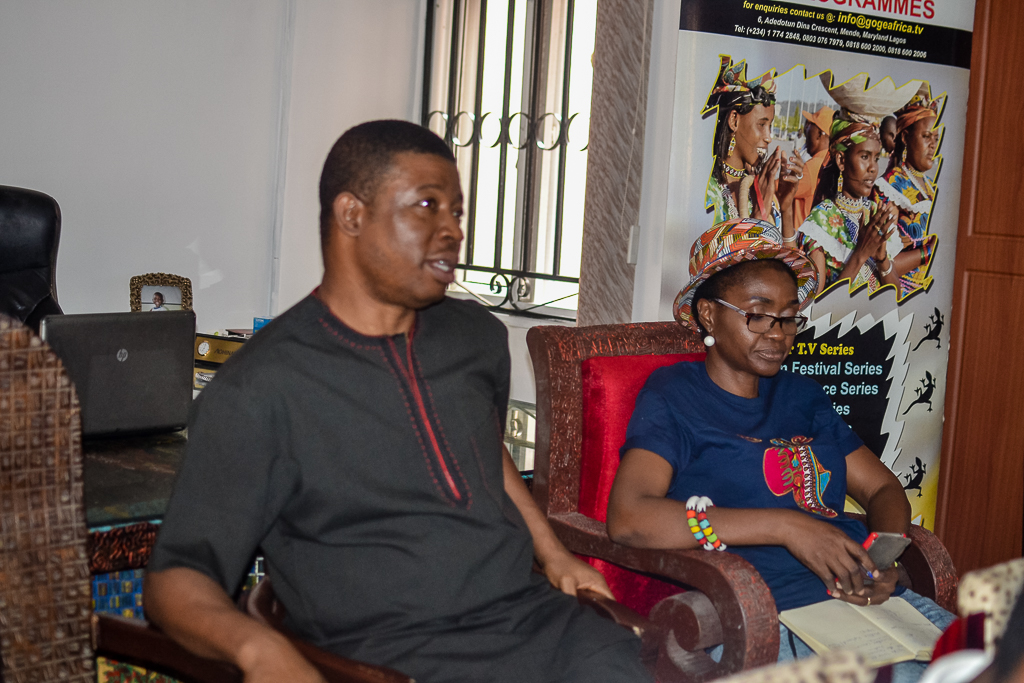
Isaac and Nneka Moses, program coordinators

Goge Africa was founded by the duo of Isaac and Nneka Moses as a pan African cultural project. The program was conceptualized with aim of promoting African culture, music, food and her ways of life through television, radio and magazines. The name Goge Africa, was culled from a musical instrument common among musicians from Northern part of Nigeria called Goge.

According to AIT, "...every tribe, every African culture and tradition is brought to light in a celebratory and joyous manner. Africa has never looked more beautiful than it does on this wonderful show.".

The TV version of the program started in the year 1999 when African programs were not popular on Nigerian TV.

The show is watched by over 40 million television viewers across the globe. In 2016, the two presenters of the show were inducted into the Hall of Fame by NBMA.
