= Levy Solomons =

English-born merchant and fur trader in Montreal (1730–1792)

- Born: Lucius Levy Solomons; 1730; England
- Died: May 18, 1792; Montreal, Province of Quebec
- Occupations: Merchant, fur trader, army supplier
- Known for: Supplying the Continental Army during the invasion of Quebec; co-founder of Montreal's first synagogue
- Spouse: Rebecca Franks (m. 1775)
- Children: 12

Lucius Levy Solomons (1730 – 18 May 1792) was an English-born Jewish merchant and fur trader active in the Province of New York and later in Montreal. He was a founder of Congregation Shearith Israel, the first Jewish congregation in Canada, and supported the American forces during their occupation of Montreal in 1775–1776, at heavy cost to his business.

== Early career ==
Solomons was born in England and had settled in the Province of New York by 1755. During the Seven Years' War he formed a partnership to supply the British army with his cousin Ezekiel Solomons, Chapman Abraham, Benjamin Lyon, and Gershom Levy.

After the British conquest of New France in 1760, the partners turned to the Canadian fur trade. Because Jews could now settle legally in Quebec under British rule, Solomons eventually moved his base of operations from Albany to Montreal. Backed by creditors in England and linked to the New York fur merchant Hayman Levy, the consortium operated on a larger scale than most traders of the period. Solomons was at Fort Niagara in 1762.

== Pontiac's War and financial ruin ==
During Pontiac's War in 1763, Solomons and three of his partners were taken captive and their goods seized. All four survived, but the losses, estimated at £18,000, ruined the partnership. A sale of furs was held for their creditors in 1764, but debts remained. Efforts to obtain compensation from the government failed, as did an attempt to use English bankruptcy law, which British authorities ruled did not extend to the colony.

== Montreal fur trade ==
The partnership dissolved, but its members stayed in the trade as it recovered in the late 1760s. By 1771 Solomons held licences for seven canoes, with goods probably worth more than £3,000, and he also bought furs from independent traders. His former partner Benjamin Lyon claimed in 1770 that Solomons had handled most of the furs passing through Montreal that year; the claim may be exaggerated, but Solomons was clearly a significant figure in the trade. In 1773 he signed a petition calling for an elected legislative assembly in Quebec.

== American Revolution ==
When American forces took Montreal in 1775 during the invasion of Quebec, Solomons cooperated with them. He supplied the troops and set up three hospitals, and the invaders also took large quantities of the goods he had stocked for the fur trade.

After the Americans withdrew in 1776, Solomons stayed in Montreal but faced hostility from the restored British authorities, who evicted him from his house and threatened people who assisted him. He nonetheless remained in business until 1782. In 1784 he petitioned the Congress of the Confederation for reimbursement of his wartime losses, without success.

== Religious life ==
In December 1768 Solomons and his cousin Ezekiel were among the founders of Shearith Israel in Montreal. By 1782 he appears to have been the congregation's lay leader, and in that capacity he was the defendant when the congregation's reader, Jacob Raphael Cohen, sued to collect his salary. The case was appealed and settled in 1784.

== Personal life ==
Solomons had one child by his first marriage. On 31 May 1775 he married Rebecca Franks, with whom he had eleven children. He died in Montreal on 18 May 1792.

== See also ==
- History of the Jews in Canada
- Military history of Jewish Americans
