= USS Halsted =

USS Halsted, sometimes spelled Halstead, has been the name of more than one ship of the United States Navy, and may refer to:

- USS Halstead (PF-76), a name briefly carried in 1943 by a patrol frigate under construction; she was transferred to the British Royal Navy upon completion as HMS Barbados (K504)
- USS Halsted (DE-91), a name briefly carried in 1943 by a destroyer escort under construction; she was transferred to the British Royal Navy upon completion as HMS Halsted (K556)
