= Tilton railway station =

Former railway station in Leicestershire, England

Coordinates: 52.6436°N 0.8769°W

Tilton

General information
- Location: Tilton on the Hill, Leicestershire; England
- Grid reference: SK761057
- Platforms: 2

Other information
- Status: Disused

History
- Pre-grouping: Great Northern and London and North Western Joint Railway
- Post-grouping: LNER and LMS joint

Key dates
- 15 December 1879: Opened
- 7 December 1953: Closed
Location

Tilton railway station was a railway station serving the village of Tilton on the Hill, in Leicestershire, England. on the Great Northern and London and North Western Joint Railway. It opened in 1879 and closed in 1953. To the north of the station was Marefield Junction.

Former Services

Preceding station	Disused railways	Following station
John O' Gaunt	London and North Western Railway; Nottingham to Northampton	East Norton
Lowesby	Great Northern Railway; Leicester Belgrave Road to Peterborough North	East Norton

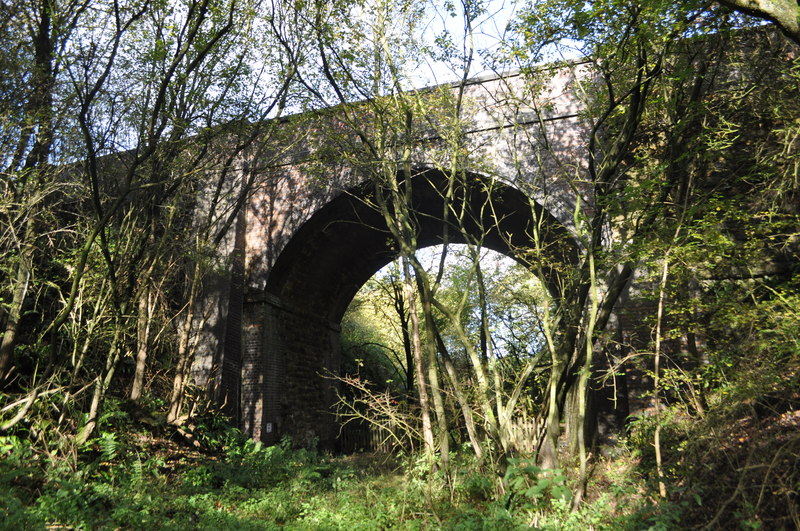
The site of the railway station in 2010
