= Caroline Halsted =

British historian and author

- Born: c. 1803
- Died: 2 July 1848; Middleham
- Occupation: writer
- Known for: writing

Caroline Amelia Halsted later Caroline Amelia Atthil (c. 1803 – 2 July 1848) was a British historian and writer.

== Life ==
Halsted was born in 1803 or 1804 and her father was Captain John Halsted of the Royal Navy.

She wrote "The Little Botanist, Or, Steps to the Attainment of Botanical Knowledge" which was published in 1835. She wrote another book in 1836 concerning a child and her mother investigating household objects. In 1839 she published a well received biography of Margaret Beaufort. In the following year she argued the importance of women to education in "The Obligations of Literature to the Mothers of England".

Halsted researched the life of Richard III and argued that he been unfairly treated in her 1844 book. Historians had cast him as a bad king but he was possibly not guilty of murdering both the Duke of Clarence or the Princes in the tower. Her book was published in two volumes.

Halsted died in Middleham on 2 July 1848.
