= John O'Gaunt railway station =

Former railway station in Leicestershire, England

Coordinates: 52°40′46″N 00°54′20″W

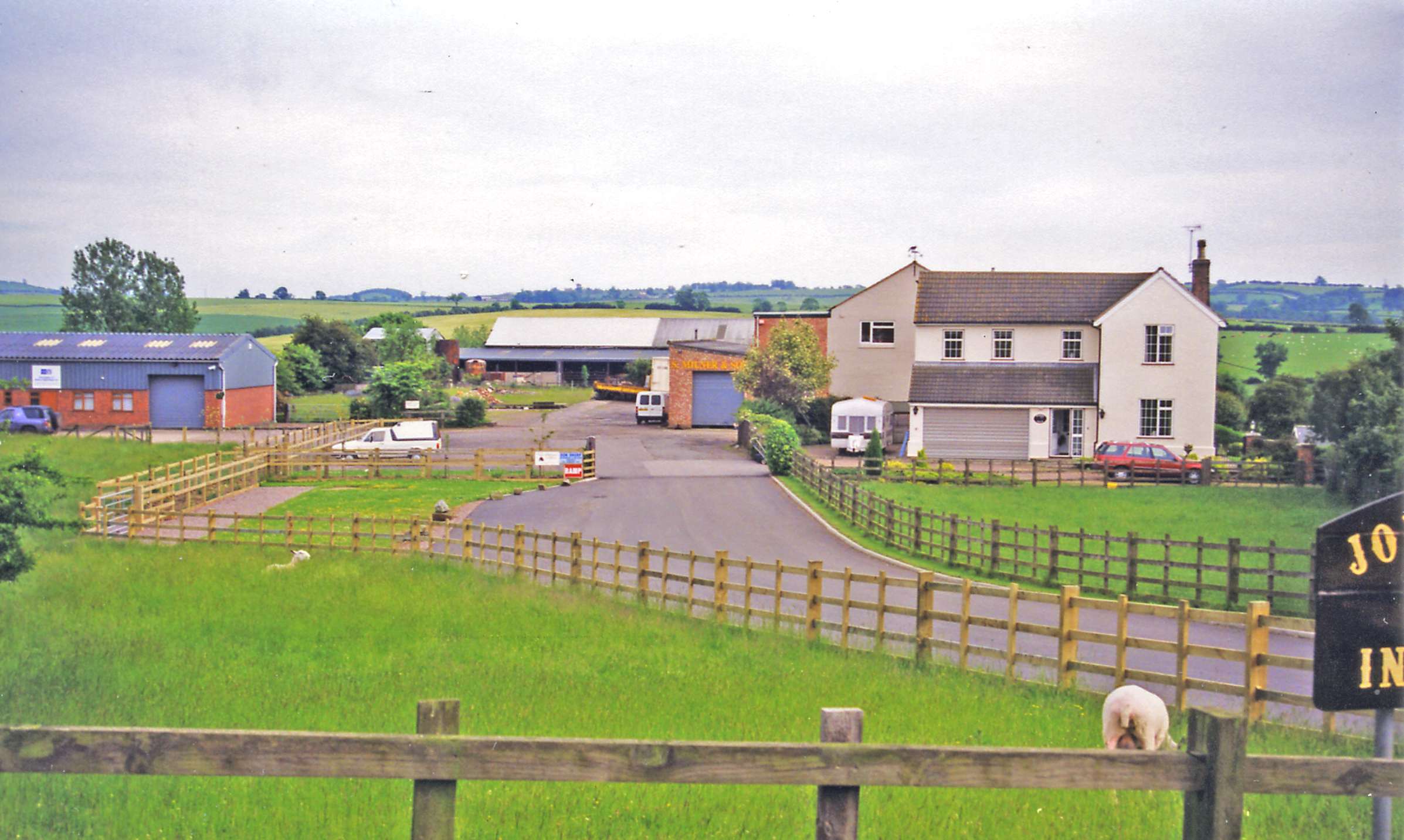
The site of the station in 1998

John O'Gaunt railway station was a railway station serving the villages of Twyford, John O'Gaunt and Burrough on the Hill in Leicestershire, England. on the Great Northern and London and North Western Joint Railway. It opened in 1879 as Burrow & Twyford and was renamed John O'Gaunt in 1883. It closed to regular traffic in 1953. To the south of the station was Marefield Junction.

Former Services

Preceding station	Disused railways	Following station
Tilton	London and North Western Railway; Market Harborough to Nottingham	Great Dalby
Lowesby	Great Northern Railway; Leicester Belgrave Road to Grantham	Great Dalby
