= Halsted BH-1 Saffire =

BH-1 Saffire
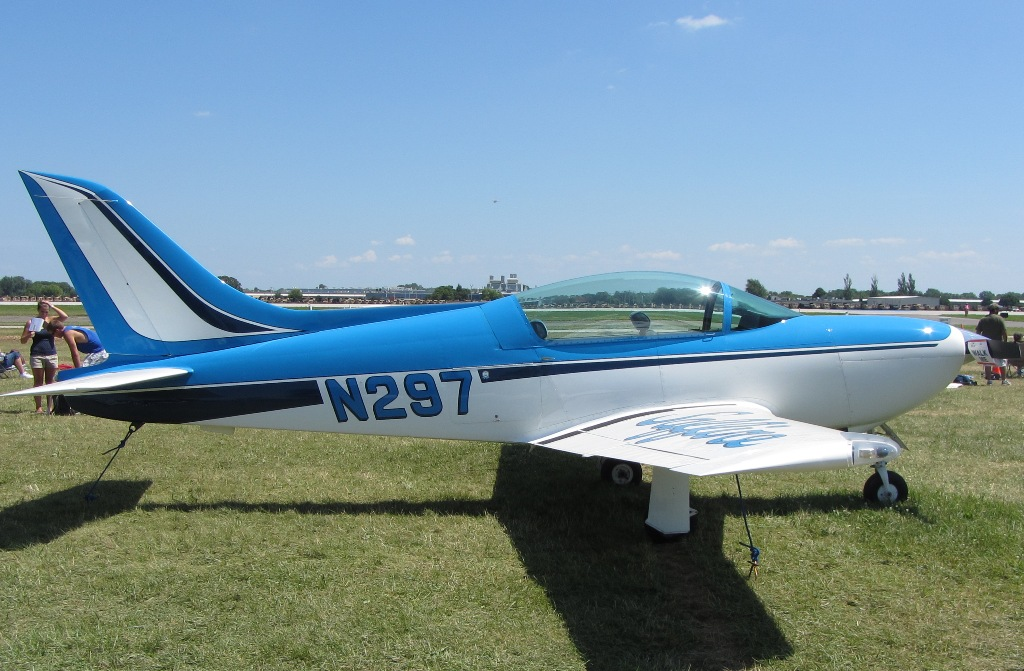

General information
- Type: Homebuilt aircraft
- National origin: United States
- Manufacturer: Barry Halsted, Russ Reynolds
- Designer: Barry Halsted
- Number built: 1

History
- Introduction date: 1990

The Halsted BH-1 Saffire is a homebuilt aircraft design introduced in the early 1990s.

== Design and development ==
Barry Halsted is an aircraft engineer who has also been an author for R/C Modeler Magazine, developing model aircraft plans. While Saffire was originally concepted in 1972, the actual design began in 1980 and construction started in 1982. First flight occurred in November, 1990.

Saffire is a two-place, tandem seat, low-wing, retractable tricycle gear monoplane. The wing is aluminum and the fuselage features a steel tube structure forward of the rear seat. The canopy is mounted on tracks allowing it to slide open.

== Operational history ==
Testing identified flutter in the elevator and rudder at higher speeds. Increasing the radius of the leading edge of the elevator and adding an internal stiffener in the rudder corrected the issue. Saffire won a Silver Lindy award at AirVenture in 1991 and the Paul H. Poberezney award for best homebuilt aircraft over 20 years old in 2011.

== Specifications (BH-1 Saffire) ==
Data from Sport Aviation

General characteristics

- Crew: one
- Capacity: two
- Wingspan: 28 ft (8.5 m)
- Empty weight: 1,650 lb (748 kg)
- Gross weight: 2,450 lb (1,111 kg)
- Powerplant: 1 × Continental IO-360 ES , 210 hp (160 kW)

Performance

- Cruise speed: 178 kn (205 mph, 330 km/h)
- Never exceed speed: 222 kn (255 mph, 411 km/h)
