= Twyford, Leicestershire =

Village in Leicestershire, England

Twyford
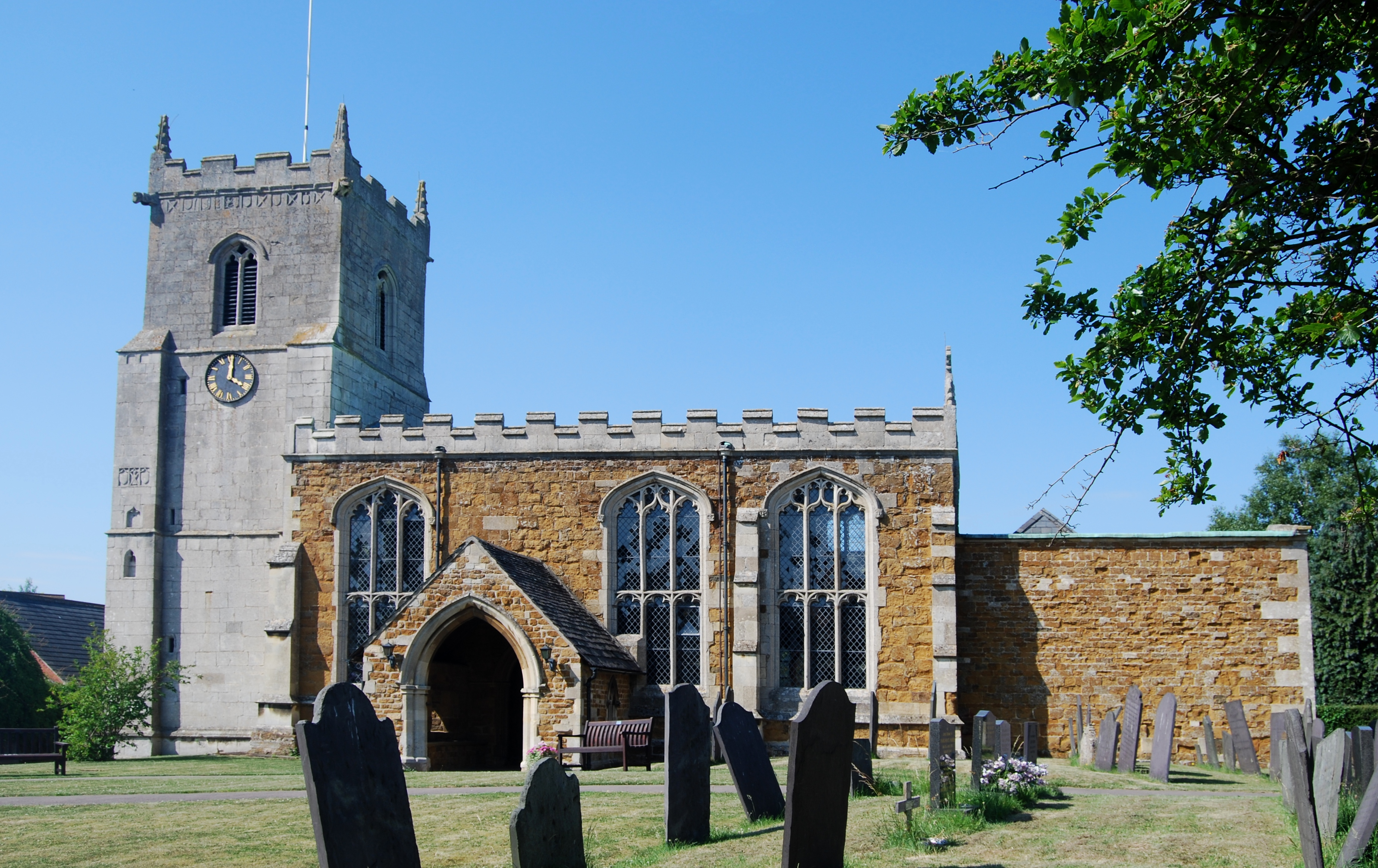
- St Andrews Parish Church, Twyford

- Location within Leicestershire
- Civil parish: Twyford and Thorpe
- District: Melton
- Shire county: Leicestershire
- Region: East Midlands
- Country: England
- Sovereign state: United Kingdom
- Post town: Melton Mowbray
- Postcode district: LE14
- Police: Leicestershire
- Fire: Leicestershire
- Ambulance: East Midlands
- UK Parliament: Melton and Syston

Twyford is a village and former civil parish, now in the parish of Twyford and Thorpe, in the Melton district, in the county of Leicestershire, England. The name is derived from the two fords in the village. There are two churches in the village; St Andrew (Church of England), which is a Grade I listed building with some parts dated from the 12th century, and a Methodist church. The village is in the south of the parish of Twyford and Thorpe. In 1931, the parish had a population of 282. On 1 April 1936, the parish was abolished to from "Twyford and Thorpe".

The other main focal points of Twyford consist of The Saddle Inn public house, Twyford Recreation Ground and Twyford Village Hall.

In 2002, Twyford hosted one of the largest events in the region for HM Queen's Golden Jubilee. It consisted of a traditional street party before moving to an evening entertainment in two large marquees at the Recreation Ground. The Sunday was a family funday with tug of war event and firework finale. The event was enjoyed by people who came from far and wide to enjoy the event.

Again in 2003, Twyford continued the theme with an event to mark the 50th anniversary of the Queen's coronation.

There have also been sightings in the village of a large cat such as "panther" which apparently roams the area. However, other than individual sightings and some loose evidence of sheep attacks, nothing has, as yet, been officially confirmed.
