= Daniel J. Halstead =

Daniel J. Halstead was the publisher of The Syracuse Daily Union (1860), The Syracuse Daily Courier and Union (1860–1869), The Syracuse Daily Courier (1869–1888) and The Syracuse Courier (1888–1898) newspapers.

In 1860 H. S. McCullom's Syracuse Daily Courier newspaper was in support of John C. Breckinridge for the presidential campaign. In response friends of Frederick Douglass started The Syracuse Daily Union newspaper, with Daniel J. Halstead, as the proprietor. With the election of Abraham Lincoln the two papers were consolidated under the name The Syracuse Daily Courier and Union, with Halstead as publisher and sole proprietor. The "Union" part of the name was dropped in 1869 and the Syracuse Daily Courier was the name of the paper from that time until 1888 when the word "Daily" was also dropped from the title.

On 1 January 1876, Halstead took as partners Milton N. Northrup and S. Gurney Lapham, under the firm name of D. J. Halstead & Co., each of the partners owning one-third of the firm. In May, 1883, D. J. Halstead & Co. were succeeded by the Courier Printing Company, the majority of the shares in the company being held by Halstead and his partners.
