= Isaac Moses =

American merchant and banker (1742–1818)

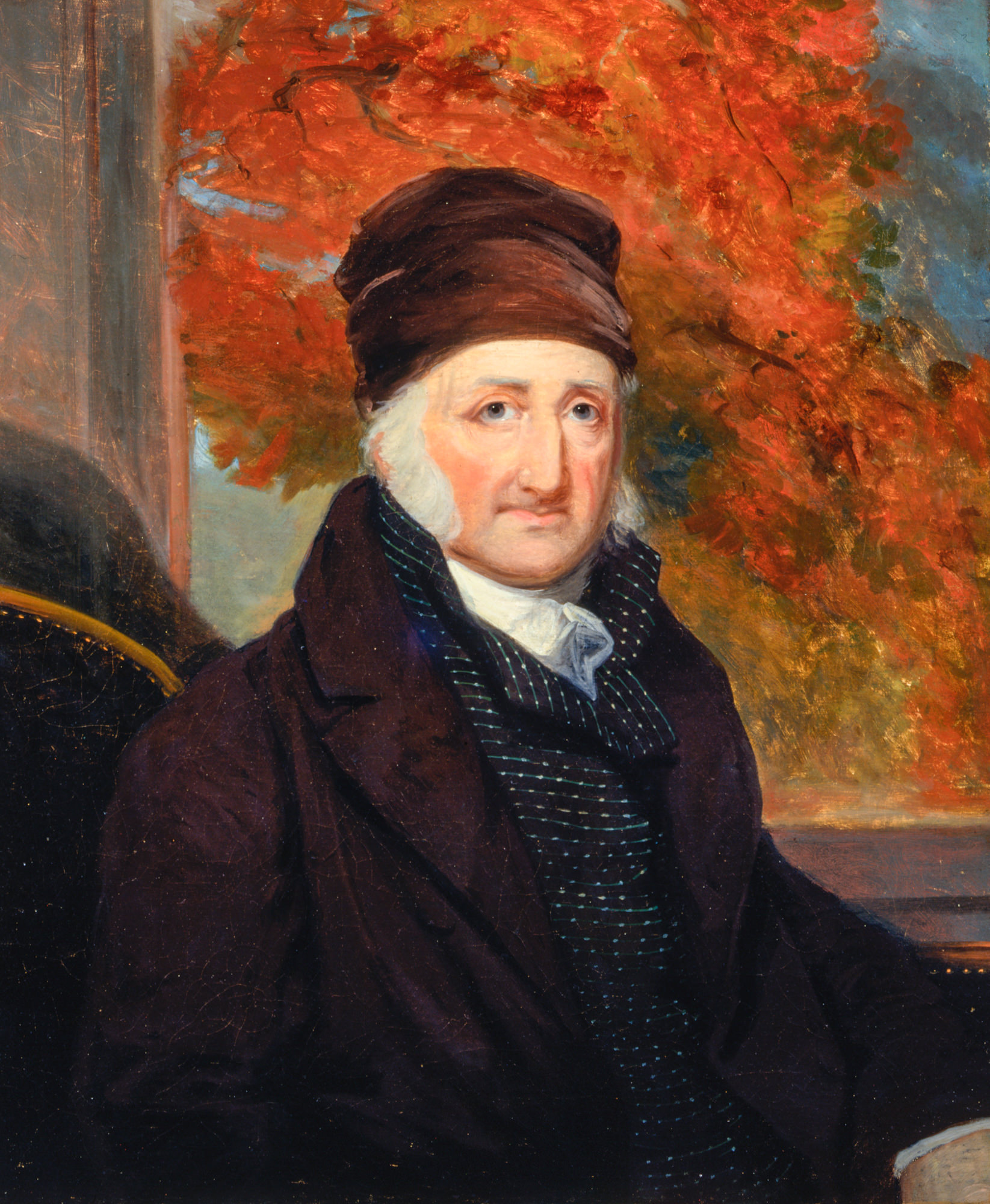
- Portrait of Moses by John Jarvis
- Born: c. 1742; Giessen, Holy Roman Empire
- Died: 16 April 1818 (aged c. 76)
- Occupations: Merchant, privateer owner, banker
- Known for: Financing the Continental cause; co-founder of the Bank of North America
- Relatives: Hayman Levy (uncle)

Isaac Moses (c. 1742 – 16 April 1818) was an American merchant, privateer owner, and banker who helped establish the Bank of North America in 1781. A supporter of the American Revolution, he helped finance the Continental cause and worked closely with Robert Morris. He was also a leader of the early American Jewish community, serving as president of Congregation Shearith Israel in New York and helping to found Congregation Mikveh Israel in Philadelphia.

== Early life ==
Moses was born in Giessen, in the Holy Roman Empire, and emigrated to New York in 1764. He became a freeman of New York City in 1766 and worked in the mercantile firm of his uncle, Hayman Levy.

== American Revolution ==
In 1775 Moses formed Isaac Moses & Company with two partners. When American forces moved against Canada that year, the three partners offered Congress $20,000 in hard currency.

After the British occupied New York, Moses ran the firm from Philadelphia. He asked Congress for gunpowder to arm a schooner he had fitted out, and over the course of the war he took part in eight privateering ventures, ran ships through the British blockade, and repeatedly extended credit to Congress. Morris was his partner in both trade and privateering. With property valued at £115,000, Moses was probably the wealthiest Jew in wartime Philadelphia.

== Later career ==
Moses returned to New York in 1783. Despite going bankrupt in 1786, he rebuilt his fortune and founded the international trading firm Isaac Moses & Sons. He was a major stockholder in the Bank of New York, a member of the New York Chamber of Commerce, and a Freemason in the city's Union Lodge.

== Religious life ==
Moses served as president of Congregation Shearith Israel in New York and was one of the principal organizers of Congregation Mikveh Israel in Philadelphia. In January 1784 he signed, with Hayman Levy and Myer Myers, Shearith Israel's address to Governor George Clinton.

== Family and legacy ==
Moses married Reyna Levy; the couple had ten children. He died in 1818 and was buried in the Shearith Israel cemetery. His portrait was later given to the Museum of the City of New York. The family's papers are held by the American Jewish Historical Society.
