= Nneka Isaac Moses =

Nigerian presenter

Nneka Isaac Moses is a Nigerian presenter, fashion designer, and the co-founder and managing director of the African cultural show Goge Africa.

== Early life ==
Moses attended the University of Lagos from 1987 to 1990 where she obtained a bachelor's degree in English Language and Literature. In Surulere, Lagos, she established Akenn. G Limited, a fashion house where she produced costumes for motion pictures, TV commercials, and special events.

== Goge Africa ==
Moses co-founded Goge Africa in 1999, alongside her husband Isaac, three years after their marriage. The program was first aired on October 1, to coincide with Nigeria's independence day. It is viewed by over 40 million people syndicated in 15 channels. The Goge Africa team have been to over 32 countries in Africa.

== Personal life ==
Moses married Isaac in 1996. In an interview she gave with Naij.com she described the first time they met saying she actually slapped him when he attempted to kiss her during screenplay. He later came begging asking to go on a date with her to apologize and they got along from then. She gave birth to her son Kamamra 13 years after marriage. She won the Young Ambassador for Peace award in 2011.
