= John O'Gaunt, Leicestershire =

Village in Leicestershire, England

Coordinates: 52°40′47″N 00°54′35″W

John O'Gaunt, (properly John O' Gaunt) is a small village in the English county of Leicestershire.

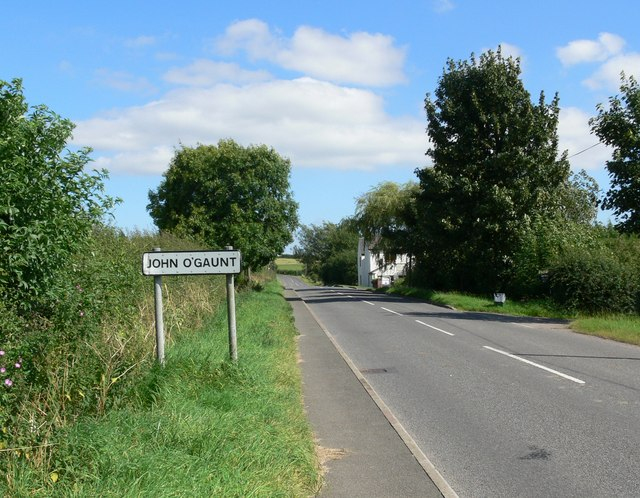
Outskirts photographed August 2007

The population of the village is included in the civil parish of Twyford and Thorpe

== Etymology ==
The area takes its name from the former John O'Gaunt railway station, which took its name from a covert known to local hunters some distance away.

== Governance ==
John O'Gaunt is in the civil parish of Somerby which, in turn, is part of the district of Melton.
