= Benjamin Halsted =

American silversmith

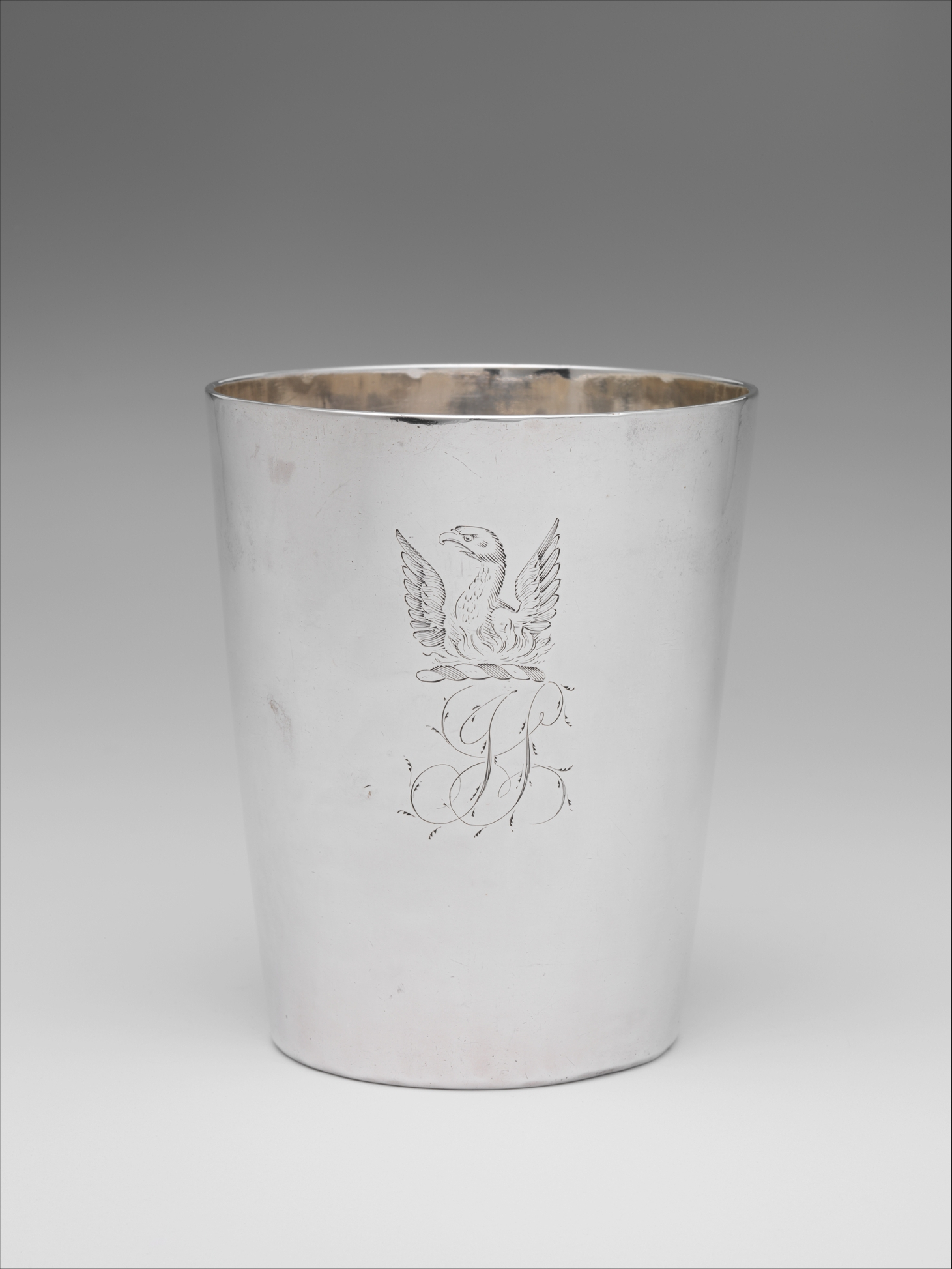
Beaker by Benjamin Halsted, circa 1805

Benjamin Halsted (February 17, 1734 – May 22, 1817), also spelled Benjamin Halstead, was an American silversmith active in New York City, Philadelphia, and Elizabeth, New Jersey. In 1794 he founded the first thimble factory in the United States.

Halsted was born in Hempstead, New York, made a freeman of New York City in 1764, and married Sarah Treadwell on October 22, 1765. In New York City from 1756 to 1766 he was a partner with silversmith Myer Myers as Halsted & Myers, and in 1766 with his brother Mathias in Elizabeth, New Jersey, and again from 1799-1809 with his son Mathias Halsted as Benjamin Halsted & Son, gold- and silversmiths and thimble manufacturers. In intervening years, he worked from 1783-1785 as a gold- and silversmith in Philadelphia, and from 1786-1814 as a gold- and silversmith in New York City. In 1786 he was a member of Gold and Silversmiths' Society, and listed in the New York City directory at 13 or 18 Maiden Lane.

- "A Premonition to those Gentlemen that may hereafter have an Occasion to employ a Silver-Smith, to beware of that Villain Benjamin Halsted; lest they be bit by him, as I have been.

"Andrew Bowne." - The New-York Gazette or the Weekly Post-Boy, New York City, August 16, 1764.

- "The Subscriber finds himself obliged, with infinite Reluctance, to address the Public on Account of a surrilous Advertisement in the New-York Gazette of Thursday last Week, signed by one Andrew Bowne. The Character and Reputation of a Man in Trade, being of the most delicate and tender Nature, any Attempts to stigmatize it, not founded on Facts, or supported by Evidence, will never, I flatter myself, influence the impartial Part of Mankind, before the Truth has been scrutinized in a legal Manner. But, some Time must elapse before this can be done: And as the Audaciousness of the Advertisement may make impressions to my Prejudice, I shall endeavour to remove them, by laying all my Transactions with Bowne, open to the Public; where by it may easily be perceived the Means by which his Brain was so violently heated as to overcome his reason.

"Andrew Bowne, of Shrewsbury, called on me last Summer, telling me Joseph Holmes, of this City, had recommended me to him as an honest Silversmith. He then bespoke a Set of Silver Buttons for a Suit of Clothes. They were made exactly to his Directions; and when he came to fetch them he seemed perfectly pleased with them. Three Weeks afterwards he called on me, and desired I would take them back. I represented to him how unsaleable Things made after another's Whim were; and that before I found a Person of his Taste, Years might elapse. He then offered me a Dollar; which I refusing he grew passionate, and went away in the greatest Anger. On his Return Home, he wrote me the Annexed Letter (No. 1) which I despised, and returned no answer to. Last May he wrote me another (No. 2) in both which he has been very lavish of Names that no honest Man can well brook. I returned him an Answer (No. 3) with a View to pass the Affair into Ridicule; but it had a contrary Effect; and the Advertisement in Question was produced by it.
"Private Affairs, of a trivial and insignificant Nature, are unworthy of the Attention of the Public. But when malicious Defamation is allowed to blast Characters in a public Newspaper, a justification in the same public Manner becomes necessary; This Apology, I hope, will plead my Excuse" - The New-York Gazette or the Weekly Post-Boy, New York City, September 6, 1764.

- "Benjamin & Matthias Halsted, Gold and Silver-Smiths, Take this method to acquaint the public, that they have now set up their business in Elizabeth-Town (nearly opposite to Mr. Joseph Jelf's Merchant) where they propose to carry it on in all its branches, as the said Benjamin Halsted, has followed the business some time in New-York, to the satisfaction of his employers, he hopes his former customers there and in the country will not forget him, as he will now obey all orders for work from them and other gentlemen and ladies of the city or country, at the shortest notice and most reasonable prices, with the greatest care and exactness to their intire satisfaction; as we purpose to make work of all qualities (prices accordingly) we hope our employers will not expect the best of work for the meanest prices." The New-York Gazette or the Weekly Post-Boy, New York City, September 25, 1766.
- "Philadelphia, April 27. Eight Dollars Reward.

"Ran-away from the subscriber, a negro man, named John Frances, but commonly called Jack: he is about 40 years of age, five feets ten inches high, [sl]ender built, speaks good English, by trade a goldsmith; he generally affects to be very polite, and it's more than probable he may pass as a freeman. Said negro was carried to New [Y]ork and left in charge of Mr. Ephraim Brasher, goldsmith, from whom he abscounded, and returned to me after skulking about this city for a considerable time: had on when he went away, an old green coat, fustian waistcoat and breeches, a pair of half boots, but may probably changed his dress. All masters of vessels and others are forbid to harbour or carry him off at their peril. Whoever takes up said negro and delivers him to John Le Telier, goldsmith in Market street, or to the subscriber in New York, shall have the above reward, and all reasonable charges paid.

"Benjamin Halsted" - Pennsylvania Packet, May 1, 1784

- "Thimble Manufactory, Benjamin Halstead Respectfully informs his Friends and the Public in general, that he still continues carrying on the Gold and Silversmith business No. 67 Broad street, he has brought the manufactory of Gold, Silver and Pinchbeck Thimbles with steel top to great perfection and thinks he could make a sufficient quantity to supply the United States. Citizens, consider your interest, and encourage American Manufactures.

"Those imported are of the Slightest kind, I will engage that one of mine, will do more service than 3 of them, and I know by experience, that imported ones of the quality of mine cost 18 shillings per doz. and could not be sold by 25 percent, as low as mine. Every dealer in this article will soon find the advantage of keeping Halsted's Thimbles, and have the satisfaction of knowing that he d"oes his customers justice. Silver and steel Bodkins, tooth and ear picks by the doz. or single." - Advertised in the Diary or Evening Register, New York City, August 30, 1794.

His works are collected in the Art Institute of Chicago, Metropolitan Museum of Art, Museum of Fine Arts, Boston, Philadelphia Museum of Art, Museum of the City of New York.
