= HMS Barbados (K504) =

Colony-class frigate

History

United States
- Name: USS Halsted (PG-184)
- Namesake: Royal Navy Captain Sir Lawrence Halsted (1764-1841), commanding officer of HMS Namur at the Battle of Cape Ortegal in 1805 (British name assigned in anticipation of ship's transfer to United Kingdom)
- Reclassified: Patrol frigate, PF-76, 15 April 1943
- Builder: Walsh-Kaiser Company, Providence, Rhode Island
- Laid down: 11 May 1943
- Renamed: Barbados, 1943
- Namesake: Barbados (British name assigned in anticipation of ship's transfer to United Kingdom)
- Launched: 27 August 1943
- Sponsored by: Miss Anna M. Pacheco
- Commissioned: never
- Fate: Transferred to United Kingdom 18 December 1943
- Acquired: Returned by United Kingdom 15 April 1946
- Fate: Sold for scrapping 30 October 1947

United Kingdom
- Name: HMS Barbados
- Namesake: Barbados
- Acquired: 18 December 1943
- Commissioned: 18 December 1943
- Identification: Pennant number: K504
- Fate: Returned to United States, 15 April 1946

General characteristics
- Class & type: Colony-class frigate/Tacoma-class patrol frigate
- Displacement: 1,264 long tons (1,284 t)
- Length: 303 ft 11 in (92.63 m)
- Beam: 37 ft 6 in (11.43 m)
- Draft: 13 ft 8 in (4.17 m)
- Propulsion: 3 × boilers; 2 × turbines, 5,500 shp (4,100 kW) each; 2 shafts
- Speed: 20 knots (37 km/h; 23 mph)
- Complement: 190
- Armament: 3 × single 3 inch/50 AA guns; 2 × twin 40 mm guns; 9 × single 20 mm; 1 × Hedgehog anti-submarine mortar; 8 × Y-gun depth charge projectors; 2 × depth charge racks

HMS Barbados was a Colony-class frigate of the United Kingdom that served during World War II. She originally was ordered by the United States Navy as the Tacoma-class patrol frigate USS Halsted (PF-76) – sometimes spelled Halstead – and was transferred to the Royal Navy prior to completion.

== Construction and acquisition ==
The ship, originally designated a "patrol gunboat," PG-184, was ordered by the United States Maritime Commission under a United States Navy contract as USS Halsted. She was reclassified as a "patrol frigate," PF-76, on 15 April 1943 and laid down by the Walsh-Kaiser Company at Providence, Rhode Island, on 11 May 1943. Intended for transfer to the United Kingdom, the ship was renamed Barbados by the British prior to launching and was launched on 27 August 1943, sponsored by Miss Anna M. Pacheco.

== Service history ==
Transferred to the United Kingdom under Lend-Lease on 18 December 1943, the ship served in the Royal Navy as HMS Barbados (K504) on patrol and escort duty.

== Disposal ==
The United Kingdom returned Barbados to the U.S. Navy on 15 April 1946. She was sold to the Sun Shipbuilding and Drydock Company of Chester, Pennsylvania, on 30 October 1947 for scrapping.
