= HMS Halsted (K556) =

Captain-class frigate

History

United States
- Name: unnamed (DE-91)
- Ordered: 10 January 1942
- Builder: Bethlehem-Hingham Shipyard, Hingham, Massachusetts
- Laid down: 28 July 1943
- Launched: 14 October 1943
- Renamed: USS Russell (DE-91) 1943
- Namesake: British name assigned in anticipation of transfer to United Kingdom
- Renamed: USS Halsted (DE-91) 1943
- Namesake: British name assigned in anticipation of transfer to United Kingdom
- Completed: 3 November 1943
- Stricken: 13 November 1944
- Fate: Transferred to United Kingdom 3 November 1943
- Acquired: Nominally returned by United Kingdom 1946
- Fate: Sold for scrapping 1 November 1946 or 28 March 1947

United Kingdom
- Name: HMS Halsted (K556)
- Namesake: Captain Sir Lawrence Halsted (1764–1841), commanding officer of HMS Namur at the Battle of Cape Ortegal in 1805
- Acquired: 3 November 1943
- Commissioned: 3 November 1943
- Fate: Declared constructive total loss after 11 June 1944; Nominally returned to U.S. Navy 1946

General characteristics
- Displacement: 1,400 long tons (1,422 t)
- Length: 306 ft (93 m)
- Beam: 36.75 ft (11.2 m)
- Draught: 9 ft (2.7 m)
- Propulsion: Two Foster-Wheeler Express "D"-type water-tube boilers; GE 13,500 shp (10,070 kW) steam turbines and generators (9,200 kW); Electric motors for 12,000 shp (8,900 kW); Two shafts
- Speed: 24 knots (44 km/h)
- Range: 5,500 nautical miles (10,200 km) at 15 knots (28 km/h)
- Complement: 186
- Sensors & processing systems: SA & SL type radars; Type 144 series Asdic; MF Direction Finding antenna; HF Direction Finding Type FH 4 antenna
- Armament: 3 × 3 in (76 mm) /50 Mk.22 guns; 1 × twin Bofors 40 mm mount Mk.I; 7–16 × 20 mm Oerlikon guns; Mark 10 Hedgehog A/S projector; Depth charges; QF 2-pounder naval gun
- Notes: Pennant number K556

HMS Halsted (K556), ex-Russell, was a Captain-class frigate of the Buckley class of destroyer escort, originally intended for the United States Navy. Before she was finished in 1943, she was transferred to the Royal Navy under the terms of Lend-Lease, and saw service from 1943 to 1944 during World War II.

== Construction and transfer ==
The still-unnamed ship was laid down as the U.S. Navy destroyer escort DE-91 by Bethlehem-Hingham Shipyard, Inc., in Hingham, Massachusetts, on 28 July 1943 and was launched on 14 October 1943. She was allocated to the United Kingdom and received the British name Russell, but the British soon changed her name to Halsted (sometimes spelled Halstead). She was transferred to the United Kingdom upon completion on 3 November 1943.

== Service history ==
Commissioned into service in the Royal Navy as HMS Halsted (K556) on 3 November 1943 simultaneously with her transfer, the ship served on patrol and escort duty. On 11 June 1944, she was operating in the English Channel off Cherbourg, France, when German S-boats – known to the Allies as "E-boats" – and the torpedo boats Jaguar and Möwe of Nazi Germany's Kriegsmarine's 5th Torpedo Flotilla attacked her at about 0200. One torpedo struck her forward of her bridge, blowing off most of her bow and damaging her beyond economical repair.

Halsted was declared a constructive total loss and, instead of being returned to the U.S. Navy, was retained by the Royal Navy for spare parts.

== Disposal ==
The U.S. Navy struck Halsted from its Naval Vessel Register on 13 November 1944. The Royal Navy nominally returned her to the U.S. Navy in 1946. She was sold to a Dutch firm for scrapping on either 1 November 1946 or 28 March 1947 (sources vary) and was scrapped in the Netherlands.
