= Tilton on the Hill =

Village in Leicestershire, England

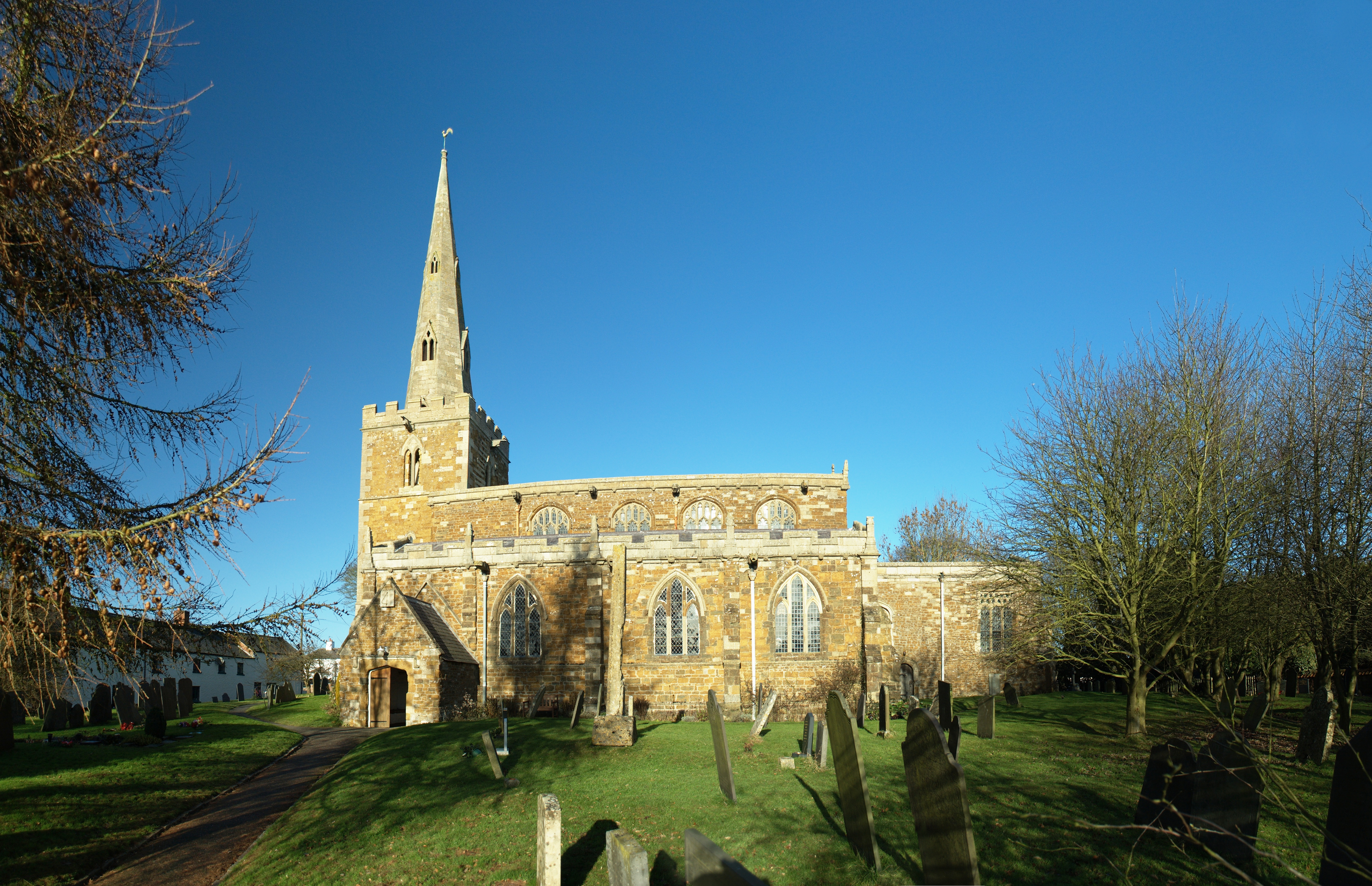
- Church of St Peter, Tilton on the Hill

- Location within Leicestershire
- Population: 601 (2011)
- OS grid reference: SK 742 057
  - London: 85.2 mi (137.1 km) South
- Civil parish: Tilton on the Hill and Halstead
- District: Harborough
- Shire county: Leicestershire
- Region: East Midlands
- Country: England
- Sovereign state: United Kingdom
- Post town: LEICESTER
- Postcode district: LE7
- Dialling code: 0116
- Police: Leicestershire
- Fire: Leicestershire
- Ambulance: East Midlands
- UK Parliament: Rutland and Stamford

Tilton on the Hill is a village and (as just Tilton) a former civil parish, now in the parish of Tilton on the Hill and Halstead in the Harborough district of Leicestershire. The population of the civil parish of Tilton on the Hill and Halstead at the 2011 census was 601. It lies 2 miles north of the A47, on the B6047 to Melton Mowbray. Halstead civil parish (grid reference SK750056) was merged with Tilton on 1 April 1935, while the deserted medieval village of Whatborough (SK772059) was merged in on 1 April 1994. Marefield remains a separate civil parish, but is part of the Tilton Electoral Ward. In 1931 the parish of Tilton (prior to the merges) had a population of 152. St Peter's Tilton, the Parish Church is in the parish of Halstead, as is the vicarage.

Tilton on the Hill is one of the highest places in East Leicestershire at 719 feet (219 m) above sea level, with the Mill House standing at the highest point. Whatborough is the highest summit in the eastern half of the county. The centre of the village was designated a Conservation Area in 1975, with the boundaries updated in 1994 and 2005.

In 2009, the village was named as the "Best Village in Leicestershire" in the Calor Village of the Year competition and also won Calor "Sustainability Village of the Year" for the Midlands.

== Services ==
The village has one public house called the Rose & Crown and one general store.

The Village Hall stands near the centre of the village.

The village's post office was replaced by an 'Outreach Service' in 2008, serving the village in the village hall on Monday and Wednesday afternoons 1.30 – 4.15pm

Tilton railway station on the Great Northern Railway was closed to passengers in 1953. The line continued to be used for freight for another ten years, mostly to take ore away from the iron ore quarry, which closed in 1961. The railway cutting is a Geological Site of Special Scientific Interest and is owned and managed by the Leicestershire and Rutland Wildlife Trust.

== Churches ==
There are two churches in Tilton on the Hill: St Peter's Tilton on the Hill (Church of England) and Halstead Methodist Chapel.

=== St Peter's Church ===
The first known mention of a religious establishment in Tilton is a reference in the Domesday Book of 1086 to a priest. Much of the current church dates to the 13th and 14th centuries, and is a landmark for miles around. In 1854 substantial restoration work was carried out, overseen by R.C. Hussey, which led to the removal of the gallery at the west end of the church, as well as the medieval chancel screen. New roofs were installed but the bosses and corbelheads are thought to be 15th-century originals, Also installed in 1854 were new flooring, pulpit, reading desk and open benches. The total cost was £1200. In 2014 the Church undertook a £193,000 repair of the bell-tower and spire.

St Peter's contains the tombs of Sir Johan de Diggebye and his wife, dated 1269. The tomb of Sir Everard Digby is dated 1509. In the Churchyard there is a medieval cross and the village memorial to those killed in World War I.

=== Halstead Methodist Chapel ===
A Methodist Society began in Halstead in 1811, and the Wesleyan chapel was built in 1813 on land let on a 99-year lease by T. Sikes esq. for a nominal 3 peppercorn rent. The chapel was enlarged in 1852, and a plaque on the front marks a further extension in 1866. It was renovated internally in the late 1980s. In the 19th century it was part of the Stamford and Rutland Circuit. It is now in the Leicester Trinity Methodist Circuit.

== Scheduled Ancient Monuments ==
There are 5 Scheduled Ancient Monuments in Tilton parish:

Image	S.A.M. Number	S.A.M. Description	coordinates & Grid reference
Pond on the east side of the moated site	17014	Moated site beside Loddington Road, Tilton. A square house platform with some grass-covered stonework, now heavily overgrown, is surrounded by a broad moat, water filled on the eastern side.	52.6393°N 0.90005°W; SK74530519
	105	Churchyard Cross. A 13th century cross base and shaft standing 2.4 metres (7.9 ft) high, in its original position in St Peter's churchyard.	52.64306°N 0.903353°W; SK743056
	106	Mound 220yds north-west of church, thought to be a mound for a windmill of either medieval or post-medieval date.	52.64532°N 0.904331°W; SK74230585
Robin a tiptoe Hill.	186	Defended enclosure on Robin-a-Tiptoe Hill of some 4.5 hectares (11 acres), possibly an Iron Age enclosure although the dating is uncertain.	52.6301°N 0.8593°W; SK773042
Whatborough Hill, near Tilton on the Hill	17090	Whatborough deserted medieval village	52.6456°N 0.86102°W; SK77160593

St Peter's Church is grade I listed, while a further 18 buildings are grade II listed

== Quarrying ==
Iron Ore was quarried to the east of Halstead on the north side of the Oakham Road between 1880 and about 1900, between 1912 and 1921 and between 1924 and 1961. Between 1880 and 1950 the quarries were on the west side of railway and from 1950 to 1961 on the east side. At first the ore was taken by standard gauge tramway to a tipping stage north of Tilton station where it was tipped into railway wagons in sidings. Horses pulled wagons on the tramway. From 1912 a narrow-gauge tramway was used, still with horse haulage. Steam locomotives replaced the horses in 1928 which operated until 1950 . When the new quarries in the east of the railway were opened in that year and the old tramway closed, the ore was taken to the tipping dock by lorries which crossed over the railway by a new Bailey Bridge. Quarrying was done by hand with the aid of explosives until 1933 when a petrol paraffin machine was brought in. From 1936 diesel machines were used.

The main visible remains of the quarry operation are the final gullet on the west side (dating from 1950) near Halstead House, the tipping dock, the supports of the former Bailey bridge and traces of the lorry road leading to it.

== Helicopter crash ==
In 1999, an army Lynx helicopter on a training flight from Dishforth Airfield in North Yorkshire crashed, killing 3 of the four people on board. The aircraft had had problems before the accident, and the families claimed the specific aircraft had had a history of failures. In 2018, a memorial flight of four Lynx helicopters flew over the site.
