= Leicester Belgrave Road railway station =

Former railway station in Leicestershire, England

Leicester Belgrave Road
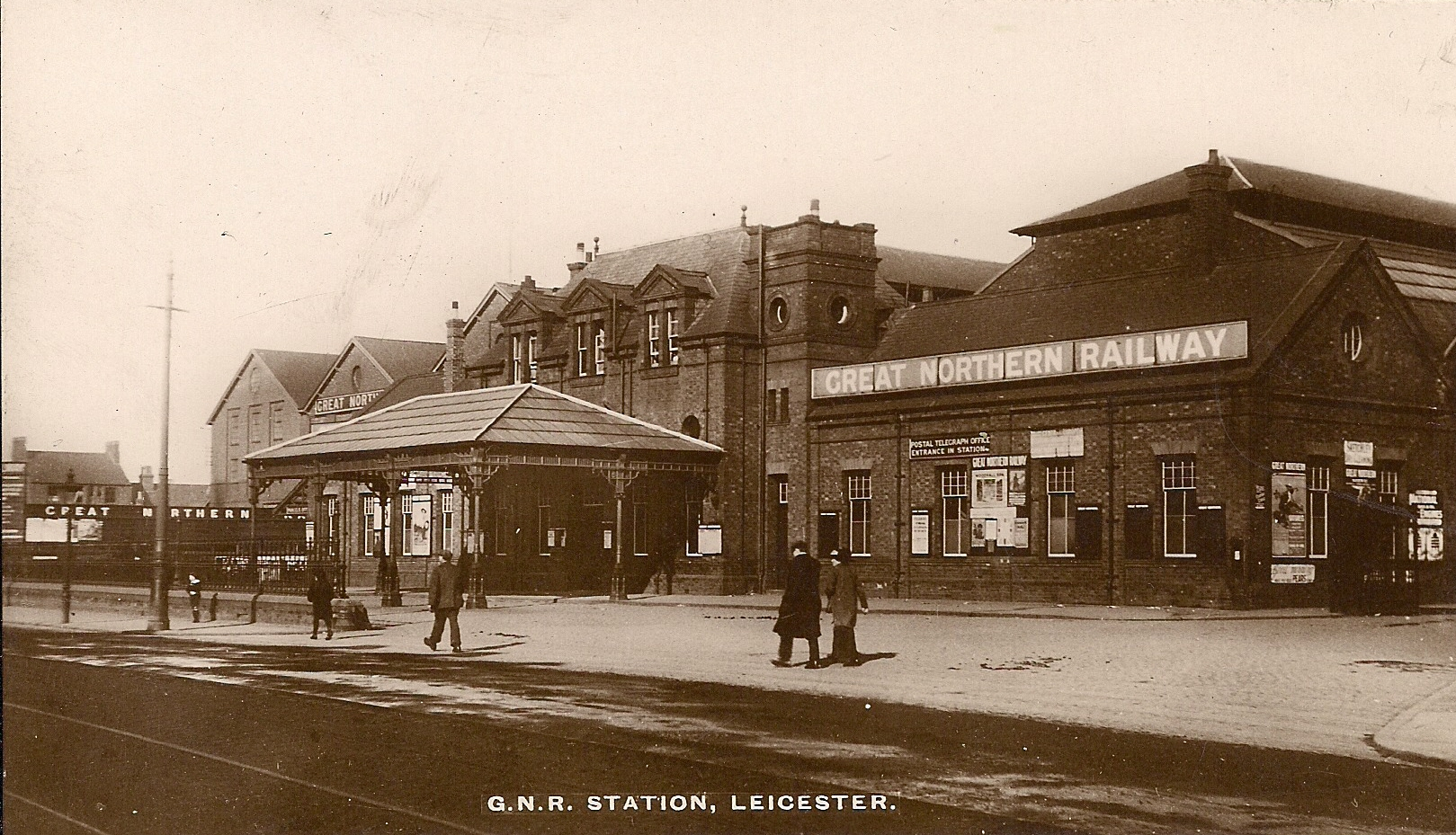

General information
- Location: Leicester, Leicestershire, England
- Coordinates: 52.6453°N 1.1250°W
- Grid reference: SK592057
- Platforms: 5

Other information
- Status: Disused

History
- Pre-grouping: Great Northern Railway
- Post-grouping: London and North Eastern Railway

Key dates
- 1 January 1883: Opened
- 7 December 1953: Closed to regular services
- 9 September 1962: Closed to summer specials
- May 1964: completely closed
Location

Leicester Belgrave Road was one of three railway stations that served the city of Leicester, in Leicestershire, England. It was the terminus of the Great Northern Railway's branch line from the Great Northern and London and North Western Joint Railway at Marefield Junction.

== Opening ==
The station opened on 1 January 1883. Marefield Junction was triangular and allowed through running north or south.

== Services ==
The main services from Leicester were to Peterborough and Grantham. The station was also well provided in summer with specials, especially to Skegness and Mablethorpe.

The Peterborough trains were stopped as a war economy in 1916. Local traffic was never heavy and, by 1950, there were only two Grantham trains remaining, one of which was a semi-fast with limited stops which connected with the Flying Scotsman at Grantham. This service was withdrawn in 1951; the remaining stopping train survived until the end of regular services over the joint line in 1953.

Summer specials continued to run until 1962, in the later years with severe speed restrictions on the Leicester branch.. Freight trains continued to serve the station until 1964 when it was completely closed.

Preceding station	Disused railways	Following station
Terminus	Great Northern Railway; Leicester Belgrave Road to Grantham	Humberstone; Line and station closed
Terminus	Great Northern Railway; Leicester Belgrave Road to Peterborough North	Humberstone; Line and station closed

=== Sample timetable for April 1910 ===
The table below shows the train departures from Leicester Belgrave Road in April 1910:

Departure	Going to	Calling at	Arrival	Operator
07.00	Peterborough North	Humberstone, Thurnby & Scraptoft, Ingersby, Loseby, Tilton, East Norton, Hallaton, Medbourne, Rockingham, Seaton, Wakerley & Barrowden, King's Cliffe, Nassington, Wansford, Castor, Overton	08.48	GNR
07.30	Grantham	Humberstone, Thurnby & Scraptoft, Ingersby, Loseby, John O'Gaunt, Great Dalby, Melton Mowbray North, Scalford, Long Clawson & Hose, Harby & Stathern, Redmile, Bottesford, Sedgebrook	09.10	GNR
09.00	Grantham	Humberstone, Thurnby & Scraptoft, Ingersby, Loseby, John O'Gaunt, Great Dalby, Melton Mowbray North, Scalford, Long Clawson & Hose, Harby & Stathern, Redmile, Bottesford	10.28	GNR
09.45	Newark Northgate	Humberstone, Thurnby & Scraptoft, Ingersby, Loseby, John O'Gaunt, Great Dalby, Melton Mowbray North, Scalford, Long Clawson & Hose, Harby & Stathern, Redmile, Cotham	11.10	GNR
10.15	Peterborough North	Humberstone, Thurnby & Scraptoft, Ingersby, Loseby, Tilton, East Norton, Hallaton, Medbourne, Rockingham, Seaton, Wakerley & Barrowden, King's Cliffe, Nassington, Wansford, Castor, Overton	12.06	GNR
11.10	Grantham	Humberstone, Thurnby & Scraptoft, Ingersby, Loseby, John O'Gaunt, Great Dalby, Melton Mowbray North, Scalford, Long Clawson & Hose, Harby & Stathern (Mon, Wed, Sat only)	12.50	GNR
12.40	Grantham	Humberstone, Thurnby & Scraptoft, Ingersby, Loseby, John O'Gaunt, Great Dalby, Melton Mowbray North, Scalford, Long Clawson & Hose, Harby & Stathern, Redmile, Bottesford, Sedgebrook	14.12	GNR
15.45	Grantham	Humberstone, Thurnby & Scraptoft, Ingersby, Loseby, John O'Gaunt, Great Dalby, Melton Mowbray North, Scalford, Long Clawson & Hose, Harby & Stathern, Redmile, Bottesford, Sedgebrook	17.15	GNR
16.00	Peterborough North	Humberstone, Thurnby & Scraptoft, Ingersby, Loseby, Tilton, East Norton, Hallaton, Medbourne, Rockingham, Seaton, Wakerley & Barrowden, King's Cliffe, Nassington, Wansford, Castor	17.46	GNR
17.45	Grantham	Humberstone, Thurnby & Scraptoft, Ingersby, Loseby, John O'Gaunt, Great Dalby, Melton Mowbray North, Scalford, Long Clawson & Hose, Harby & Stathern, Redmile, Bottesford	19.15	GNR
18.40	Loseby	Humberstone, Thurnby & Scraptoft, Ingersby (Wed, Sat excepted)	19.01	GNR
18.40	Tilton	Humberstone, Thurnby & Scraptoft, Ingersby, Loseby (Wed, Sat only)	19.06	GNR
20.20	Loseby	Humberstone, Thurnby & Scraptoft, Ingersby (Wed, Sat excepted)	20.42	GNR
22.45	Grantham	Thurnby & Scraptoft, Melton Mowbray North, Harby & Stathern (Sat excepted)	23.52	GNR
23.00	Melton Mowbray North	Humberstone, Thurnby & Scraptoft, Ingersby, Loseby, John O'Gaunt	23.38	GNR

== Closure ==
The line closed in 1962, but various depots continued in use for a few years using a reinstated connection with the Midland Railway which had last been used for materials delivery during construction. The last of these, Catherine Street oil depot, closed on 1 January 1969.

== The site today ==
The station site has been since been developed as a supermarket and adjoining car park.
