= List of civil parishes in Leicestershire =

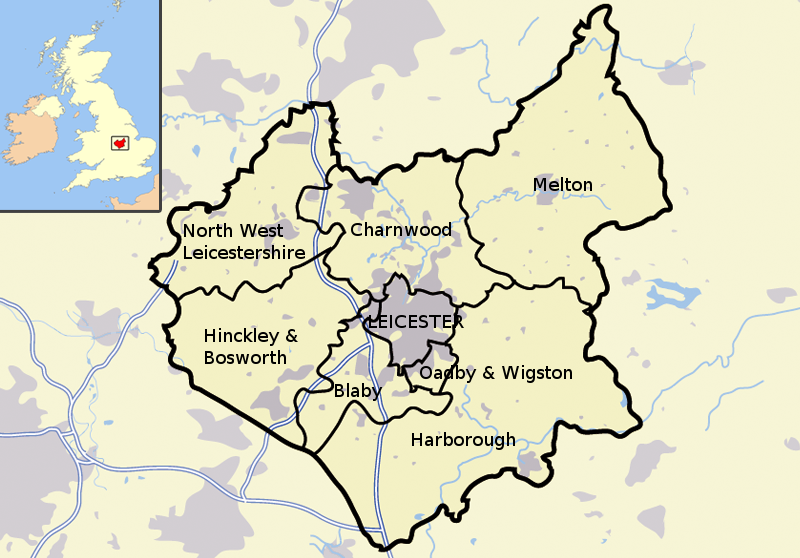
Leicestershire districts and boroughs

This is a list of civil parishes in the ceremonial county of Leicestershire, England. There are 233 civil parishes.

Population figures are unavailable for some of the smallest parishes.

The districts of Leicester and Oadby and Wigston (Oadby and Wigston) are entirely unparished. Coalville, Hinckley, Loughborough, Market Harborough and Melton Mowbray are also unparished.

Civil Parish	Civil Parish Population 2011	Area (km^{2}) 2011	Pre 1974 District	District
Ab Kettleby	529	12.69	Melton and Belvoir Rural District	Melton
Allexton			Billesdon Rural District	Harborough
Anstey	6,528	4.97	Barrow upon Soar Rural District	Charnwood
Appleby Magna	1,084	11.50	Ashby de la Zouch Rural District	North West Leicestershire
Arnesby	357	5.72	Lutterworth Rural District	Harborough
Asfordby	3,286	10.58	Melton and Belvoir Rural District	Melton
Ashby Magna	347	7.83	Lutterworth Rural District	Harborough
Ashby Parva	233	5.54	Lutterworth Rural District	Harborough
Ashby Woulds (town)	3,763	9.95	Ashby Woulds Urban District	North West Leicestershire
Ashby-de-la-Zouch (town)	13,689	23.27	Ashby de la Zouch Urban District	North West Leicestershire
Aston Flamville	241	6.08	Blaby Rural District	Blaby
Bagworth and Thornton	2,605	17.46	Market Bosworth Rural District	Hinckley and Bosworth
Bardon			Ashby de la Zouch Rural District	North West Leicestershire
Barkby Thorpe			Barrow upon Soar Rural District	Charnwood
Barkby	316	8.42	Barrow upon Soar Rural District	Charnwood
Barlestone	2,481	4.35	Market Bosworth Rural District	Hinckley and Bosworth
Barrow upon Soar	5,956	10.09	Barrow upon Soar Rural District	Charnwood
Barwell	9,022	8.53	Hinckley Urban District	Hinckley and Bosworth
Beeby	115	9.68	Barrow upon Soar Rural District	Charnwood
Belton	734	9.70	Castle Donington Rural District	North West Leicestershire
Belvoir	263	13.93	Melton and Belvoir Rural District	Melton
Billesdon	901	8.68	Billesdon Rural District	Harborough
Birstall	12,216	6.01	Barrow upon Soar Rural District	Charnwood
Bitteswell with Bittesby	554	10.64	Lutterworth Rural District	Harborough
Blaby	6,194	4.92	Blaby Rural District	Blaby
Blaston			Market Harborough Rural District	Harborough
Bottesford	3,587	27.00	Melton and Belvoir Rural District	Melton
Braunstone (town)	16,850	4.96	Blaby Rural District	Blaby
Breedon on the Hill	1,029	17.17	Castle Donington Rural District	North West Leicestershire
Bringhurst			Market Harborough Rural District	Harborough
Broughton and Old Dalby	1,405	21.99	Melton and Belvoir Rural District	Melton
Broughton Astley	8,940	9.99	Lutterworth Rural District	Harborough
Bruntingthorpe	425	5.11	Lutterworth Rural District	Harborough
Buckminster	356	12.51	Melton and Belvoir Rural District	Melton
Burbage	14,568	12.57	Hinckley Urban District	Hinckley and Bosworth
Burton and Dalby	985	26.24		Melton
Burton on the Wolds	1,218	14.54	Barrow upon Soar Rural District	Charnwood
Burton Overy	440	17.73	Billesdon Rural District	Harborough
Cadeby	169	4.08	Market Bosworth Rural District	Hinckley and Bosworth
Carlton Curlieu	305	3.10	Billesdon Rural District	Harborough
Carlton			Market Bosworth Rural District	Hinckley and Bosworth
Castle Donington	6,416	13.86	Castle Donington Rural District	North West Leicestershire
Catthorpe	173	2.57	Lutterworth Rural District	Harborough
Charley	236	13.22	Castle Donington Rural District	North West Leicestershire
Chilcote	200	9.51	Ashby de la Zouch Rural District	North West Leicestershire
Clawson, Hose and Harby	2,577	32.25	Melton and Belvoir Rural District	Melton
Claybrooke Magna	616	4.42	Lutterworth Rural District	Harborough
Claybrooke Parva	208	2.29	Lutterworth Rural District	Harborough
Cold Newton			Billesdon Rural District	Harborough
Coleorton	1,177	9.16	Ashby de la Zouch Rural District	North West Leicestershire
Cosby	3,506	8.57	Blaby Rural District	Blaby
Cossington	598	6.24	Barrow upon Soar Rural District	Charnwood
Cotes			Barrow upon Soar Rural District	Charnwood
Cotesbach	204	4.93	Lutterworth Rural District	Harborough
Countesthorpe	6,377	5.02	Blaby Rural District	Blaby
Cranoe			Market Harborough Rural District	Harborough
Croft	1,639	6.47	Blaby Rural District	Blaby
Croxton Kerrial	530	20.91	Melton and Belvoir Rural District	Melton
Dadlington and Sutton Cheney	538	17.42	Market Bosworth Rural District	Hinckley and Bosworth
Desford	3,930	13.82	Market Bosworth Rural District	Hinckley and Bosworth
Drayton	254	5.06	Market Harborough Rural District	Harborough
Dunton Bassett	759	5.50	Lutterworth Rural District	Harborough
Earl Shilton (town)	10,047	8.20	Hinckley Urban District	Hinckley and Bosworth
East Goscote	2,866	1.88	Barrow upon Soar Rural District	Charnwood
East Langton	393	4.27	Market Harborough Rural District	Harborough
East Norton			Billesdon Rural District	Harborough
Eaton	648	19.33	Melton and Belvoir Rural District	Melton
Ellistown and Battleflat	2,626	4.98	Coalville Urban District	North West Leicestershire
Elmesthorpe	509	5.30	Blaby Rural District	Blaby
Enderby	6,314	12.29	Blaby Rural District	Blaby
Fleckney	4,894	5.13	Market Harborough Rural District	Harborough
Foxton	478	6.63	Market Harborough Rural District	Harborough
Freeby	244	26.15	Melton and Belvoir Rural District	Melton
Frisby on the Wreake	557	6.38	Melton and Belvoir Rural District	Melton
Frisby			Billesdon Rural District	Harborough
Frolesworth	274	6.15	Lutterworth Rural District	Harborough
Gaddesby	762	18.90	Melton and Belvoir Rural District	Melton
Garthorpe			Melton and Belvoir Rural District	Melton
Gaulby	241	11.79	Billesdon Rural District	Harborough
Gilmorton	976	10.00	Lutterworth Rural District	Harborough
Glen Parva	6,189	2.92	Blaby Rural District	Blaby
Glenfields	9,643	5.07	Blaby Rural District	Blaby
Glooston	147	12.11	Market Harborough Rural District	Harborough
Goadby			Billesdon Rural District	Harborough
Great Bowden	1,017	8.02	Market Harborough Urban District	Harborough
Great Easton	671	9.25	Market Harborough Rural District	Harborough
Great Glen	3,662	9.27	Billesdon Rural District	Harborough
Grimston	294	12.48	Melton and Belvoir Rural District	Melton
Groby	7,389	8.67	Market Bosworth Rural District	Hinckley and Bosworth
Gumley	209	10.09	Market Harborough Rural District	Harborough
Hallaton	594	11.99	Market Harborough Rural District	Harborough
Hamilton Lea			Barrow upon Soar Rural District	Charnwood
Hathern	1,866	7.08	Loughborough Municipal Borough	Charnwood
Heather	920	4.84	Ashby de la Zouch Rural District	North West Leicestershire
Higham on the Hill	840	12.00	Market Bosworth Rural District	Hinckley and Bosworth
Hoby with Rotherby	556	19.41	Melton and Belvoir Rural District	Melton
Horninghold	316	24.62	Market Harborough Rural District	Harborough
Hoton	353	7.67	Barrow upon Soar Rural District	Charnwood
Houghton on the Hill	1,524	7.73	Billesdon Rural District	Harborough
Hugglescote and Donington le Heath	4,446	4.91	Coalville Urban District	North West Leicestershire
Huncote	1,756	4.26	Blaby Rural District	Blaby
Hungarton	283	14.55	Billesdon Rural District	Harborough
Husbands Bosworth	1,145	14.39	Market Harborough Rural District	Harborough
Ibstock	6,201	9.98	Market Bosworth Rural District	North West Leicestershire
Illston on the Hill	179	5.51	Billesdon Rural District	Harborough
Isley cum Langley			Castle Donington Rural District	North West Leicestershire
Kegworth	3,601	9.23	Castle Donington Rural District	North West Leicestershire
Keyham	124	3.80	Billesdon Rural District	Harborough
Kibworth Beauchamp	4,065	5.30	Market Harborough Rural District	Harborough
Kibworth Harcourt	1,368	5.96	Market Harborough Rural District	Harborough
Kilby	270	9.70	Blaby Rural District	Blaby
Kimcote and Walton	600	12.50	Lutterworth Rural District	Harborough
King's Norton			Billesdon Rural District	Harborough
Kirby Bellars	369	10.88	Melton and Belvoir Rural District	Melton
Kirkby Mallory, Peckleton and Stapleton	1,067	22.01	Market Bosworth Rural District	Hinckley and Bosworth
Kirby Muxloe	4,667	7.16	Blaby Rural District	Blaby
Knaptoft			Lutterworth Rural District	Harborough
Knossington and Cold Overton	316	12.93	Melton and Belvoir Rural District	Melton
Laughton			Market Harborough Rural District	Harborough
Launde			Billesdon Rural District	Harborough
Leicester Forest East	6,719	2.52	Blaby Rural District	Blaby
Leicester Forest West			Blaby Rural District	Blaby
Leire	587	4.48	Lutterworth Rural District	Harborough
Little Stretton			Billesdon Rural District	Harborough
Lockington-Hemington	838	13.43	Castle Donington Rural District	North West Leicestershire
Loddington	230	20.31	Billesdon Rural District	Harborough
Long Whatton and Diseworth	1,760	19.42	Castle Donington Rural District	North West Leicestershire
Lowesby	127	12.06	Billesdon Rural District	Harborough
Lubbesthorpe			Blaby Rural District	Blaby
Lubenham	1,737	10.60	Market Harborough Rural District	Harborough
Lutterworth (town)	9,353	11.02	Lutterworth Rural District	Harborough
Marefield			Billesdon Rural District	Harborough
Market Bosworth	2,097	10.80	Market Bosworth Rural District	Hinckley and Bosworth
Markfield	4,454	8.82	Market Bosworth Rural District	Hinckley and Bosworth
Measham	5,209	7.07	Ashby de la Zouch Rural District	North West Leicestershire
Medbourne	473	7.50	Market Harborough Rural District	Harborough
Misterton with Walcote	486	15.27	Lutterworth Rural District	Harborough
Mountsorrel	8,223	4.15	Barrow upon Soar Rural District	Charnwood
Mowsley	302	11.03	Market Harborough Rural District	Harborough
Nailstone	514	7.68	Market Bosworth Rural District	Hinckley and Bosworth
Narborough	8,448	5.73	Blaby Rural District	Blaby
Nevill Holt			Market Harborough Rural District	Harborough
Newbold Verdon	3,012	8.09	Market Bosworth Rural District	Hinckley and Bosworth
Newtown Linford	1,103	23.50	Barrow upon Soar Rural District	Charnwood
Normanton le Heath	165	5.53	Ashby de la Zouch Rural District	North West Leicestershire
North Kilworth	597	8.50	Lutterworth Rural District	Harborough
Noseley	204	13.58	Billesdon Rural District	Harborough
Oakthorpe, Donisthorpe and Acresford	2,637	7.35	Ashby de la Zouch Rural District	North West Leicestershire
Osbaston	255	5.35	Market Bosworth Rural District	Hinckley and Bosworth
Osgathorpe	411	5.42	Ashby de la Zouch Rural District	North West Leicestershire
Owston and Newbold	112	14.53	Billesdon Rural District	Harborough
Packington	734	7.73	Ashby de la Zouch Rural District	North West Leicestershire
Peatling Magna	210	7.52	Lutterworth Rural District	Harborough
Peatling Parva	189	3.90	Lutterworth Rural District	Harborough
Potters Marston			Blaby Rural District	Blaby
Prestwold			Barrow upon Soar Rural District	Charnwood
Queniborough	2,326	8.04	Barrow upon Soar Rural District	Charnwood
Quorn	5,177	8.88	Barrow upon Soar Rural District	Charnwood
Ratby	4,468	8.75	Market Bosworth Rural District	Hinckley and Bosworth
Ratcliffe on the Wreake	179	3.31	Barrow upon Soar Rural District	Charnwood
Ravenstone with Snibston	2,212	7.13	Ashby de la Zouch Rural District	North West Leicestershire
Rearsby	1,097	6.00	Barrow upon Soar Rural District	Charnwood
Redmile	921	19.34	Melton and Belvoir Rural District	Melton
Rolleston			Billesdon Rural District	Harborough
Rothley	3,897	7.70	Barrow upon Soar Rural District	Charnwood
Saddington	309	7.09	Market Harborough Rural District	Harborough
Sapcote	2,442	6.33	Blaby Rural District	Blaby
Scalford	608	13.33	Melton and Belvoir Rural District	Melton
Scraptoft	1,804	5.31	Billesdon Rural District	Harborough
Seagrave	546	10.16	Barrow upon Soar Rural District	Charnwood
Shackerstone	921	18.97	Market Bosworth Rural District	Hinckley and Bosworth
Shangton			Market Harborough Rural District	Harborough
Sharnford	985	5.81	Blaby Rural District	Blaby
Shawell	162	5.57	Lutterworth Rural District	Harborough
Shearsby	240	4.56	Lutterworth Rural District	Harborough
Sheepy	1,174	30.90	Market Bosworth Rural District	Hinckley and Bosworth
Shepshed (town)	13,505	18.11	Shepshed Urban District	Charnwood
Sileby	7,835	9.27	Barrow upon Soar Rural District	Charnwood
Skeffington	223	8.85	Billesdon Rural District	Harborough
Slawston	191	11.24	Market Harborough Rural District	Harborough
Smeeton Westerby	357	5.62	Market Harborough Rural District	Harborough
Snarestone	312	5.40	Ashby de la Zouch Rural District	North West Leicestershire
Somerby	812	21.78	Melton and Belvoir Rural District	Melton
South Croxton	261	6.71	Barrow upon Soar Rural District	Charnwood
South Kilworth	513	6.00	Lutterworth Rural District	Harborough
Sproxton	658	44.17	Melton and Belvoir Rural District	Melton
Stanton under Bardon	634	6.07	Market Bosworth Rural District	Hinckley and Bosworth
Stathern	728	8.66	Melton and Belvoir Rural District	Melton
Staunton Harold	141	6.87	Ashby de la Zouch Rural District	North West Leicestershire
Stockerston			Market Harborough Rural District	Harborough
Stoke Golding	1,684	3.55	Hinckley Urban District	Hinckley and Bosworth
Stonebow Village				Charnwood
Stoney Stanton	3,793	6.30	Blaby Rural District	Blaby
Stonton Wyville			Market Harborough Rural District	Harborough
Stoughton	351	6.11	Billesdon Rural District	Harborough
Stretton en le Field			Ashby de la Zouch Rural District	North West Leicestershire
Swannington	1,270	4.69	Ashby de la Zouch Rural District	North West Leicestershire
Swepstone and Newton Burgoland	656	8.69	Ashby de la Zouch Rural District	North West Leicestershire
Swinford	586	12.54	Lutterworth Rural District	Harborough
Swithland	217	4.69	Barrow upon Soar Rural District	Charnwood
Syston (town)	12,804	6.92	Barrow upon Soar Rural District	Charnwood
Theddingworth	216	6.59	Market Harborough Rural District	Harborough
Thorpe Astley			Blaby Rural District	Blaby
Thorpe Langton	200	4.21	Market Harborough Rural District	Harborough
Thrussington	581	8.21	Barrow upon Soar Rural District	Charnwood
Thurcaston and Cropston	2,074	5.15	Barrow upon Soar Rural District	Charnwood
Thurlaston	807	12.57	Blaby Rural District	Blaby
Thurmaston	9,668	4.67	Barrow upon Soar Rural District	Charnwood
Thurnby and Bushby	3,301	4.16	Billesdon Rural District	Harborough
Tilton on the Hill and Halstead	601	13.94	Billesdon Rural District	Harborough
Tugby and Keythorpe	330	8.93	Billesdon Rural District	Harborough
Tur Langton	316	10.84	Market Harborough Rural District	Harborough
Twycross	850	25.11	Market Bosworth Rural District	Hinckley and Bosworth
Twyford and Thorpe	628	10.41	Melton and Belvoir Rural District	Melton
Ullesthorpe	903	6.02	Lutterworth Rural District	Harborough
Ulverscroft			Barrow upon Soar Rural District	Charnwood
Waltham and Thorpe Arnold	967	16.93	Melton and Belvoir Rural District	Melton
Walton on the Wolds	288	6.26	Barrow upon Soar Rural District	Charnwood
Wanlip	305	1.17	Barrow upon Soar Rural District	Charnwood
Welham			Market Harborough Rural District	Harborough
West Langton	124	4.10	Market Harborough Rural District	Harborough
Westrill and Starmore			Lutterworth Rural District	Harborough
Whetstone	6,566	8.48	Blaby Rural District	Blaby
Whitwick	8,612	6.71	Coalville Urban District	North West Leicestershire
Wigston Parva			Blaby Rural District	Blaby
Willoughby Waterleys	327	4.72	Lutterworth Rural District	Harborough
Wistow	256	8.25	Billesdon Rural District	Harborough
Withcote			Billesdon Rural District	Harborough
Witherley	1,373	15.73	Market Bosworth Rural District	Hinckley and Bosworth
Woodhouse	2,319	13.12	Barrow upon Soar Rural District	Charnwood
Worthington	1,461	8.53	Ashby de la Zouch Rural District	North West Leicestershire
Wymeswold	1,296	16.33	Barrow upon Soar Rural District	Charnwood
Wymondham and Edmondthorpe	632	19.13	Melton and Belvoir Rural District	Melton

== See also ==
- List of civil parishes in England
