= List of rural sanitary districts in England and Wales 1875–1894 =

The following is a list of the areas in England and Wales which became rural sanitary districts when the Public Health Act 1875 (38 & 39 Vict. c. 55) came into force in 1875. Sanitary districts were based on poor law unions, and frequently contained areas in more than one county.
Note for table: 'RSD' stands for Rural Sanitary District, 'LGD' stands for Local Government District, 'MB' stands for Municipal Borough and 'CB' stands for County Borough.

== 1875 ==
Rural Sanitary District	County	Created	Abolished	Successor(s)
Anglesey RSD	Anglesey	1875	1894	Twrcelyn RD
Holyhead RSD	Anglesey	1875	1894	Valley RD
Bangor RSD	Anglesey and Caernarfonshire	1875	1894	Aethwy RD and Ogwen RD
Carnarvon RSD	Anglesey and Caernarfonshire	1875	1894	Dwyran RD and Gwyrfai RD
Bedford RSD	Bedfordshire	1875	1894	Bedford RD
Biggleswade RSD	Bedfordshire	1875	1894	Biggleswade RD
Woburn RSD	Bedfordshire	1875	1894	Woburn RD
Leighton Buzzard RSD	Bedfordshire and Buckinghamshire	1875	1894	Eaton Bray RD and Wing RD
Ampthill RSD	Bedfordshire and Hertfordshire	1875	1894	Ampthill RD
Hitchin RSD	Bedfordshire and Hertfordshire	1875	1894	Hitchin RD
Luton RSD	Bedfordshire and Hertfordshire	1875	1894	Kensworth RD, Luton RD and Studham RD
Wellingborough RSD	Bedfordshire and Northamptonshire	1875	1894	Bedford RD and Wellingborough RD
St Neots RSD	Bedfordshire, Cambridgeshire and Huntingdonshire	1875	1894	Caxton and Arrington RD, Eaton Socon RD and St Neots RD
Cookham RSD	Berkshire	1875	1894	Cookham RD
Easthampstead RSD	Berkshire	1875	1894	Easthampstead RD
Wantage RSD	Berkshire	1875	1894	Wantage RD
Wokingham RSD	Berkshire	1875	1894	Wokingham RD
Newbury RSD	Berkshire and Hampshire	1875	1894	Kingsclere RD and Newbury RD
Abingdon RSD	Berkshire and Oxfordshire	1875	1894	Abingdon RD and Culham RD
Bradfield RSD	Berkshire and Oxfordshire	1875	1894	Bradfield RD and Goring RD
Wallingford RSD	Berkshire and Oxfordshire	1875	1894	Crowmarsh RD and Wallingford RD
Windsor RSD	Berkshire and Surrey	1875	1894	Egham RD and Windsor RD
Hungerford RSD	Berkshire and Wiltshire	1875	1894	Hungerford RD and Ramsbury RD
Faringdon RSD	Berkshire, Gloucestershire and Oxfordshire	1875	1894	Faringdon RD and Witney RD
Brecknock RSD	Brecknockshire	1875	1894	Brecknock RD
Crickhowell RSD	Brecknockshire	1875	1894	Crickhowell RD
Llandovery RSD	Brecknockshire and Carmarthenshire	1875	1894	Builth RD and Llandovery RD
Merthyr Tydfil RSD	Brecknockshire and Glamorganshire	1875	1894	Gelligaer and Rhigos RD and Vaynor and Penderyn RD
Neath RSD	Brecknockshire and Glamorganshire	1875	1894	Neath RD
Pontardawe RSD	Brecknockshire and Glamorganshire	1875	1894	Pontardawe RD and Ystradgynlais RD
Builth RSD	Brecknockshire and Radnorshire	1875	1894	Builth RD and Colwyn RD
Rhayader RSD	Brecknockshire and Radnorshire	1875	1894	Rhayader RD
Hay RSD	Brecknockshire, Herefordshire and Radnorshire	1875	1894	Bredwardine RD, Hay RD and Painscastle RD
Amersham RSD	Buckinghamshire	1875	1894	Amersham RD
Aylesbury RSD	Buckinghamshire	1875	1894	Aylesbury RD
Buckingham RSD	Buckinghamshire	1875	1894	Buckingham RD
Eton RSD	Buckinghamshire	1875	1894	Eton RD
Newport Pagnell RSD	Buckinghamshire	1875	1894	Newport Pagnell RD
Winslow RSD	Buckinghamshire	1875	1894	Winslow RD
Berkhampstead RSD	Buckinghamshire and Hertfordshire	1875	1894	Berkhampstead RD and Wing RD
Potterspury RSD	Buckinghamshire and Northamptonshire	1875	1894	Potterspury RD and Stratford and Wolverton RD
Bicester RSD	Buckinghamshire and Oxfordshire	1875	1894	Bicester RD and Long Crendon RD
Henley RSD	Buckinghamshire and Oxfordshire	1875	1894	Hambleden RD and Henley RD
Thame RSD	Buckinghamshire and Oxfordshire	1875	1894	Long Crendon RD and Thame RD
Wycombe RSD	Buckinghamshire and Oxfordshire	1875	1894	Thame RD and Wycombe RD
Brackley RSD	Buckinghamshire, Northamptonshire and Oxfordshire	1875	1894	Bicester RD, Brackley RD and Buckingham RD
Pwllheli RSD	Caernarfonshire	1875	1894	Lleyn RD
Conway RSD	Caernarfonshire and Denbighshire	1875	1894	Conway RD
Llanrwst RSD	Caernarfonshire and Denbighshire	1875	1894	Geirionydd RD and Llanrwst RD
Ffestiniog RSD	Caernarfonshire and Merionethshire	1875	1894	Deudraeth RD and Glaslyn RD
Chesterton RSD	Cambridgeshire	1875	1894	Chesterton RD
Linton RSD	Cambridgeshire	1875	1894	Linton RD
North Witchford RSD	Cambridgeshire (1875–89), Isle of Ely (1889–94)	1875	1894	North Witchford RD
Whittlesey RSD	Cambridgeshire (1875–89), Isle of Ely (1889–94)	1875	1894	Whittlesey RD
Caxton RSD	Cambridgeshire and Huntingdonshire	1875	1894	Caxton and Arrington RD and St Neots RD
St Ives RSD	Cambridgeshire and Huntingdonshire	1875	1894	St Ives RD and Swavesey RD
Downham RSD	Cambridgeshire and Norfolk (1875–89), Isle of Ely and Norfolk (1889–94)	1875	1894	Downham RD and West Welney RD
Ely RSD	Cambridgeshire and Norfolk (1875–89), Isle of Ely and Norfolk (1889–94)	1875	1894	Ely RD and Redmere RD
Wisbech RSD	Cambridgeshire and Norfolk (1875–89), Isle of Ely and Norfolk (1889–94)	1875	1894	Marshland RD and Wisbech RD
Newmarket RSD	Cambridgeshire and Suffolk (1875–89), Cambridgeshire and West Suffolk (1889–94)	1875	1894	Moulton RD and Newmarket RD
Royston RSD	Cambridgeshire, Essex and Hertfordshire	1875	1894	Ashwell RD and Melbourn RD
Peterborough RSD	Cambridgeshire, Huntingdonshire, Lincolnshire and Northamptonshire (1875–89), Huntingdonshire, Isle of Ely, Lincolnshire, Parts of Holland and Soke of Peterborough (1889–94)	1875	1894	Crowland RD, Norman Cross RD, Peterborough RD and Thorney RD
Aberayron RSD	Cardiganshire	1875	1894	Aberayron RD
Aberystwyth RSD	Cardiganshire	1875	1894	Aberystwyth RD
Tregaron RSD	Cardiganshire	1875	1894	Tregaron RD
Lampeter RSD	Cardiganshire and Carmarthenshire	1875	1894	Lampeter RD and Llanybyther RD
Cardigan RSD	Cardiganshire and Pembrokeshire	1875	1894	Cardigan RD and St Dogmells RD
Newcastle in Emlyn RSD	Cardiganshire, Carmarthenshire and Pembrokeshire	1875	1894	Llandyssil RD, Llanfyrnach RD and Newcastle in Emlyn RD
Machynlleth RSD	Cardiganshire, Merionethshire and Montgomeryshire	1875	1894	Machynlleth RD
Carmarthen RSD	Carmarthenshire	1875	1894	Carmarthen RD
Llandilofawr RSD	Carmarthenshire	1875	1894	Llandillofawr RD
Llanelly RSD	Carmarthenshire and Glamorganshire	1875	1894	Llanelly RD and Llangyfelach RD
Narberth RSD	Carmarthenshire and Pembrokeshire	1875	1894	Narberth RD and Whitland RD
Altrincham RSD	Cheshire	1875	1894	Altrincham RD
Birkenhead RSD	Cheshire	1875	1894	Wirral RD
Congleton RSD	Cheshire	1875	1894	Congleton RD
Hawarden RSD	Cheshire	1875	1894	Chester RD
Macclesfield RSD	Cheshire	1875	1894	Macclesfield RD
Nantwich RSD	Cheshire	1875	1894	Nantwich RD
Northwich RSD	Cheshire	1875	1894	Northwich RD
Runcorn RSD	Cheshire	1875	1894	Runcorn RD
Stockport RSD	Cheshire	1875	1894	Stockport RD
Tarvin RSD	Cheshire	1875	1894	Tarvin RD
Wirral RSD	Cheshire	1875	1894	Wirral RD
Hayfield RSD	Cheshire and Derbyshire	1875	1894	Disley RD and Hayfield RD
Chester RSD	Cheshire and Flintshire	1875	1894	Chester RD and Hawarden RD
Ashton-under-Lyne RSD	Cheshire and Lancashire	1875	1894	Limehurst RD and Tintwistle RD
Warrington RSD	Cheshire and Lancashire	1875	1894	Runcorn RD and Warrington RD
Market Drayton RSD	Cheshire, Shropshire and Staffordshire	1875	1894	Blore Heath RD, Drayton RD and Tittenley RD
Bodmin RSD	Cornwall	1875	1894	Bodmin RD
Camelford RSD	Cornwall	1875	1894	Camelford RD
Falmouth RSD	Cornwall	1875	1894	East Kerrier RD
Helston RSD	Cornwall	1875	1894	Helston RD
Isles of Scilly RSD	Cornwall	1875	1894	Isles of Scilly RD
Liskeard RSD	Cornwall	1875	1894	Liskeard RD
Penzance RSD	Cornwall	1875	1894	West Penwith RD
Redruth RSD	Cornwall	1875	1894	Redruth RD
St Austell RSD	Cornwall	1875	1894	St Austell RD
St Columb Major RSD	Cornwall	1875	1894	St Columb Major RD
St Germans RSD	Cornwall	1875	1894	St Germans RD
Stratton RSD	Cornwall	1875	1894	Stratton RD
Truro RSD	Cornwall	1875	1894	Truro RD
Holsworthy RSD	Cornwall and Devon	1875	1894	Holsworthy RD
Launceston RSD	Cornwall and Devon	1875	1894	Broadwoodwidger RD and Launceston RD
Tavistock RSD	Cornwall and Devon	1875	1894	Calstock RD and Tavistock RD
Auckland RSD	County Durham	1875	1894	Auckland RD
Chester-le-Street RSD	County Durham	1875	1894	Chester le Street RD
Durham RSD	County Durham	1875	1894	Durham RD
Easington RSD	County Durham	1875	1894	Easington RD
Gateshead RSD	County Durham	1875	1894	Whickham UD
Hartlepool RSD	County Durham	1875	1894	Hartlepool RD
Houghton-le-Spring RSD	County Durham	1875	1894	Houghton le Spring RD
Lanchester RSD	County Durham	1875	1894	Lanchester RD
Sedgefield RSD	County Durham	1875	1894	Sedgefield RD
South Shields RSD	County Durham	1875	1894	South Shields RD
Stockton RSD	County Durham	1875	1894	Stockton RD
Sunderland RSD	County Durham	1875	1894	Sunderland RD
Weardale RSD	County Durham	1875	1894	Weardale RD
Darlington RSD	County Durham and Yorkshire (1875–89), County Durham and North Riding of Yorkshire (1889–94)	1875	1894	Croft RD and Darlington RD
Teesdale RSD	County Durham and Yorkshire (1875–89), County Durham and North Riding of Yorkshire (1889–94)	1875	1894	Barnard Castle RD and Startforth RD
Alston with Garrigill RSD	Cumberland	1875	1894	Alston Moor RD
Bootle RSD	Cumberland	1875	1894	Bootle RD
Brampton RSD	Cumberland	1875	1894	Brampton RD
Carlisle RSD	Cumberland	1875	1894	Carlisle RD
Cockermouth RSD	Cumberland	1875	1894	Cockermouth RD
Longtown RSD	Cumberland	1875	1894	Longtown RD
Penrith RSD	Cumberland	1875	1894	Penrith RD
Whitehaven RSD	Cumberland	1875	1894	Whitehaven RD
Wigton RSD	Cumberland	1875	1894	Wigton RD
Ruthin RSD	Denbighshire	1875	1894	Ruthin RD
St Asaph RSD	Denbighshire and Flintshire	1875	1894	St Asaph (Denbigh) RD and St Asaph (Flint) RD
Wrexham RSD	Denbighshire and Flintshire	1875	1894	Overton RD and Wrexham RD
Corwen RSD	Denbighshire and Merionethshire	1875	1894	Edeirnion RD, Llangollen RD and Llansillin RD
Llanfyllin RSD	Denbighshire and Montgomeryshire	1875	1894	Llanfyllin RD and Llansillin RD
Oswestry RSD	Denbighshire and Shropshire	1875	1894	Chirk RD, Llansillin RD and Oswestry RD
Bakewell RSD	Derbyshire	1875	1894	Bakewell RD
Belper RSD	Derbyshire	1875	1894	Belper RD
Chapel en le Frith RSD	Derbyshire	1875	1894	Chapel en le Frith RD
Chesterfield RSD	Derbyshire	1875	1894	Chesterfield RD
Derby RSD	Derbyshire	1875	1894	Belper RD
Glossop RSD	Derbyshire	1875	1894	Glossop Dale RD
Ashby-de-la-Zouch RSD	Derbyshire and Leicestershire	1875	1894	Appleby RD, Ashby de la Zouch RD and Hartshorn and Seals RD
Basford RSD	Derbyshire and Nottinghamshire	1875	1894	Basford RD
Mansfield RSD	Derbyshire and Nottinghamshire	1875	1894	Blackwell RD and Skegby RD
Ashbourne RSD	Derbyshire and Staffordshire	1875	1894	Ashbourne RD and Mayfield RD
Burton upon Trent RSD	Derbyshire and Staffordshire	1875	1894	Repton RD and Tutbury RD
Uttoxeter RSD	Derbyshire and Staffordshire	1875	1894	Sudbury RD and Uttoxeter RD
Ecclesall Bierlow RSD	Derbyshire and Yorkshire (1875–80), Derbyshire (1880–94)	1875	1894	Norton RD
Shardlow RSD	Derbyshire, Leicestershire and Nottinghamshire	1875	1894	Castle Donington RD, Shardlow RD and Stapleford RD
Tamworth RSD	Derbyshire, Staffordshire and Warwickshire	1875	1894	Croxall RD and Tamworth RD
Axminster RSD	Devon	1875	1894	Axminster RD
Barnstaple RSD	Devon	1875	1894	Barnstaple RD
Bideford RSD	Devon	1875	1894	Bideford RD
Crediton RSD	Devon	1875	1894	Crediton RD
Honiton RSD	Devon	1875	1894	Honiton RD
Kingsbridge RSD	Devon	1875	1894	Kingsbridge RD
Newton Abbot RSD	Devon	1875	1894	Newton Abbot RD
Okehampton RSD	Devon	1875	1894	Okehampton RD
Plympton St Mary RSD	Devon	1875	1894	Plympton St Mary RD
South Molton RSD	Devon	1875	1894	South Molton RD
St Thomas RSD	Devon	1875	1894	St Thomas RD
Tiverton RSD	Devon	1875	1894	Tiverton RD
Torrington RSD	Devon	1875	1894	Torrington RD
Totnes RSD	Devon	1875	1894	Totnes RD
Dulverton RSD	Devon and Somerset	1875	1894	Dulverton RD and Tiverton RD
Taunton RSD	Devon and Somerset	1875	1894	Taunton RD
Wellington RSD	Devon and Somerset	1875	1894	Culmstock RD and Wellington RD
Chard RSD	Devon, Dorset and Somerset	1875	1894	Chard RD and Honiton RD
Blandford RSD	Dorset	1875	1894	Blandford RD
Bridport RSD	Dorset	1875	1894	Bridport RD
Cerne RSD	Dorset	1875	1894	Cerne RD
Dorchester RSD	Dorset	1875	1894	Dorchester RD
Poole RSD	Dorset	1875	1894	Poole RD
Shaftesbury RSD	Dorset	1875	1894	Shaftesbury RD
Sturminster RSD	Dorset	1875	1894	Sturminster RD
Wareham and Purbeck RSD	Dorset	1875	1894	Wareham and Purbeck RD
Weymouth RSD	Dorset	1875	1894	Weymouth RD
Wimborne and Cranborne RSD	Dorset	1875	1894	Wimborne and Cranborne RD
Beaminster RSD	Dorset and Somerset	1875	1894	Beaminster RD and Chard RD
Sherborne RSD	Dorset and Somerset	1875	1894	Poyntington RD and Sherborne RD
Wincanton RSD	Dorset and Somerset	1875	1894	Shaftesbury RD and Wincanton RD
Mere RSD	Dorset, Somerset and Wiltshire	1875	1894	Mere RD and Shaftesbury RD
Billericay RSD	Essex	1875	1894	Billericay RD
Braintree RSD	Essex	1875	1894	Braintree RD
Chelmsford RSD	Essex	1875	1894	Chelmsford RD
Dunmow RSD	Essex	1875	1894	Dunmow RD
Epping RSD	Essex	1875	1894	Epping RD
Halstead RSD	Essex	1875	1894	Halstead RD
Lexden and Winstree RSD	Essex	1875	1894	Lexden and Winstree RD
Maldon RSD	Essex	1875	1894	Maldon RD
Ongar RSD	Essex	1875	1894	Ongar RD
Orsett RSD	Essex	1875	1894	Orsett RD
Rochford RSD	Essex	1875	1894	Rochford RD
Romford RSD	Essex	1875	1894	Romford RD
Saffron Walden RSD	Essex	1875	1894	Saffron Walden RD
Tendring RSD	Essex	1875	1894	Tendring RD
Bishop's Stortford RSD	Essex and Hertfordshire	1875	1894	Bishop's Stortford RD and Stansted RD
Risbridge RSD	Essex and Suffolk (1875–89), Essex and West Suffolk (1889–94)	1875	1894	Bumpstead RD and Clare RD
Sudbury RSD	Essex and Suffolk (1875–89), Essex and West Suffolk (1889–94)	1875	1894	Belchamp RD and Melford RD
Holywell RSD	Flintshire	1875	1894	Holywell RD
Ellesmere RSD	Flintshire and Shropshire	1875	1894	Ellesmere RD and Overton RD
Whitchurch RSD	Cheshire, Flintshire and Shropshire	1875	1894	Bucklow RD, Nantwich RD, Overton RD, Tarvin RD and Whitchurch RD
Bridgend and Cowbridge RSD	Glamorganshire	1875	1894	Penybont RD
Gower RSD	Glamorganshire	1875	1894	Gower RD
Pontypridd RSD	Glamorganshire	1875	1894	Llantrisant and Llantwitfardre RD
Swansea RSD	Glamorganshire	1875	1894	Swansea RD
Cardiff RSD	Glamorganshire and Monmouthshire	1875	1894	Llandaff and Dinas Powis RD and St Mellons RD
Newport RSD	Glamorganshire and Monmouthshire	1875	1894	Magor RD and St Mellons RD
Barton Regis RSD	Gloucestershire	1875	1894	Barton Regis RD
Cheltenham RSD	Gloucestershire	1875	1894	Cheltenham RD
Chipping Sodbury RSD	Gloucestershire	1875	1894	Chipping Sodbury RD
Dursley RSD	Gloucestershire	1875	1894	Dursley RD
Gloucester RSD	Gloucestershire	1875	1894	Gloucester RD
Northleach RSD	Gloucestershire	1875	1894	Northleach RD
Stroud RSD	Gloucestershire	1875	1894	Stroud RD
Thornbury RSD	Gloucestershire	1875	1894	Thornbury RD
Westbury on Severn RSD	Gloucestershire	1875	1894	East Dean and United Parishes RD
Wheatenhurst RSD	Gloucestershire	1875	1894	Wheatenhurst RD
Ross RSD	Gloucestershire and Herefordshire	1875	1894	East Dean and United Parishes RD and Ross RD
Keynsham RSD	Gloucestershire and Somerset	1875	1894	Keynsham RD and Warmley RD
Cirencester RSD	Gloucestershire and Wiltshire	1875	1894	Cirencester RD
Tetbury RSD	Gloucestershire and Wiltshire	1875	1894	Tetbury RD
Evesham RSD	Gloucestershire and Worcestershire	1875	1894	Evesham RD and Pebworth RD
Newent RSD	Gloucestershire and Worcestershire	1875	1894	Newent RD
Stow on the Wold RSD	Gloucestershire and Worcestershire	1875	1894	Stow on the Wold RD
Tewkesbury RSD	Gloucestershire and Worcestershire	1875	1894	Tewkesbury RD
Winchcomb RSD	Gloucestershire and Worcestershire	1875	1894	Winchcomb RD
Monmouth RSD	Gloucestershire, Herefordshire and Monmouthshire	1875	1894	Monmouth RD, West Dean RD and Whitchurch RD
Shipston-on-Stour RSD	Gloucestershire, Warwickshire and Worcestershire	1875	1894	Brailes RD, Campden RD and Shipston on Stour RD
Stratford on Avon RSD	Gloucestershire, Warwickshire and Worcestershire	1875	1894	Marston Sicca RD, Shipston on Stour RD and Stratford on Avon RD
Alresford RSD	Hampshire	1875	1894	Alresford RD
Alton RSD	Hampshire	1875	1894	Alton RD
Andover RSD	Hampshire	1875	1894	Andover RD
Basingstoke RSD	Hampshire	1875	1894	Basingstoke RD
Bournemouth and Christchurch RSD	Hampshire	1875	1894	Christchurch RD
Catherington RSD	Hampshire	1875	1894	Catherington RD
Droxford RSD	Hampshire	1875	1894	Droxford RD
Fareham RSD	Hampshire	1875	1894	Fareham RD
Hartley Wintney RSD	Hampshire	1875	1894	Hartley Wintney RD
Havant RSD	Hampshire	1875	1894	Havant RD
Hursley RSD	Hampshire	1875	1894	Hursley RD
Kingsclere RSD	Hampshire	1875	1894	Kingsclere RD
Lymington RSD	Hampshire	1875	1894	Lymington RD
New Winchester RSD	Hampshire	1875	1894	New Winchester RD
Portsea Island RSD	Hampshire	1875	1894	Portsea Island RD
Ringwood RSD	Hampshire	1875	1894	Ringwood RD
South Stoneham RSD	Hampshire	1875	1894	South Stoneham RD
Stockbridge RSD	Hampshire	1875	1894	Stockbridge RD
Whitchurch RSD	Hampshire	1875	1894	Whitchurch RD
Isle of Wight RSD	Hampshire (1875–89), Isle of Wight (1889–94)	1875	1894	Isle of Wight RD
Farnham RSD	Hampshire and Surrey	1875	1894	Dockenfield RD and Farnham RD
Petersfield RSD	Hampshire and Sussex (1875–89), Hampshire and East Sussex (1889–94)	1875	1894	Petersfield RD
Fordingbridge RSD	Hampshire and Wiltshire	1875	1894	Fordingbridge RD
New Forest RSD	Hampshire and Wiltshire	1875	1894	Bramshaw RD and New Forest RD
Romsey RSD	Hampshire and Wiltshire	1875	1894	Romsey RD
Dore RSD	Herefordshire	1875	1894	Dore RD
Leominster RSD	Herefordshire	1875	1894	Leominster RD
Weobley RSD	Herefordshire	1875	1894	Weobley RD
Hereford RSD	Herefordshire and Monmouthshire	1875	1894	Abergavenny RD and Hereford RD
Kington RSD	Herefordshire and Radnorshire	1875	1894	Kington RD and New Radnor RD
Ludlow RSD	Herefordshire and Shropshire	1875	1894	Ludlow RD and Wigmore RD
Bromyard RSD	Herefordshire and Worcestershire	1875	1894	Bromyard RD and Martley RD
Ledbury RSD	Herefordshire and Worcestershire	1875	1894	Ledbury RD and Mathon RD
Knighton RSD	Herefordshire, Radnorshire and Shropshire	1875	1894	Knighton RD, Teme RD and Wigmore RD
Tenbury RSD	Herefordshire, Shropshire and Worcestershire	1875	1894	Burford RD, Leominster RD and Tenbury RD
Buntingford RSD	Hertfordshire	1875	1894	Buntingford RD
Hatfield RSD	Hertfordshire	1875	1894	Hatfield RD
Hemel Hempstead RSD	Hertfordshire	1875	1894	Hemel Hempstead RD
Hertford RSD	Hertfordshire	1875	1894	Hertford RD
St Albans RSD	Hertfordshire	1875	1894	St Albans RD
Ware RSD	Hertfordshire	1875	1894	Ware RD
Watford RSD	Hertfordshire	1875	1894	Watford RD
Welwyn RSD	Hertfordshire	1875	1894	Welwyn RD
Barnet RSD	Hertfordshire and Middlesex	1875	1894	Barnet RD and South Mimms RD
Huntingdon RSD	Huntingdonshire	1875	1894	Huntingdon RD
Oundle RSD	Huntingdonshire and Northamptonshire	1875	1894	Oundle RD
Thrapston RSD	Huntingdonshire and Northamptonshire	1875	1894	Thrapston RD
Stamford RSD	Huntingdonshire, Lincolnshire, Northamptonshire and Rutland (1875–89), Huntingdonshire, Lincolnshire, Parts of Kesteven, Northamptonshire, Rutland and Soke of Peterborough (1889–94)	1875	1894	Barnack RD, Easton on the Hill RD, Ketton RD and Uffington RD
Blean RSD	Kent	1875	1894	Blean RD
Bridge RSD	Kent	1875	1894	Bridge RD
Bromley RSD	Kent	1875	1894	Bromley RD
Cranbrook RSD	Kent	1875	1894	Cranbrook RD
Dartford RSD	Kent	1875	1894	Dartford RD
Dover RSD	Kent	1875	1894	Dover RD
East Ashford RSD	Kent	1875	1894	East Ashford RD
Eastry RSD	Kent	1875	1894	Eastry RD
Elham RSD	Kent	1875	1894	Elham RD
Faversham RSD	Kent	1875	1894	Faversham RD
Hollingbourne RSD	Kent	1875	1894	Hollingbourne RD
Hoo RSD	Kent	1875	1894	Hoo RD
Maidstone RSD	Kent	1875	1894	Maidstone RD
Malling RSD	Kent	1875	1894	Malling RD
Medway RSD	Kent	1875	1894	Medway RD
Milton RSD	Kent	1875	1894	Milton RD
North Aylesford RSD (1875–84), Strood RSD (1884–94)	Kent	1875	1894	Strood RD
Romney Marsh RSD	Kent	1875	1894	Romney Marsh RD
Sevenoaks RSD	Kent	1875	1894	Sevenoaks RD
Sheppey RSD	Kent	1875	1894	Sheppey RD
Tenterden RSD	Kent	1875	1894	Tenterden RD
Thanet RSD	Kent	1875	1894	Isle of Thanet RD
West Ashford RSD	Kent	1875	1894	West Ashford RD
Rye RSD	Kent and Sussex (1875–89), Kent and East Sussex (1889–94)	1875	1894	Rye RD
Ticehurst RSD	Kent and Sussex (1875–89), Kent and East Sussex (1889–94)	1875	1894	Ticehurst RD and Tonbridge RD
Tonbridge RSD	Kent and Sussex (1875–89), Kent and East Sussex (1889–94)	1875	1894	Tonbridge RD
Barton upon Irwell RSD	Lancashire	1875	1894	Barton upon Irwell RD
Blackburn RSD	Lancashire	1875	1894	Blackburn RD
Bolton RSD	Lancashire	1875	1894	Bolton RD
Burnley RSD	Lancashire	1875	1894	Burnley RD
Bury RSD	Lancashire	1875	1894	Bury RD
Chorley RSD	Lancashire	1875	1894	Chorley RD
Fylde RSD	Lancashire	1875	1894	Fylde RD
Garstang RSD	Lancashire	1875	1894	Garstang RD
Haslingden RSD	Lancashire	1875	1894	Burnley RD
Lancaster RSD	Lancashire	1875	1894	Lancaster RD
Leigh RSD	Lancashire	1875	1894	Leigh RD
Lunesdale RSD	Lancashire	1875	1894	Lunesdale RD
Ormskirk RSD	Lancashire	1875	1894	West Lancashire RD
Prescot RSD	Lancashire	1875	1894	Whiston RD
Preston RSD	Lancashire	1875	1894	Preston RD
Prestwich RSD	Lancashire	1875	1894	Prestwich UD
Ulverston RSD	Lancashire	1875	1894	Ulverston RD
West Derby RSD	Lancashire	1875	1894	Sefton RD
Wigan RSD	Lancashire	1875	1894	Wigan RD
Kendal RSD	Lancashire and Westmorland	1875	1894	Dalton RD and South Westmorland RD
Clitheroe RSD	Lancashire and Yorkshire (1875–89), Lancashire and West Riding of Yorkshire (1889–94)	1875	1894	Bowland RD and Clitheroe RD
Barrow upon Soar RSD	Leicestershire	1875	1894	Barrow upon Soar RD
Billesdon RSD	Leicestershire	1875	1894	Billesdon RD
Blaby RSD	Leicestershire	1875	1894	Blaby RD
Market Bosworth RSD	Leicestershire	1875	1894	Market Bosworth RD
Grantham RSD	Leicestershire and Lincolnshire (1875–89), Leicestershire and Lincolnshire, Parts of Kesteven (1889–94)	1875	1894	Belvoir RD and Grantham RD
Market Harborough RSD	Leicestershire and Northamptonshire	1875	1894	Market Harborough RD and Oxendon RD
Bingham RSD	Leicestershire and Nottinghamshire	1875	1894	Belvoir RD and Bingham RD
Loughborough RSD	Leicestershire and Nottinghamshire	1875	1894	Loughborough RD and Leake RD
Melton Mowbray RSD	Leicestershire and Nottinghamshire	1875	1894	Bingham RD and Melton Mowbray RD
Oakham RSD	Leicestershire and Rutland	1875	1894	Melton Mowbray RD and Oakham RD
Atherstone RSD	Leicestershire and Warwickshire	1875	1894	Atherstone RD and Market Bosworth RD
Hinckley RSD	Leicestershire and Warwickshire	1875	1894	Hinckley RD and Nuneaton RD
Uppingham RSD	Leicestershire, Northamptonshire and Rutland	1875	1894	Gretton RD, Hallaton RD and Uppingham RD
Lutterworth RSD	Leicestershire, Northamptonshire and Warwickshire	1875	1894	Lutterworth RD, Monks Kirby RD and Oxendon RD
Spalding RSD	Lincolnshire (1875–89), Lincolnshire, Parts of Holland and Parts of Kesteven (1889–94)	1875	1894	Spalding RD
Boston RSD	Lincolnshire (1875–89), Lincolnshire, Parts of Holland and Parts of Lindsey (1889–94)	1875	1894	Boston RD and Sibsey RD
Bourne RSD	Lincolnshire (1875–89), Lincolnshire, Parts of Kesteven (1889–94)	1875	1894	Bourne RD
Sleaford RSD	Lincolnshire (1875–89), Lincolnshire, Parts of Kesteven (1889–94)	1875	1894	Sleaford RD
Lincoln RSD	Lincolnshire (1875–89), Lincolnshire, Parts of Kesteven and Parts of Lindsey (1889–94)	1875	1894	Branston RD and Welton RD
Caistor RSD	Lincolnshire (1875–89), Lincolnshire, Parts of Lindsey (1889–94)	1875	1894	Caistor RD
Glanford Brigg RSD	Lincolnshire (1875–89), Lincolnshire, Parts of Lindsey (1889–94)	1875	1894	Glanford Brigg RD
Grimsby RSD	Lincolnshire (1875–89), Lincolnshire, Parts of Lindsey (1889–94)	1875	1894	Grimsby RD
Horncastle RSD	Lincolnshire (1875–89), Lincolnshire, Parts of Lindsey (1889–94)	1875	1894	Horncastle RD
Louth RSD	Lincolnshire (1875–89), Lincolnshire, Parts of Lindsey (1889–94)	1875	1894	Louth RD
Spilsby RSD	Lincolnshire (1875–89), Lincolnshire, Parts of Lindsey (1889–94)	1875	1894	Spilsby RD
Holbeach RSD	Lincolnshire and Norfolk (1875–89), Lincolnshire, Parts of Holland and Norfolk (1889–94)	1875	1894	Central Wingland RD and East Elloe RD
Newark RSD	Lincolnshire and Nottinghamshire (1875–89), Lincolnshire, Parts of Kesteven and Nottinghamshire (1889–94)	1875	1894	Claypole RD and Newark RD
Gainsborough RSD	Lincolnshire and Nottinghamshire (1875–89), Lincolnshire, Parts of Lindsey and Nottinghamshire (1889–94)	1875	1894	Gainsborough RD and Misterton RD
Goole RSD	Lincolnshire and Yorkshire (1875–89), Lincolnshire, Parts of Lindsey and West Riding of Yorkshire (1889–94)	1875	1894	Goole RD and Isle of Axholme RD
Thorne RSD	Lincolnshire and Yorkshire (1875–89), Lincolnshire, Parts of Lindsey and West Riding of Yorkshire (1889–94)	1875	1894	Isle of Axholme RD and Thorne RD
Bala RSD	Merionethshire	1875	1894	Penllyn RD
Dolgelly RSD	Merionethshire and Montgomeryshire	1875	1894	Dolgelly RD
Brentford RSD	Middlesex	1875	1894	Brentford UD and Greenford UD
Edgware RSD (1875–77), Hendon RSD (1877–94)	Middlesex	1875	1894	Hendon RD
Staines RSD	Middlesex	1875	1894	Staines RD
Uxbridge RSD	Middlesex	1875	1894	Uxbridge RD
Kingston upon Thames RSD	Middlesex and Surrey (1875–90), Surrey (1890–94)	1875	1894	Kingston upon Thames RD
Abergavenny RSD	Monmouthshire	1875	1894	Abergavenny RD
Bedwelty RSD	Monmouthshire	1875	1894	Bedwellty UD
Chepstow RSD	Monmouthshire	1875	1894	Chepstow RD
Pontypool RSD	Monmouthshire	1875	1894	Pontypool RD
Newtown RSD	Montgomeryshire	1875	1894	Newtown and Llanidloes RD
Atcham RSD	Montgomeryshire and Shropshire	1875	1894	Atcham RD and Forden RD
Clun RSD	Montgomeryshire and Shropshire	1875	1894	Clun RD and Forden RD
Forden RSD	Montgomeryshire and Shropshire	1875	1894	Chirbury RD and Forden RD
Aylsham RSD	Norfolk	1875	1894	Aylsham RD
Blofield RSD	Norfolk	1875	1894	Blofield RD
Depwade RSD	Norfolk	1875	1894	Depwade RD
Docking RSD	Norfolk	1875	1894	Docking RD
East and West Flegg RSD	Norfolk	1875	1894	East and West Flegg RD
Erpingham RSD	Norfolk	1875	1894	Erpingham RD
Forehoe RSD	Norfolk	1875	1894	Forehoe RD
Freebridge Lynn RSD	Norfolk	1875	1894	Freebridge Lynn RD
Guiltcross RSD	Norfolk	1875	1894	Guiltcross RD
Henstead RSD	Norfolk	1875	1894	Henstead RD
King's Lynn RSD	Norfolk	1875	1894	King's Lynn RD
Loddon and Clavering RSD	Norfolk	1875	1894	Loddon and Clavering RD
Mitford and Launditch RSD	Norfolk	1875	1894	Mitford and Launditch RD
Smallburgh RSD	Norfolk	1875	1894	Smallburgh RD
St Faith's RSD	Norfolk	1875	1894	St Faith's RD
Swaffham RSD	Norfolk	1875	1894	Swaffham RD
Walsingham RSD	Norfolk	1875	1894	Walsingham RD
Wayland RSD	Norfolk	1875	1894	Wayland RD
Thetford RSD	Norfolk and Suffolk (1875–89), Norfolk and West Suffolk (1889–94)	1875	1894	Brandon RD and Thetford RD
Brixworth RSD	Northamptonshire	1875	1894	Brixworth RD
Daventry RSD	Northamptonshire	1875	1894	Daventry RD
Hardingstone RSD	Northamptonshire	1875	1894	Hardingstone RD
Kettering RSD	Northamptonshire	1875	1894	Kettering RD
Northampton RSD	Northamptonshire	1875	1894	Northampton RD
Towcester RSD	Northamptonshire	1875	1894	Towcester RD
Rugby RSD	Northamptonshire and Warwickshire	1875	1894	Crick RD and Rugby RD
Southam RSD	Northamptonshire and Warwickshire	1875	1894	Southam RD
Banbury RSD	Northamptonshire, Oxfordshire and Warwickshire	1875	1894	Banbury RD, Farnborough RD and Middleton Cheney RD
Alnwick RSD	Northumberland	1875	1894	Alnwick RD
Belford RSD	Northumberland	1875	1894	Belford RD
Bellingham RSD	Northumberland	1875	1894	Bellingham RD
Berwick RSD	Northumberland	1875	1894	Norham and Islandshires RD
Castle Ward RSD	Northumberland	1875	1894	Castle Ward RD
Glendale RSD	Northumberland	1875	1894	Glendale RD
Haltwhistle RSD	Northumberland	1875	1894	Haltwhistle RD
Hexham RSD	Northumberland	1875	1894	Hexham RD
Morpeth RSD	Northumberland	1875	1894	Morpeth RD
Rothbury RSD	Northumberland	1875	1894	Rothbury RD
Tynemouth RSD	Northumberland	1875	1894	Tynemouth RD
East Retford RSD	Nottinghamshire	1875	1894	East Retford RD
Southwell RSD	Nottinghamshire	1875	1894	Southwell RD
Doncaster RSD	Nottinghamshire and Yorkshire (1875–89), Nottinghamshire and West Riding of Yorkshire (1889–94)	1875	1894	Doncaster RD and East Retford RD
Worksop RSD	Nottinghamshire, Derbyshire and Yorkshire (1875–89), Nottinghamshire, Derbyshire and West Riding of Yorkshire (1889–94)	1875	1894	Blyth and Cuckney RD, Clowne RD and Kiveton Park RD
Headington RSD	Oxfordshire	1875	1894	Headington RD
Witney RSD	Oxfordshire	1875	1894	Witney RD
Woodstock RSD	Oxfordshire	1875	1894	Woodstock RD
Chipping Norton RSD	Oxfordshire and Warwickshire	1875	1894	Brailes RD and Chipping Norton RD
Haverfordwest RSD	Pembrokeshire	1875	1894	Haverfordwest RD
Pembroke RSD	Pembrokeshire	1875	1894	Pembroke RD
Bridgnorth RSD	Shropshire	1875	1894	Bridgnorth RD
Church Stretton RSD	Shropshire	1875	1894	Church Stretton RD
Madeley RSD	Shropshire	1875	1894	Madeley RD
Wellington RSD	Shropshire	1875	1894	Wellington RD
Wem RSD	Shropshire	1875	1894	Wem RD
Newport RSD	Shropshire and Staffordshire	1875	1894	Gnosall RD and Newport RD
Seisdon RSD	Shropshire and Staffordshire	1875	1894	Seisdon RD
Shifnal RSD	Shropshire and Staffordshire	1875	1894	Shifnal RD
Cleobury Mortimer RSD	Shropshire and Worcestershire	1875	1894	Cleobury Mortimer RD and Rock RD
Kidderminster RSD	Shropshire, Staffordshire and Worcestershire	1875	1894	Kidderminster RD
Axbridge RSD	Somerset	1875	1894	Axbridge RD
Bath RSD	Somerset	1875	1894	Bath RD
Bedminster RSD	Somerset	1875	1894	Long Ashton RD
Bridgwater RSD	Somerset	1875	1894	Bridgwater RD
Clutton RSD	Somerset	1875	1894	Clutton RD
Frome RSD	Somerset	1875	1894	Frome RD
Langport RSD	Somerset	1875	1894	Langport RD
Shepton Mallet RSD	Somerset	1875	1894	Shepton Mallet RD
Wells RSD	Somerset	1875	1894	Wells RD
Williton RSD	Somerset	1875	1894	Williton RD
Yeovil RSD	Somerset	1875	1894	Yeovil RD
Cannock RSD	Staffordshire	1875	1894	Cannock RD
Cheadle RSD	Staffordshire	1875	1894	Cheadle RD
Dudley RSD	Staffordshire	1875	1894	Dudley RD
Leek RSD	Staffordshire	1875	1894	Leek RD
Lichfield RSD	Staffordshire	1875	1894	Lichfield RD
Newcastle-under-Lyme RSD	Staffordshire	1875	1894	Newcastle-under-Lyme RD
Stafford RSD	Staffordshire	1875	1894	Stafford RD
Stoke upon Trent RSD	Staffordshire	1875	1894	Stoke upon Trent RD
Stone RSD	Staffordshire	1875	1894	Stone RD
Walsall RSD	Staffordshire	1875	1894	Walsall RD
Wolstanton and Burslem RSD	Staffordshire	1875	1894	Wolstanton RD
King's Norton RSD	Staffordshire and Worcestershire	1875	1894	King's Norton RD and Smethwick UD
Stourbridge RSD	Staffordshire and Worcestershire	1875	1894	Halesowen RD, Kingswinford RD and Stourbridge RD
West Bromwich RSD	Staffordshire and Worcestershire	1875	1894	Perry Barr UD and Warley RD
Blything RSD	Suffolk (1875–89), East Suffolk (1889–94)	1875	1894	Blything RD
Bosmere and Claydon RSD	Suffolk (1875–89), East Suffolk (1889–94)	1875	1894	Bosmere and Claydon RD
Hartismere RSD	Suffolk (1875–89), East Suffolk (1889–94)	1875	1894	Hartismere RD
Hoxne RSD	Suffolk (1875–89), East Suffolk (1889–94)	1875	1894	Hoxne RD
Ipswich RSD	Suffolk (1875–89), East Suffolk (1889–94)	1875	1894	Woodbridge RD
Mutford and Lothingland RSD	Suffolk (1875–89), East Suffolk (1889–94)	1875	1894	Mutford and Lothingland RD
Plomesgate RSD	Suffolk (1875–89), East Suffolk (1889–94)	1875	1894	Plomesgate RD
Samford RSD	Suffolk (1875–89), East Suffolk (1889–94)	1875	1894	Samford RD
Wangford RSD	Suffolk (1875–89), East Suffolk (1889–94)	1875	1894	Wangford RD
Woodbridge RSD	Suffolk (1875–89), East Suffolk (1889–94)	1875	1894	Woodbridge RD
Stow RSD	Suffolk (1875–89), East Suffolk and West Suffolk (1889–94)	1875	1894	East Stow RD and Thedwastre RD
Cosford RSD	Suffolk (1875–89), West Suffolk (1889–94)	1875	1894	Cosford RD
Mildenhall RSD	Suffolk (1875–89), West Suffolk (1889–94)	1875	1894	Cosford RD and Mildenhall RD
Thingoe RSD	Suffolk (1875–89), West Suffolk (1889–94)	1875	1894	Thingoe RD
Chertsey RSD	Surrey	1875	1894	Chertsey RD
Croydon RSD	Surrey	1875	1894	Croydon RD
Dorking RSD	Surrey	1875	1894	Dorking RD
Epsom RSD	Surrey	1875	1894	Epsom RD
Godstone RSD	Surrey	1875	1894	Godstone RD
Guildford RSD	Surrey	1875	1894	Guildford RD
Hambledon RSD	Surrey	1875	1894	Hambledon RD
Reigate RSD	Surrey	1875	1894	Reigate RD
East Grinstead RSD	Surrey and Sussex (1875–89), Surrey and East Sussex (1889–94)	1875	1894	East Grinstead RD
Battle RSD	Sussex (1875–89), East Sussex (1889–94)	1875	1894	Battle RD
Chailey RSD	Sussex (1875–89), East Sussex (1889–94)	1875	1894	Chailey RD
Cuckfield RSD	Sussex (1875–89), East Sussex (1889–94)	1875	1894	Cuckfield RD
Eastbourne RSD	Sussex (1875–89), East Sussex (1889–94)	1875	1894	Eastbourne RD
Hailsham RSD	Sussex (1875–89), East Sussex (1889–94)	1875	1894	Hailsham RD
Hastings RSD	Sussex (1875–89), East Sussex (1889–94)	1875	1894	Hastings RD
Lewes RSD	Sussex (1875–89), East Sussex (1889–94)	1875	1894	Chailey RD
Newhaven RSD	Sussex (1875–89), East Sussex (1889–94)	1875	1894	Newhaven RD
Uckfield RSD	Sussex (1875–89), East Sussex (1889–94)	1875	1894	Uckfield RD
West Firle RSD	Sussex (1875–89), East Sussex (1889–94)	1875	1894	Chailey RD, Eastbourne RD and Hailsham RD
Steyning RSD	Sussex (1875–89), East Sussex and West Sussex (1889–94)	1875	1894	Steyning East RD and Steyning West RD
Chichester RSD	Sussex (1875–89), West Sussex (1889–94)	1875	1894	Westhampnett RD
East Preston RSD	Sussex (1875–89), West Sussex (1889–94)	1875	1894	East Preston RD
Horsham RSD	Sussex (1875–89), West Sussex (1889–94)	1875	1894	Horsham RD
Midhurst RSD	Sussex (1875–89), West Sussex (1889–94)	1875	1894	Midhurst RD
Petworth RSD	Sussex (1875–89), West Sussex (1889–94)	1875	1894	Petworth RD
Thakenham RSD	Sussex (1875–89), West Sussex (1889–94)	1875	1894	Thakenham RD
Westbourne RSD	Sussex (1875–89), West Sussex (1889–94)	1875	1894	Westbourne RD
Westhampnett RSD	Sussex (1875–89), West Sussex (1889–94)	1875	1894	Westhampnett RD
Aston RSD	Warwickshire	1875	1894	Castle Bromwich RD
Coventry RSD	Warwickshire	1875	1894	Coventry RD
Foleshill RSD	Warwickshire	1875	1894	Foleshill RD
Meriden RSD	Warwickshire	1875	1894	Meriden RD
Nuneaton RSD	Warwickshire	1875	1894	Nuneaton RD
Warwick RSD	Warwickshire	1875	1894	Warwick RD
Alcester RSD	Warwickshire and Worcestershire	1875	1894	Alcester RD and Feckenham RD
Solihull RSD	Warwickshire and Worcestershire	1875	1894	Solihull RD and Yardley RD
East Ward RSD	Westmorland	1875	1894	East Westmorland RD
West Ward RSD	Westmorland	1875	1894	West Ward RD
Alderbury RSD	Wiltshire	1875	1894	Salisbury RD
Amesbury RSD	Wiltshire	1875	1894	Amesbury RD
Bradford RSD	Wiltshire	1875	1894	Bradford-on-Avon RD
Calne RSD	Wiltshire	1875	1894	Calne RD
Chippenham RSD	Wiltshire	1875	1894	Chippenham RD
Cricklade and Wootton Bassett RSD	Wiltshire	1875	1894	Cricklade and Wootton Bassett RD
Devizes RSD	Wiltshire	1875	1894	Devizes RD
Highworth and Swindon RSD	Wiltshire	1875	1894	Highworth RD
Malmesbury RSD	Wiltshire	1875	1894	Malmesbury RD
Marlborough RSD	Wiltshire	1875	1894	Marlborough RD
Melksham RSD	Wiltshire	1875	1894	Melksham RD
Pewsey RSD	Wiltshire	1875	1894	Pewsey RD
Tisbury RSD	Wiltshire	1875	1894	Tisbury RD
Warminster RSD	Wiltshire	1875	1894	Warminster RD
Westbury and Whorwellsdown RSD	Wiltshire	1875	1894	Westbury and Whorwellsdown RD
Wilton RSD	Wiltshire	1875	1894	Wilton RD
Bromsgrove RSD	Worcestershire	1875	1894	Bromsgrove RD
Droitwich RSD	Worcestershire	1875	1894	Droitwich RD
Martley RSD	Worcestershire	1875	1894	Martley RD
Pershore RSD	Worcestershire	1875	1894	Pershore RD
Upton on Severn RSD	Worcestershire	1875	1894	Upton upon Severn RD
Worcester RSD	Worcestershire	1875	1894	Droitwich RD, Martley RD and Pershore RD
Beverley RSD	Yorkshire (1875–89), East Riding of Yorkshire (1889–94)	1875	1894	Beverley RD
Bridlington RSD	Yorkshire (1875–89), East Riding of Yorkshire (1889–94)	1875	1894	Bridlington RD
Driffield RSD	Yorkshire (1875–89), East Riding of Yorkshire (1889–94)	1875	1894	Driffield RD
Howden RSD	Yorkshire (1875–89), East Riding of Yorkshire (1889–94)	1875	1894	Howden RD
Patrington RSD	Yorkshire (1875–89), East Riding of Yorkshire (1889–94)	1875	1894	Patrington RD
Pocklington RSD	Yorkshire (1875–89), East Riding of Yorkshire (1889–94)	1875	1894	Pocklington RD
Sculcoates RSD	Yorkshire (1875–89), East Riding of Yorkshire (1889–94)	1875	1894	Sculcoates RD
Skirlaugh RSD	Yorkshire (1875–89), East Riding of Yorkshire (1889–94)	1875	1894	Skirlaugh RD
Malton RSD	Yorkshire (1875–89), East Riding of Yorkshire and North Riding of Yorkshire (1889–94)	1875	1894	Malton RD and Norton RD
Scarborough RSD	Yorkshire (1875–89), East Riding of Yorkshire and North Riding of Yorkshire (1889–94)	1875	1894	Scarborough RD and Sherburn RD
Selby RSD	Yorkshire (1875–89), East Riding of Yorkshire and West Riding of Yorkshire (1889–94)	1875	1894	Riccal RD and Selby RD
York RSD	Yorkshire (1875–89), East Riding of Yorkshire, North Riding of Yorkshire and West Riding of Yorkshire (1889–94)	1875	1894	Bishopthorpe RD, Escrick RD and Flaxton RD
Aysgarth RSD	Yorkshire (1875–89), North Riding of Yorkshire (1889–94)	1875	1894	Aysgarth RD
Bedale RSD	Yorkshire (1875–89), North Riding of Yorkshire (1889–94)	1875	1894	Bedale RD
Easingwold RSD	Yorkshire (1875–89), North Riding of Yorkshire (1889–94)	1875	1894	Easingwold RD
Guisborough RSD	Yorkshire (1875–89), North Riding of Yorkshire (1889–94)	1875	1894	Guisborough RD
Helmsley RSD	Yorkshire (1875–89), North Riding of Yorkshire (1889–94)	1875	1894	Helmsley RD
Kirby Moorside RSD	Yorkshire (1875–89), North Riding of Yorkshire (1889–94)	1875	1894	Kirby Moorside RD
Leyburn RSD	Yorkshire (1875–89), North Riding of Yorkshire (1889–94)	1875	1894	Leyburn RD
Middlesbrough RSD	Yorkshire (1875–89), North Riding of Yorkshire (1889–94)	1875	1894	Middlesbrough RD
Northallerton RSD	Yorkshire (1875–89), North Riding of Yorkshire (1889–94)	1875	1894	Northallerton RD
Pickering RSD	Yorkshire (1875–89), North Riding of Yorkshire (1889–94)	1875	1894	Pickering RD
Reeth RSD	Yorkshire (1875–89), North Riding of Yorkshire (1889–94)	1875	1894	Reeth RD
Richmond RSD	Yorkshire (1875–89), North Riding of Yorkshire (1889–94)	1875	1894	Richmond RD
Stokesley RSD	Yorkshire (1875–89), North Riding of Yorkshire (1889–94)	1875	1894	Stokesley RD
Thirsk RSD	Yorkshire (1875–89), North Riding of Yorkshire (1889–94)	1875	1894	Thirsk RD
Whitby RSD	Yorkshire (1875–89), North Riding of Yorkshire (1889–94)	1875	1894	Whitby RD
Great Ouseburn RSD	Yorkshire (1875–89), North Riding of Yorkshire and West Riding of Yorkshire (1889–94)	1875	1894	Easingwold RD, Great Ouseburn RD and Lower Dunsforth RD
Ripon RSD	Yorkshire (1875–89), North Riding of Yorkshire and West Riding of Yorkshire (1889–94)	1875	1894	Ripon RD and Wath RD
Barnsley RSD	Yorkshire (1875–89), West Riding of Yorkshire (1889–94)	1875	1894	Barnsley RD
Halifax RSD	Yorkshire (1875–89), West Riding of Yorkshire (1889–94)	1875	1894	Halifax RD
Hemsworth RSD	Yorkshire (1875–89), West Riding of Yorkshire (1889–94)	1875	1894	Hemsworth RD
Hunslet RSD	Yorkshire (1875–89), West Riding of Yorkshire (1889–94)	1875	1894	Hunslet RD
Keighley RSD	Yorkshire (1875–89), West Riding of Yorkshire (1889–94)	1875	1894	Keighley RD
Knaresborough RSD	Yorkshire (1875–89), West Riding of Yorkshire (1889–94)	1875	1894	Knaresborough RD
Leeds RSD	Yorkshire (1875–89), West Riding of Yorkshire (1889–94)	1875	1894	Leeds RD
Pateley Bridge RSD	Yorkshire (1875–89), West Riding of Yorkshire (1889–94)	1875	1894	Pateley Bridge RD
Penistone RSD	Yorkshire (1875–89), West Riding of Yorkshire (1889–94)	1875	1894	Penistone RD
Pontefract RSD	Yorkshire (1875–89), West Riding of Yorkshire (1889–94)	1875	1894	Pontefract RD
Rotherham RSD	Yorkshire (1875–89), West Riding of Yorkshire (1889–94)	1875	1894	Rotherham RD
Saddleworth RSD	Yorkshire (1875–89), West Riding of Yorkshire (1889–94)	1875	1894	Saddleworth RD
Sedbergh RSD	Yorkshire (1875–89), West Riding of Yorkshire (1889–94)	1875	1894	Sedbergh RD
Settle RSD	Yorkshire (1875–89), West Riding of Yorkshire (1889–94)	1875	1894	Settle RD
Skipton RSD	Yorkshire (1875–89), West Riding of Yorkshire (1889–94)	1875	1894	Skipton RD
Tadcaster RSD	Yorkshire (1875–89), West Riding of Yorkshire (1889–94)	1875	1894	Tadcaster RD
Todmorden RSD	Yorkshire (1875–89), West Riding of Yorkshire (1889–94)	1875	1894	Todmorden RD
Wakefield RSD	Yorkshire (1875–89), West Riding of Yorkshire (1889–94)	1875	1894	Wakefield RD
Wetherby RSD	Yorkshire (1875–89), West Riding of Yorkshire (1889–94)	1875	1894	Wetherby RD
Wharfedale RSD	Yorkshire (1875–89), West Riding of Yorkshire (1889–94)	1875	1894	Wharfedale RD
Wortley RSD	Yorkshire (1875–89), West Riding of Yorkshire (1889–94)	1875	1894	Wortley RD

== Previous rural sanitary districts ==
RSDs abolished prior to 1894 were:

Rural Sanitary District	County	Created	Abolished	Successor(s)
West Ham RSD	Essex	1875	1886	East Ham LGD
Witham RSD	Essex	1875	1883	absorbed by Braintree RSD and Maldon RSD
Chorlton RSD	Lancashire	1875	by 1888	???? LGD
Radford RSD	Nottinghamshire	1875	1880	absorbed by Nottingham MB
Richmond RSD	Surrey	1875	1893	Barnes LGD

== See also ==
- Rural districts formed in England and Wales 1894–1974
- Local boards formed in England and Wales 1848–94
- List of rural and urban districts in England in 1973
- List of rural and urban districts in Wales in 1973
