= Market Harborough Rural District =

Former local government area in the UK

Coordinates: 52.51°N 0.91°W

The rural district of Market Harborough existed in Leicestershire, England, from 1894 to 1974. It covered the area around Market Harborough, but not including the actual town. It was greatly extended in 1935 by the abolition of Hallaton Rural District. In 1974 under the Local Government Act 1972, it merged with Market Harborough urban district, Billesdon Rural District, Lutterworth Rural District to form the Harborough non-metropolitan district.

The area included the civil parishes of Blaston, Bringhurst, Cranoe, Drayton, East Langton, Fleckney, Foxton, Glooston, Great Bowden, Great Easton, Gumley, Hallaton, Horninghold, Husbands Bosworth, Kibworth Beauchamp, Kibworth Harcourt, Laughton, Lubenham, Market Harborough (unparished in 1974), Medbourne, Mowsley, Nevill Holt, Saddington, Shangton, Slawston, Smeeton Westerby, Stockerston, Stonton Wyville, Theddingworth, Thorpe Langton, Tur Langton, Welham and West Langton.
