= Lutterworth Rural District =

Former local government area in the UK

Coordinates: 52.47°N 1.21°W

The rural district of Lutterworth in Leicestershire, England existed from 1894 to 1974. It contained the following civil parishes:

- Arnesby
- Ashby Magna
- Ashby Parva
- Bittesby
- Bitteswell
- Broughton Astley
- Bruntingthorpe
- Catthorpe
- Claybrooke Magna
- Claybrooke Parva
- Cotesbach
- Dunton Bassett
- Frolesworth
- Gilmorton
- Kimcote and Walton
- Knaptoft
- Leire
- Lutterworth
- Misterton
- North Kilworth
- Peatling Magna
- Peatling Parva
- Shawell
- Shearsby
- South Kilworth
- Swinford
- Ullesthorpe
- Walton in Knaptoft
- Westrill and Starmore
- Wigston Parva
- Willoughby Waterleys

In 1974 it was merged under the Local Government Act 1972 to form part of the new Harborough non-metropolitan district, along with Market Harborough Rural District and Market Harborough.
