= Hallaton Rural District =

Former local government area in the UK

Coordinates: 52.56°N 0.83°W

The rural district of Hallaton existed in Leicestershire, England from 1894 to 1935. It included the following civil parishes, which were the parts of the Uppingham Rural Sanitary District in Leicestershire.

- Blaston
- Bringhurst
- Drayton
- Great Easton
- Hallaton
- Horninghold
- Medbourne
- Nevill Holt
- Stockerston

In 1935 it was merged into the Market Harborough Rural District, under the review caused by the Local Government Act 1929. It now (after 1974) forms part of the non-metropolitan district of Harborough.
