= Stonton Wyville =

Village in Leicestershire, England

Coordinates: 52.548782°N 0.916027°W

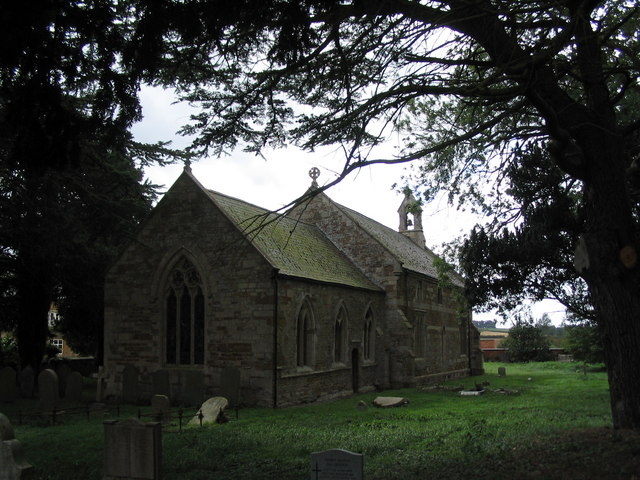
- St Denys Church

- Location within Leicestershire
- Population: 21
- Civil parish: Stonton Wyville
- District: Harborough
- Shire county: Leicestershire
- Region: East Midlands
- Country: England
- Sovereign state: United Kingdom
- Post town: MARKET HARBOROUGH
- Postcode district: LE16
- Police: Leicestershire
- Fire: Leicestershire
- Ambulance: East Midlands
- UK Parliament: Harborough

Stonton Wyville is a small village and civil parish in the Harborough district of Leicestershire, England. According to the 2001 census the parish had a population of 21. The population at the 2011 census remained fewer than 100 and was included in the civil parish of Glooston. The village is about eleven miles (18 km) south east of Leicester. Nearby places include Kibworth Harcourt, Tur Langton, Church Langton, and Shangton.

The buildings include a church, a manor house, a rectory and a farm that used to be the Fox and Hounds Inn.

Stonton Wyville parish is 1,217 acres (4.93 km^{2}) or 1.9 square miles (4.9 km^{2}) in area. Bounded on the western side by a tributary of the River Welland the parish rises from a height of 250 feet (76 m) near the river to about 450 feet (140 m) in the north and 500 feet (150 m) in the south. The soil is loamy clay over clay subsoil. The majority of farmland in Stonton is used for pasture and has been since 17th century enclosures. Stonton Wood, in the north of the parish, covered about 100 acres (0.40 km^{2}) in 1279.

== History ==
In 1086, the Domesday Book shows that Stonton Wyville was part of the estates of Hugh de Grandmesnil. Stonton was among a hundred manors that had been given to Hugh for his assistance in the Norman Conquest of England.

"The same man holds of Hugh 6 carucates of land in Stonton Wyville. There is land for 4 ploughs. In demesne are 2 ploughs and 2 slaves and 15 villans with a priest and 2 bordars have 4 ploughs. There are two mills rendering 5s4d and 8 acres (32,000 m^{2}) of meadow, woodland 6 furlongs long and 4 furlongs broad. It was worth 40s now 60s".

Hugh did not have rights over all the land in the village, some was controlled by the King's niece. She had interests which included "10 acres of meadow".

There were two mills in Domesday and there were still two in 1605. One of the mills was still working in 1846 but not by 1863. Which is regrettable as they could have used it to power a threshing machine ...

In 1494, the last William Wyville died. Stonton Wyville is named after him and his ancestors who had been instrumental in the village since the Domesday Book where they had been under tenants.

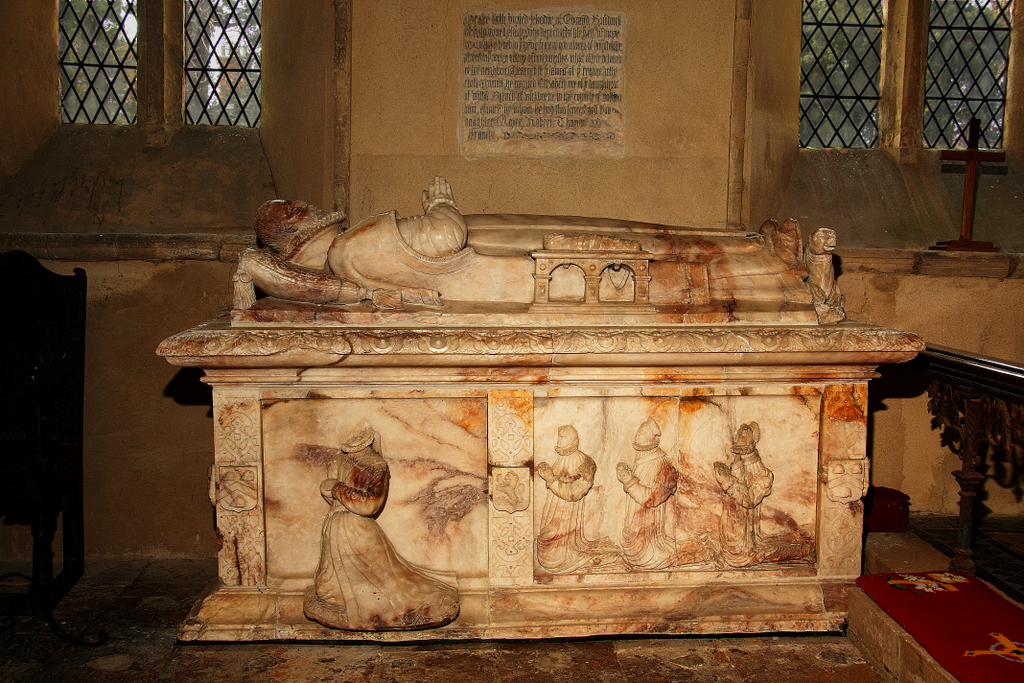
Edmund Brudenelle died 1590

On 25 February 1628 Sir Thomas Brudenell (whose family had married into the Wyvilles) was created Baron Brudenell of Stonton. There was a move to rename the village Stonton Brudenell, but this never stuck. (Thomas went on to be first Earl of Cardigan). Edmund Brudenell has an impressive alabaster monument in the church. Alongside the father, a swaddled baby lies on its own tomb.

In January 1862 there was an inquest held at the Fox and Hounds Inn into the deaths of several villagers who had died in a dreadful boiler explosion. Killed in the explosion "on the spot, Thomas Lee, about 40 years of age, was blown over 40 yards (37 m) into a ditch. William Woolman, about 65 years of age was blown fully fifty yards..." and Samuel Ashby. George Woolman died of his injuries on the same day. It appears from the inquest that 13 people had been gathered around a steam engine that was being used to power a small threshing machine that they had hired from a Mr Butcher of Debdale Wharf.

Stonton Wyville must have been much larger in the past. It is officially recognised as a "shrunken or deserted medieval village".
