= South East Derbyshire Rural District =

Former local government area in the UK

Coordinates: 52.89°N 1.38°W

South East Derbyshire was a rural district in Derbyshire, England from 1894 to 1974. It covered an area to the south-east of Derby.

It was formed as Shardlow rural district under the Local Government Act 1894, mainly from the Derbyshire part of the Shardlow rural sanitary district (the Leicestershire part becoming Castle Donington Rural District, and most of the Nottinghamshire part becoming Stapleford Rural District).

It also administered the parishes of Ratcliffe on Soar and Kingston on Soar in Nottinghamshire – these became part of Leake Rural District in 1927.

The district was renamed South East Derbyshire in 1959. It was abolished under the Local Government Act 1972, with the parishes of Breadsall, Breaston, Dale Abbey, Draycott and Church Wilne, Hopwell, Little Eaton, Morley, Ockbrook, Risley, Sandiacre, Stanley, Stanton by Dale and West Hallam going on to form part of the new Erewash district, with the rest becoming part of a new South Derbyshire district.
