= Leake Rural District =

Rural district in Nottinghamshire, England (1894 - 1935)

Coordinates: 52.82°N 1.18°W

- History
  - Created: 1894
  - Abolished: 1935
  - Succeeded by: Basford Rural District
- Status: Rural district

Leake was a rural district in Nottinghamshire, England from 1894 to 1935.

It was formed from the Nottinghamshire part of the Loughborough rural sanitary district by the Local Government Act 1894 (the rest going to form the Loughborough Rural District in Leicestershire.)

It picked up the parishes of Kingston on Soar and Ratcliffe on Soar in 1927, which had previously been administered by Shardlow Rural District, based mainly in Derbyshire, having been part of the Shardlow rural sanitary district prior to 1894.

In 1935 the district was abolished under a County Review Order, becoming part of the Basford Rural District.
