= Hinckley Rural District =

Former local government area in the UK

Coordinates: 52.55°N 1.34°W

The rural district of Hinckley was set up in 1894, covering the rural area around Hinckley, Leicestershire, England. It was named for Hinckley, but did not include it. It was created by the Local Government Act 1894 based on the Hinckley Rural Sanitary District.

The district was abolished in 1935, under the review caused by the Local Government Act 1929, with part going to Hinckley Urban District, most of the rest going to Blaby Rural District and Market Bosworth Rural District. Very small parts went to Nuneaton and Atherstone Rural District.
