= Billesdon Rural District =

Former local government area in the UK

Coordinates: 52.62°N 0.95°W

Billesdon was a rural district of Leicestershire, England. It originated with the Billesdon Poor Law Union, formed in 1835. In 1894 the area became a rural district. It was named for the village of Billesdon.

In 1935 the rural district was decreased by the annexing of Humberstone, most of Evington, and some of Thurnby civil parishes to Leicester (with some small parts going to Oadby in 1936). It was further reduced in 1966 by the annexation of part of Scraptoft, Stoughton and Thurnby parishes. In 1974 it became part of the Harborough non-metropolitan district, along with the Lutterworth Rural District, Market Harborough Rural District, and Market Harborough urban districts.
