= Sharnford =

Village in Leicestershire, England

Coordinates: 52.52122°N 1.29474°W

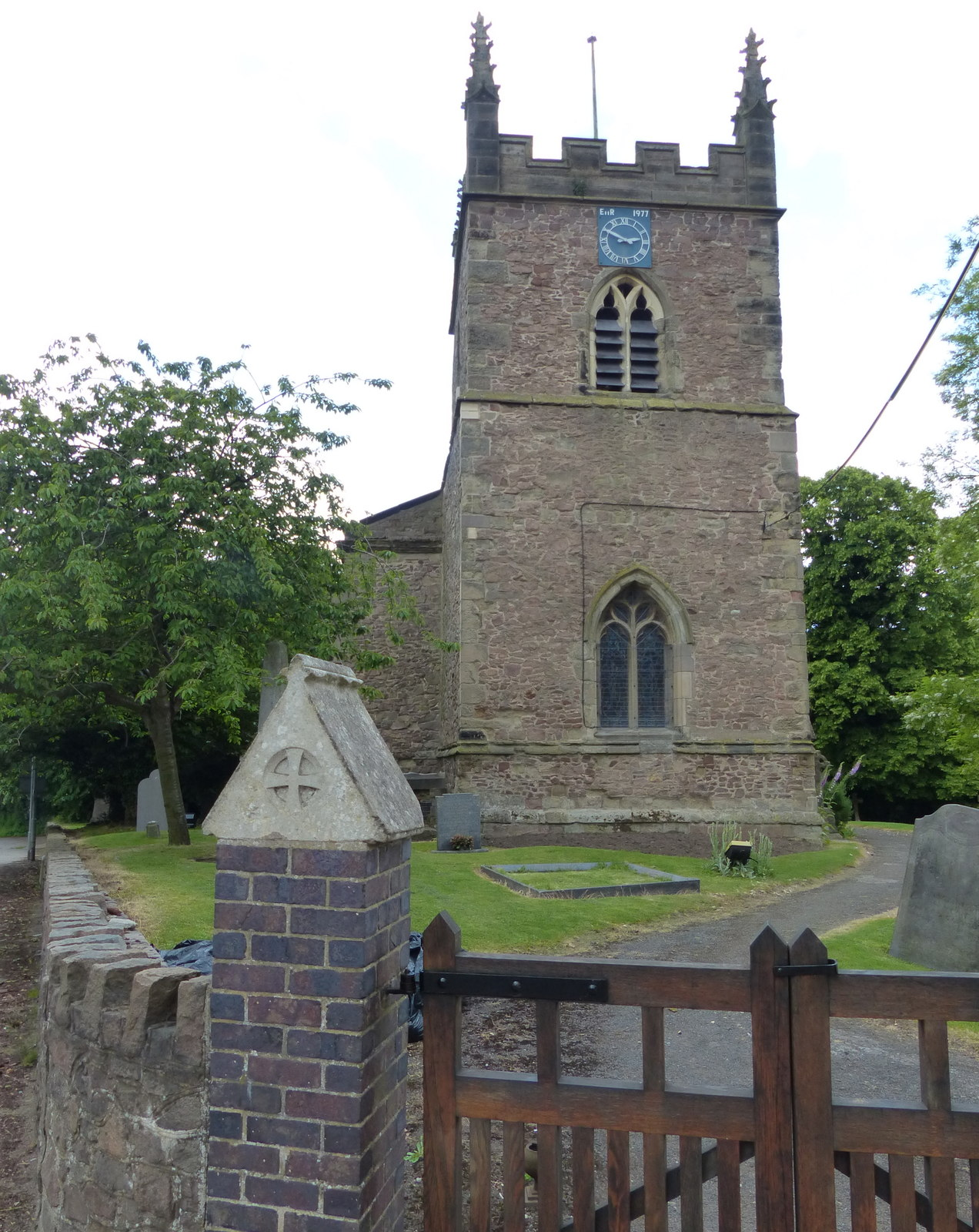
- Church of St Helen's

- Location within Leicestershire
- Population: 985 (2011)
- OS grid reference: SP482918
- District: Blaby
- Shire county: Leicestershire
- Region: East Midlands
- Country: England
- Sovereign state: United Kingdom
- Post town: Hinckley
- Postcode district: LE10
- Dialling code: 01455
- Police: Leicestershire
- Fire: Leicestershire
- Ambulance: East Midlands
- UK Parliament: South Leicestershire

Sharnford is a village and civil parish in the Blaby district of Leicestershire, England. The parish has a population of about 1,000, measured at the 2011 census as 985. The village is about four miles east of Hinckley, and is near to Aston Flamville, Wigston Parva and Sapcote.

== History ==
The Domesday hamlet or farmstead of Scerneford is mentioned in the tenth-century will of Wulfric Spot, earl of Mercia, and probably named after a "scearn" or muddy ford over the River Soar. It lies immediately north of High Cross, near the Roman station at Venonis (mentioned in the Antonine Itinerary) at the intersection of Roman Watling Street and the Fosse Way. Sharnford was originally a single vill, divided into two manors.

During the English Civil War soldiers from the local garrisons visited Sharnford in search of fresh horses and "provinder". In June, 1646 the Sharnford constables claimed for provender ("provinder") taken by Captain Flower of the Coventry garrison, Robert Day claiming £5 for a horse taken by Captain Merrer's men .

John Nichols the county antiquary, provides a fine illustration of the old Sharnford parsonage house that once stood alongside Sharnford church, home to Nichols Horton, the rector of Sharnford and Little Peatling who lived here from 1738 to 1793. By the turn of the century Sharnford had grown into a sizeable settlement, the national census recording a population of 373. Nichols describes the inhabitants as being mostly yeomen and tradesmen. There were no "titled great" and no acknowledged lord of the manor.

Sharnford has a Church of England Church (St Helen's), a Methodist Church, 6 domestic buildings, a War memorial, and a Monument that are Grade II listed. The village also has a Church of England Primary school, Post Office, two public houses (The Sharnford Arms, and The Bricklayers) and a motor repair garage.

== Sport and Leisure ==
Fosse Meadows has extensive paths through flower meadows, woodlands and arboretum, with a wildlife lake and bird hides. There is a permissive bridleway around the site marked by white topped posts. Fosse Meadows also has a permanent orienteering course, a children's play area with extensive play equipment.

Sharnford Cricket Club was an English amateur cricket club, situated on Lissman Fields, off Leicester Road. The history of the club dates back to at least the early 1900s, where evidence shows that Sharnford won the Lutterworth & District Village Cricket League Cup in 1903. The club later went on to join the Leicestershire & Rutland Cricket League, and in 2015 they achieved acclaim for winning one of the fastest cricket matches ever seen in Leicestershire, after they bowled out their opponents for eight runs and then won the game in just four balls, all within 50 minutes. The following year, 6 weeks into the cricket season, Sharnford had to withdraw from the League and cease activity due to a lack of players.

== Transport ==
Sharnford has one bus service which is operated by Arriva Fox County (X55) running approximately every 3 hours (each way) between Leicester and Hinckley.
