= Ashby de la Zouch Rural District =

Historical rural district

Coordinates: 52.74°N 1.44°W

Ashby de la Zouch Rural District was a rural district in England, near Ashby de la Zouch (which was an urban district). It was formed in 1894 along with most other rural districts. In 1974 it was abolished under the Local Government Act 1972, to form the non-metropolitan district of North West Leicestershire.

The district originally consisted of three detached fragments. The larger part was between Ashby and Coalville. The parish of Blackfordby, west of Ashby, was split between the urban districts of Ashby de la Zouch and Ashby Woulds in 1936, whilst the parish of Bardon, east of Coalville, remained a detached portion.

Notably, Richard Watson was stationed there at the start of the 19th century.
