= Thorpe Langton =

Village in Leicestershire, England

Coordinates: 52.5°N 0.9°W

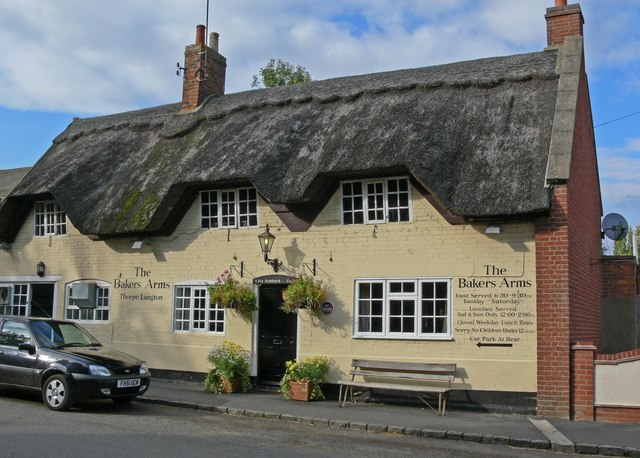
- The Bakers Arms pub

- Location within Leicestershire
- Population: 200 (2011 Census)
- OS grid reference: SP7463491584
- Civil parish: Thorpe Langton
- District: Harborough
- Shire county: Leicestershire
- Region: East Midlands
- Country: England
- Sovereign state: United Kingdom
- Post town: MARKET HARBOROUGH
- Postcode district: LE16
- Dialling code: 01858
- Police: Leicestershire
- Fire: Leicestershire
- Ambulance: East Midlands
- UK Parliament: Harborough, Oadby and Wigston

Thorpe Langton (derived from the Anglo-Saxon word for an enclosure, meaning "long town") is a village and civil parish in the Harborough district of Leicestershire, about four miles north of Market Harborough. The parish had a population of 171 according to the 2001 census. Ten years later, in the 2011 census, the population had grown to 200. Thorpe Langton is the home of the Baker's Arms pub and St. Leonard's church, but is otherwise solely residential.

== History ==
Thorpe Langton in the ancient county of Leicestershire was classed as a chapelry and township before becoming a modern civil parish in 1866. When it originated as a parish it became part of Market Harborough Poor Law Union which was established in 1834 under the reforms of the Poor Law Act. Market Harborough was Thorpe Langtons' sanitary, local government district and registration sub district.

Thorpe Langton is mentioned three times in the Domesday book of 1086, with a population of 29 households and tax assessed at 7.5 geld units. Thorpe Langton's land was held by three separate Tenants in Chief; Robert of Vessey, Robert of Bucy and Hugh of Grandmesnil. Robert of Vessey's estate in 1086 contained seven villagers, three small holders and six slaves. The estate became the Thorpe Langton manor when Sir William de Thorpe was assigned the land by Edward, Prince of Wales in 1366. The land eventually became part of the West Langton Hall estate when it was sold. The second estate, held by Robert of Bucy contained two villagers, eight smallholders and one slave. The Peverel Family were the main tenants in the later 13th century, and the estate was held by Walter de Langton (died 1321), Bishop of Coventry and Lichfield and Treasurer of England, a member of the Peverel family. The land was declared forfeit numerous times before it was passed to the Duchy of Lancaster where the Roberts Family were principle tenants for most of the 17th, 18th and 19th centuries. Mr Clement J. Kendall and the Kendall family are now the owners of the Roberts family land.

On 25 March 1885 Thorpe Langton did two land swaps with neighbouring civil parishes leading to boundary changes. The first exchange was with Welham, land known as Caudwell was given to Welham with land received in return. The second exchange was between Thorpe Langton and East Langton. Thorpe Langton received Vendy's Lodge, a house with a population of two, giving land in return.

== Demographics ==
Thorpe Langton's population was 186 in 1801, from 1821 the population gradually declined from 215 to 94 in 1961. Since 1961 the population has increased to 200 as measured in the 2011 census. The population reached its lowest figure of 83 twice in 1881 and 1921. Between 1871 and 1881 the population decreased by −44%. In 2011 50 people were aged between 45 and 49 compared to only 44 in 2001. The main industry in Thorpe Langton has also changed. In 1881 Agriculture employed 18 people but in the 2011 census only 14 people were employed in agriculture and 'Wholesale and Retail Trade; Repair of Motor Vehicles and Motor Cycles' took over as the main employer with 17 people working in this sector. Thorpe Langton is mainly residential with people travelling to work in the surrounding districts.

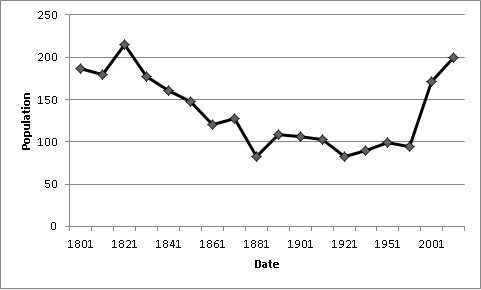
Total Population of Thorpe Langton. Data for 1801–1871 from Historical Population Reports;1881– 1961 from Vision of Britain through Time; 2001–2011 from Neighbourhood Statistics.

Thorpe Langton occupation statistics for 1881 gathered using information from Thorpe Langton's' Historic industry statistics available from Vision of Britain

== Religious sites ==
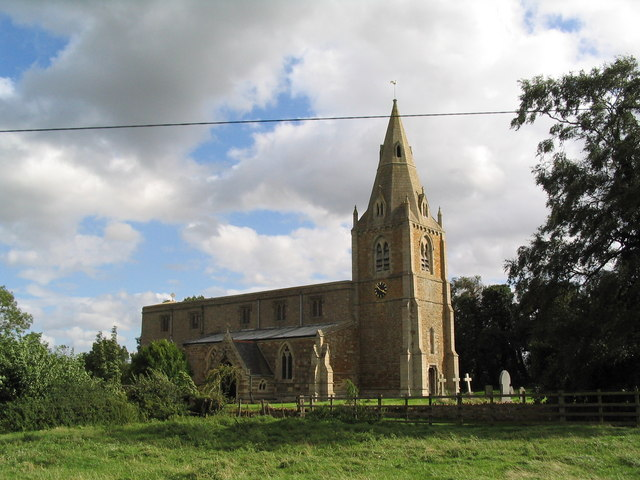
St Leonard's Church

St Leonard's based in Thorpe Langton is a Church of England Church. It is of medieval origin dating back to 13th – 15th century A.D. St Leonard church has a mother church based in Church Langton. In 1868 the church was restored by Joseph Goddard. In the late 19th century a burial ground was added with the first burial recorded in 1875. Two war memorials are based at the church. The brass ornaments on the altar give thanks to the safe return from World War One of Clement, Stanley and Gordon Kendall, the sons of George Edward Kendall the Lord of Thorpe Langton Manor. The other memorial is a Celtic style wheel cross in memory of H. G. Palmer who died in 1917 during World War One. The church is also mentioned in a historical Gazetteer by John Marius Wilson 'A church is here, as a chapel to Church-Langton; is a small old edifice, comprising nave, aisles, chancel, and S porch, with pinnacled-tower and octagonal spire.'

== Education ==
Church Langton Church of England Primary school is 1.3 miles away from Thorpe Langton. The school takes pupils from the age of four through to 11 and it has 200 pupils. An Ofsted inspection on 1 May 2013 rated the school as 'Good'. The area has a three tier school system with Kibworth High School and Community Technology College taking pupils from the age of 11 through to 14. The school is 2.7 miles away from Thorpe Langton and it has 640 pupils. The school was rated on 16 April 2013 by Ofted as 'Good'. The Robert Smyth Academy 3.3 miles away from Thorpe Langton has the older school intake from 14 to 19. The school has 1247 pupils and was rated by Ofsted on 11 December 2013 as 'requiring improvement'.

== Transport ==
The nearest train station to Thorpe Langton is Market Harborough 3.2 miles away. The main arrivals and departures from the station are to Nottingham and London St Pancras. Thorpe Langton has two bus stops serviced by Centrebus route 44. The nearest airport to Thorpe Langton is the East Midlands Airport which is 27.4 miles away.
