= Barrow upon Soar Rural District =

Former rural district in Leicestershire, England

Coordinates: 52.75°N 1.15°W

The rural district of Barrow upon Soar in Leicestershire, England, existed from 1894 to 1974.

It was established under the Local Government Act 1894 as a successor to the Barrow Rural Sanitary District, and therefore was also based on the Barrow Poor Law Union.

It covered Barrow upon Soar and the surrounding area. It was increased by the disbanding of Loughborough Rural District in 1936, and also by the abolition of Quorndon urban district around then. It was abolished under the Local Government Act 1972 and now forms part of the Charnwood district.
