= Loughborough Rural District =

Historical rural district

Coordinates: 52.75°N 1.2°W

The Loughborough Rural District was a rural district of Leicestershire, England, from 1894 to 1935–1936. It was created by the Local Government Act 1894 and covered that part of the Loughborough Rural Sanitary District in Leicestershire.

It was split, under the review caused by the Local Government Act 1929, to expand the existing Barrow upon Soar Rural District, Castle Donington Rural District, with parts going to various urban districts.
