= Leire =

Village in Leicestershire, England

Coordinates: 52.507°N 1.228°W

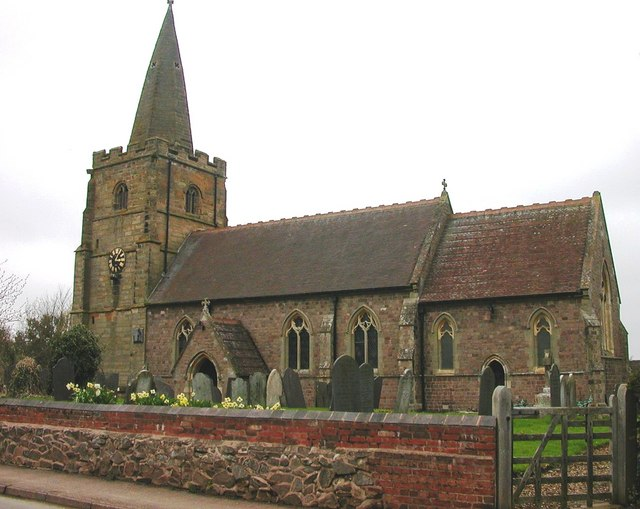
- St Peter's Church, Leire

- Location within Leicestershire
- Population: 587 (2011 Census)
- District: Harborough
- Shire county: Leicestershire
- Region: East Midlands
- Country: England
- Sovereign state: United Kingdom
- Post town: LUTTERWORTH
- Postcode district: LE17
- Dialling code: 01455
- Police: Leicestershire
- Fire: Leicestershire
- Ambulance: East Midlands
- UK Parliament: South Leicestershire

Leire is a village and civil parish in the Harborough district, in the county of Leicestershire, England. The name is thought to originate from the old British name for the river Soar, which has a tributary with a source south of the village. Present day Leire has a population of around 500, measured at 587 in the 2011 census. The village is north of Lutterworth.

Today Leire has two public houses, the Queen's Arms and the Crab and Cow, as well as a church, a village hall and a riding establishment.

Leire Village Hall is home to Leire pre-school group, Leire and Dunton Scout Group (which has a Beaver, Cub and Scout section) and a Pilates class.
