= Wigston Parva =

Hamlet in Leicestershire, England

Coordinates: 52°30′N 1°19′W

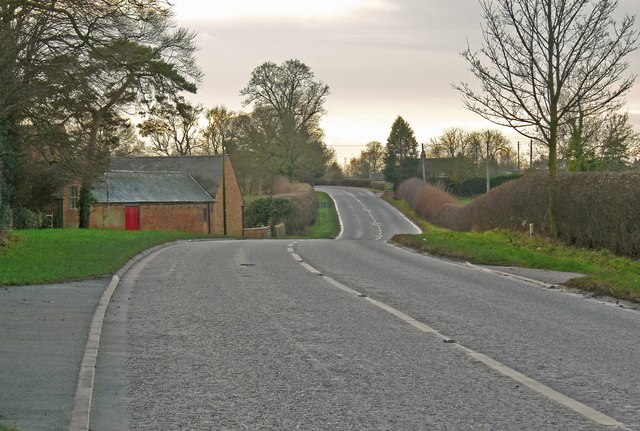
Coventry Road, Wigston Parva

Wigston Parva is a hamlet and civil parish in the Blaby district of Leicestershire, England. The parish has a population of about 30. It is very near the county boundary with Warwickshire. Nearby places include Smockington, and Sharnford. The population of the hamlet at the 2011 census was included in the civil parish of Aston Flamville.

There is evidence of a Roman fort at Wigston Parva, and although the hamlet has an entry in the Domesday Book, the name of the hamlet is first recorded in 1002, sixty years before the Domesday survey. The name Wigston is possibly Wicg's stone, with Wicg being a personal name. The addition of Parva came later (c. 1843) to distinguish it from other places named Wigston. It was also sometimes known as Little Wigston, and historically it was in the Guthlaxton Hundred.

The settlement has an Anglican church, St Mary the Virgin, parts of which date back to the 11th century. It is now a grade II listed building. The hamlet was made into a conservation area in 1976.
