= Glooston =

Village in Leicestershire, England

Coordinates: 52.555°N 0.895°W

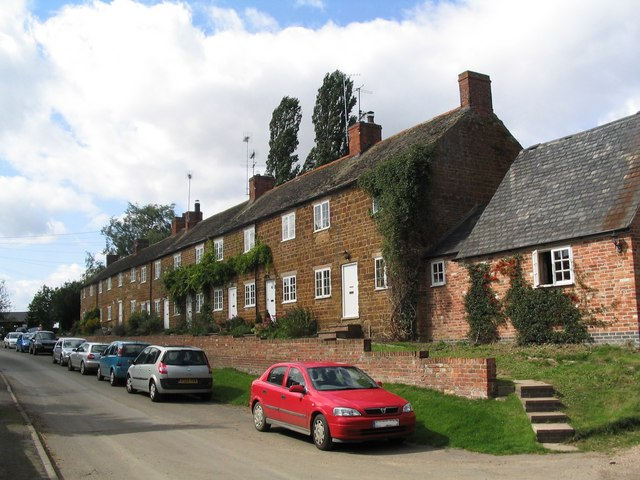
- Leicestershire Round through Glooston

- Location within Leicestershire
- Population: 147 (2011 Census)
- OS grid reference: SP750957
- Civil parish: Glooston
- District: Harborough
- Shire county: Leicestershire
- Region: East Midlands
- Country: England
- Sovereign state: United Kingdom
- Post town: MARKET HARBOROUGH
- Postcode district: LE16
- Police: Leicestershire
- Fire: Leicestershire
- Ambulance: East Midlands

Glooston is a small village and civil parish in the Harborough district of Leicestershire, England. According to the 2001 census the parish had a population of 54, increasing to 147 (including Cranoe and Stonton Wyville) at the 2011 census.

The village's name means 'farm/settlement of Glor'.

The parish covers an area of 973 acres (3.94 km^{2}) or 1.46 square miles (3.8 km^{2}). Its shape is long and narrow, being over 2 miles (3.2 km) in length north to south. The highest point in the parish is Crossburrow Hill, 400 feet (120 m) high.

The settlement of Glooston lies around a crossroads in the centre of the parish. There are several 17th- and 18th-century brick-built houses, and a terrace of early 19th-century stone-built cottages. The Roman Gartree Road crosses the village east to west and the site of a Roman villa, by a stream north-east of the crossroads, was excavated in 1946.

The manor of Glooston was recorded in the Domesday Book of 1086 as being held by Hugh de Grentemesnil. From 1180 to the middle of the 14th century the Basset family of Drayton were mesne tenants. The manor was held of the Bassets by the Harington family, and from c. 1412-1422 held by the Brauncepath family, through the marriage of Margaret Harington to Richard Brauncepath. The manor passed to John Colly, a distant Harington relative, in 1480 after a protracted legal dispute. His descendant Anthony Colly put the manor in trust in 1587 to pay an annuity of £100 for 60 years to a skinner, Randall Manning of London. This payment was in arrears by 1592, and possession of the manor passed to Manning. In 1614 Colly redeemed it for £1,500, and in 1632 he sold it to the Brudenell family for £4,500, in whose possession it has remained.

By the 17th century half of the agricultural land in the parish (to the north of the village) was enclosed and laid down to pasture as sheep runs. To the south of the village were three open fields, Little Field, Burrough or Crosborough Field, and Willowsike Field. These were enclosed in 1828, with a total area of 469 acres (1.90 km^{2}) being allotted. The lord of the manor, the Earl of Cardigan, who held the whole of the old enclosures, was allotted 56 acres (230,000 m^{2}). The Rev. J. H. Dent of Hallaton, whose family held an estate in Glooston, was allotted 236 acres (0.96 km^{2}). The Rector of Glooston was allotted 182 acres (0.74 km^{2}) in lieu of tithes and glebe.

The parish church of St John the Baptist was rebuilt in 1866-67 by the architect Joseph Goddard of Leicester. Goddard appears to have retained the plan of the original church, whose fabric was mostly of 15th- or 16th-century date. It has an aisleless nave, chancel, south porch and a double bell-cote.
