= Shangton =

Village in Leicestershire, England

Coordinates: 52.56153°N 0.93487°W

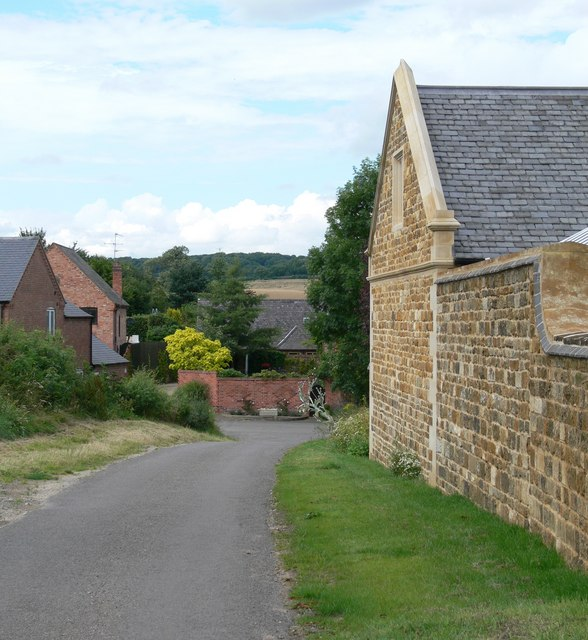
- Shangton (2007)

- Location within Leicestershire
- Area: 1.9789 sq mi (5.125 km^{2})
- Population: 125 (2011)
  - Density: 63/sq mi (24/km^{2})
- OS grid reference: SP723964
  - London: 80.38 mi (129.36 km) SE
- Civil parish: Shangton
- District: Harborough
- Unitary authority: Leicestershire
- Shire county: Leicestershire
- Ceremonial county: Leicestershire
- Region: East Midlands
- Country: England
- Sovereign state: United Kingdom
- Post town: LEICESTER
- Postcode district: LE8
- Dialling code: 01858
- Police: Leicestershire
- Fire: Leicestershire
- Ambulance: East Midlands
- UK Parliament: Harborough, Oadby and Wigston
- Website: Shangton Parish Council

Shangton is a parish and village 1 mile (2 km) north of Tur Langton in Leicestershire, England. The parish is part of the Harborough district. According to the University of Nottingham English Place-names project, the settlement name Shangton could mean 'shank farm/settlement', a long, narrow bent piece of ground; a narrow ridge or 'shank' projecting from high ground beside the village. The population of the civil parish at the 2011 census was approximately 125 (33 households).

== History ==
Mentioned in the Domesday Book Survey of 1086, Shangton was a settlement in the Hundred of Gartree, Leicestershire. In 1086, it had an estimate of 22.6 households, representing the heads of families (with an average 5 persons per household). The village Church of St. Nicholas is a Grade II* listed building, with the body of the church dating to the 13-15th century. The village of Shangton (spelt as Shankton) is clearly visible on the 1576 map of Warwickshire and Leicestershire, produced (in Latin) by Christopher Saxton as part of his Atlas of England and Wales, but no indication of village settlement size is shown. The line of the Gartree Roman road (Via_Devana) is 0.6 miles (1 km) north east of the village. This road was once the main route between Leicester and Rockingham prior to the building of the London Road turnpike in 1726. As a result of the turnpike, the Roman road soon fell into disrepair and only parts of it remain visible today.

In 1870–72, John Marius Wilson's Imperial Gazetteer of England and Wales described Shangton as follows:

"SHANGTON, a parish in Market-Harborough district, Leicester; 2¾ miles E N E of Kibworth r. station. Post-town, Leicester. Acres, 1, 590. Real property, £1, 969. Pop., 82. Houses, 16. The living is a rectory in the diocese of Peterborough Value, £360.* Patron, Sir C E. Isham, Bart. The church was restored in 1851, and the chancel rebuilt in 1863."
