= Market Bosworth Rural District =

Historical rural district

Coordinates: 52.62°N 1.40°W

The rural district of Market Bosworth existed from 1894 to 1974 in Leicestershire, England. It was named after Market Bosworth, and was created under the Local Government Act 1894, based on the Market Bosworth rural sanitary district, and that part of the Atherstone rural sanitary district which was in Leicestershire.

The parish of Higham on the Hill was added in 1936, from the Hinckley Rural District, which had been abolished under a County Review Order.

In 1974 most of the district merged with Hinckley to form the new Hinckley and Bosworth district, apart from Ibstock, which went to North West Leicestershire.
