= Claybrooke Magna =

Village in Leicestershire, England

Coordinates: 52.494167°N 1.2775°W

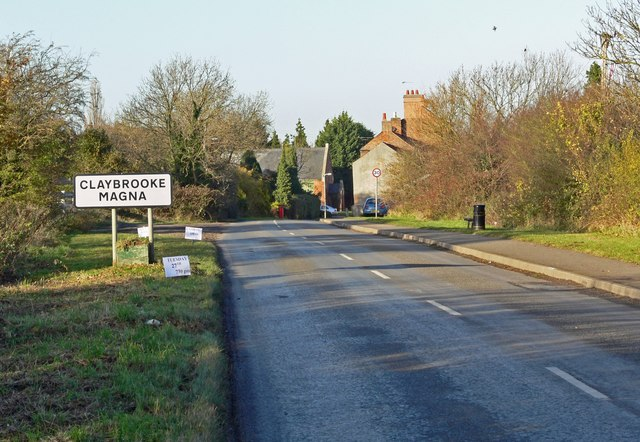
- Bell View Court, Claybrooke Magna

- Location within Leicestershire
- Population: 613 (2011 Census)
- OS grid reference: SP4904688759
- Civil parish: Claybrooke Magna
- District: Harborough
- Shire county: Leicestershire
- Region: East Midlands
- Country: England
- Sovereign state: United Kingdom
- Post town: LUTTERWORTH
- Postcode district: LE17
- Dialling code: 01455
- Police: Leicestershire
- Fire: Leicestershire
- Ambulance: East Midlands
- UK Parliament: South Leicestershire

Claybrooke Magna is a village and civil parish in the Harborough district of Leicestershire, England, close to the A5 trunk road. The village is located between junctions 20 and 21 of the M1, and the towns of Leicester, Rugby, Lutterworth and Market Harborough are easily accessible.

== History ==
The village's name means 'brook with clayey soil'.

Claybrooke Magna with Claybrooke Parva were listed in the Domesday Book of 1086 as being within the wapentake of Guthlaxton, which centuries later was referred to as a hundred. The manor was managed by a local lord named Fulco, who was subordinate to the tenant-in-chief, the wise and powerful Robert de Beaumont, 1st Earl of Leicester.

According to information sourced from the Vision of Britain in the 1870s, Claybrooke was described as:

"CLAYBROOKE, two townships in Lutterworth district, Leicester; and a parish partly also in Warwick. One of the townships bears the name of Great Claybrooke; lies near the junction of Watling-street and the Fosse way, 1 mile WSW of Ullesthorpe r. station, and 4 NW of Lutterworth; occupies high ground, commanding an extensive view; includes the site of the Roman station Vennonæ; and has a post office, of the name of Claybrooke, under Lutterworth. Pop., 424. Houses, 103. The other township bears the name of Little Claybrooke; and lies contiguous to Great Claybrooke. ..."

The population and wealth of the region grew, leading locally to partition of the ancient parish of Claybrooke into the civil parish of Claybrook Magna and the adjoining civil parish of Claybrooke Parva in the late 1800s.

Claybrooke Magna has seven grade II listed buildings. Including the Claybrooke Mill House, Manor Farmhouse, Dairy Farmouse, Claybrooke Mill, Claybrooke Mill House, Ashleigh and the Dairy Farmhouse. The Watermill dates from 1763 and was extended in 1840. It is stated that milling has taken place at the watermill for over 1000 years and most of the mill machinery is still intact and the mill continues to be in commercial operation. In 2014, Miller Sally Craven produces over 40 different varieties of flour at the Watermill. There is a varied product range and includes traditional flour types as well as unusual blends such as Chilli Flour Mix and Spicy Tomato Flour Mix which shows how the mill has diversified since its establishment in 1763. These products are sold and available from local outlets.

The Dairy Farmhouse includes an early 17th-century stable which was altered in the late 17th century. It is thought that the stable was originally part of an agricultural complex. It became a listed building on 30 September 1993.

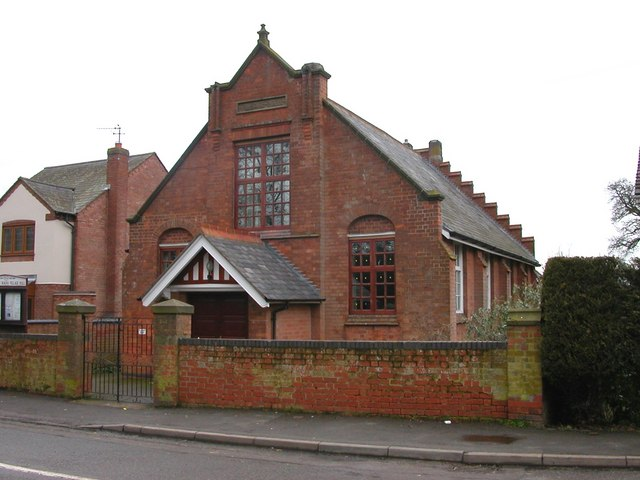
Claybrooke Magna Village Hall - geograph.org.uk - 134506

Claybrooke Village Hall is a traditional Victorian building located along the main street, which has been modernised in recent years to offer facilities for social and sporting events within the local community. It can accommodate up to 100 people in the main hall and the Meeting Room has space for up to 30.

In the 1960s new homes were built in Claybrooke on the site of the original woodyard and listed buildings Claybrooke Mill and Claybrooke Hall were refurbished. Although local amenities diminished resulting in the village shop and post office closing.

In 1972 Whitmores Timbers relocated their site in Bury St Edmunds to its current centrally located site within the village of Claybrooke Magna. The remains of the chapel still remain in Claybrooke but serve the purpose of storing machinery from the woodyard.

Claybrooke Magna has previously accommodated three pubs within the village, one of these being 'The Blue Bell' which was closed in the 1920s and had an alternate use as a bakehouse after closure. In 1986 it was recorded as being the private house of 'The White House' but according to records has since been demolished. 'The Royal Oak' was situated on the Main Road and was known as The Woodcutter at time of closure.

In 1997, TV actor Barry Evans was found dead at his home in Claybrooke Magna. A youth was charged with attempted murder but later released. The exact circumstances surrounding his death remain a mystery.

== Demographics ==
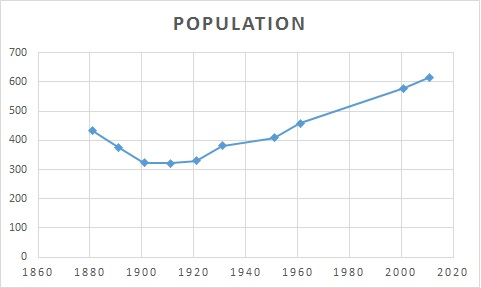
Total population of Claybrooke Magna Civil parish, Leicestershire, as reported by the Census of Population from 1881 to 2011

According to the 2011 Census, Claybrooke Magna had a population of 613. There were also 222 households in the area. The Topographical Dictionary of England was published in 1848 and details the population of Greater Claybrooke as 514 and Little Claybrooke as 104.

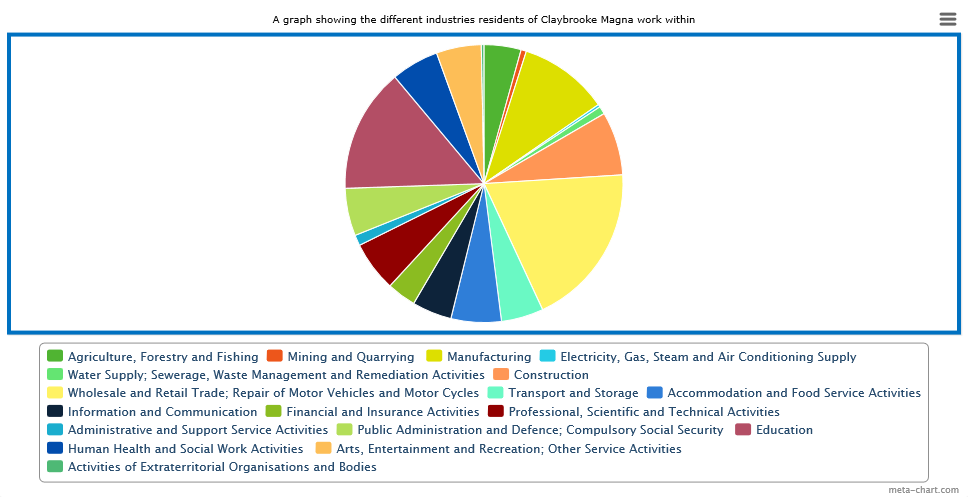
Pie chart showing population of Claybrooke Magna in different industry sectors using census data

Historically in Claybrooke Magna, men were employed by the timber mill or worked on the land, but now few men who live within Claybrooke Magna are employed in this sort of primary and secondary employment. The 2001 census found that 26.7% of residents work within the extractive and manufacturing industries, whereas 73.3% work in the service industries. This trend is concordant with the trend within England as it was found that in 2011, less than one in 100 people worked in agriculture in England and Wales. In 2014, there is unemployment among younger members of Claybrooke Magna which could be attributed poor public transport facilities and a large majority of the working population commute to larger towns within the area such as Leicester or Coventry for work.
