= Dunton Bassett =

Village in Leicestershire, England

Coordinates: 52°30′37″N 1°11′45″W

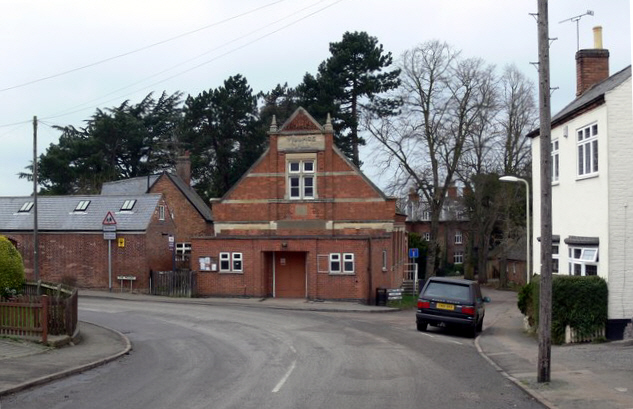
- Dunton Bassett Village Hall

- Location within Leicestershire
- Population: 759 (2011 Census)
- District: Harborough
- Shire county: Leicestershire
- Region: East Midlands
- Country: England
- Sovereign state: United Kingdom
- Post town: LUTTERWORTH
- Postcode district: LE17
- Dialling code: 01455
- Police: Leicestershire
- Fire: Leicestershire
- Ambulance: East Midlands
- UK Parliament: South Leicestershire

Dunton Bassett is a small village in the Harborough district of Leicestershire, England. It lies between Leicester and Lutterworth, and close to Broughton Astley, Ashby Magna & Leire. It had a population of 795 at the 2001 United Kingdom census, falling to 759 at the 2011 census.

== History ==
The village's name means 'farm/settlement on a hill'. The village was held by Radulfus Basset in 1166.

The Great Central main railway line, the last main line to be built from the north of England to London, was opened on 15 March 1899 and ran just to the east of Dunton Bassett, separating it from the village of Ashby Magna, and a station was provided bearing Ashby's name, although it was much the smaller village of the two. Dunton Bassett gave its name to a short (92 yard) tunnel just south of the station. The line closed on 5 May 1969. In its latter years it had been joined by the M1 motorway which ran parallel to it on the eastern side.

== Amenities ==
The village has one pub (the Dunton Bassett Arms), a primary school and village hall. The village hall was donated to the village by Orson Wright, a successful Leicester builder who had been born in the village. The combined village shop / post office closed in 2018.

== Sport ==
Dunton Bassett Cricket Club was established in 1870 and their ground is located on Lutterworth Road, due east of the village. They have two senior teams playing in the Leicestershire and Rutland Cricket League and an active Junior section for ages 4–17 in the Leicestershire Youth League. Willoughby Waterleys Cricket Club also rented use of Dunton Bassett CC facilities from the early 1990s-2015.
