= Cranoe =

Village in Leicestershire, England

Coordinates: 52.548°N 0.880°W

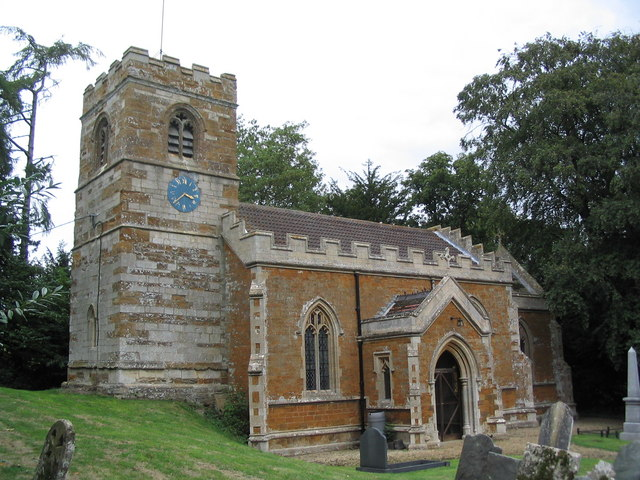
- Church of St Michael and All Angels

- Location within Leicestershire
- District: Harborough
- Shire county: Leicestershire
- Region: East Midlands
- Country: England
- Sovereign state: United Kingdom
- Post town: MARKET HARBOROUGH
- Postcode district: LE16
- Police: Leicestershire
- Fire: Leicestershire
- Ambulance: East Midlands
- UK Parliament: Rutland and Stamford

Cranoe is a small village and civil parish in the Harborough district of Leicestershire, England. The parish had a population of 35 in 2001. The population remained less than 100 and was included in the civil parish of Glooston.

== The village ==
The village's name means 'hill spur frequented with crows'.

Despite its small size, Cranoe was once a thriving village, with a post office (now Post Office Cottage), a pub (the Cardigan Arms, now Cardigan Cottage), and a school (now The School House on School Lane) which used to cater to three surrounding villages: Glooston, Welham and Hallaton. The village still has two farms and is surrounded by sloping green fields, populated by sheep almost all year round.

The village has declined in the twentieth century, leaving just a handful of cottages and the church.

The population in 1901 was 98. By 1951 there were 41 inhabitants. There are only two remaining residents of Cranoe who remember it in its former glory, one of whom used to live in Glooston, and used to walk to school in Cranoe every day before it was closed in favour of Hallaton C of E school. By rights Cranoe should be classed as a hamlet if it were rated on the number of houses and residents; however the survival of the parish church of St Michael means that it retains status as a village.

The land on which Cranoe now sits is owned by the Brudenell Estate, hence nearly all the property apart from the church is rented from the estate, including both farms.

In 2006, one of the larger stained-glass windows from the church was stolen.

== Bottle-kicking ==
Cranoe has never picked a definite side when playing in the annual tournament of "Bottle-kicking", deciding not to choose between Hallaton and Medbourne, but acting more as a freelance force, helping whichever side is losing until the last minute, when they then switch (if necessary) to the winning side.
