= Castle Donington Rural District =

Historical rural district in England

Coordinates: 52.82°N 1.32°W

The rural district of Castle Donington is a former local government area of Leicestershire, England, formed in 1894 and abolished in 1974.

== History ==
It was formed by the Local Government Act 1894 from the part of the Shardlow Rural Sanitary District that was in Leicestershire. In the 1930s it gained a few parishes from the disbanding of Loughborough Rural District. The district was merged into the North West Leicestershire district under the Local Government Act 1972.

== Parishes ==
At its abolition, Castle Donington Rural District included the following parishes:

- Belton (from Loughborough RD)
- Breedon on the Hill
- Castle Donington
- Charley (from Loughborough RD)
- Diseworth
- Hemington
- Isley cum Langley
- Kegworth
- Lockington Hemington
- Long Whatton (from Loughborough RD)
