= Great Easton, Leicestershire =

Village in Leicestershire, England

Coordinates: 52.529°N 0.752°W

Great Easton
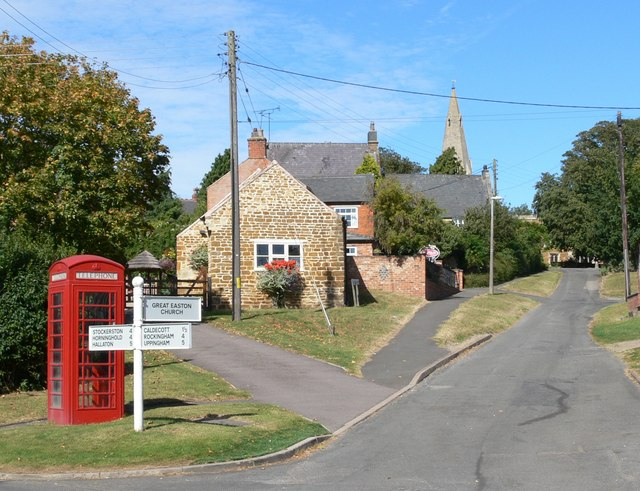
- Church Bank, Great Easton

- Location within Leicestershire
- Population: 671 (2011 Census)
- District: Harborough
- Shire county: Leicestershire
- Region: East Midlands
- Country: England
- Sovereign state: United Kingdom
- Post town: MARKET HARBOROUGH
- Postcode district: LE16
- Dialling code: 01536
- Police: Leicestershire
- Fire: Leicestershire
- Ambulance: East Midlands
- UK Parliament: Rutland and Stamford

Great Easton is a village and civil parish in the Harborough district of Leicestershire, England. The parish had a population of 558 according to the 2001 census, increasing to 671 at the 2011 census.

== Overview ==
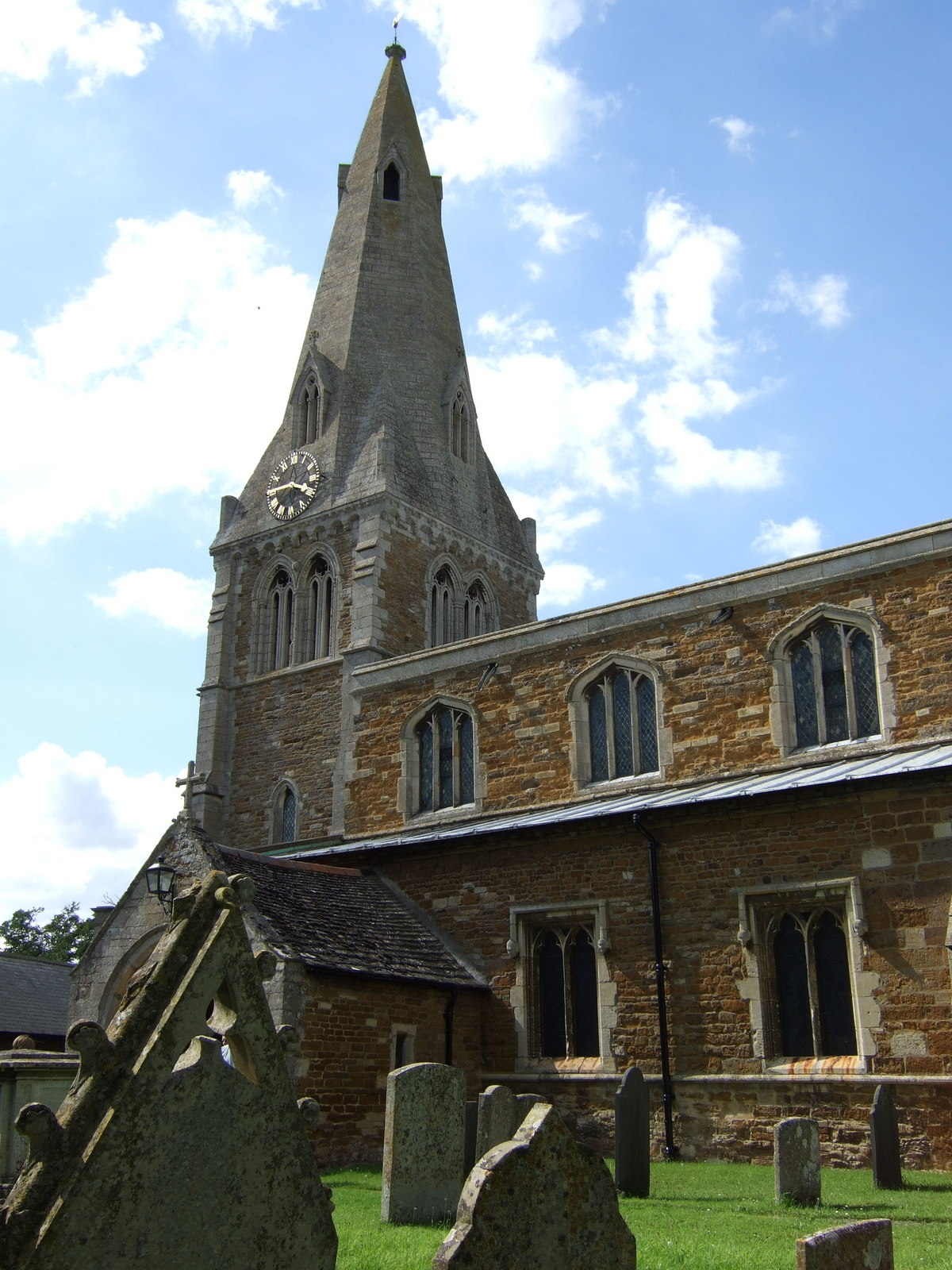
St Andrew's Church, Great Easton

The village's name means 'eastern farm/settlement'.

The village sits in the Welland Valley in the rolling south Leicestershire countryside. It is located in the extreme south-east of the county and is very close to the borders with Northamptonshire and Rutland; it is just south of the Eyebrook Reservoir. Nearby places are Bringhurst and Drayton in Leicestershire, Caldecott in Rutland, and Rockingham and Cottingham in Northamptonshire. The nearest town is Corby in Northamptonshire.

St Andrew's is the Church of England parish church. It is a Grade II* listed building.

The village has public transport services to Corby town centre, Oakham and Uppingham, Market Harborough town centre and St Margaret's Bus Station in Leicester.

The village formerly had a cricket team, but after the playing field was destroyed they relocated to Rockingham Castle and now go by the name of Old Eastonians Cricket Club.

Newspapers available in Great Easton include the Harborough Mail and the Northamptonshire Evening Telegraph. Radio stations that can be picked up in the village are Smooth East Midlands, Harborough FM, BBC Radio Northampton and BBC Radio Leicester.

Great Easton is also home to the Opera Minima, which is an opera/theatre group registered as a charitable trust and based at the Old Corset Factory in the village and is sponsored by Leicestershire County Council, Harborough District Council, Creative LeicesterShire and the Welland Sub-Regional Strategic Partnership.

The parish is protected and served by Leicestershire Constabulary (Harborough North Division).

The local telephone dialling code is the Kettering and Corby code (01536) due to its proximity to Northamptonshire.

Great Easton is the largest village and civil parish in South-East Leicestershire, however is only a small village itself. Many people who live in Great Easton commute to work in the nearby towns of Corby and Kettering in neighbouring Northants, to Market Harborough and indeed the county town, Leicester.

== Local government and politics ==
Great Easton is a civil parish in the Harborough District however, as the boundaries of Harborough Parliamentary constituency differ from those of the district, it forms part of the Rutland and Melton Parliamentary constituency. Great Easton is in the Nevill Ward of Harborough District Council and is represented by Cllr Michael Rickman (Con).

== Time Team ==
In 2003 Great Easton was visited by the archaeological television programme Time Team and the finds included 14th-century pottery, a brick surface thought to be related to the village's old slaughterhouse and a Chinese "cash coin". It appeared on Channel 4 as part of Time Team's Big Dig. The Chinese coin was placed in the ground for a joke by a local and made the feature in that episode.
