= Horninghold =

Village in Leicestershire, England

Coordinates: 52.5631°N 0.80612°W

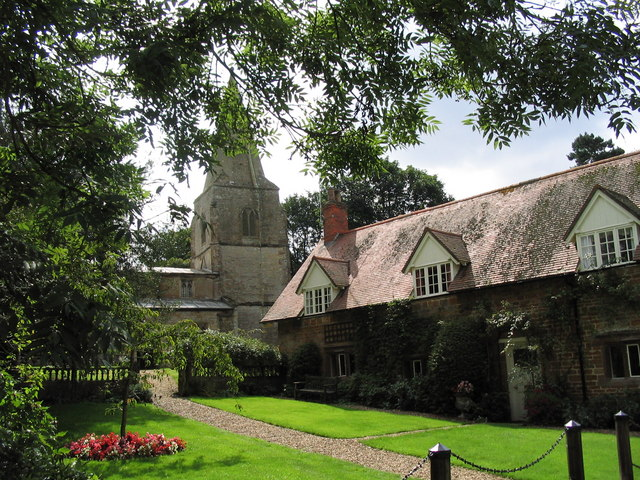

- Location within Leicestershire
- Population: 278
- OS grid reference: SP810968
- District: Harborough
- Shire county: Leicestershire
- Region: East Midlands
- Country: England
- Sovereign state: United Kingdom
- Post town: Market Harborough
- Postcode district: LE16
- Dialling code: 01858
- Police: Leicestershire
- Fire: Leicestershire
- Ambulance: East Midlands
- UK Parliament: Rutland and Stamford

Horninghold is a small village and parish seven miles north-east of Market Harborough in the county of Leicestershire. The population of the civil parish (including Allexton and Stockerston) was 278 at the 2021 census.

The village's name means 'wood belonging to the people of Horning'.

Following the Norman Conquest in 1066 the village was given to Robert de Todeni, Lord of Belvoir. In about 1076 he gave the parish to Belvoir Priory where it remained until the Dissolution of the Monasteries in the 16th century. At the beginning of the 20th century, the estate owners, the Hardcastle family remodelled the village as a garden village with many trees and shrubs.

The church of St Peter is a Grade II* listed building. It was built in the 12th century and is a surviving example of a Church of England parish church without Victorian restoration.
