= Tur Langton =

Village in Leicestershire, England

Coordinates: 52.545°N 0.949°W

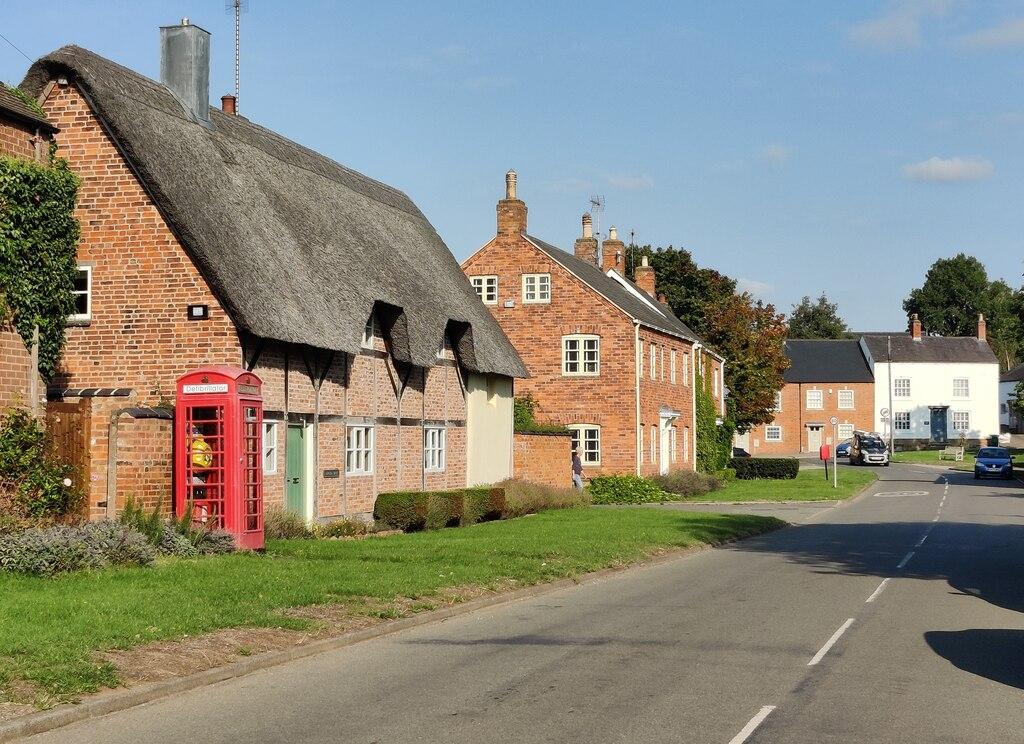
- The Main Street (2022)

- Location within Leicestershire
- Area: 2.2048 sq mi (5.710 km^{2})
- Population: 316 (2011)
  - Density: 143/sq mi (55/km^{2})
- OS grid reference: SP71409458
  - London: 79.48 mi (127.91 km) SE
- Civil parish: Tur Langton
- District: Harborough
- Shire county: Leicestershire
- Region: East Midlands
- Country: England
- Sovereign state: United Kingdom
- Post town: LEICESTER
- Postcode district: LE8
- Dialling code: 01858
- Police: Leicestershire
- Fire: Leicestershire
- Ambulance: East Midlands
- UK Parliament: Harborough, Oadby and Wigston
- Website: Tur Langton Parish Council

Tur Langton (derived from the Anglo-Saxon word for an enclosure, meaning "long town") is a small village and civil parish in the Harborough district, in the heart of Leicestershire in England. Tur Langton is home to St Andrews Church and The Crown Inn, situated in the centre of the village. The next nearest settlement of significant size is the civil parish Kibworth Harcourt, 2.11 miles (3 km) west of Tur Langton. According to the 2011 census, Tur Langton had a population (including Shangton) of 316.

== History ==
=== General history ===
One of the earliest recorded mentions of the existence of Tur Langton is found in the Domesday Book of 1086. However, in the Domesday Book, Tur Langton is listed as 'Terlintone'. Tur Langton's present day name does not appear to have been established until at least the late 16th century, despite its inclusion in the small hundred of Langton in the 1130 Leicestershire Survey and the parish itself being recognised as part of the ecclesiastical parish of Church Langton since 1220.

In July 1645, King Charles briefly visited Tur Langton to rest and water his horse in his departure from the Battle of Naseby. The battle, which took place in June of the same year in the village of Naseby, Northamptonshire, was a decisive battle in the Civil War in which parliament's New Model Army defeated King Charles' main field army. The well, a chalybeate spring in the eastern half of the parish, at which King Charles watered his horse still stands in Tur Langton today, now named 'King Charles Well'.

In the 1870s, the Imperial Gazetteer of England and Wales described Tur Langton as:

"...a township, with a village, in Church-Langton parish, Leicester; 2 miles E by N of Kibworth r. station, and 5¼ N of Market-Harborough. Real property, £3,278. Pop., 337. Houses, 90. A church is here, as a chapel to Church-Langton; is a small old building with a turret; and was about to be restored in 1864, at a cost of about £1,000. There is also an Independent chapel. Charles I., in his flight from the battle of Naseby, watered his horse here, at a place still called King Charles' Well."

=== Buildings of significance and residencies ===
==== The Manor House ====
Now part of a farm, the former Manor House stands at the end of a short avenue at the west end of the village. Made of stone, it was constructed on an H-shaped plan dating from the 17th century, standing two stories tall. All that remains today is the central block, which originally contained a great hall. Although there is no record of its structural history before its 17th century plans, there are records of the manor's ownership. Up until the 17th century, the reigning Archbishop of York was regarded as the overlord of the manor, which was attached to the manor of Southwell, Nottinghamshire. One of the longest family ownerships of the manor was by the Maunsell family. Prior to 1166, the Archbishop of York at the time had granted residency of the manor to Robert Maunsell, a residency which remained in the hands of his male descendants until 1352. Robert Maunsell did lose the manor for four years during this period (1216-1220) as a result of rebellion; the manor was forfeited to the crown and King John granted the manor to Hugh de Luterington. Following the Maunsell's residency, the manor changed hands several times in the succeeding centuries, switching families through marriage and changes of the Archbishop of York.

==== The old Chapel and St Andrews Church ====
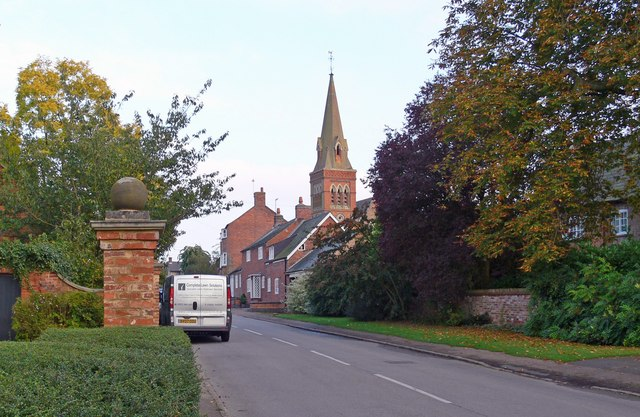
St Andrews Church (2007)

Before the construction of St Andrews Church in 1866, Tur Langton's sole place of worship was a small chapel, which was reported to be a 'wretched structure' as early as 1832. The majority of the old chapel was disassembled whilst the new church was being built. St Andrews church, designed by Joseph Goddard, was funded by Hanbury's Charity; this was a fund of approximately £2000 left by the Reverend William Hanbury upon his death for the purpose of the construction of features, such as churches, in the local area. Built on Main Street and still standing today, the church was fashioned in a Victorian Style and dedicated to St Andrew.

==== Residencies and other buildings ====
The majority of the residencies on Main Street are built of red brick or ironstone, with most houses containing ceiling beams inscribed with the house's date of construction. Despite significant rebuilding of Tur Langton from 1700 onwards, many houses contain ceiling beams which display a 17th-century origin. There is some social housing in Tur Langton, built in the 1930s and 1940s. Towards the west end of Main Street is Tur Langton's village hall. A wooden army hut bought from Cannock Chase, Staffordshire, it was constructed by public subscription after World War I.

== Demographics ==
=== Population ===
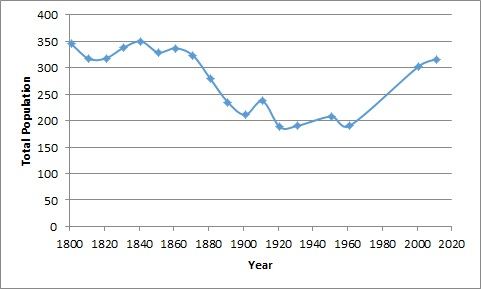
A time series of Tur Langton's population, 1801-2011.

Variations in the population of Tur Langton, although potentially caused by natural birth and death rates, may be a consequence of its changes in classification. Before 1866, Tur Langton was classified as either a 'township' or 'chapelry' within the Church Langton parish of Leicester County, in the ancient hundred of Gartree, in the southern section of the county. Upon the opening of St Andrews church, Tur Langton was granted a modern civil parish classification. These changes in classification could have altered the physical boundaries of what was seen to be Tur Langton which, in turn, may have affected population counts; for example, the population dropping under the 300 mark after the classification change in 1866. Other peaks or dips in population from this date on are most likely due to either natural variations in birth and death rates or further minor boundary changes.

=== Occupational History ===
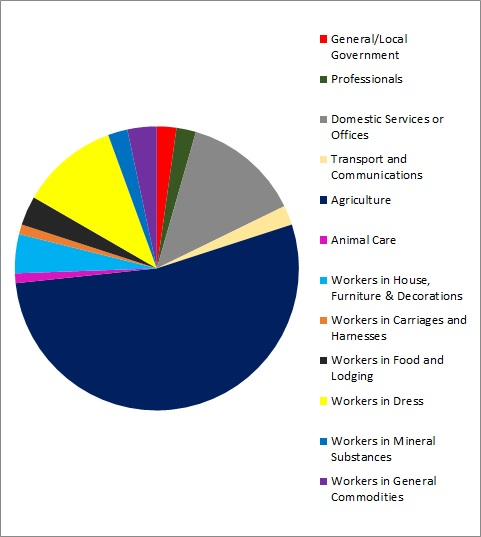
Occupations of the 1881 population of Tur Langton, excluding the 57 people whose occupation information is unknown.

After analysing data from 1881 records of the residents of Tur Langton's occupations, it is clear that at the time of the records, there appeared to be no specific purpose for Tur Langton itself, i.e. there are no large numbers of workers in a specialised field. Of the 90 people surveyed in the record, 53% worked in agriculture, reflecting the non-specialist nature of the village at the time. The majority of workers were simply sustaining the population. If you look further into this statistic, it is evident that 96% of these agricultural workers were men. Furthermore, 77% of all the known workers residing in Tur Langton were men. This emphasises the attitudes of these times as men were seen as the earners within households and families. The records also show that two of the 1881 residents were employed by the local or national government, so there may have been some form of authority in Tur Langton held by these individuals. Finally, there were 57 females residing in Tur Langton at the time of these records whose occupation is unknown. They may not have had employment; if so this again supports the attitudes of the times.

If you compare these 1881 records with 2011 records taken from the last census, there are vast changes in the fields in which people are employed. The most popular form of employment in 2011 was in 'Wholesale and Retail Trade or Repair of Motor Vehicles and Motor Cycles' with 16.2% of the 160 strong workforce working in this sector. In contrast, the most popular sector in 1881 (Agriculture), only employed 5 people (or 3.1%) in 2011, then known as 'Agriculture, Foresting and Fishing'. However, the biggest difference in employment across this time frame is that now transport is widely accessible, many more people can work outside of Tur Langton. It is quite likely that the majority or all of the 90 people surveyed in the 1881 records worked within Tur Langton.

=== Education ===
Records of schools situated in Tur Langton itself reveals the existence of a private day school, established in 1825, teaching small numbers of local children. Following this, a local woman named Mary Guttridge ran a small school up until the 1880s in a cottage. Every Sunday, Guttridge would accompany her students to a congregational school at Kibworth Harcourt. Currently, there are no schools situated in Tur Langton. The nearest primary school is in Church Langton, approximately 1.5 miles to the south-east, and the nearest secondary school is in Kibworth, approximately 2.5 miles to the south-west.
