= A606 road =

Road in East Midlands

A606

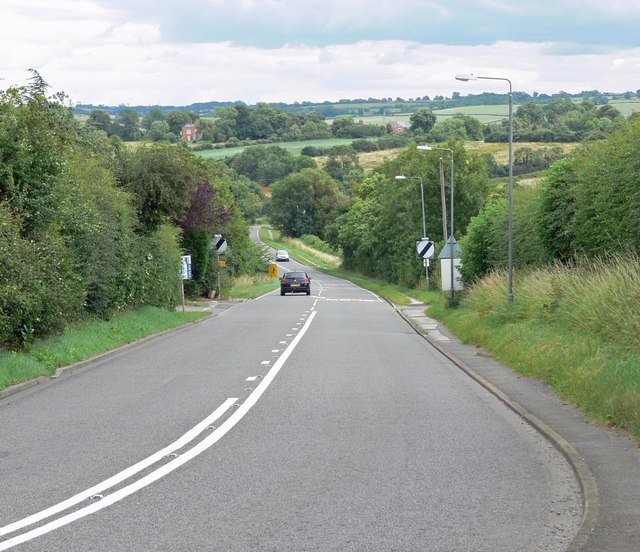
- A606 Melton Road near Upper Broughton

Route information
- Length: 38.4 mi (61.8 km)

Major junctions
- East end: Stamford, Lincolnshire
- A6121; A1 A6003 A607; A46; A52; A60
- To: Nottingham

Location
- Country: United Kingdom
- Constituent country: England

Road network
- Roads in the United Kingdom; Motorways; A and B road zones
← A605	→ A607

The A606 is an A road in England that starts in West Bridgford, on the outskirts of Nottingham, and heads southeastwards through Leicestershire and the towns of Melton Mowbray and Oakham, terminating at Stamford, Lincolnshire on the former Great North Road.

== History ==
The route in earlier times was a far more important route than it is today. It was the main road from Nottingham to London. The turnpike went from Nottingham via Melton and Oakham to Kettering (to join today's A6), and then on to London, run by the Nottingham, Melton and Kettering Turnpike Trust from 1758. The turnpike trusts were abolished in 1880, the year that the railway line to Melton opened. The trains would run until 1968.

In May 2026, the £131m North and East Melton Mowbray Distributor Road, officially named Pork Pie Way, opened to traffic, taking through-traffic out of Melton Mowbray town centre by bypassing the town around its northern and eastern perimeter.

== Route ==
=== Nottingham to Melton ===
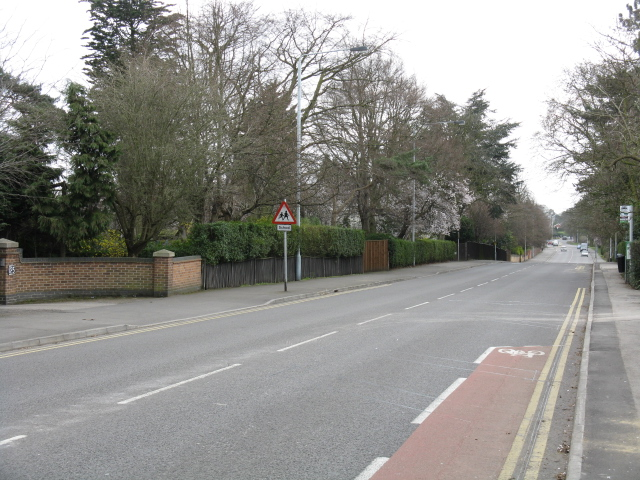
Melton Road in Edwalton

The road begins a few hundred yards south of Nottinghamshire County Hall (built in 1937), in West Bridgford in the district of Rushcliffe, at the traffic lights junction of the A60 (for Loughborough) and the B679 (for Wilford). The section to Melton follows the former railway from Nottingham to Melton, now the Old Dalby Test Track, and to the A46 junction is only a few hundred metres apart. The line then continued from Melton to Oakham, then on to Corby and Kettering, and was the fastest route to Nottingham by train from St Pancras. It followed the exact line of the former turnpike.

It begins as Melton Road, and passes two churches then crosses the former railway line to Melton, and the BP Melton Road Filling Station. There is traffic lights at a crossroad for Valley Road, to the left, and Boundary Road, to the right (for Rushcliffe Leisure Centre and Rushcliffe School). In Edwalton, the road then crosses the former railway, where a few hundred metres further south it is still accessible by train. To the right is Wheatcrofts garden centre (started by Harry Wheatcroft) and the road meets the A52 at a busy roundabout, where the road exits to the east as a trunk road.

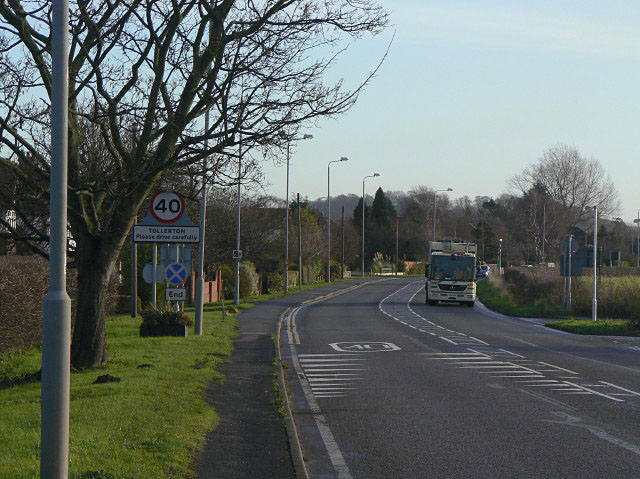
Entering Tollerton from the low bridge

There is a 14 ft 6 in low bridge (the former railway), so there is a turning point for high vehicles. For the next mile the road is the parish boundary between Tollerton to the left, and Plumtree, to the right. It passes Tollerton post office and there is traffic lights for Tollerton Lane (for Nottingham Airport), where there is the Total Lane End Garage. The road becomes the parish boundary between Plumtree and Normanton-on-the-Wolds, to the left. The former A606 used to go through both villages before 1930. At the end of the joint bypass, there is a right turn for the British Geological Survey. It passes through Stanton-on-the-Wolds. At the junction for Keyworth, there is the Murco Wolds Service Station. At a crossroads, there is access to Widmerpool, to the right, and the former Widmerpool railway station. The road meets the dual-carriageway A46 at an interchange. This point is the southern end of the A46 Newark to Widmerpool Improvement.

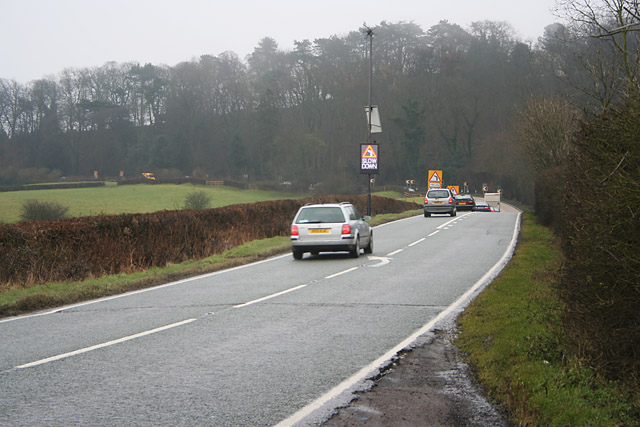
Broughton Hill

At Hickling Pastures, it passes Turnpike Farm, and there is a left turn for Hickling. The road becomes more hilly, and it passes through Upper Broughton and its Golden Fleece. Crossing the Dalby Brook, the road enters Leicestershire and the district of Melton. In Broughton and Old Dalby, it passes through Nether Broughton, and its Anchor Inn and Red House. The road is crossed by a pylon line, and ascends Broughton Hill where the road rises 80 metres in 0.5 km.

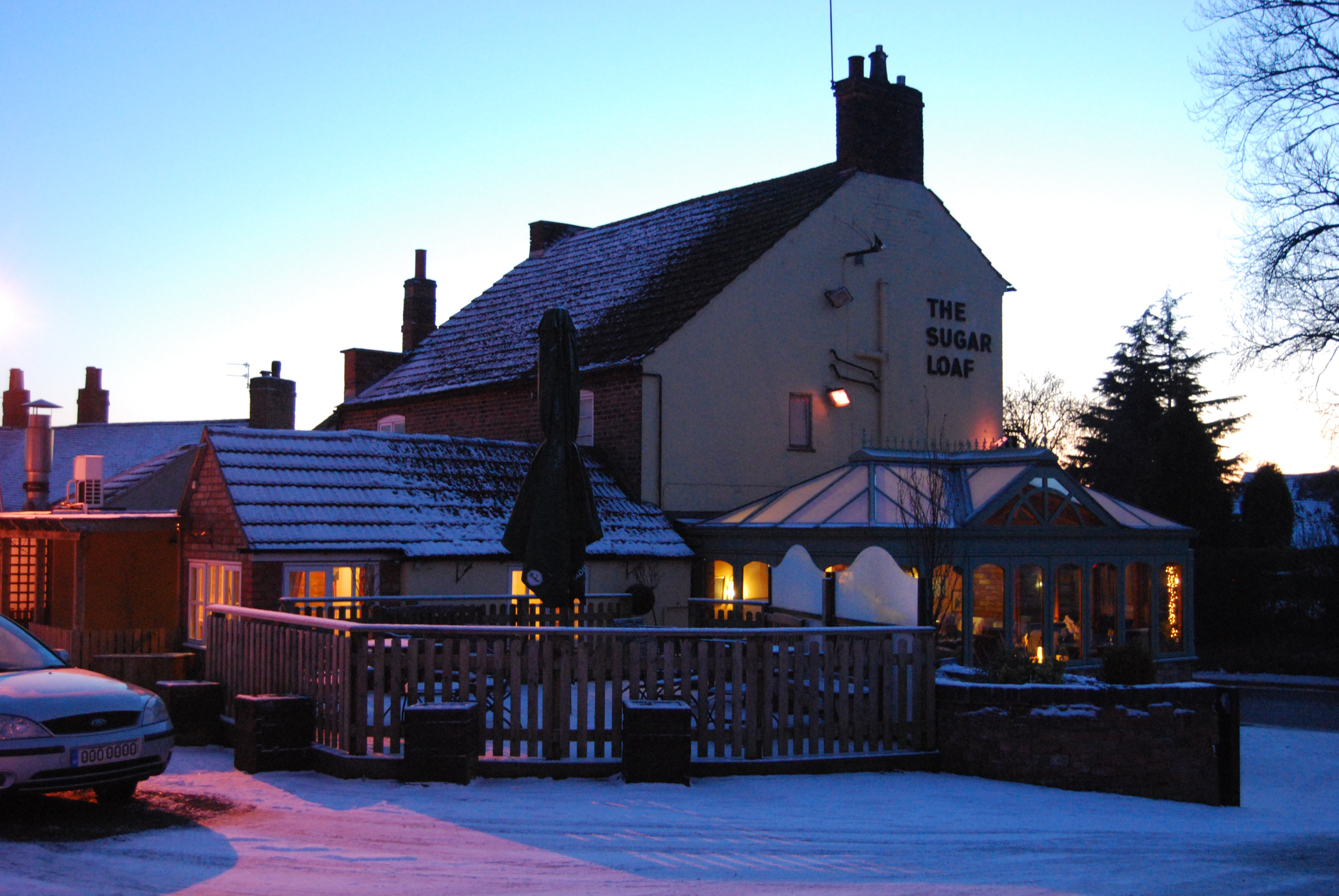
Sugar Loaf in Ab Kettleby

On the top of the hill, there are crossroads, which is highest point of the road at 171 metres, for a former Roman road (Six Hills Lane) that follows the northern ridge of the wolds, where the right turn is for Wartnaby. The road descends down a hill into Ab Kettleby, the former home of Desert Orchid, passing the Sugar Loaf on the left. The road descends down the side of a valley and up onto Potter Hill. At this point the road enters the parish of Melton Mowbray as Nottingham Road.

=== Melton Mowbray Bypass (Pork Pie Way) ===
Prior to 2026, the main route ran straight into Melton Mowbray town centre via Nottingham Road, before following an urban one-way system via Norman Way (A607), Thorpe End, Sherrard Street, Leicester Street, and Wilton Road.

The A606 now bypasses the town centre to the north and east along Pork Pie Way (the North and East Melton Mowbray Distributor Road). The bypass leaves the original Nottingham Road alignment at a roundabout junction near St Bartholomew's Way on the north-western edge of Melton Mowbray.

Heading eastwards and then southwards around the town, Pork Pie Way connects sequentially with the following roads via six dedicated roundabouts: 1. Scalford Road – providing access north to Scalford and south into Melton Mowbray. 2. Melton Spinney Road – for access towards Thorpe Arnold. 3. A607 Thorpe Road – connecting west to Melton town centre and east towards Waltham on the Wolds and Grantham. 4. B676 Saxby Road – leading east towards Garthorpe and Colsterworth.

South of the B676, Pork Pie Way crosses over the Birmingham to Peterborough Line railway and a realigned section of the River Eye SSSI before reaching its final roundabout junction on Burton Road (the original A606 alignment) near Burton Lazars, where the A606 rejoins its historical route towards Oakham.

=== Melton to Stamford ===
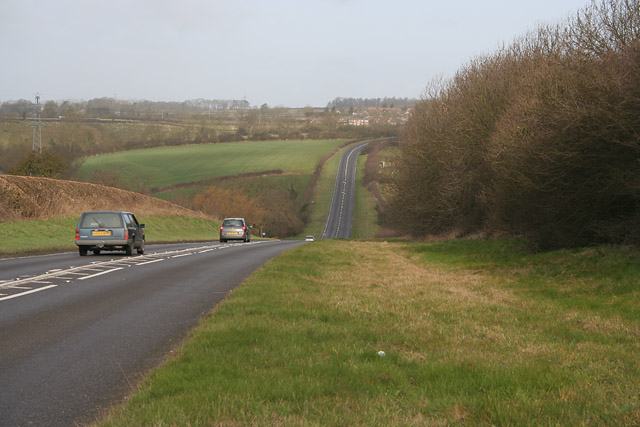
Potter Hill, north-west of Melton Mowbray

Rejoining its original alignment at Burton Road near Burton Lazars, the A606 continues southeast climbing out of the River Eye valley, passing St James church in Burton and Dalby parish, crossed by the Jubilee Way. At crossroads there is a left turn for Whissendine, and a right turn for Little Dalby. In Somerby at the top of Leesthorpe Hill, there is the Leesthorpe Crossroads, with a right turn for Leesthorpe and Pickwell. The road climbs to the top of a hill, where it becomes the boundary between Rutland (to the left) and Leicestershire (to the right), reaching 160 metres at Green's Lodge. Rutland became independent in April 1997. Leaving the Rutland boundary, the road descends to reach Whissendine Brook, and there is a left turn for Whissendine, and a right turn for Cold Overton and Northfield Farm (both in Leicestershire).

In Langham it ascends the side of Ranksborough Hill (at 191 metres, the second highest in Rutland), to reach 166 metres. Descending down the hill, it passes a right turn for Ranksborough Hall, an activity centre. In Langham, there is an abrupt turn to the left and one to the right, where it meets a road from Cold Overton. Ruddles Brewery was based here before 1997 – the year Rutland finally became independent. As Oakham Road it meets a roundabout for the bypass in Barleythorpe. The former route through Oakham is now the B640. The £11.6 million bypass opened on Wednesday 10 January 2007, with construction having started in October 2005. The contract had been awarded to Alfred McAlpine Civil Engineering in June 2003. The next roundabout is for the Lands' End clothing company. It crosses the Birmingham to Peterborough Line, and there is a roundabout for the B668 (Burley Road), close to a Midlands Co-op superstore.

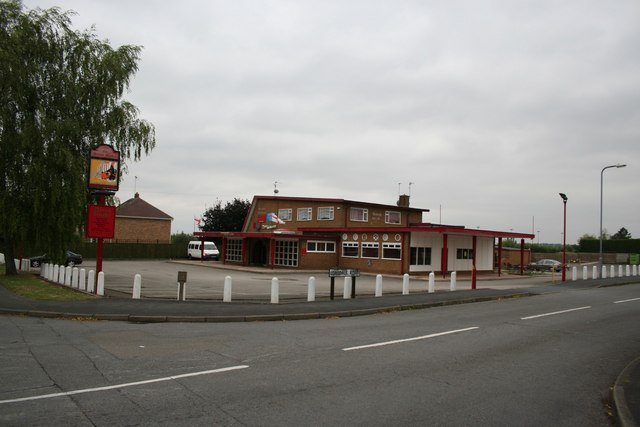
Danish Invader on Empingham Road – Stamford was one of the Five Boroughs of the Danelaw.

The bypass is crossed by the Hereward Way, and at the A6003 roundabout the A6003 leaves to the south for Uppingham, and the A606 leaves to the left (east). From here to Barnsdale, the road is followed by the Viking Way and the Macmillan Way. There is a right turn for Hambleton (and Hambleton Hall), which is the former route of the road. When Rutland Water was built, the A606 was diverted to the north. The road passes on the north shore of Rutland Water, and the southern edge of Burley Wood. In the parish of Whitwell, at Barnsdale crossroads, there is a right turn for Barnsdale Hall Hotel and Country Club, and Barnsdale Lodge. The road passes through Whitwell, where it is crossed by the Viking Way, and passes The Noel (Noel Arms). The road reaches the end of Rutland Water, the largest reservoir (by surface area) in the UK, owned by Anglian Water, and passes through Empingham, where it is crossed by the Rutland Round. It crosses the River Gwash, and is crossed by the Hereward Way. At Tinwell, it meets the A1 at an interchange built in 1960. It enters Lincolnshire, South Kesteven, and Stamford as Empingham Road losing its trunk road status, passing the Malcolm Sargent Primary School (former Exeter secondary modern school), on the left, and the Danish Invader, on the right. There is a right turn for Roman Bank (former Ermine Street) and it reaches its terminus at Scotgate – the former Great North Road (B1081).
