= Burrough on the Hill Manor =

Coordinates: 52°41′20″N 0°52′54″W

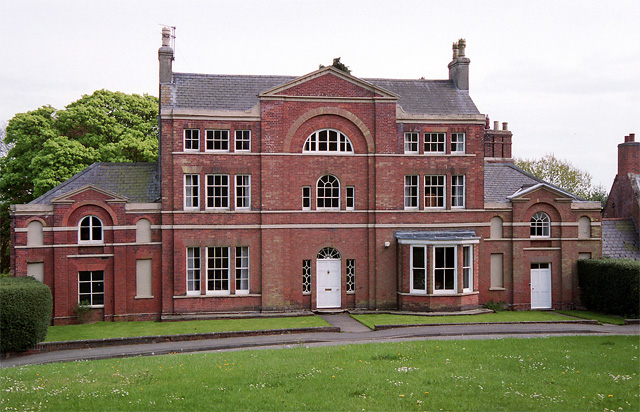
- Interactive map of the Burrough on the Hill Manor area

General information
- Type: House
- Location: Burrough on the Hill, United Kingdom
- Opened: 18th-century

Technical details
- Material: Brick

Burrough on the Hill Manor is an 18th-century brick-built house in the village of Burrough on the Hill, in the civil parish of Somerby, in the Melton district, in the county of Leicestershire, England. It is a grade II listed building.

== Notes and references ==
=== Sources ===
- Pevsner, Nikolaus (1960). The Buildings of England: Leicestershire and Rutland (Harmondsworth: Penguin Books)
