= Little Dalby =

Village in Leicestershire, England

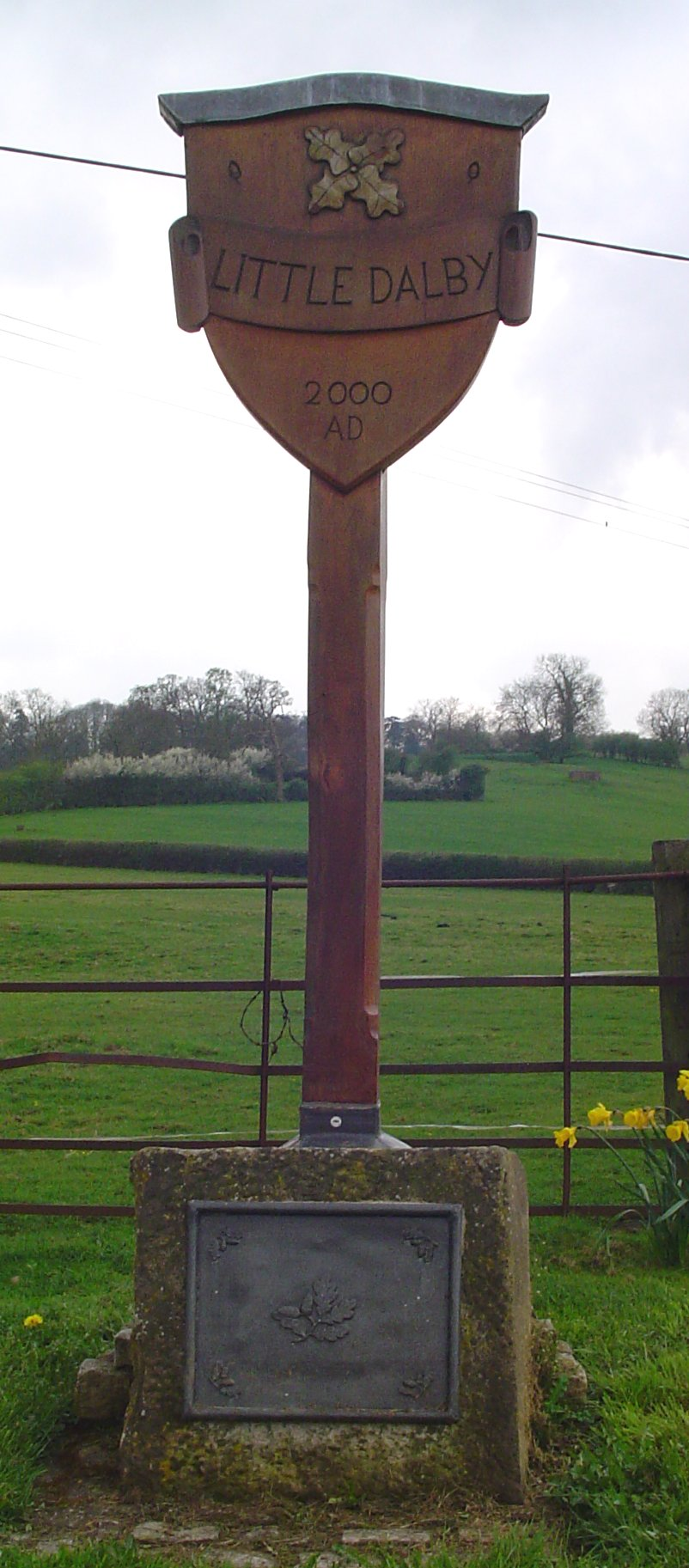
- Little Dalby village sign

- Location within Leicestershire
- Civil parish: Burton and Dalby
- District: Melton
- Shire county: Leicestershire
- Region: East Midlands
- Country: England
- Sovereign state: United Kingdom
- Post town: Melton Mowbray
- Postcode district: LE14
- Police: Leicestershire
- Fire: Leicestershire
- Ambulance: East Midlands
- UK Parliament: Melton and Syston

Little Dalby is a village and former civil parish, now in the parish of Burton and Dalby, in the Melton district, in the county of Leicestershire, England. It is 4 miles (6 km) south-east of Melton Mowbray. In 1931 the parish had a population of 118. On 1 April 1936 the parish was abolished to form "Burton and Dalby".

The Little Dalby Estate is the Ernest Cook Trust's largest and, in many ways, its most complete estate. Extending to 5,600 acres (23 km^{2}), the estate was bought in two parts by Ernest Cook, the northern half from the Burns Harttop family in 1938 and the southern half from Brasenose College in 1940. A further 480 acres (1.9 km^{2}) comprising Grange Farm, Leesthorpe, was purchased in 1977 with an additional 280 acres (1.1 km^{2}), forming Jericho Farm, in 2000. The estate includes Burrough Hill hillfort.

The parish church of St James was remodelled in 1851 by Raphael Brandon and is listed Grade II*.

Anthony Turner, one of the Jesuits wrongfully executed for treason during the fabricated Popish Plot, was born in Little Dalby, where his father Toby Turner was Rector, in 1628.
