= William Cave =

English cleric and scholar (1637–1713)

- Born: 30 December 1637; Pickwell, Leicestershire
- Died: 4 August 1713 (aged 75); Windsor
- Education: Oakham School, St John's College, Cambridge
- Spouse: Anna Stonehouse
- Children: four sons, two daughters
- Parent: John Cave
- Church: Church of England
- Congregations served: Islington, All-Hallows the Great, Isleworth
- Offices held: Chaplain to Charles II, Canon of Windsor

William Cave (30 December 1637 – 4 August 1713) was an English divine and patristic scholar.

== Life ==
Cave was born at Pickwell, Leicestershire, of which parish his father, John Cave was vicar. He was educated at Oakham School and St John's College, Cambridge. He took his B.A. degree in 1656, his M.A. in 1660, his DD in 1672, and in 1681 he was incorporated DD at Oxford. He was vicar of St Mary's, Islington (1662–91), rector of All-Hallows the Great, Upper Thames Street, London (1679–89), and in 1690 became vicar of Isleworth in Middlesex, at that time a quiet place which suited his studious temper. Cave was also chaplain to Charles II, and in 1684 became a canon of Windsor, where he died. He was buried at St Mary's, Islington, near his wife and children.

== Works ==
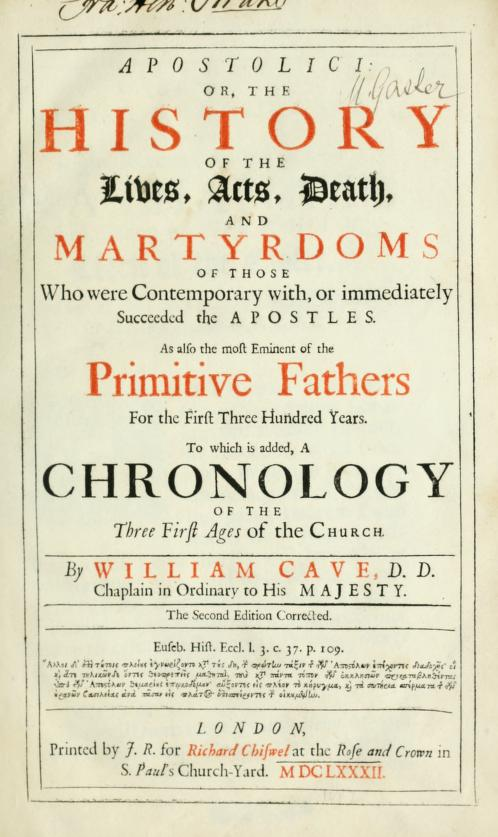
Apostolici, 2d ed. (1682)

The merits of Cave as a writer consist in the thoroughness of his research, the clearness of his style, and, above all, the lucid method of his arrangement. The two works on which his reputation principally rests are the Apostolici; or, The History of the Lives, Acts, Death and Martyrdoms of those who were contemporary with, or immediately succeeded the Apostles (1677), and Scriptorum Ecclesiasticorum Historia Literaria (1688).

Dowling says that the works of Cave "rank undoubtedly among those which have affected the progress of Church-history. His smaller works greatly tended to extend an acquaintance with Christian Antiquity; his Lives of the Apostles and Primitive Fathers, which may be regarded as an Ecclesiastical history of the first four centuries, is to this very day [i.e. 1838] the most learned work of the kind which has been written in our own language; and his Historia Literaria is still the best and most convenient complete work on the literary history of the Church."

Though he is sometimes criticised for not being critical with his sources, that failing means that many of his works, particularly Antiquitates Apostolicae and Apostolici contain a wealth of legendary material, culled from a wide variety of sources, much of which is not readily available elsewhere.

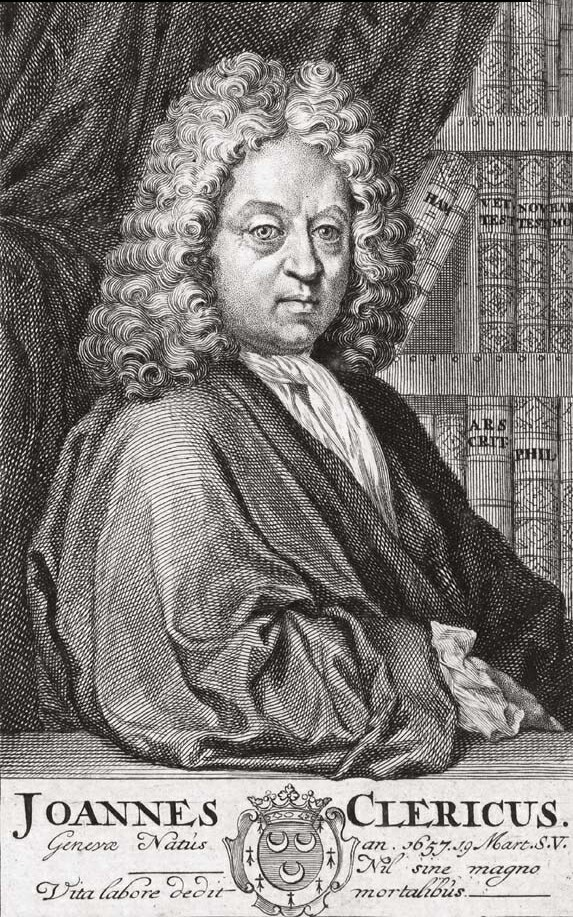
Jean Le Clerc (1657–1736)

During the course of his work he was drawn into controversy with Jean Le Clerc (1657–1736), who was then writing his Bibliothèque universelle et historique. Cave published a dissertation De Eusebii Caesariensis Arianismo adversus Johannem Clericum, criticising Le Clerc's treatment of Eusebius as an Arian, as the last of three dissertations appended to the second part of his Historia Literaria (London 1698). Le Clerc replied in a work entitled Epistolae Criticae et Ecclesiasticae, which formed the third volume of the second edition of his Ars Critica (Amsterdam, 1700); reprinted (Leiden, 1778). Le Clerc said, that Cave, in his Historia Literaria, had concealed many things about the fathers, for the sake of enhancing their credit, which an impartial historian should have related; and that, instead of lives of the fathers, he often wrote panegyrics upon them. Cave responded the same year with his Epistola Apologetica (London, 1700). This was reprinted at the end of the second volume of the Historia Literaria, in the edition published at Oxford in 1743.

Cave is said to have been "of a learned and communicative conversation;" he is also reported to have been "a florid and eloquent preacher," and the printed sermons he has left behind bear out this character.

- Primitive Christianity: or, the Religion of the ancient Christians in the first Ages of the Gospel, 2 volumes, 1672. It was dedicated to Nathaniel Crewe, lord bishop of Oxford. Reprinted many times: Vol. 1 (London, 1839) and Vol. 2 (London, 1839).
- Tabulae Ecclesiasticae [Tables of Ecclesiastical Writers], 1674
- Antiquitates Apostolicae: or, The History of the Lives, Acts, and Martyrdoms of the Holy Apostles of our Saviour and the two Evangelists, St. Mark and St. Luke, 1675. Originally published as the second part of Jeremy Taylor's Antiquitates christianae. Reprinted many times: Vo1. 1 (London, 1834) and Vol. 2 (London, 1834).
- Apostolici: or, the history of the lives, acts, death and martyrdoms of those who were contemporary with, or immediately succeeded the apostles. As also the most eminent of the primitive fathers for the first three hundred years, 1677; 2nd ed. (London, 1682). Reprinted in later years as Lives of the most eminent Fathers of the Church that flourished in the first four centuries, Vol. 1 (Oxford, 1840),
- A Dissertation concerning the Government of the Ancient Church by Bishops, Metropolitans and Patriarchs 1683
- Ecclesiastici: or, the History of the lives, acts, death and writings of the most eminent Fathers of the Church, 1683. Reprinted in later years as Lives of the most eminent Fathers of the Church that flourished in the first four centuries, Vol. 2 (Oxford, 1840) and Vol. 3 (Oxford, 1840).
- Scriptorum Ecclesiasticorum Historia Literaria a Christo nato usque ad saeculum XIV, a literary history of ecclesiastical writers, in two parts, the first part published (London, 1688), the second (London, 1698). Reprinted several times. The edition that appeared in (Geneva, 1705), was printed without the author's knowledge, reprinted (Geneva, 1720). This 1705 printing is said to have caused the author great loss, and to have so disgusted him that he would not issue a second edition; but he spent much time during the later years of his life in revising repeatedly this great work. He made alterations and additions equal to one-third of the whole work, and wrote new prolegomena. It was finally printed in two folio volumes, with some additional matter from Henry Wharton, edited by Daniel Waterland, the first (Oxford, 1740), the second (Oxford, 1743). It is regarded by all as being the best edition.
- Sermons: A Sermon before the King at Whitehall, 23 January 1675 (London, 1676); A Sermon before the Lord Mayor at St. Mary-le-Bow, 5 November 1680 (London, 1680); A Sermon before the King at Whitehall, 18 January 1684 (London, 1685).

● " Kerkelyke oudheden of beschryving van het leven, bedryf, dood, en schriften der voornaamste" is about the life and the works of IV century theologians (printed in 1698 by François Halma and Willem vande Water).

== Bibliography ==
- Overton, John Henry (1887). "Cave, William" . In Stephen, Leslie (ed.). Dictionary of National Biography. Vol. 9. London: Smith, Elder & Co.
- Allibone, S. A. (1872). "A Critical Dictionary of English Literature and British and American Authors". Philadelphia: J. B. Lippincott.
- Chalmers, A. (1813). The General Biographical Dictionary. Vol. 9. London: Rivington, et al.
- Cunningham, G. G. (1837). Lives of Eminent and Illustrious Englishmen. Vol. 4. Glasgow: A. Fullarton & Co.
- Darling, J. (1854). Cyclopaedia bibliographica, vol. 1, pp. 605–607. London: James Darling.
- Dowling, J. G. (1838). An Introduction to the Critical Study of Ecclesiastical History. London: Rivington. p. 159. ISBN 9780790544052.
- Hook, W. F. (1847). An Ecclesiastical Biography. Vol. 3. London: Rivington.
- Jackson, S. M. (1908). The New Schaff-Herzog Encyclopedia of Religious Knowledge. Vol. 2. New York: Funk & Wagnalls.
- McClintock, J. (1868). Cyclopaedia of Biblical, Theological, and Ecclesiastical Literature. Vol. 2. New York: Harper & Brothers.
- Owen, W. (1784). 'A New and General Biographical Dictionary. Vol. 3. London: Rivington, et al.
