= E2 European long distance path =

Walking path in Europe

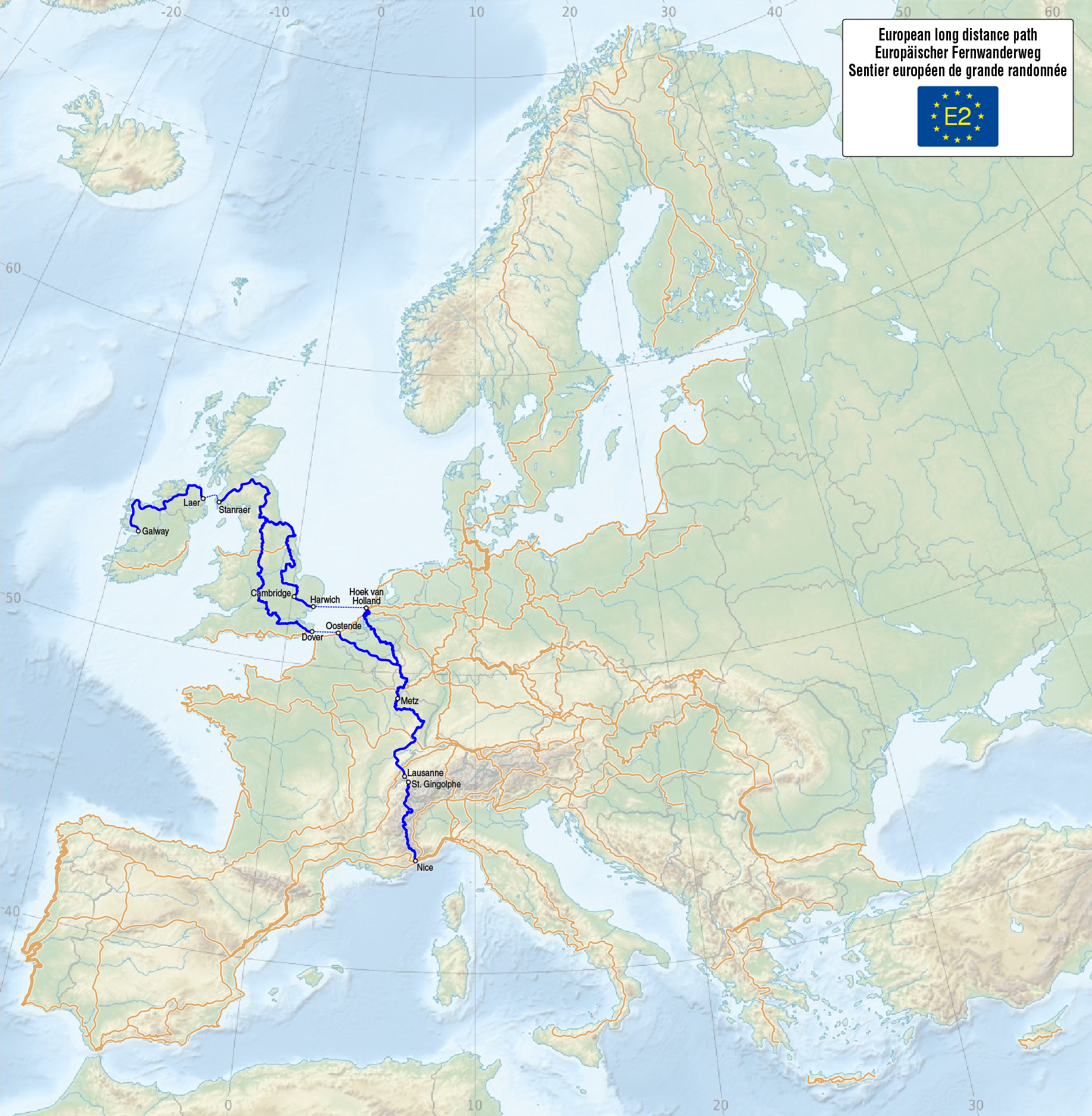
The European walking route E2

The E2 European long distance path or E2 path is a 4850 km (3010-mile) series of long-distance footpaths that is intended to run from Galway in Ireland to France's Mediterranean coast and currently runs through Scotland, England, Belgium, Luxembourg and France, with an alternative mid-section equally designated via the Netherlands and east coast of England and (since 2025) an alternative starting point at John o'Groats in Scotland. It is one of the network of European long-distance paths.

The paths are aimed at walkers; alternative routes exist in some parts for horse riders and cyclists.

== Route ==
The route has two alternative midsections, reuniting in north-east England and northern Belgium: the first devised route includes Oxford, Reading, Bruges and Antwerp and does not include the southern part of the Dutch coast. The corollary midsection, listed as the alternative route, includes Hull, Lincoln, Cambridge and Bergen op Zoom.

In Belgium the route starts from Ostend on the GR5A (Grote Route 5A) via Bruges and Antwerp. For the convenience of ferries there is an alternative starting point at Calais, France. After a few kilometres in the mid-northern municipality (district) of Zoersel in Belgium it joins the GR 5 (Grande Randonnée 5), which continues to Luxembourg at Ouren. In Luxembourg the E2 follows a series of paths to Schengen after which it joins the GR5 in France. At La Cure a short section in Switzerland begins, where the route is signposted to Nyon, or La Cure if heading north. From Nyon ferries cross Lake Geneva to St Gingolph where the GR5 forms the remainder of the route through the French Alps to finish at Nice.

The highest point of the route is at Col de l'Iseran at 2,770 metres (9,090 ft).

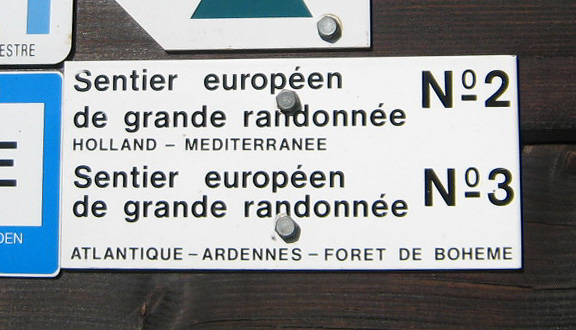
Sign on the path of the E2 near Vianden, Luxembourg

== Ireland ==
The Irish section of the route is not yet open.

== United Kingdom ==
In Scotland the route starts from Stranraer and follows the Southern Upland Way, to Melrose and St. Cuthbert's Way, from Melrose to Kirk Yetholm, and on to the Anglo-Scottish border via the Pennine Way. An alternative route to Melrose has also been developed starting at John o'Groats, following the John o'Groats Trail, Great Glen Way, West Highland Way, John Muir Way, Water of Leith Walkway, Pentland Way and Cross Borders Drove Road.

In England the western route continues on the Pennine Way from the border to Standedge, the Oldham Way from Standedge to Mossley, the Tameside Trail from Mossley to Broadbottom, the Etherow/Goyt Valley Way from Broadbottom to Compstall, the Goyt Way from Compstall to Disley, the Peak Forest Canal from Disley to Marple, the Gritstone Trail from Disley to Rushton Spencer, the Staffordshire Way from Rushton Spencer to Cannock Chase, the Heart of England Way from Cannock Chase to Bourton on the Water, the Oxfordshire Way from Bourton on the Water to Kirtlington, the Oxford Canal from Kirtlington to Oxford, the Thames Path from Oxford to Weybridge, the Wey Navigation Path from Weybridge to Guildford, and the North Downs Way from Guildford to Dover.

In England, the alternative midsection begins on the Pennine Way at Middleton-in-Teesdale. It then follows the Teesdale Way, the Cleveland Way, the Yorkshire Wolds Way, the Viking Way, the Hereward Way, the Fen Rivers Way, the Icknield Way Path, the Stour Valley Path and the Essex Way to Harwich International Port. Urban highlights are Lincoln and Cambridge.

== Netherlands ==
In the Netherlands the eastern route begins at the ferry port of Hook of Holland (where ferries from Harwich International Port arrive) and passes over islands and dams and through Bergen op Zoom on the LAW 5-1 Nederlands Kustpad. This corollary section picks up the main route at Sint Antonius, Zoersel in northern Belgium.

== Luxembourg ==
In Luxembourg the E2 follows four paths: Sentier de l’ Our, Sentier Maurice Cosyn, Sentier de la Basse Sûr and Sentier de la Moselle. Apart from the Sentier Maurice Cosyn, they all follow river valleys. Unlike the GR5 and LAW 5-1 which are waymarked by red and white stripes, the paths in Luxembourg are marked with yellow circles in the north and yellow rectangles in the south.
