= Great Dalby =

Village in Leicestershire, England

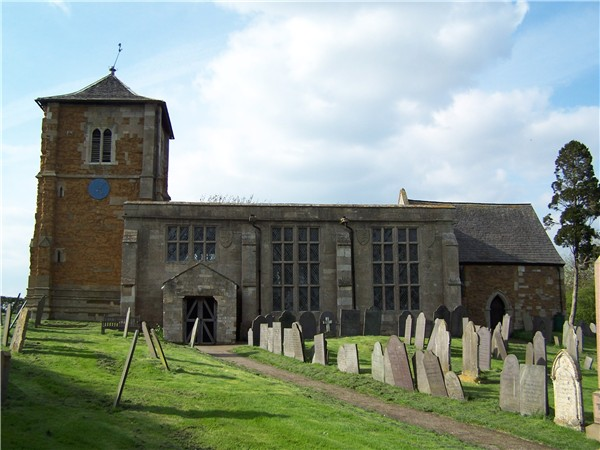
- St Swithun Parish Church, Great Dalby

- Location within Leicestershire
- Civil parish: Burton and Dalby
- District: Melton
- Shire county: Leicestershire
- Region: East Midlands
- Country: England
- Sovereign state: United Kingdom
- Post town: Melton Mowbray
- Postcode district: LE14
- Police: Leicestershire
- Fire: Leicestershire
- Ambulance: East Midlands
- UK Parliament: Melton and Syston

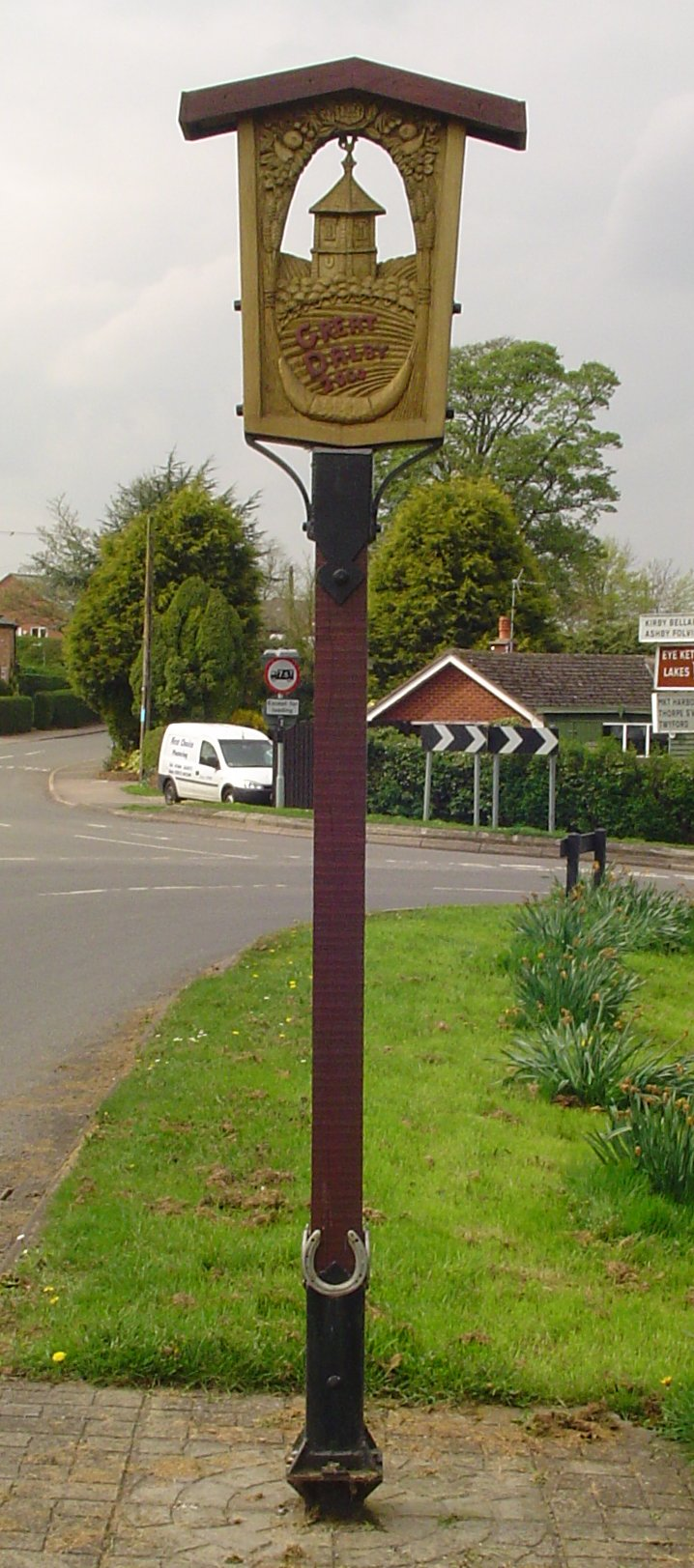
Signpost in Great Dalby

Great Dalby is a village and former civil parish, now in the parish of Burton and Dalby, in the Melton district, in the county of Leicestershire, England, with a population of between 300 and 400. It is referred to in some UK census records as Dalby Magna. It is 3 miles south of Melton Mowbray.

== History ==
The parish church of St. Swithun was originally built during the 13th century and renovated several times since then. It is a Grade II* listed building. The village's name derives from the Old Norse dalr-by meaning 'farm/settlement in a valley'. Several villages in Denmark are also called Dalby.

In 1931 the parish had a population of 323. On 1 April 1936 the parish was abolished and to form "Burton and Dalby".
