= Viking Way =

147 mile footpath in England

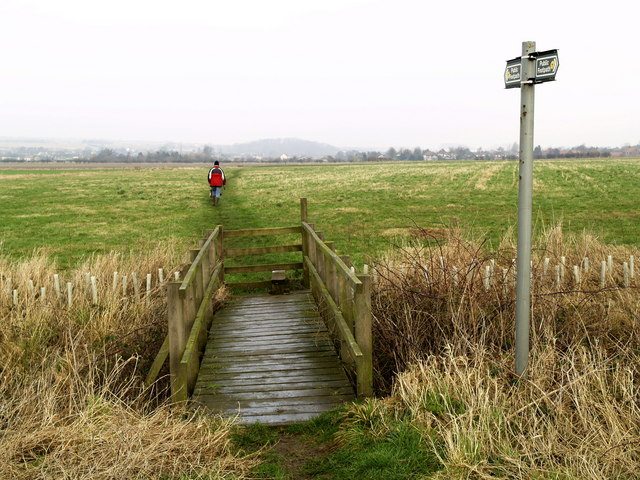
- Length: 147 mi (237 km)
- Location: Lincolnshire, England
- Trailheads: Barton-upon-Humber Lincolnshire; 53.6974°N 0.4444°W and Oakham, Rutland; 52.6688°N 0.7250°W
- Use: Hiking
- Elevation change: 161 m (528 ft)
- Highest point: Sewstern Leicestershire, 52°46′53″N 0°41′09″W, 164 m (538 ft)
- Lowest point: Bardney Lincolnshire, 53°11′54″N 0°18′56″W, 3 m (9.8 ft)
- Difficulty: Easy
- Season: All year
- Sights: Humber Bridge; South Ferriby; Bardney Abbey; Lincoln Cathedral; Rutland Water

The Viking Way is a long-distance trail in England, running 147 miles (237 km) between the Humber Bridge in North Lincolnshire and Oakham in Rutland.

== History ==
The route was officially opened on 5 September 1976 at Tealby, by the Deputy Chairman of Lincolnshire County Council; it was to be opened by the Chairman of the council, John Hedley Lewis, but he was ill and died in December. Hedley Lewis was President of the county Ramblers' Association, and a memorial stile was made for him in 1978 on the route at Stenwith, a half-mile north of the Rutland Arms in Woolsthorpe-by-Belvoir.

The Countryside Commission recognised the significance of the Viking Way as a high-quality long-distance walk linking other major routes in Eastern England, these being the Yorkshire Wolds Way at the northern end, the Hereward Way and Macmillan Way from Oakham and indirectly via the Hereward Way, the Jurassic Way from Stamford and the southern end of the Peddars Way from Thetford. Most of the route is designated as part of the European long-distance path E2.

Many prehistoric settlements were established on dry ground in the Lincolnshire Wolds and on the Limestone Heath. The route passes sites of early settlements. There is evidence that the Vikings exercised influence over the county (Danelaw) in the 9th century: e.g. the place names ending in -by, Scandinavian names recorded in documents and also names marked on coins. Much of the Viking Way is classified as a Byway Open to All Traffic (BOAT) and is thus a vehicular right of way.

== Route ==
=== North Lincolnshire ===
The walk passes under the Humber Bridge, then follows the escarpment of the Ancholme Valley over the M180 at the A15 roundabout (Barnetby Top). This section was part of Humberside until April 1996.

=== Lincolnshire ===
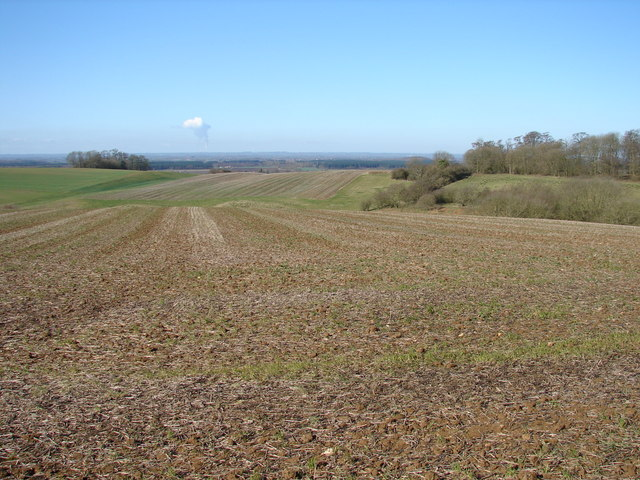
View towards Market Rasen from south of Tealby

It follows the Lincolnshire Wolds over the AONB through Caistor, crossing the A46, and Horncastle, crossing the A158. It follows the River Bain into Woodhall Spa along a former railway, now the Spa Trail. It heads north-west through Stixwould, Southrey, Bardney, Stainfield, before reaching Fiskerton where it follows the south side of the River Witham towards Lincoln due west. It used to run alongside the river on Waterside South and then down Canwick Road, but was diverted in around 2002 to take a detour near Washingborough over the river.

From here it crosses the Lincoln–Grimsby railway, then enters Lincoln on Crofton Road then skirts the south side of Lincoln County Hospital, follows Lindum Terrace and crosses the A15. It passes Pottergate and enters the grounds of Lincoln Cathedral, passing the south side on Minster Yard. It heads down Steep Hill and follows the main shopping High Street of Lincoln, over the River Witham and crosses the railway at a level crossing. It follows Tentercroft Street then continues along Sincil Bank towards the football ground. It heads along Scorer Street towards South Park, and meets the old route on Canwick Road (B1188). It then runs along the southern edge of the South Common, which also forms the boundary between the borough of Lincoln and North Kesteven and crosses the A15 on the North Kesteven boundary.

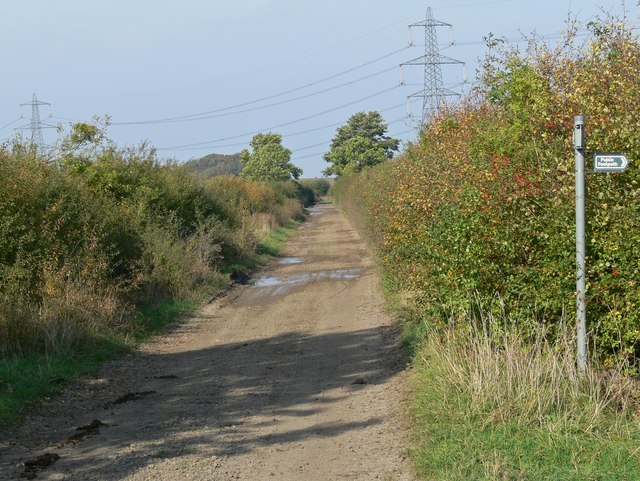
Sewstern Lane west of Allington

It runs parallel to the A607 to the west of Bracebridge Heath and through Waddington, Harmston, Coleby, Boothby Graffoe, Navenby and Wellingore along the Lincoln Cliff, then follows the old Ermine Street, crossing the A607. Near High Dyke Farm, just north of the A17 it meets the boundary of South Kesteven and North Kesteven, west of RAF Cranwell. At Byard's Leap it crosses the A17 and follows the B6403 towards Ancaster along the South Kesteven boundary (which continues to just north of Ancaster). It heads west and enters South Kesteven. It meets the A607 again at Carlton Scroop, then crosses the River Witham and passes through Marston and Long Bennington. It was extended to Long Bennington in 1997 to allow walkers to cross the A1 on a road bridge, as previously they were obliged to cross the road directly, near Foston. It no longer goes through Allington, and crosses the A52 near Sedgebrook and a level crossing over the Nottingham to Grantham Line. It then follows what used to be called Sewstern Lane and meets the Lincolnshire–Leicestershire boundary near Harston which it follows and crosses the A607.

=== Leicestershire ===
It passes Saltby Airfield (former RAF Saltby) and Buckminster, then goes through Sewstern where it briefly enters Leicestershire and the borough of Melton.

=== Rutland ===
It rejoins the Lincolnshire boundary near to the source of the River Witham then enters Rutland and Thistleton. It passes close to the former RAF Cottesmore (now Kendrew Barracks) and goes through Greetham and Exton. It meets the A606 and Hereward Way at Whitwell, then passes through the two watersports centres on Rutland Water at Whitwell and Barnsdale. From here it follows the A606 from Barnsdale Hill into Oakham. When the route was opened, it followed main roads from Exton to Oakham; the facilities at Whitwell and Barnsdale had not then been developed.

== See also ==
- Humber Bridge
- Lincolnshire Wolds AONB
- National Trails
- Long-distance footpaths in the UK
- European Walking Route E2

== Gallery ==
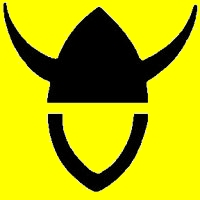
The Viking Way Marker

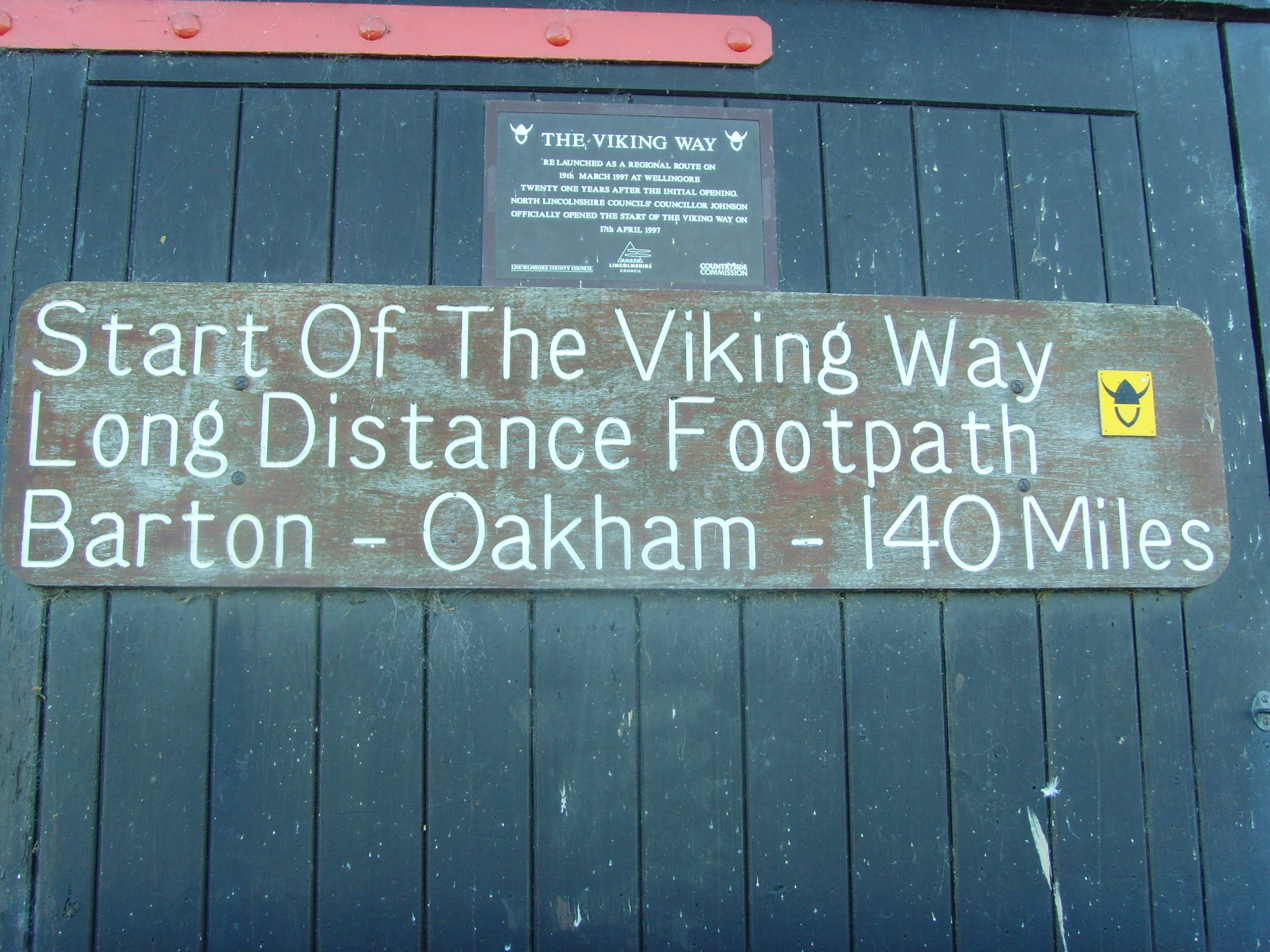
The start of the walk at the old Coastguard Station

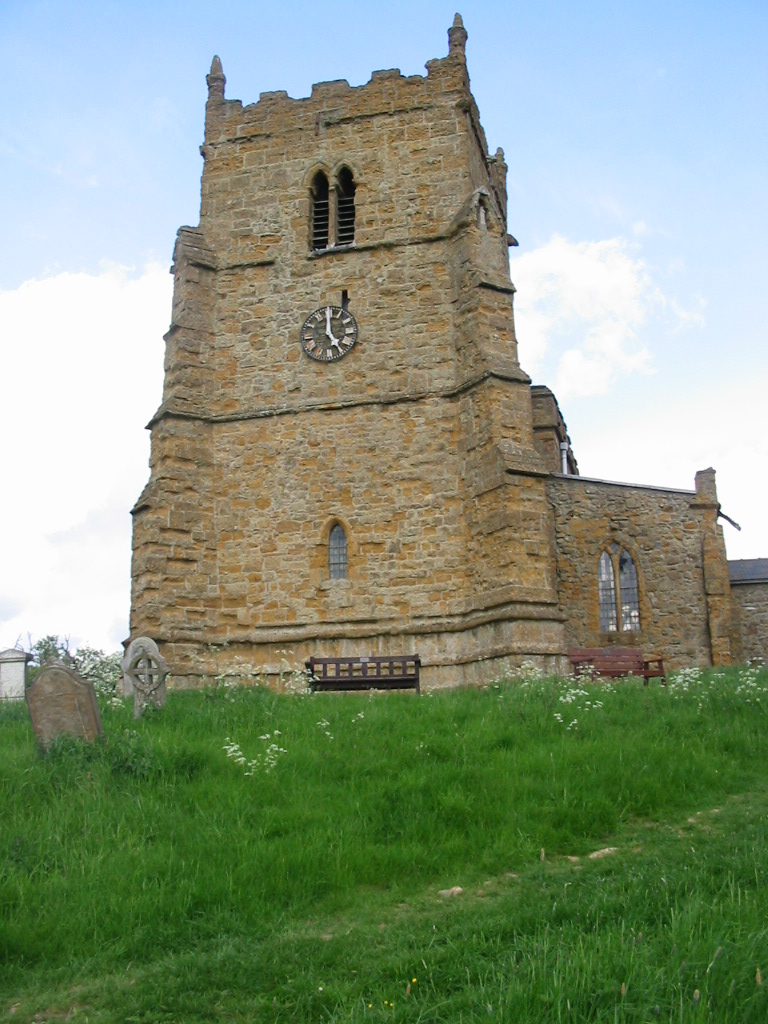
The Ramblers Church, Walesby, located on the trail, has a long association with walkers.

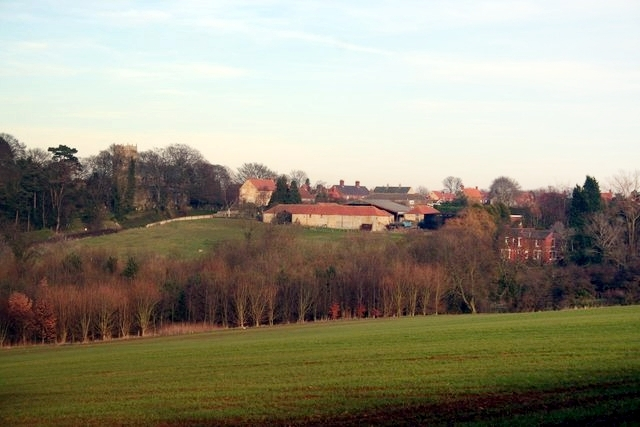
Navenby from The Viking Way
