= Burrough Hill =

Iron Age hill fort in Leicestershire, England

- Burrough on the Hill, Leicestershire
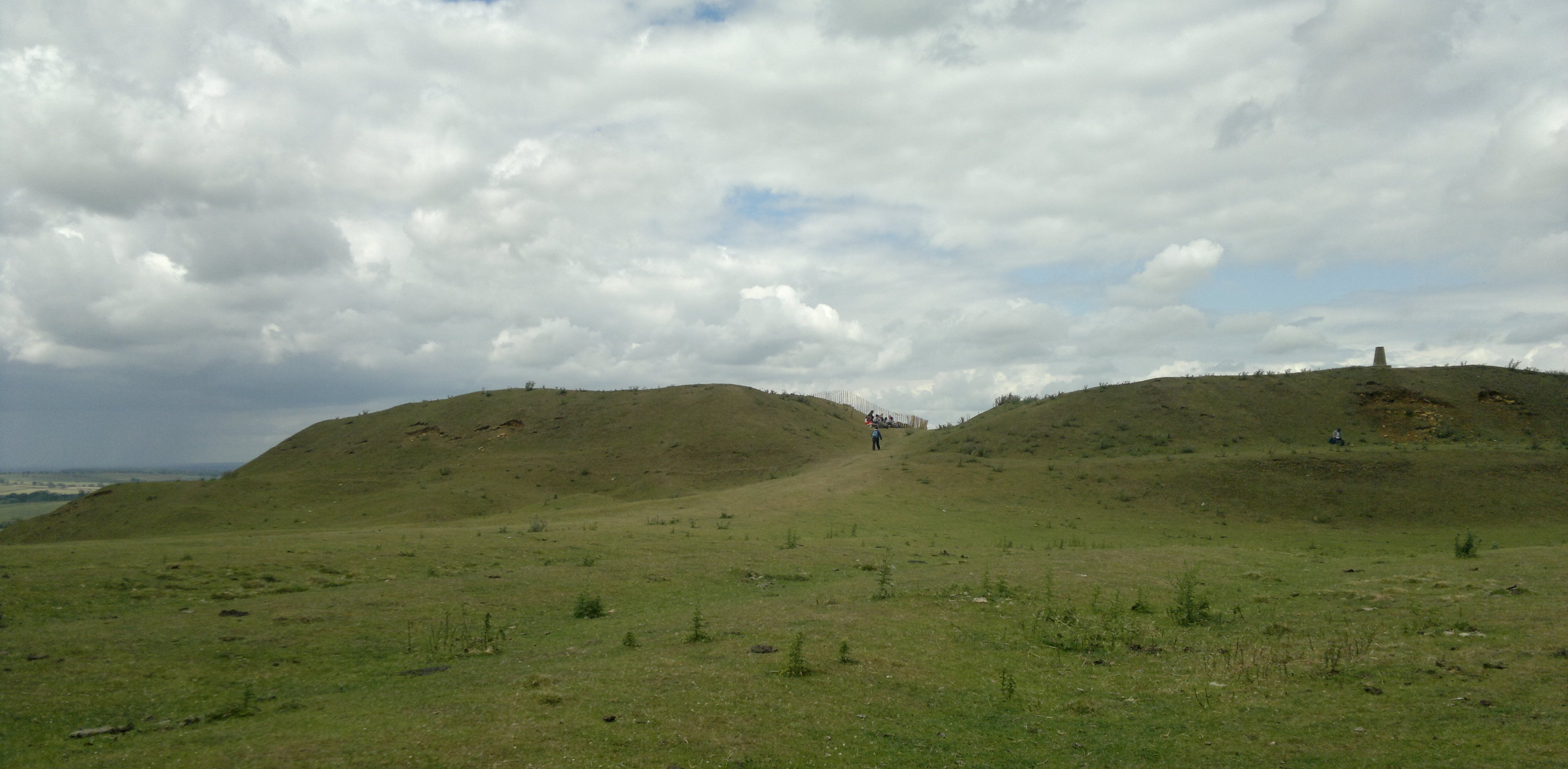
- The main entrance to the hillfort

Site information
- Type: Iron Age hillfort
- Owner: Ernest Cook Trust
- Controlled by: English Heritage
- Condition: Earthwork remains

Location
- Location within Leicestershire
- Coordinates: 52°41′59″N 0°52′32″W grid reference SK76081193

Burrough Hill is an Iron Age hillfort in Burrough on the Hill, 7 miles (11 km) south of Melton Mowbray in the English county of Leicestershire. Situated on a promontory about 210 metres (690 ft) above sea level, the site commands views over the surrounding countryside for miles around. There has been human activity in the area since at least the Mesolithic, and the hillfort was founded in the early Iron Age. In the medieval period, after the hillfort was abandoned, the hill was used as farmland. This ended in the 17th century when the parish the hill was in was enclosed. Traces of ridge and furrow show where the medieval fields were ploughed. Since the 1930s the site has been the subject of archaeological investigations and renewed excavations under the auspices of the University of Leicester began in 2010. Part of Burrough Hill Country Park and open to the public, the hillfort is protected as a Scheduled Ancient Monument.

According to archaeologist Dr Jeremy Taylor "sites like Burrough Hill were the nearest thing we have to a town before places like Leicester ever existed".

== Location and layout ==
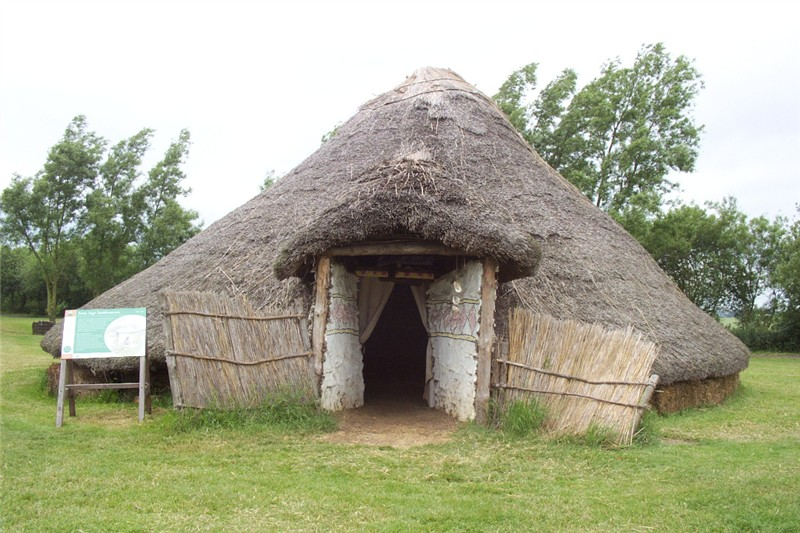
A reconstructed roundhouse at Flag Fen near Peterborough may represent how the roundhouses at Burrough Hill appeared.

The hillfort stands on an ironstone promontory around 660 feet (200 m) above sea level, 7 miles (11 km) south of the modern settlement of Melton Mowbray. shaped during prehistoric ice ages. The bedrock is marlstone, limestone containing iron. Although the rock contains iron, the levels are low and little attempt was made to extract it. The iron gives the limestone a distinctive hue, ranging from orange to light brown as the proportion of iron changes across the site. Surrounded by a single ditch and rampart, the hillfort is trapezoidal in shape and covers an area of around 12 acres (4.8 ha). The ramparts, constructed from stone and earth, stand 9.8 ft (3 m) above the interior of the hillfort and would originally have been higher. There is also a counterscarp 16 to 20 feet (5 to 6 m) beyond the northern rampart.

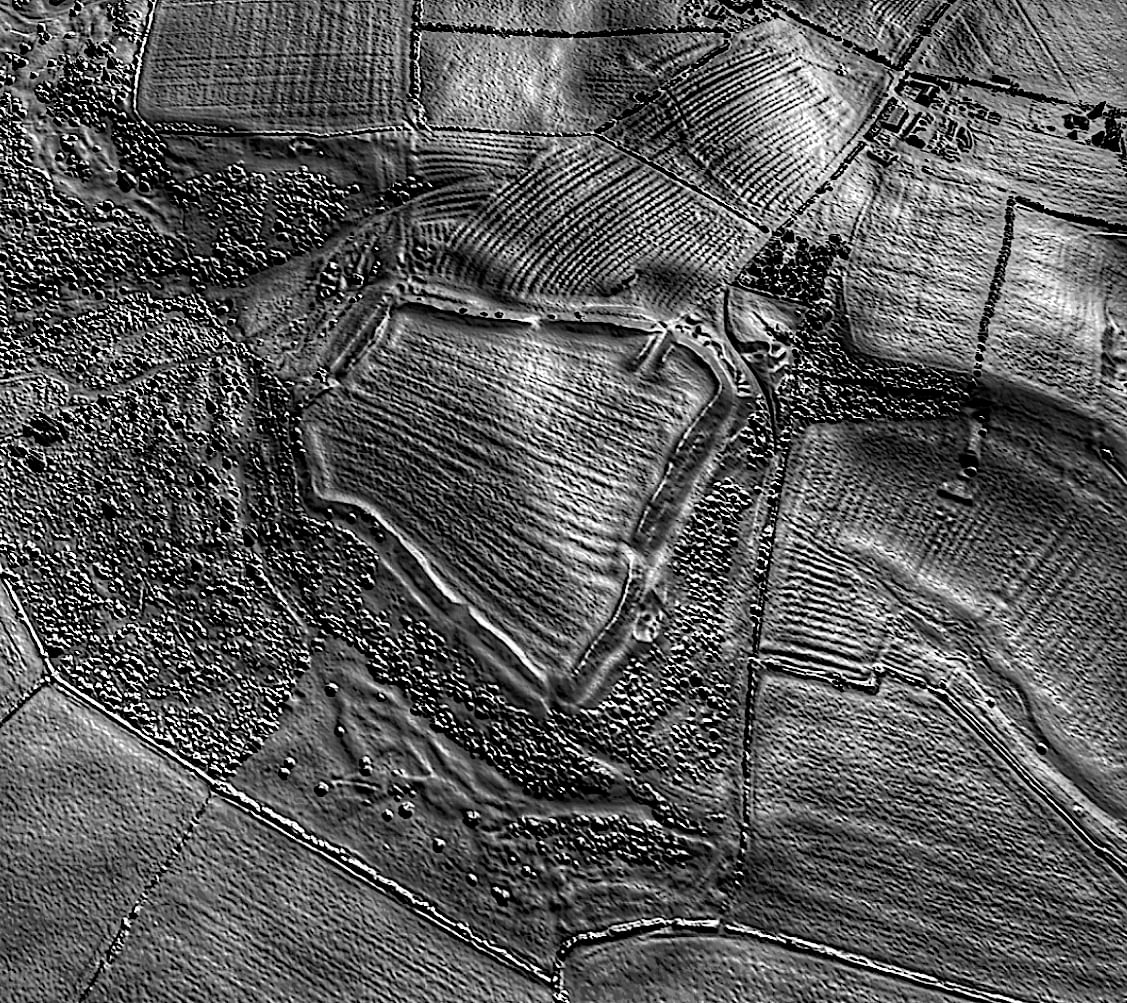
A lidar view of the hillfort.

The hillfort was entered from the south-east via a gap in the ramparts turned inwards. The gatepassage extends for 148 feet (45 m) into the fort and is flanked by 6 feet 7 inches (2 m) high banks, although they were probably much higher when they were originally built. The passage would have been faced with stone. A chamber, possibly a guardhouse, 16 by 33 feet (5 by 10 m) was built into the banks. Timber posts indicate there may have been a wooden gallery above the entrance, allowing people to cross the ramparts next to the entrance. The design, with an extended gatepassage and an adjacent room, has parallels with hillforts to the north such as Eddisbury in Cheshire and The Wrekin in Shropshire. An extended entrance, as seen at Burrough Hill, was a common theme in hillfort design and served to increase the time it took to enter. There may have been a second entrance in the south-west of the site. Later activity on the site has caused breaks in the ramparts, but the remains generally survive well.

A magnetometry survey of the interior of the hillfort in 2010 revealed over 400 circular anomalies of uncertain purpose (maculae) distributed across the fort, although there were fewer around the south-east. Their size and number, as well as finds from similar features in previous excavations, suggests they may have been storage pits. The survey also discovered curved features that probably indicate the presence of roundhouses. They were grouped close to the ramparts on the north, west, and south sides. There are signs of post-medieval quarrying outside the main entrance to the fort. Outside the hillfort were more curved anomalies, suggesting roundhouses in a settlement beyond the ramparts. It was surrounded by a ditch.

== History ==
Burrough Hill is the best example of a univallate hillfort (surrounded by a single ditch and rampart) in Leicestershire. Finds from the site date from as early as the Mesolithic, indicating the area has seen human activity over an extended period of time, however it is likely that a settlement was only created in the Late Bronze or Early Iron Age. The subsequent development of the hillfort is unclear. As yet it is uncertain whether the settlement outside the hillfort was contemporary with the occupation of the hillfort or represent a different phase of activity on the site. The period of most intensive activity at Burrough Hill was between 100 BC and AD 50. Artefacts indicate that the settlement had a wide range of trade links. Towards the end of the Iron Age, the fort gradually degraded. A layer of refuse bears testament to this and contains Roman pottery. It is likely the site was still in use between the 1st and 4th centuries AD, at which point Britain was under Roman control. During the Roman period, habitation was focused in the northern part of the fort.

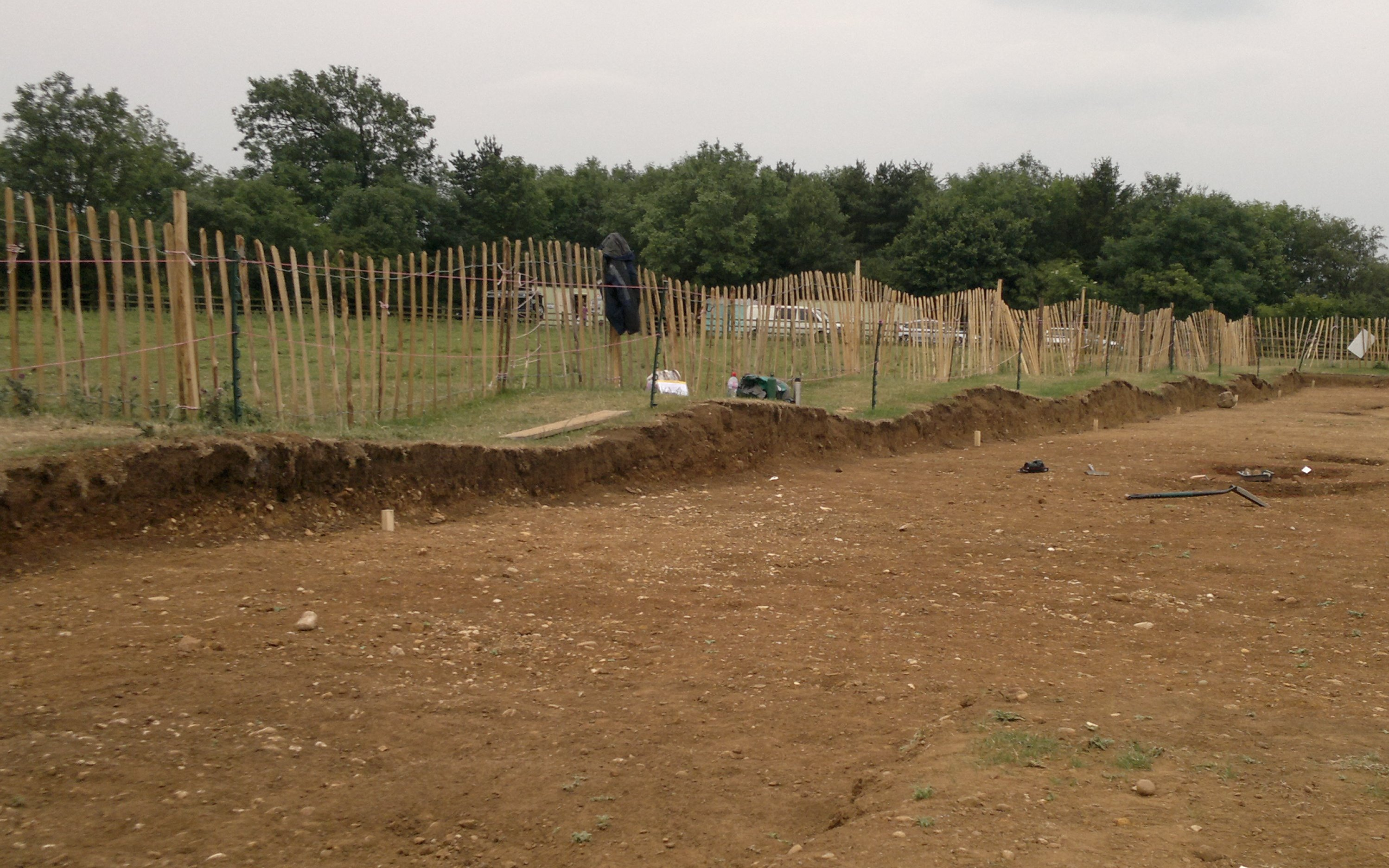
Medieval ridge and furrow cut through by archaeological excavations. The soil is orange/brown.

In the medieval period, the interior of the hillfort along with the surrounding area was farmed; traces of ridge and furrow still mark where the fields were ploughed. As well as being used agriculturally, locals used the hill to hold a fair. According to 16th-century antiquarian John Leland, on Whit Mondays the hill was used for social events such as dancing and games. In his Itinerary, Leland noted that curiosity prompted him to excavate some of the earthworks near the entrance and his account may be regarded as the earliest archaeological field report. The hill was used as farmland until the 17th century when the parish was enclosed. In the 19th century, Burrough Hill was used by the Melton Hunt for steeple-chasing.

The first professional archaeological excavation on Burrough Hill was in 1935; it was not well recorded, and the exact location of the trench is not certain, but it covered some 360 square feet (33 m^{2}) and was somewhere outside the east of the hillfort. Finds included animal bones and twelve pieces of Iron Age and Roman pottery. Excavations were next undertaken in 1960, by which time new technology meant non-invasive techniques such as magnetometry could be used alongside digging. About half the fort was surveyed using a proton magnetometer. Several features identified through this geophysical survey were partially excavated; they turned out to be storage pits and produced artefacts such as animal bones, quern stones for grinding, and various shards of Iron Age and Roman pottery. The entrance was also examined, and excavations revealed a cobbled surface leading into the fort as well as what may have been a guardhouse. More animal bone was found here as well as Iron Age and Roman pottery, and a brooch from the La Tène culture.

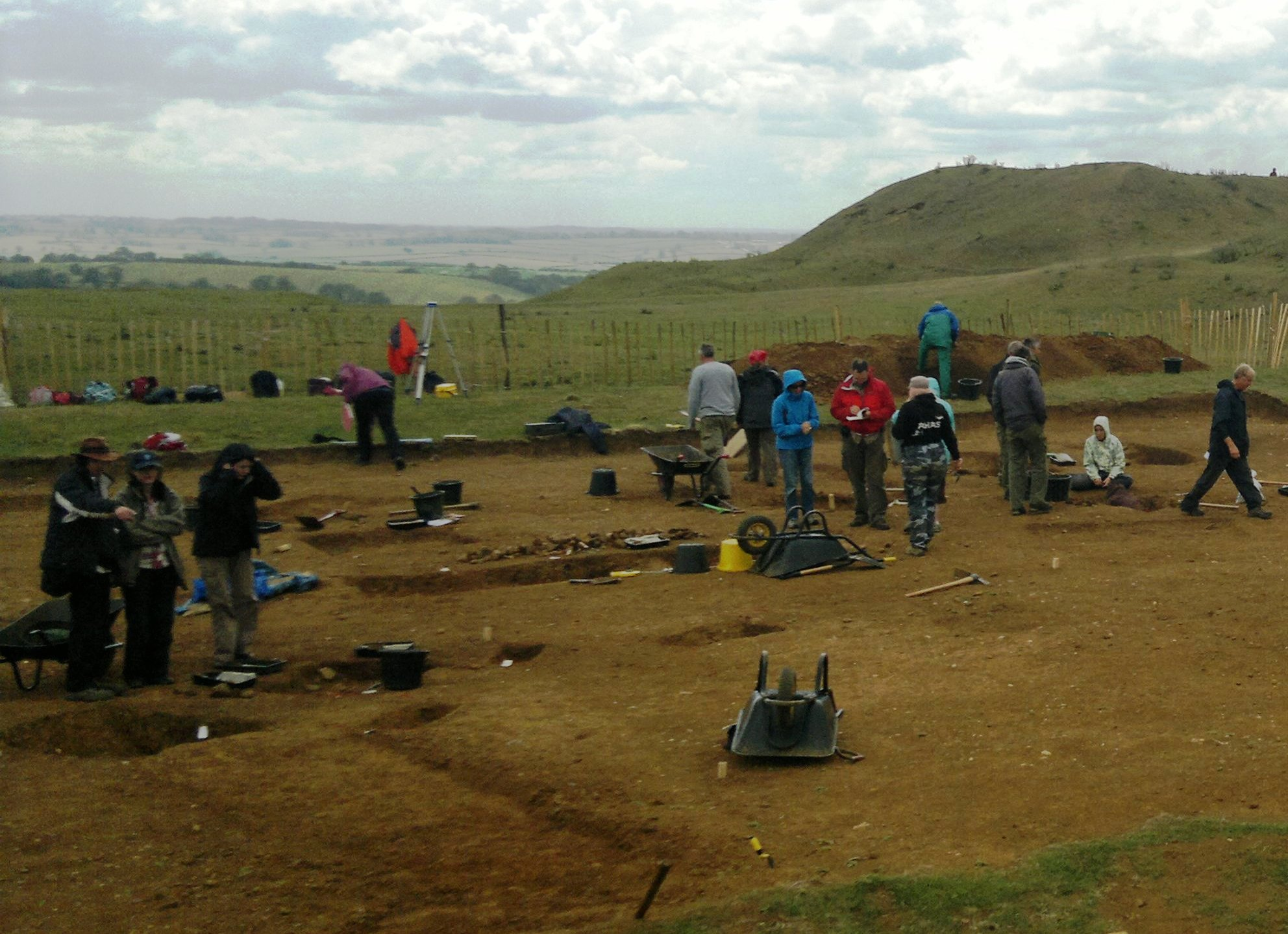
Excavations carried out by the University of Leicester in 2011

Further excavations were undertaken in 1967 when an area 50.0 by 50.0 feet (15.25 by 15.25 m) was excavated within the northern part of the hillfort with the intention of investigating pit-like features identified in the 1960 magnetometry survey. Finds from the twelve pits consisted of Iron Age and Roman pottery, animal bones, and charcoal. The layer of topsoil above the pits produced Roman pottery and some Roman coins from the 3rd and 4th centuries. The 1960 survey again guided the excavations of 1970 and 1971 when several trenches totalling an area of 680 square feet (63 m^{2}) were dug in the interior near the rampart on the north side of the site. A trench was dug across the rampart to provide a cross-section. Despite multiple excavations, the results have generally been poorly published and as a result the hillfort remains little understood.

The 86 acres (35 ha) country park containing the hillfort has been leased by the Ernest Cook Trust, who own the site, to Leicestershire County Council since 1970. The area is still used as farmland, mostly for crops but with some livestock such as cows and sheep. Burrough Hill Country Park, which contains the hillfort, is open to the public in daylight hours.

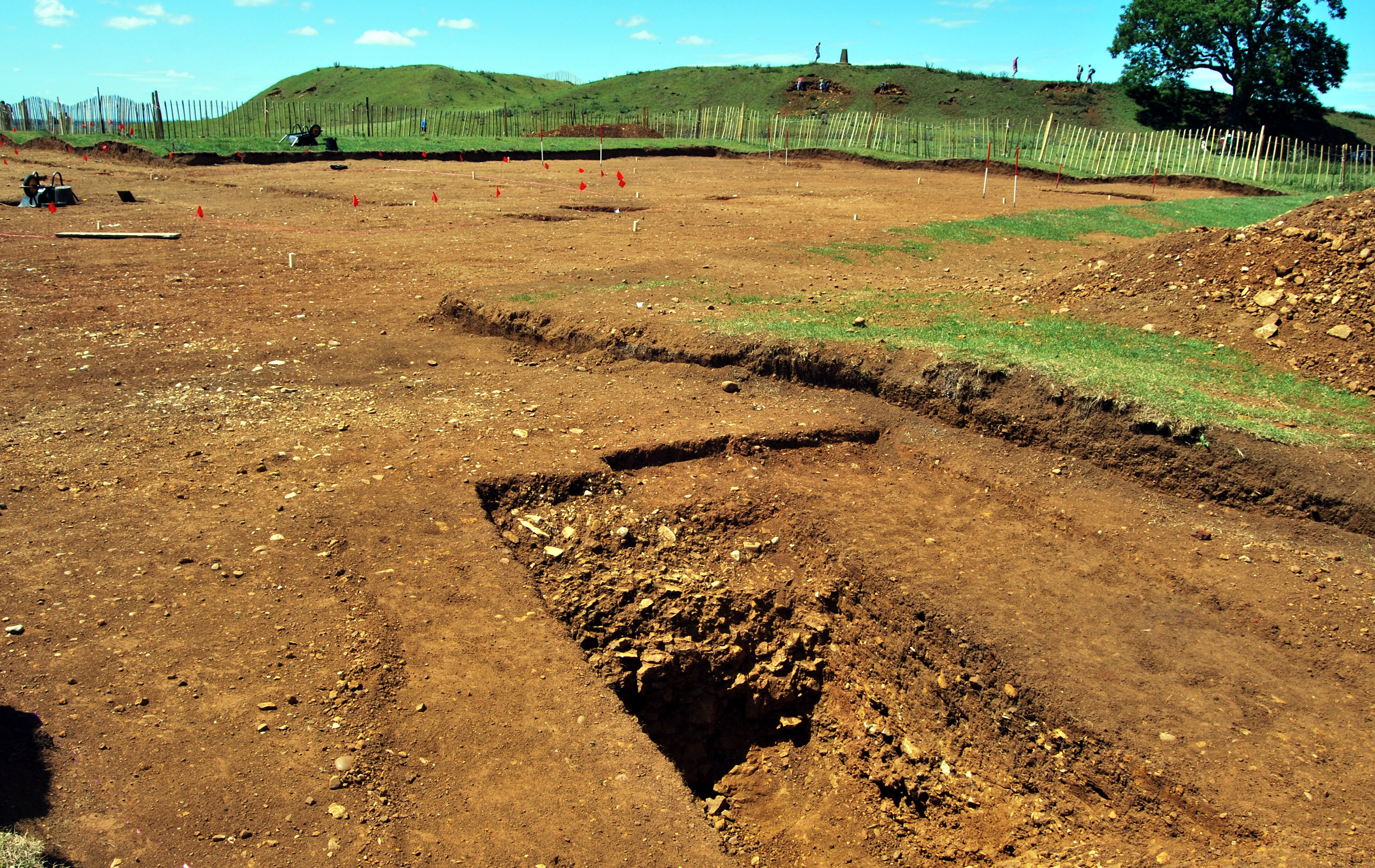
Excavations near the main entrance, June 2011

In 2010 a five-year excavation began on the site, carried out by the University of Leicester School of Archaeology & Ancient History with the University of Leicester Archaeological Services (ULAS). According to Dr Patrick Clay research in the 1990s and 2000s on farmsteads and undefended settlements had revealed much about Iron Age Leicestershire, however the role of hillforts in the county was less clear. The excavations aimed to address the issue of the purpose of hillforts in the region, and also acted as a training dig for students at the university. The hillfort is a Scheduled Monument, which means it is a "nationally important" structure and archaeological site which has been given protection against unauthorised change. Assessing the progress of the excavations after the first three years of excavations, John Thomas who was in charge of the project remarked

The last excavations focussed on a series of large storage pits that had become filled in with domestic refuse and produced a significant collection of objects including one of the largest groups of Iron Age metalwork from the East Midlands [about 100 items]. Further finds shed light on their social lives; a bone dice and gaming pieces were discovered alongside a polished bone flute and beautifully decorated blue glass bead from a necklace. These finds contrast sharply with artefacts found on other contemporary sites such as small farmsteads, suggesting differences in status and access to a wider range of material culture.

== See also ==
- Hallaton Treasure – a large hoard of Iron Age treasure discovered in Leicestershire
- Hillforts in Britain
