= Fen Rivers Way =

50-mile footpath in east England

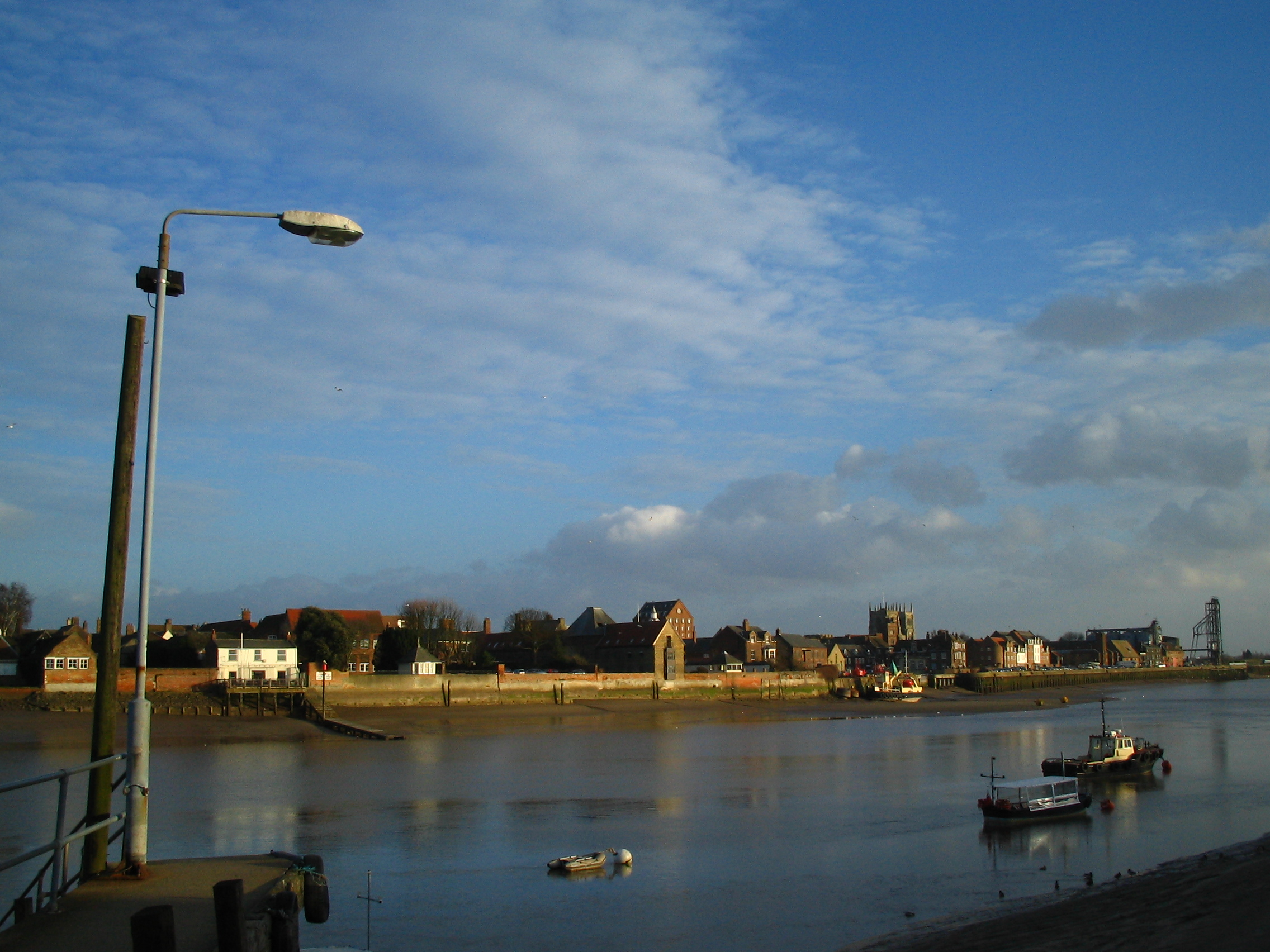
- King's Lynn lies at a trailhead
- Length: 80 km (50 mi)
- Location: Eastern England, United Kingdom
- Trailheads: Cambridge, Cambridgeshire; 52.1942°N 0.1372°E; King's Lynn, Norfolk; 52.7474°N 0.3955°E
- Use: Hiking

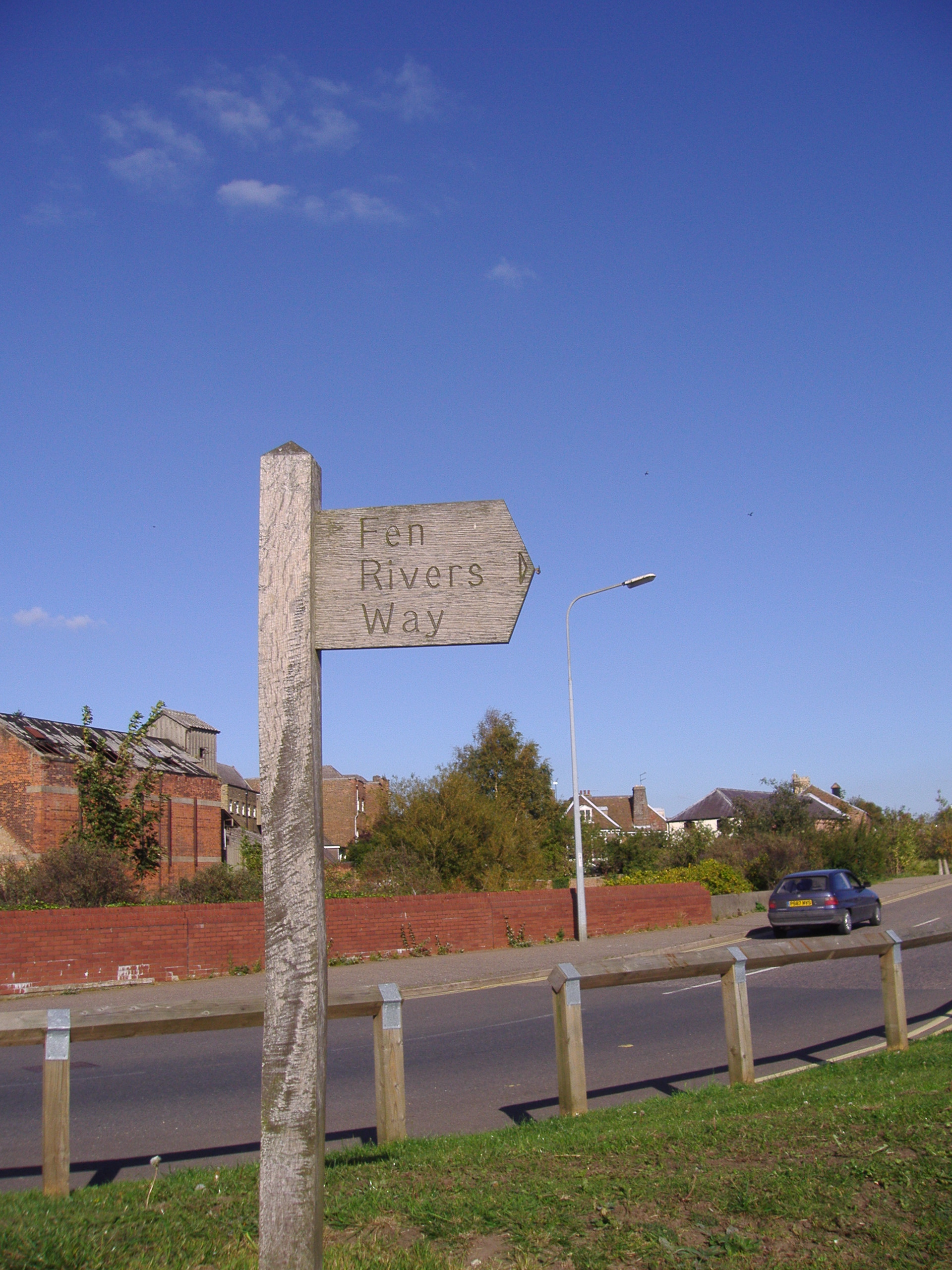
Sign at the King's Lynn end of the path

The Fen Rivers Way is a long distance footpath that spans a distance of 50 miles (80 km). It runs between the City of Cambridge and the town of King's Lynn in West Norfolk. It follows the course of the River Cam and River Great Ouse across the Fenland landscape into the Wash. It provides a small part of European Long Distance Path E2 which goes from Nice to Galway.

== Description ==
The Fenland landscape is a man-made environment constructed over many centuries. This fertile land is dominated by agriculture and is dissected by dykes, draining ditches, rivers and embankments. The walk gives walkers the opportunity to see the Fenland's open landscape and skies that contribute to the character of the Fens. The walk has a number of points of historical and wildlife interest. The route passes close to five railway stations, offering opportunities for one-way walks of varying lengths.

== The route ==
Starting from Cambridge, the route follows the River Cam with its banks and pastures fringed with weeping willow trees and out into the fens. The Cam Washes have been designated a Site of Special Scientific Interest because of their rare and special habitats and wildlife. Within this SSSI, otters can sometimes be seen. Approximately 17 miles (27 km) north-east of Cambridge is Wicken Fen National Nature Reserve, where walkers will pass through the remains of a fragment of a Fenland wilderness of former times. Wicken Fen was the first nature reserve to be owned by the National Trust and has been in its care since 1899. Wicken Fen is a haven for birds, plants, insects and mammals. It can be explored by the traditional wide droves and lush green paths, including a boardwalk nature trail, giving access to several hides.

A little north of here, the River Cam joins the River Great Ouse. Next walkers approach the city of Ely. The magnificent Ely Cathedral and ancient city dominate the skyline for miles around. At the hamlet of Brandon Creek, the Great Ouse is joined by the River Little Ouse and the route enters the county of Norfolk.

The Great Ouse is now contained by flood banks and from these banks there are views of the surrounding countryside. Denver Sluice, being at the confluence of five watercourses, was first built across the river in 1651 as a focus of the flood defence system that protects the low lying Fens, although it had to be rebuilt after bursting in 1713. Nearby Denver Windmill is a fully restored 19th century windmill which lies on the path of the Roman Fen Causeway. The Ouse Washes are an internationally significant environment. Flooded in winter, they attract thousands of migrating wildfowl. From Denver the river is tidal, bringing with it subtle changes in scenery and habitat. Close by is the Relief Channel, the final link in the drainage system, completed in 1964. The two waterways meet at King's Lynn, the historic port on the edge of the Wash where the footpath ends.

== Way markings ==
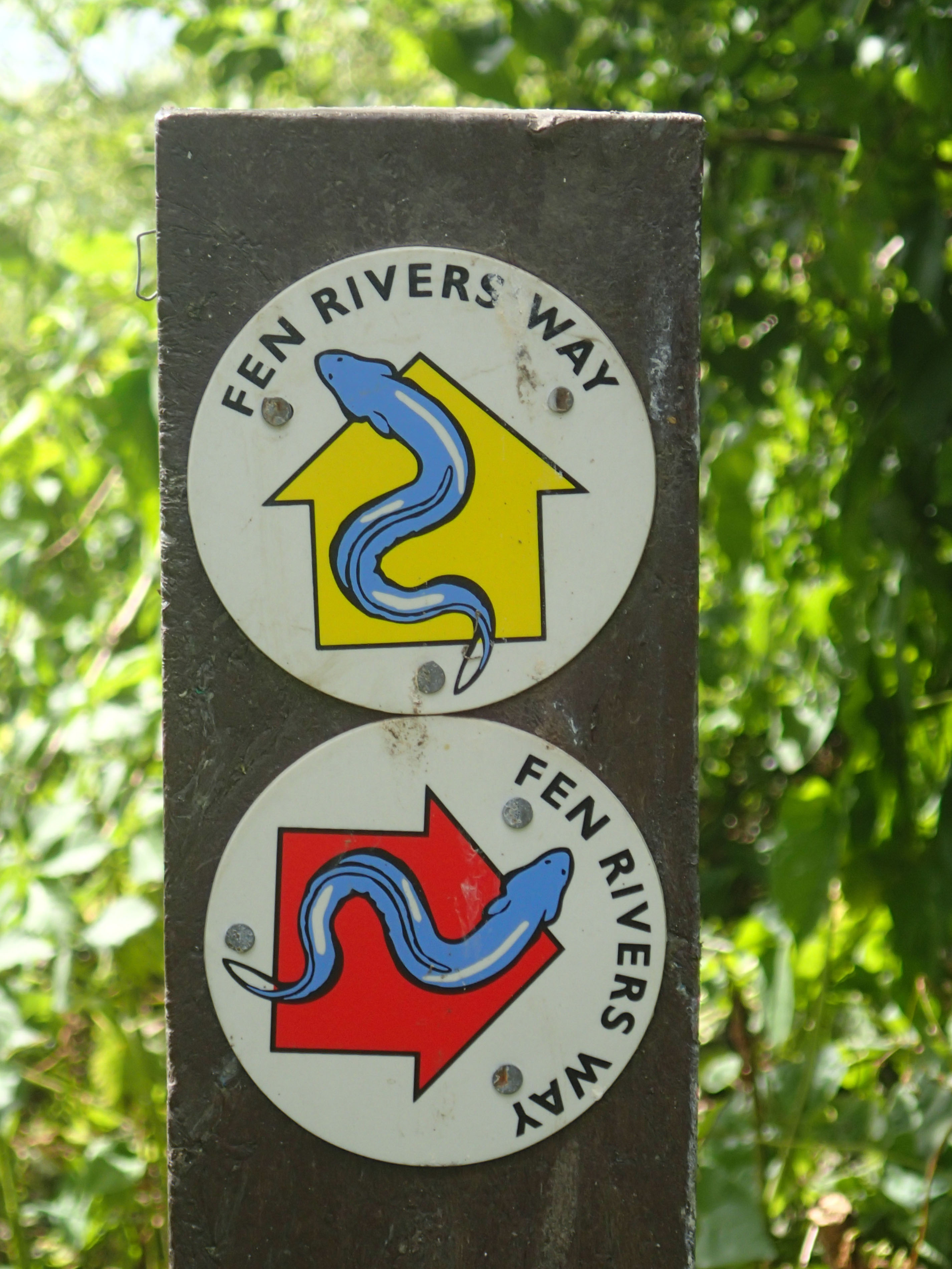
Fen Rivers Way waymarks (yellow for footpath and red for byway)

The route is marked with a small circular badge with a blue eel logo.

In 1995, Cambridge's local newspaper, The Cambridge Evening News, ran a competition for its children's Saturday Club, to name the route and design the logo. The winning entry naming the walk "Fen Rivers Way" with an eel as the logo, was submitted by Alexander Hunt from Teversham.

== Further walks ==
There are four smaller circular walks along the Fen Rivers Way.

- Wicken Fen Walk
- Baits Bite Walk
- Fenland Village Walk
- The Cutters Walk
