= Macula (archaeology) =

Archaeology term

Macula (plural maculae) is a term used by archaeologists to describe small two-dimensional features of ancient human origin visible on an aerial photograph. These appear as points, spots or patches, which may represent features such as burial places, pits, Grubenhäuser (homesteads with sunken floors), constructions marked by postholes, or features above ground level.

Maculae are differentiated from other features visible in aerial photographs such as enclosures, linear features and linear systems, which include paths, roads, boundaries or limits. Identification and interpretation of maculae in aerial photographs is difficult and depends upon the experience of the observer, who has to take factors such as shape, size, relative position or proximity to other maculae, ground condition, and knowledge of cultural practices of ancient humans in the region under observation, into account.

The term is used in a different context in art on objects where it refers to the mesh of a net (in singular), or its depiction, the plural being maculae.
