= Pickwell =

Village in Leicestershire, England

Coordinates: 52.694°N 0.840°W

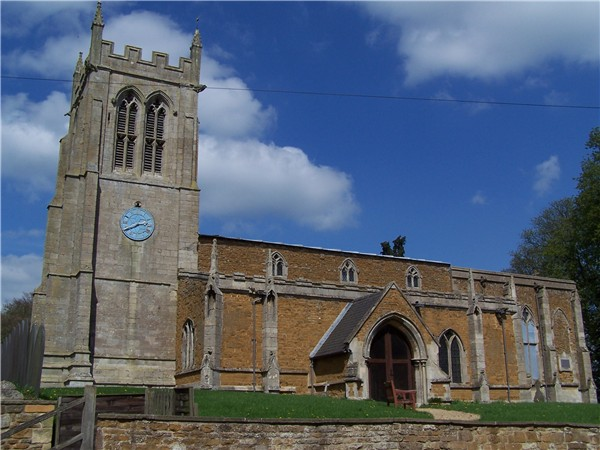
- All Saints church

- Location within Leicestershire
- Civil parish: Somerby
- District: Melton
- Shire county: Leicestershire
- Region: East Midlands
- Country: England
- Sovereign state: United Kingdom

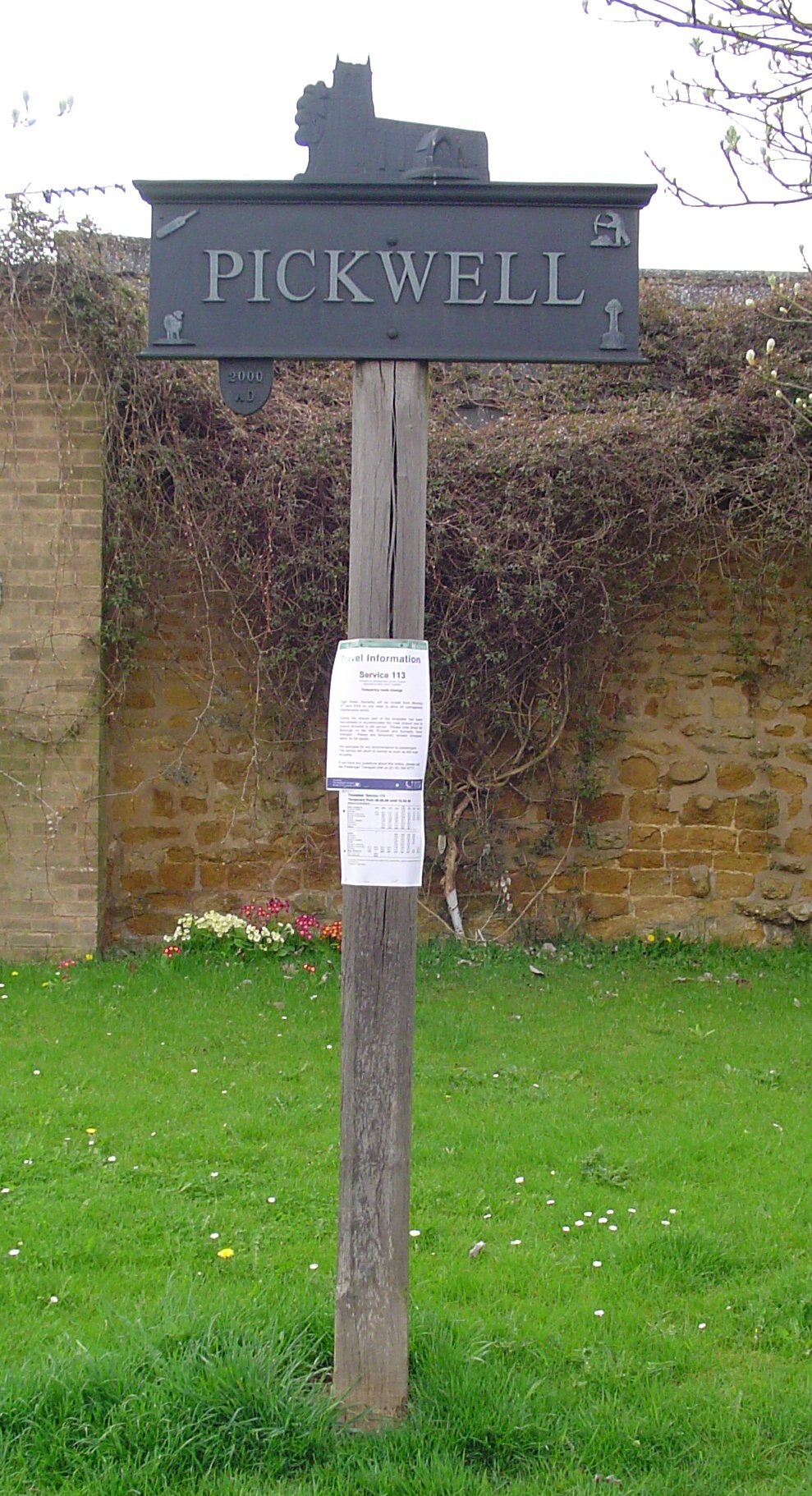
Signpost by listed barn in the village

Pickwell is a small, hill-crest village 5 miles (8.0 km) south-east of Melton Mowbray in the Melton district, in Leicestershire which used to have an ecclesiastical parish of its own and is since the early 20th century has been in the civil parish and Church of England parish of Somerby which is 0.5 miles (0.80 km) to the SSW, connected by an almost straight lane.

A spring rises here as the source of a small stream which explains the well part of its name.

== Landmarks ==
=== Church ===
All Saints's tower was built in the 15th century with earlier features dating from the 13th century. Its distinctive features include a wide array of double lancet windows, a full complement of four gargoyles and a moulded parapet and gable roof with cross, and further cross finials to its east end. Altogether the church has gained Grade I listed building status for its architecture.

Its south aisle with porch was rebuilt by R. W. Johnson in 1860.

=== Manor ===
Pickwell Manor is also Grade II listed and is an entirely rebuilt structure of the late 17th century, with later additions. It is five bays wide, has a Collyweston slate roof and attics. Its windows are its particular architectural note with a squat Venetian window and a round-headed plain sash in fine ashlar surrounds surmounted by a keystone head.

== History ==
Under Edward the Confessor Pickwell and Leesthorpe manors and in all but their rectories were held by Ordmar, and in 1086 of the king by Geoffrey de Wirce. In 1129 Pickwell and Leesthorpe were held by Roger de Mowbray (Lord of Montbray) who had acquired all Geoffrey's land in Leicestershire. The Mowbray family continued to hold Pickwell and Leesthorpe as tenants-in-chief until the 15th century. After the death of John de Mowbray, 4th Duke of Norfolk, in 1476, and of his daughter and heir Anne in 1481, the Mowbray estates were divided between the representatives of her two co-heirs, one of whom, William, Lord Berkeley, obtained the overlordship of Pickwell and Leesthorpe for considerable time for his family: last mentioned in connection with Pickwell and Leesthorpe in 1630. Under the Mowbrays the abbey of Vaudey held the manor at Leesthorpe in the old parish, and in the 12th century another holding, at Pickwell and Leesthorpe, was held by the Camville family.

Under Henry II Walter de Camville held land (later known as Camville Fee) at Pickwell which had apparently been in the possession of the Camville family before he inherited it. Walter was succeeded by his son Roger. By 1279 the Camville fee at Pickwell and Leesthorpe was being held as 3 knights' fees by Andrew of Astley, or Eastley, before being leased to the Morwic and Sproxton families. In 1299 the Morwic lands were co-held by de Bulmer, de Lumley, and de Waterville heirs.

Later names of heirs were de Kelleby, Bek. and le Brabazon, and by 1346 William Curzon whose family thereafter appears as the only considerable landowners at Pickwell itself and the family continued to hold the manor which appears to be the main estate, until 1532, when Thomas Curzon sold his lands in the parish, then described as the manors of Pickwell and Leesthorpe, to Richard Cave. The manor was held by the Caves until sold in 1638 by William Cave to Elizabeth Hicks, Viscountess Camden. From her the lands, generally described subsequently simply as the manor of Pickwell, passed to her descendants, the Noel family, Earls of Gainsborough who were still in possession in 1936.

Until 1 April 1936 it was in the civil parish of Pickwell with Leesthorpe.

=== Leesthorpe Manor ===
After being granted to and then forfeited by the anti-Protestant execution of John Dudley, 1st Duke of Northumberland, (throughout 1544–1553), a series of sales arrived, first to Thomas Farnham of Quorndon, then Robert Dudley, Earl of Leicester, then Sir Anthony Mildmay. Then in 1658 was a family sale to Edmund Arnold. Later owners appear to have ceded much land with John Suffield Brown, Ayscough Smith and Rev. A. T. Smith at different later periods being the latter owners of the manor.
