= Burrough on the Hill =

Village in Leicestershire, England

Coordinates: 52.688°N 0.882°W

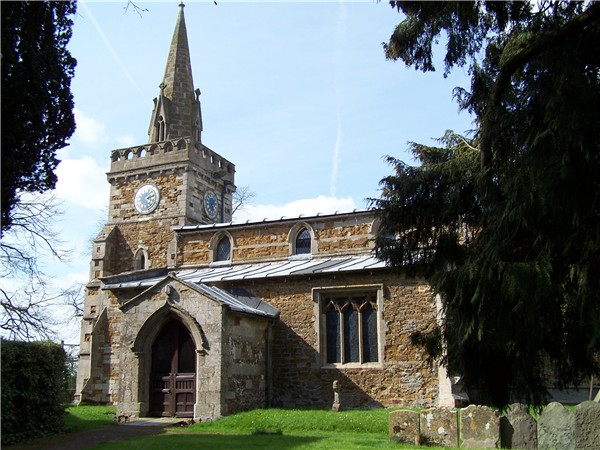
- Burrough on the Hill parish church of St. Mary

- Location within Leicestershire
- Civil parish: Somerby
- District: Melton
- Shire county: Leicestershire
- Region: East Midlands
- Country: England
- Sovereign state: United Kingdom

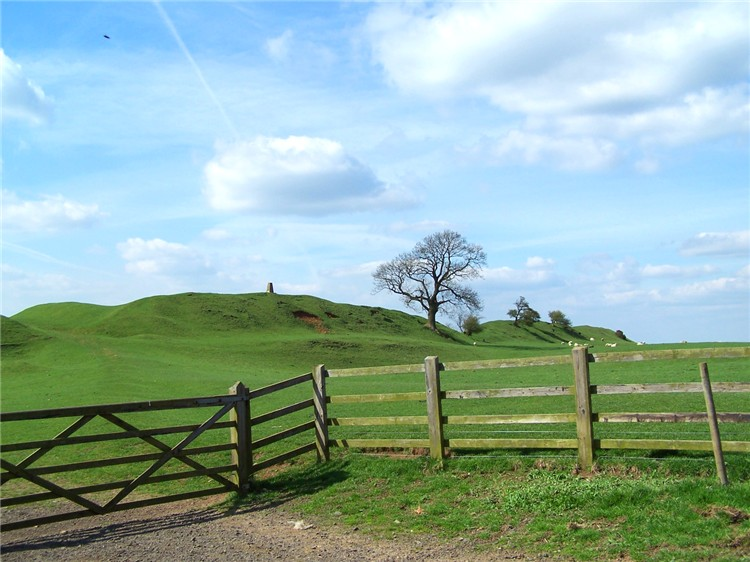
Burrough Hill Iron Age fort

Burrough-on-the Hill is a small village and former civil parish, now in the parish of Somerby, in the Melton district, in the county of Leicestershire, England. It is 12 miles (19 km) north east of Leicester. The parish church is St. Mary the Virgin. Burrough Hill is an Iron Age hill fort near the village and is in an 86-acre (35 ha) country park of the same name. The hillfort stands on a promontory around 660 feet (200 m) above sea level, 7 miles (11 km) south of the ancient settlement of Melton Mowbray. In 1931 the parish had a population of 214.

The village's name means 'fortification on the hill'. Though later forms of Old English show that it could mean 'the earthen fortification on the hill'.

On 1 April 1936 the parish was abolished and merged with Somerby.

The village shared John O'Gaunt railway station with the neighbouring village of Twyford. The station is adjacent to a 14-arch viaduct. Trains used to go north to Melton Mowbray, and south to Leicester and Market Harborough, but the line was closed in the 1960s. There is a local bus service to Melton Mowbray and Oakham.

10th Battalion, the Parachute Regiment During preparations for Operation Market Garden the 10th Battalion, the Parachute Regiment were billeted in and around Somerby before setting off to join the action the day after the outbreak of the Battle of Arnhem on 18 September 1944.

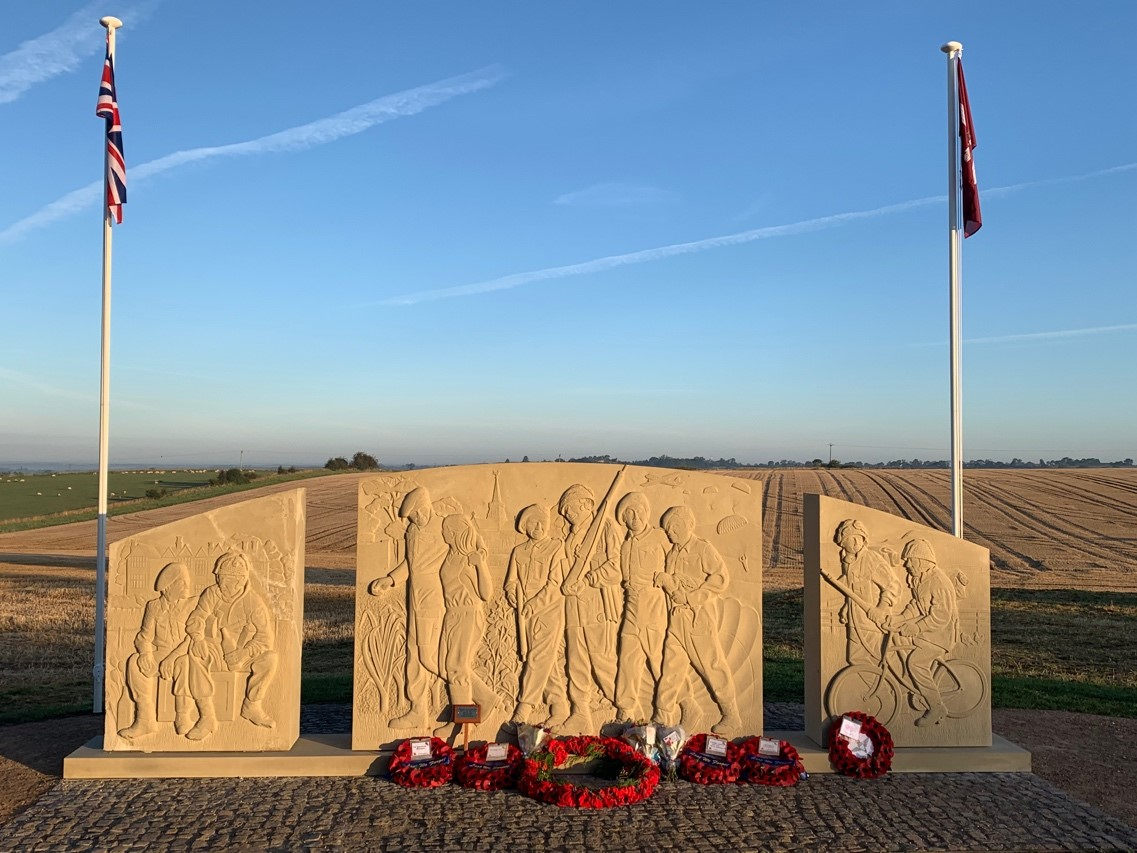
The 10th Battalion, The Parachute Regiment Memorial at Burrough on the Hill

The 10th Battalion, The Parachute Regiment Memorial at Burrough on the Hill was completed and unveiled in September 2019 by Friends of the Tenth. A memorial garden has also been created looking over and across to the valley where the battalion practised parachute drops and training exercises in 1944.

== Population ==
Population growth in Burrough on the Hill since 1801
Year	1801	1811	1821	1831	1841	1851	1881	1891	1901	1911	1921	1931
Population	138	138	183	173	149	135	149	139	149	200	206	214
Source: A Vision of Britain through Time and the Office for National Statistics

== Famous Horses ==
British thoroughbred racehorse Burrough Hill Lad was named after Burrough on the Hill by owner Stan Riley, who was born and raised in the village. After a run of victories in 1984 including the Cheltenham Gold Cup, Hennessy Gold Cup and King George VI Chase, Burrough Hill Lad was considered one of the greatest racehorses in the history of the sport.
