= Burton and Dalby =

Civil parish in Leicestershire, England

Coordinates: 52.728°N 0.864°W

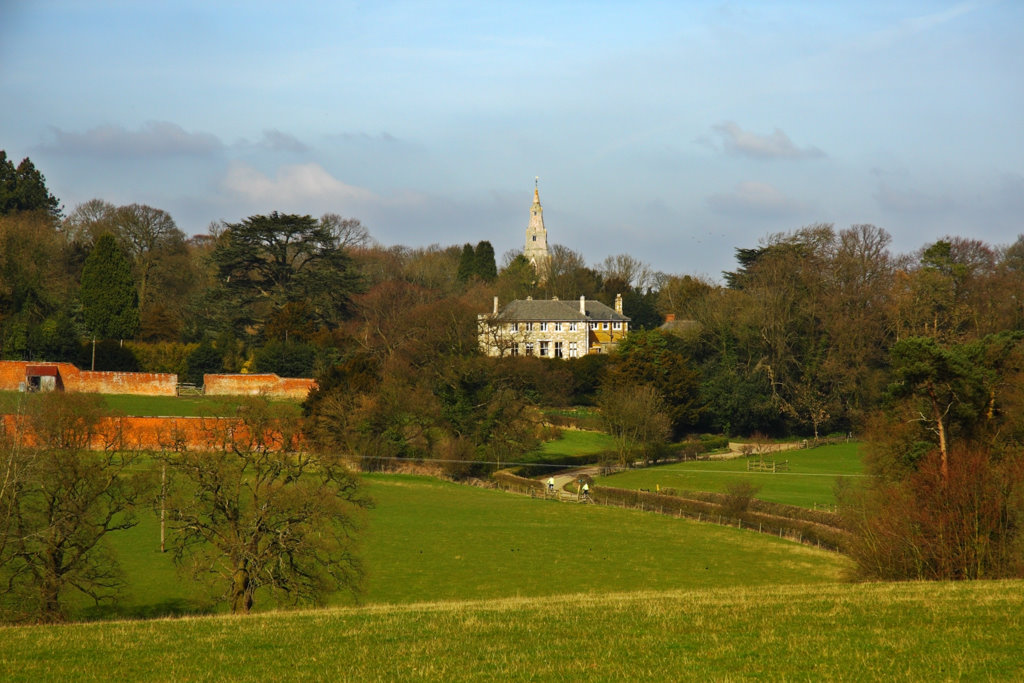
Little Dalby

Burton and Dalby is a civil parish in the Melton district of Leicestershire, England, to the south of Melton Mowbray. It covers the villages of Burton Lazars, Great Dalby and Little Dalby and according to the 2001 census had a population of 895, Increasing to 985 at the 2011 census.
