= Harry Wheatcroft =

British gardener

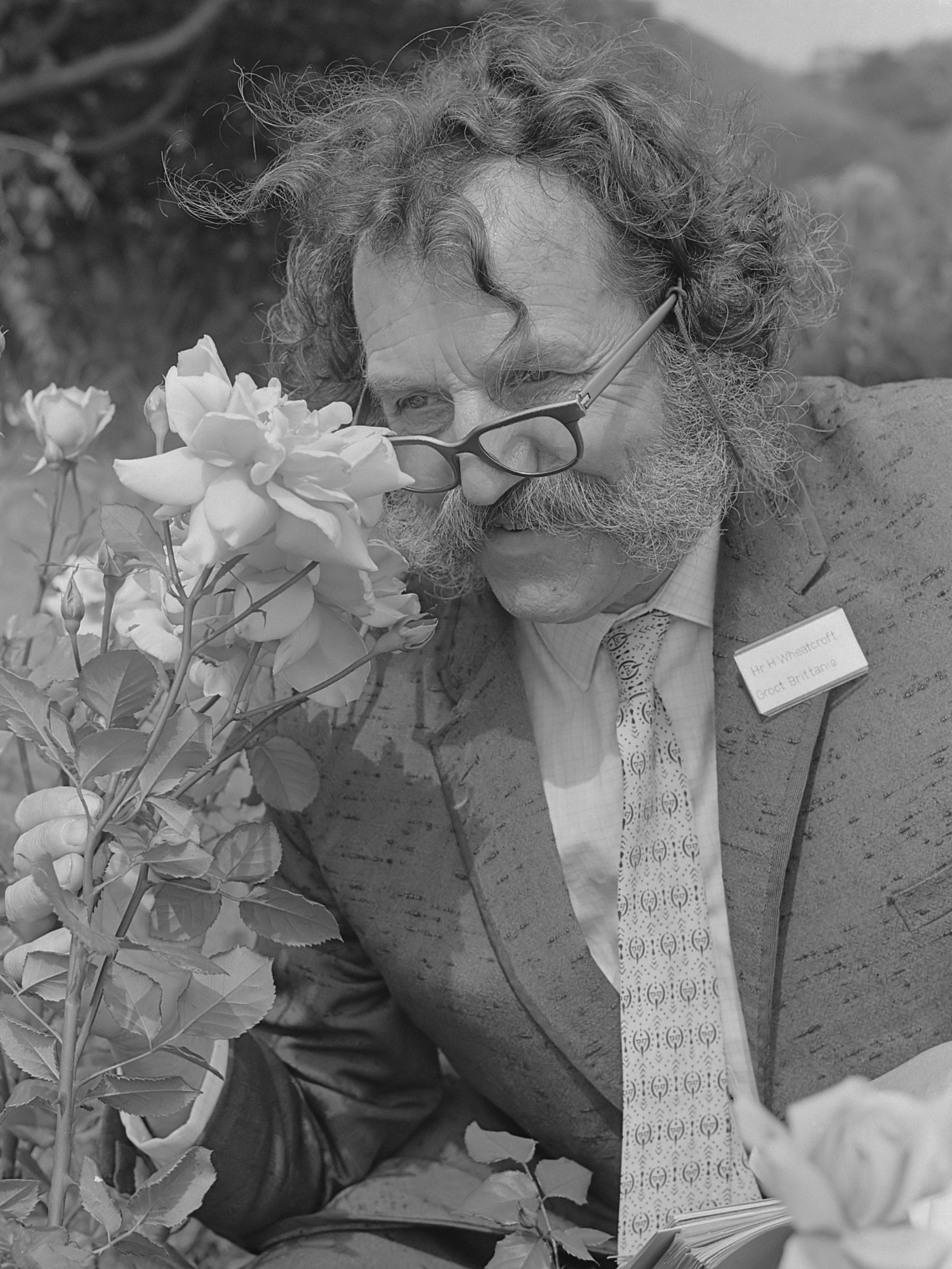
Harry Wheatcroft (1963)

Harry Wheatcroft (1898–1977) was an English rose grower. He did a great deal to popularise roses among British gardeners. He was known for his flamboyant appearance and opinions.

== Early life ==
Wheatcroft was born at 23 Handel Street, Sneinton, Nottingham, the younger son of George Alfred Wheatcroft (b. 1862/3), a journeyman stonemason and builder, and his wife, Sarah Elizabeth Wood. They were dedicated members of the Independent Labour Party, whose leaders visited the modest family home, and on many occasions the young Harry sat on Keir Hardie's knee. Wheatcroft attended schools in Nottingham and also the Ecole Camille Desmoulins at Saint-Quentin, France, where he became fluent in French. After working in a lace factory and a motor firm he was conscripted in 1916, despite having claimed registration as a conscientious objector. He was court-martialled for disobedience and sentenced to two years' imprisonment in Wormwood Scrubs. Diagnosed with tuberculosis, however, he was released after serving one year to convalesce at a Quaker health home.

== Post-World War I ==
Wheatcroft considered whether to enter politics or join his brother Alfred as a market gardener. The politician James Maxton guided him into horticulture, saying 'You'll bring beauty into the world. Politics is a very dirty business' . The horticultural firm of Wheatcroft Brothers was established in 1919, with a bicycle as the only means of transport, and in 1920 roses became a speciality. Alfred managed the business and Harry was the salesman, often away looking for custom and attending horticultural shows. This worked well because the two never got on, Alfred being misanthropic and Harry outgoing. In 1927 they introduced the Princess Elizabeth rose to honour the royal baby; it was the first of many public relations successes. For the rest of his career Wheatcroft sought and won media attention. He grew into a striking figure, tall and slender until he filled out in middle age, with a pleasing gruff voice and a gift for witty repartee. He cultivated flowing hair and whiskers, finding them "more convenient to grow... than to waste valuable time shaving them off."

== Married life ==
On 15 June 1929 Wheatcroft married Dorothy, known as Doss (1905–1999) the daughter of John Averill, a wealthy Tamworth farmer. She was a gymnast and dietician. Under her influence Wheatcroft became mainly vegetarian and his health improved. They lived at the nursery in Gedling, Nottingham, in a custom built Gypsy caravan, arousing curiosity when they took it to the shows. In winter Wheatcroft used a motor cycle when seeking wholesale outlets for unsold plants. He visited breeders in Spain and France, using his linguistic skill, and returned with rose varieties for future introduction. Wheatcroft's marketing of some of those plants might suggest that the firm had originated them, but in truth they had minimal success as rose breeders. In 1935 their launch of Herbert Robinson's Phyllis Gold and Christopher Stone with unprecedented publicity surprised the British rose world. Such vigorous salesmanship was something new.

On the outbreak of World War II Wheatcrofts had 600,000 roses 'about four feet high and in full flower. It appeared there was only one course we could take, which was to destroy our trees and convert the land for food production'. They became instead successful producers of vegetables and breeders of pigs and cattle. After the war Wheatcroft contacted Francois Meilland of Lyons, whose rose, Peace, the sensation of the time, he introduced to Britain in 1948.

== Success as a rose grower ==
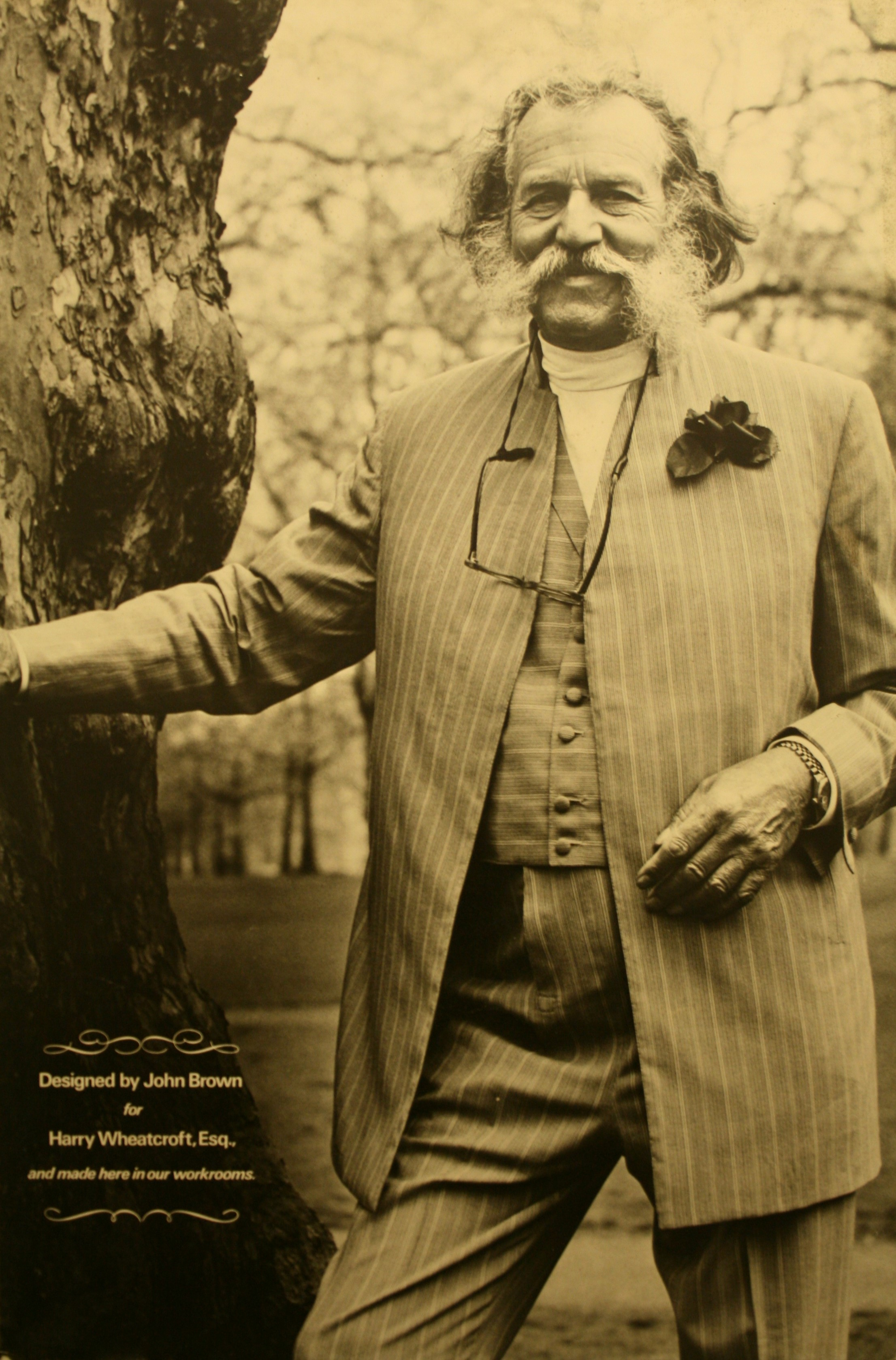
Wheatcroft in 1966

In 1952 he introduced Queen Elizabeth from the USA. In 1953, Wheatcroft sought to register eleven rose names as trademarks to give them a monopoly over Meilland's creations. In the Chancery Division, 'With his Dundreary whiskers, his mane of black hair, his suit of black-and-white check ... the Nottingham rose king made as picturesque a figure this week as the Law Courts have seen'. He made the judge laugh and lost the case, but reckoned the publicity well worth the £2000 costs. Wheatcroft exhibited two German roses: Super Star in London (which appeared as 'the Great Unnamed Seedling' before the name had been agreed) and Fragrant Cloud in the National Rose Society's autumn show in 1963. He is also remembered for his TV advertising of Acta-Bacta plant nutrient in the 1960s

== Split with Alfred Wheatcroft ==
In 1962, when longstanding strained relationships with his brother came to a head, Wheatcroft joined his sons in a rival firm, which bought out the older company to become the Wheatcroft Organization. With capable young family members running the day-to-day business (never his strong suit) Wheatcroft gave his publicity skills free rein. His whiskers and dress became more bizarre. Out of a huge maroon Rolls-Royce would appear his tall, gangling figure. Clad in a floral shirt with royal-blue trousers flecked with colour, or perhaps in a suit of dogtooth tweed trimmed with tangerine velvet, against which his horn-rimmed spectacles swung wildly from a string. He captivated photographers, the media, and the gardening public. Show reports carried his picture even when his firm's participation had been minimal. He travelled the world, lectured extensively, and wrote books, and his television appearances included a commercial advertising cheese. During this period Wheatcroft committed a social indiscretion at the Royal Horticultural Society's Chelsea Flower Show by staging roses without a shirt on. It has been recounted that the president, Lord Aberconway, approached: 'A hot day, Harry!' 'Indeed, my lord.' 'Tell you what, Harry, if you'll put a shirt on, I'll take my jacket off!'

The society honoured him in 1972 with the Victoria Medal of Honour, and in 1973 he was awarded the Royal National Rose Society's Dean Hole medal. Wheatcroft's prosperity and enjoyment of life's good things never blunted his sometimes naive expression of left-wing views. He offended a Texan audience by declaring that America might not be embroiled in the Vietnam combat if more Americans grew roses. Yet on attending the May Day parade in Moscow's Red Square, he admiringly described the militarism on display as awe-inspiring.

== Personal life ==
At home he was a quiet, even subdued family man, happy with his five children though with little time to spend with them, for they attended boarding school, and summer holidays coincided with shows. His wife, Doss, was infuriated by a string of infidelities: he shrugged them off, maintaining that yielding to temptation is natural. In the 1960s, he named a red rose for his wife, and a flamboyant red and yellow rose bore his own name in 1972.

Wheatcroft's niece Anna Wheatcroft was married to future Doctor Who star Tom Baker from 1961 to 1966. They had two children, Daniel and Piers. In his book Who on Earth is Tom Baker?, Baker said the rest of the Wheatcroft family treated him very cruelly during his marriage to Anna.

== Death ==
Having suffered a stroke, Wheatcroft died in Nottingham General Hospital on 8 January 1977.

Wheatcroft Garden Centre, in Edwalton in Nottingham, is now operated by Notcutts Ltd.
