= Leesthorpe =

Hamlet in Leicestershire, England

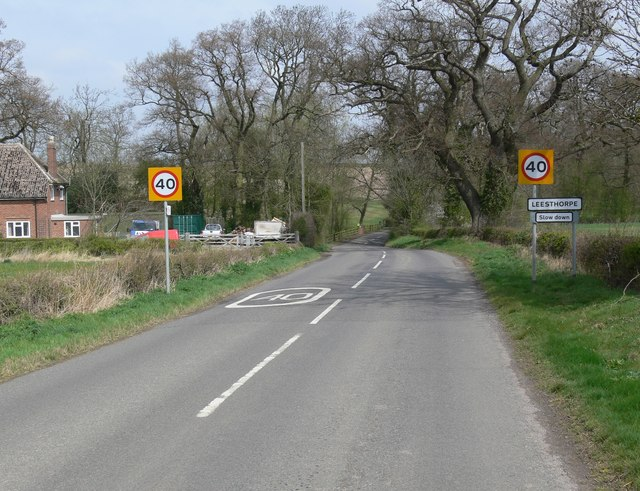
- Approaching Leesthorpe along Leesthorpe Road

- Location within Leicestershire
- Civil parish: Somerby
- District: Melton
- Shire county: Leicestershire
- Region: East Midlands
- Country: England
- Sovereign state: United Kingdom
- Post town: Melton Mowbray
- Postcode district: LE14
- Police: Leicestershire
- Fire: Leicestershire
- Ambulance: East Midlands
- UK Parliament: Melton and Syston

Leesthorpe is a hamlet in the civil parish of Somerby, in the Melton district, in the English county of Leicestershire.

Leesthorpe is located in the north east of the county close to the Rutland border and just south of the A606 Melton Mowbray and Oakham road.

== History ==
Leesthorpe was recorded in the Domesday Book as Luvestorp.

Until 1 April 1936 it was in the civil parish of Pickwell with Leesthorpe.
