= Hereward Way =

Footpath in East Anglia, England

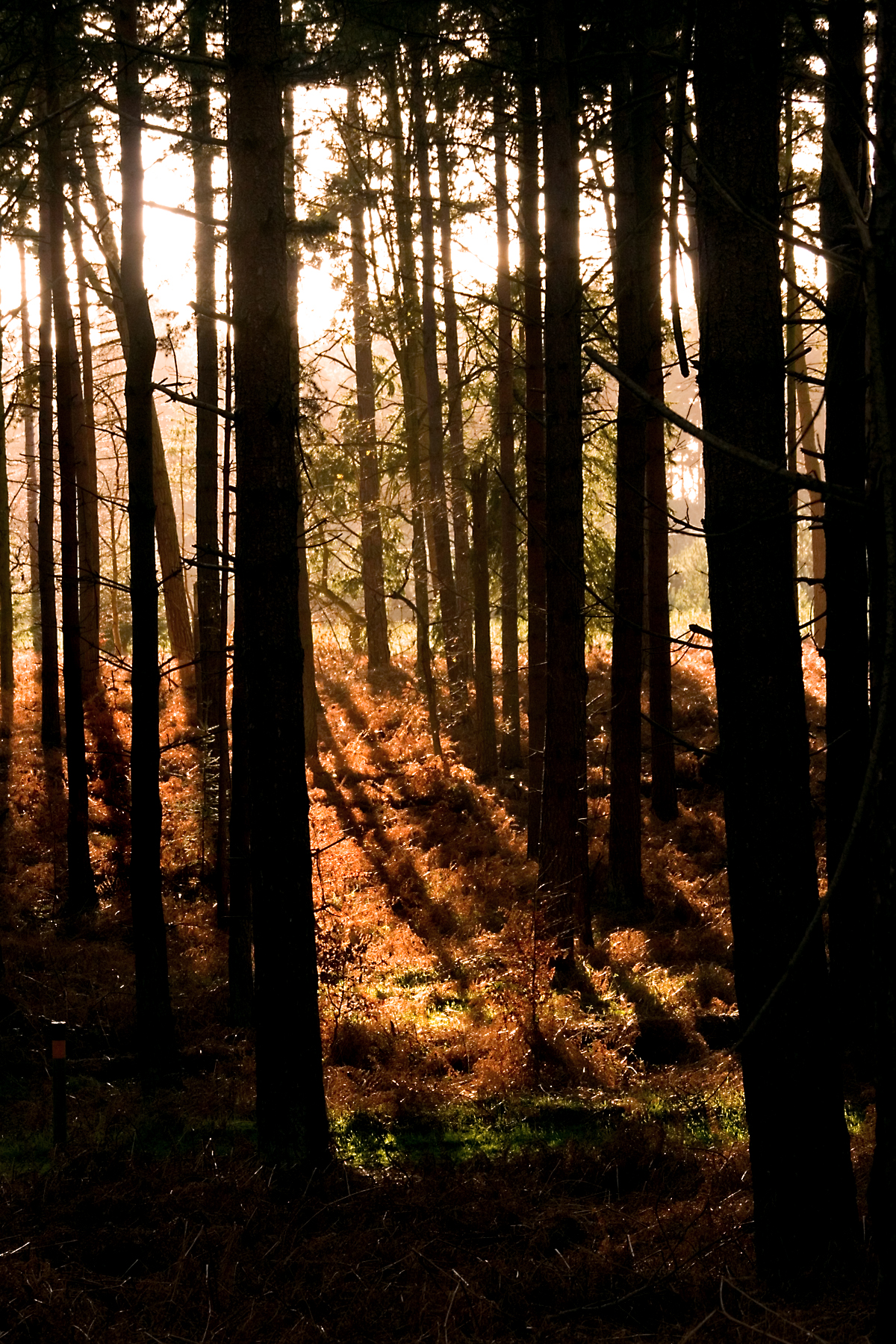
- Thetford Forest lies on the trail
- Length: 110 miles (177 km)
- Location: East Anglia, England
- Trailheads: Oakham, Rutland; 52.6713°N 0.7341°W; East Harling and Harling Road railway station, Norfolk; 52.4538°N 0.9099°E
- Season: All year

The Hereward Way is a long-distance footpath in England that links the Viking Way at Oakham with the Peddars Way at Knettishall Heath, near Thetford.

The path takes its name from Hereward the Wake, the 11th-century rebel leader who fought against William the Conqueror, and who had his base on the Isle of Ely, which is located near to the middle of the path.

Each end of the path has railway access at Oakham railway station and Harling Road railway station respectively. Stations towards the centre of the path are located at Shippea Hill and Ely.

The footpath runs through Stamford, Peterborough, March, Ely and Brandon. It also goes through Thetford Forest. It links two other long-distance footpaths: the Viking Way in the west and Peddars Way in the east.

In August 2006, the Hereward Way between Wansford and Southorpe near Peterborough was diverted under a Peterborough City Council improvement plan. The re-routing was complete with the Peterborough Local Access Forum and means that walkers do not pass alongside the A47.
