= Somerby, Leicestershire =

Village in Leicestershire, England

Coordinates: 52.687°N 0.849°W

Somerby
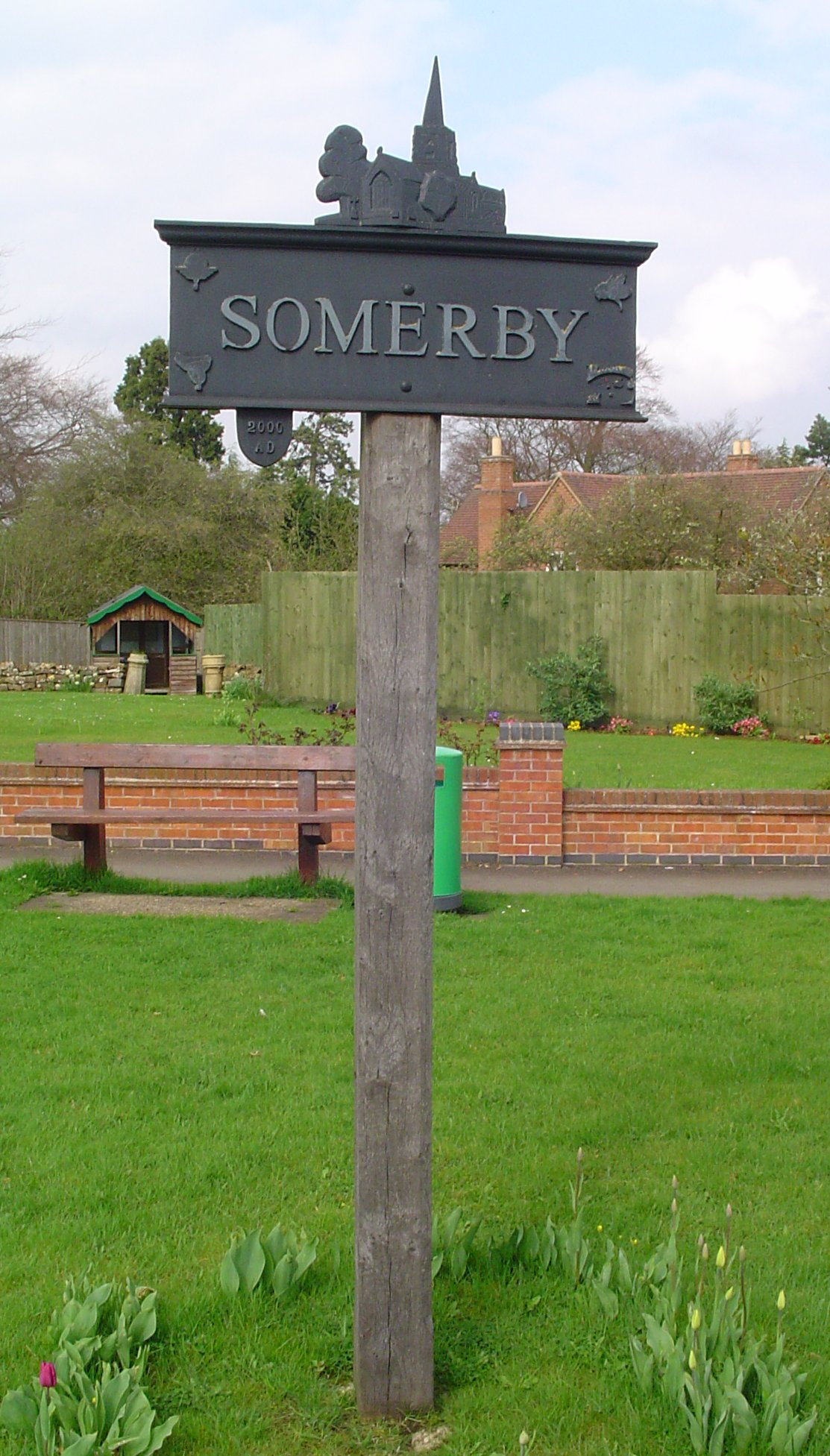
- Signpost in Somerby

- Location within Leicestershire
- Population: 812 (2011 census)
- Civil parish: Somerby
- District: Melton
- Shire county: Leicestershire
- Region: East Midlands
- Country: England
- Sovereign state: United Kingdom
- Post town: Melton Mowbray
- Postcode district: LE14

Somerby is a village and civil parish in the Melton district, in the county of Leicestershire, England. It is 5 1/2 miles (8.9 km) south of Melton Mowbray. The population of the civil parish at the 2011 census was 812.

Somerby is a small country village containing a parish church (All Saints), a primary school, a Doctor's surgery, a pub, a small shop/post office, and a large Equestrian Centre. The population is close to 500. It is the largest village in the parish of Somerby and is located in East Leicestershire close to the border with Rutland; the parish also includes the settlements of Burrough on the Hill, Leesthorpe and Pickwell.

The surrounding countryside is very attractive and is often referred to as 'High Leicestershire'. Much of the Parish is several hundred feet above sea level and there are often superb views to be found. Although predominantly a rural community there are a significant number of successful business enterprises in the local area.

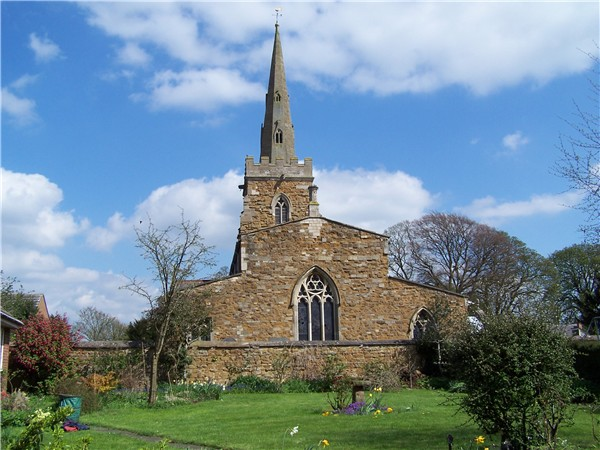
Somerby parish church of All Saints

During World War II, the village was used as a base station and testing ground for Operation Market Garden, the airborne attack on Arnhem.

It was in the parish of Somerby (but the village of Burrough on the Hill) that the surgeon William Cheselden was born.

== History ==
John Major's daughter Elizabeth, aged 28, married on Sunday 26 March 2000, at the parish church. The village was searched by Special Branch.

== See also ==
- John O' Gaunt
