= Teversal, Skegby and Silverhill Trails =

Network of trails in the UK

The Teversal, Skegby and Silverhill Trails are a network of multi-user trails in the Ashfield District, Nottinghamshire. The trails are situated between the villages of Teversal, Skegby, Stanton Hill, Pleasley and the town of Sutton-in-Ashfield.

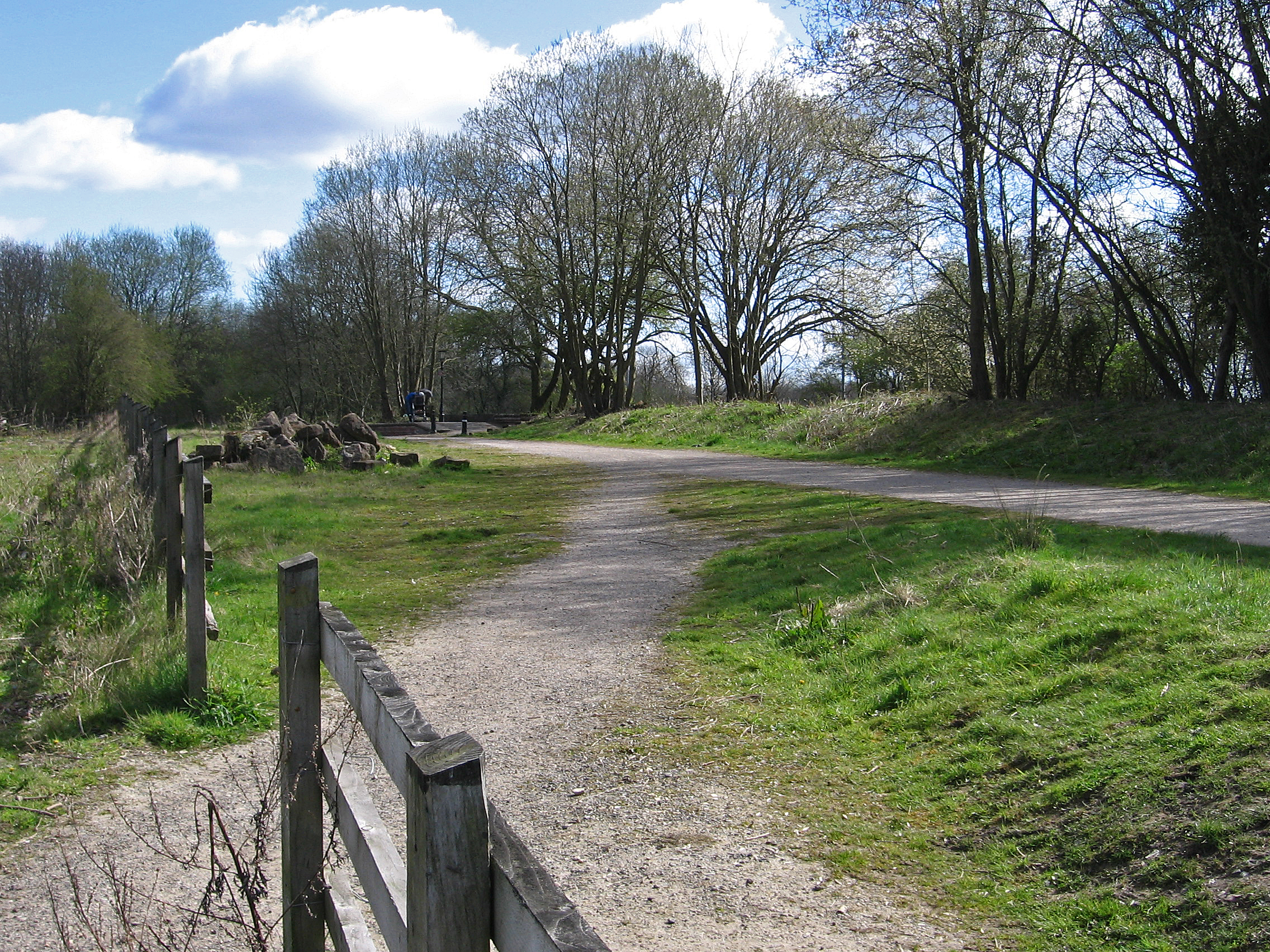
Teversal Trail

The trails are a distance of 5 miles. The trails are suitable for walking, cycling and horse riding.

The Teversal Visitors Centre is along the route of the trails. The village of Teversal inspired D. H. Lawrence within his book Lady Chatterley's Lover, Teversal Manor being based on Wragby Hall. Teversal Manor was formally owned by the Earls of Carnarvon. The Phoenix Greenways form part of the trails which link onto the Five Pits Trail and Brierley Forest Park.

== History ==
The Teversal, Skegby and Silverhill Trails are a set of former railways built by the Great Northern Railway as part of the Leen Valley Extension line.

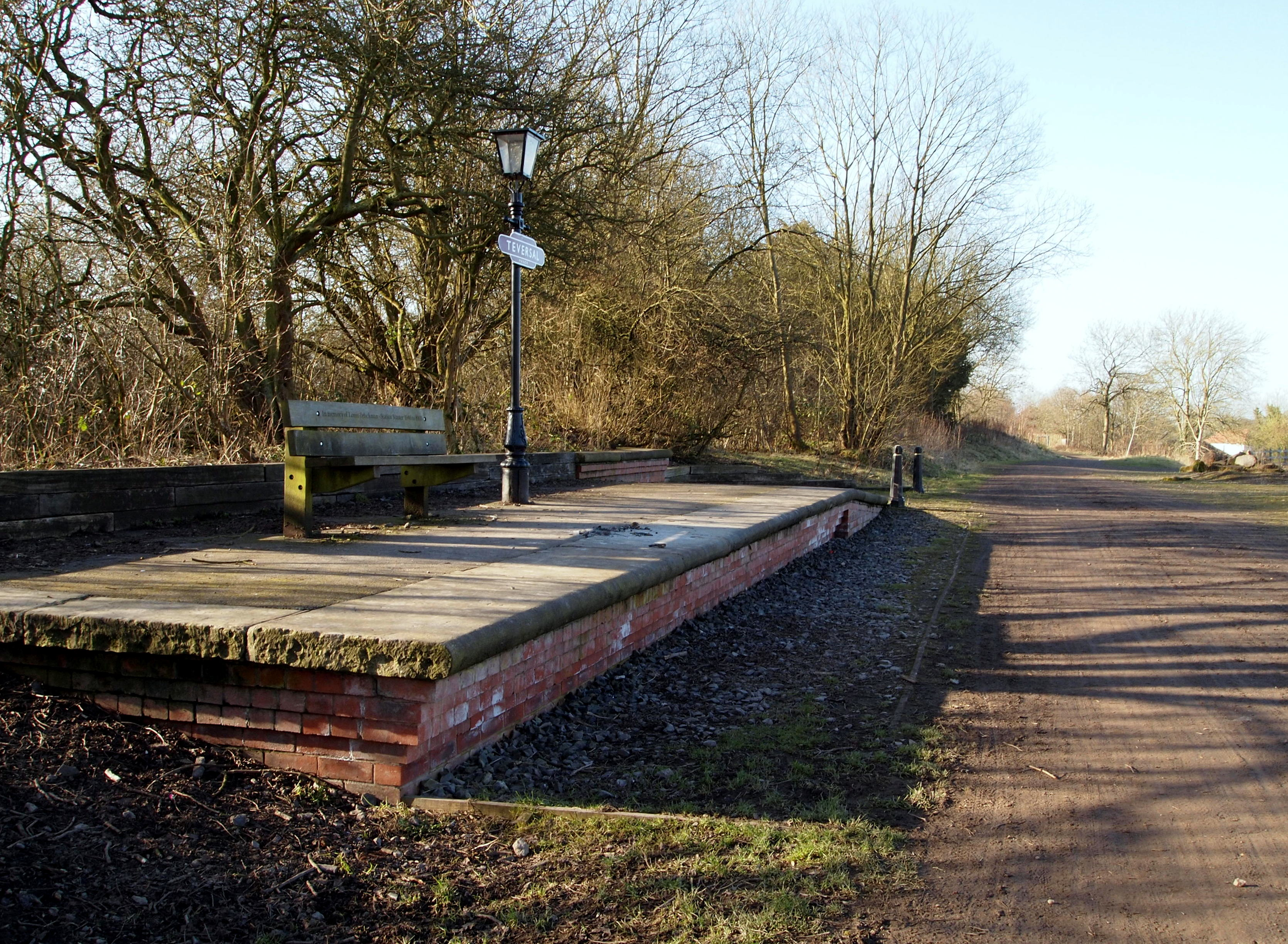
Teversal Manor Station, a former station for passengers

The Stanton Ironworks had several collieries including those at Silverhill, Teversal, Pleasley and Sutton-in-Ashfield.

The trails were used for a short period by passengers but predominantly by coal traffic.

== Places of interest ==
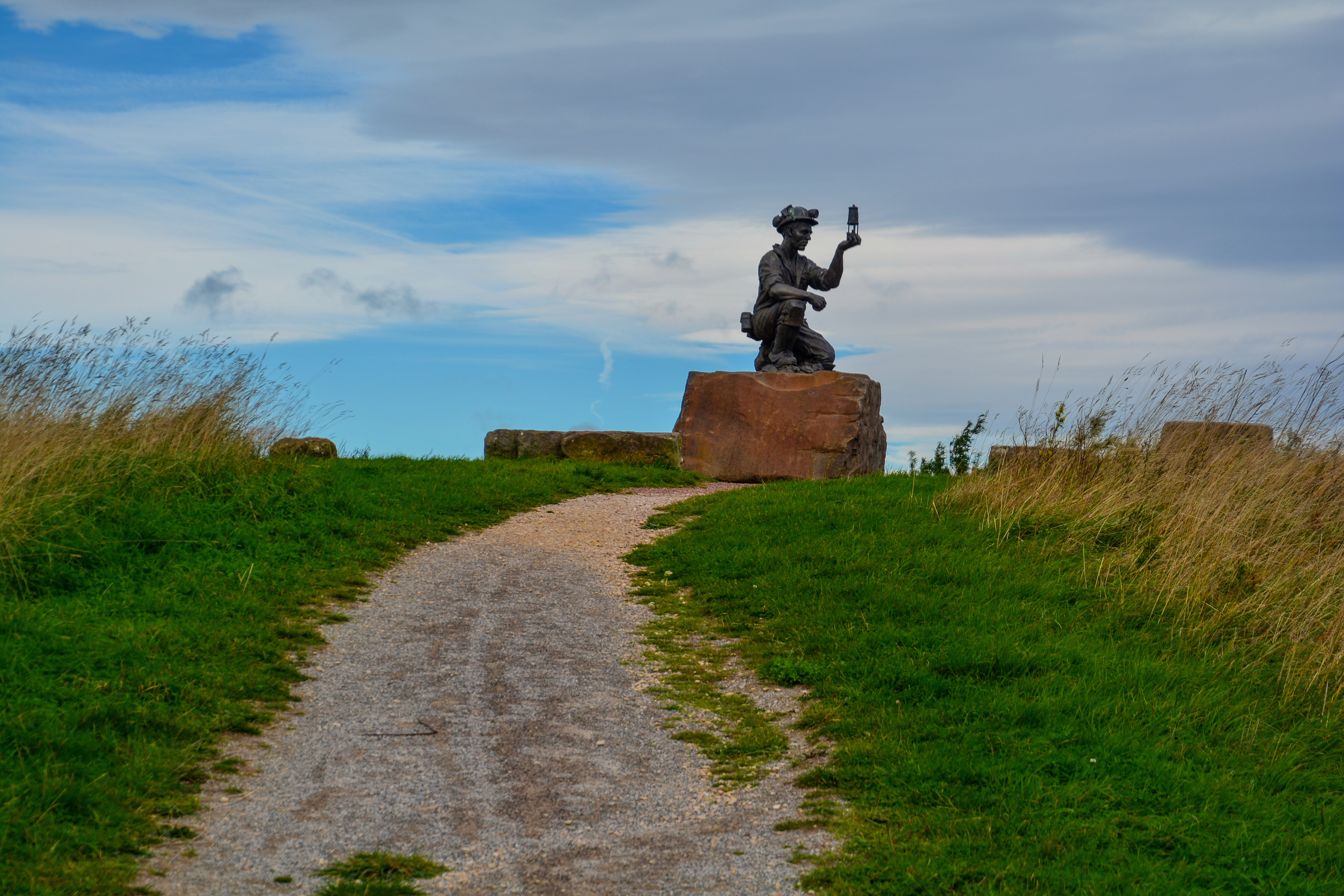
The statue on Silverhill

- Teversal Village
- Silverhill, Nottinghamshire
- Pleasley Colliery
- Brierley Forest Park
- Teversal Visitor Centre
