= Peatling =

Peatling is a surname. Notable people with the surname include:

- James Peatling (born 2000), Australian footballer
- Mason Peatling (born 1997), Australian basketballer

== See also ==
- Peatling Magna, village in Leicestershire, England
- Peatling Parva, village in Leicestershire, England
