= Sir John Molyneux, 1st Baronet =

Sir John Molyneux of Teversal (fl. 1611–1640) was High Sheriff of Nottinghamshire.

Molyneux was the son of Thomas Molyneux (d. 1597) and Alice Cranmer of Aslockton, daughter of Thomas Cranmer, a great-nephew of Archbishop Thomas Cranmer. After the death of Thomas Molyneux, Alice married Sir John Thorold of Syston.

He may have attended Christ's College, Cambridge, listed as fellow-commoner in 1598.

Molyneux was High Sheriff of Nottinghamshire in 1609 and 1611, and became the first of the Molyneux baronets of Teversal on 29 June 1611.

Molyneux's first wife was Isobel Markham of Sedgebrook. His second wife was Anne Harington (d. 1644), widow of Sir Thomas Foljambe of Aldwark (d. 1604), and daughter of Sir James Harington of Ridlington and Frances Sapcote.

In 1609 Molyneux was the administrator of the will of Bridget Markham, who was both his sister-in-law and his second wife's sister. She had been a lady in waiting to Anne of Denmark.

In 1612 he remodelled Teversal Manor which had the date "1612" carved on the entrance door within an earlier Tudor porch. The dining parlour was decorated with a plaster relief with rural scenery, hawking, and the story of Actaeon and Diana. This decoration may have date from Molyneux's time. The house was partly rebuilt in 1811.

Molyneux also made some repairs at St Katherine's Church, Teversal, a door in the chancel was carved "J. M. 1617".

Sir Antony Weldon's satirical description of Scotland in 1617 during the king's visit was written in letter form, including good-wishes for "noble Sir John Mollineux" and his brother.

Anne Harington was a prisoner in the Fleet Prison for debt in 1641.

== Family ==
Molyneux and Isobel Markham had these children;

- Francis (d. 1674), married Theodosia Heron.
- Thomas
- Mary
- Elizabeth (d. 1638) married Gilbert Gregory of Barnby and was buried at St Peter and Paul at Barnby Dun.
- Anne (1605–1633), was buried at Barnby.

Molyneux and Anne Harington had these children;

- Colonel Roger Molyneux of Hasland Hall, who was a page to Elizabeth Stuart, Queen of Bohemia in 1633. He sold Hasland to Captain John Lowe.
- Frances

Baronetage of England
New creation	Baronet (of Teversall); 1611–c. 1640s	Succeeded by Francis Molyneux
