= Bridget Markham =

Bridget Markham (1579–1609), was a courtier to Anne of Denmark and the subject of poems.

Bridget was a daughter of Sir James Harington (1542–1614) of Ridlington, Rutland, and Frances Sapcote (d. 1599) daughter and co-heir of Robert Sapcote of Elton, Huntingdonshire. She was a cousin of the influential courtier Lucy Russell, Countess of Bedford.

== Marriage and the court ==
In 1598 she married Sir Anthony Markham (1577–1604) of Sedgebrook, Lincolnshire. He had been educated at Caius College, Cambridge and Gray's Inn. They were married at Ridlington, in Rutland, by the Rector, Thomas Gibson. She had four children. He was knighted by James VI and I at Belvoir Castle on 23 April 1603. He died on 10 December 1604.

Before her husband's death, Bridget became a lady of the bedchamber to Anne of Denmark, Queen consort of King James VI and I. This appointment was due to the influence of her cousin the Countess of Bedford. She continued to manage her lands at Sedgebrook. She was involved with the queen's wardrobe, buying clothing accessories, fans, garters, and trimmings from suppliers in London, including a milliner Marie Cooke.

Bridget, Lady Markham, died at Twickenham Park, a house belonging to the Countess of Bedford, on 4 May 1609. A relation, and fellow courtier and protégée of the Countess of Bedford, Cecily Bulstrode was also ill at Twickenham, and she died on 6 August 1609.

== Elegies ==
A Latin inscription at St Mary's Church, Twickenham records her close friendship with Lucy, Countess of Bedford, her appointment to the queen's privy chamber, her marriage and death on 4 May 1609.

Epitaphs were composed by John Donne; "Man is the world, and death the ocean", Francis Beaumont "As unthrifts groan in strawe for their Pawned beds", and others.

The Countess of Bedford wrote, "Elegie on the Ladye Marckham by L. C. B., Death be not proud, thy hand gave not this blow". The poem begins by addressing Death and describing the passage of Markham's soul:

Death be not proud, thy hand gave not this blow,
Sin was her captive, whence thy power doth flow;
The executioner of wrath thou art,
But to destroy the just is not thy part.
Thy coming, terror, anguish, grief denounce;
Her happy state, courage, ease, joy pronounce.
From out the crystal palace of her breast,
The clearer soul was called to endless rest,
(Not by the thundering voice, wherewith God threats,
But, as with crowned saints in heaven he treats,)
And, waited on by angels, home was brought,
To joy that it through many dangers sought;
The key of mercy gently did unlock
The doors 'twixt heaven and it, when life did knock.

John Donne's poem alludes to Markham's mortal remains, her 'flesh' refined by her death like Chinese porcelain clay in an alembic to reveal the precious stones that comprise her soul:

But as the tide doth wash the slimy beach,
And leaves embroidered works upon the sand,
So is her flesh refined by death's cold hand.
As men of China, after an age's stay
Do take up porcelain, where they buried clay;
So at this grave, her limbeck, which refines
The diamonds, rubies, sapphires, pearls, and mines,
Of which this flesh was, her soul shall inspire
Flesh of such stuff, as God, when his last fire
Annuls this world, to recompense it, shall,
Make and name then, th'elixir of this all.

== Bridget Markham's will ==
Bridget's will was "published" on 3 May 1609, the day before she died. She hoped Frances would inherit and use her "childbed linen" at Sedgebrook, and her sons would go to Cambridge University. She left a legacy of £20 to Catherine Widmerpoole, a servant of the Countess of Bedford. She gave her sister Anne Harington, Lady Foljambe, a locket with a picture of the Countess of Bedford, and her latest husband Sir John Molyneux of Teversal was made her administrator. To the Countess of Bedford she left her coach and mares, with the household silver she had pawned in London, a crimson velvet gown and a suite of tawny clothes embroidered with cloth of silver, and Bedford was to look after Frances with an allowance of £50 yearly. She gave her fellow courtier Jane Meautys (1581-1659) her ruby and diamond buttons. She wanted three memento mori rings with "death's heads" bought as gifts for Sir Henry Carey, the poet Benjamin Rudyerd, and John Gill. Rudyerd was a contributor to the "Newes, from Anywhence" anthology, with Markham's kinswoman Cecily Bulstrode, and married another cousin Elizabeth Harington.

== Family ==
Her four children were:

- John Markham, who married Eleanor Tyringham, daughter Sir Thomas Tyringham (1580-1636) of Tyringham. After his death she married Thomas Mordaunt son of James, Lord Mordaunt.
- Robert Markham of Sedgebrook, married (1) Rebecca Eyre, (2) Rebecca Hussey.
- Henry Markham (b. 1602).
- Frances Markham (1599–1614).

Bridget Markham's eldest son Robert Markham of Sedgebrook (1597–1667) was a Royalist; a younger son Henry fought for Parliament.

Her daughter Frances or "Frank" Markham (1599–1614) was brought up by the Countess of Bedford, but died at Exton Hall in Rutland in September 1614, two months before her wedding.
