= Allington, Lincolnshire =

Village in the South Kesteven district of Lincolnshire, England

Coordinates: 52.952427°N 0.722981°W

Allington
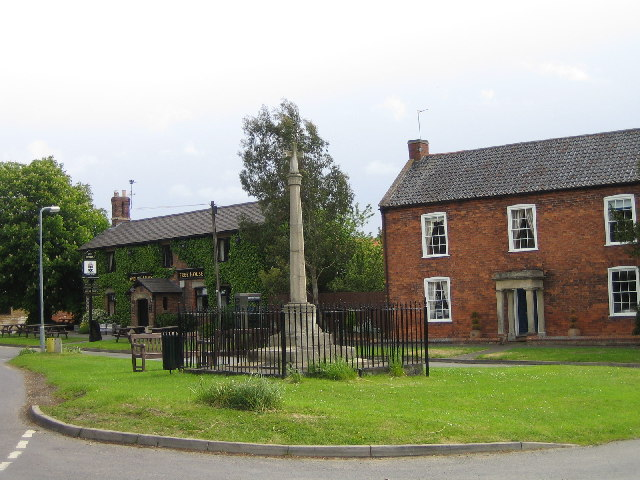
- Village green, Allington

- Location within Lincolnshire
- Population: 878 (Parish, 2021)
- OS grid reference: SK858402
  - London: 100 mi (160 km) S
- Civil parish: Allington
- District: South Kesteven
- Shire county: Lincolnshire
- Region: East Midlands
- Country: England
- Sovereign state: United Kingdom
- Post town: Grantham
- Postcode district: NG32
- Dialling code: 01400
- Police: Lincolnshire
- Fire: Lincolnshire
- Ambulance: East Midlands
- UK Parliament: Grantham and Bourne

Allington is a village and civil parish in the South Kesteven district of Lincolnshire, England. It lies 3 miles (5 km) north-west of Grantham, its post town. At the 2021 census, the parish had a population of 878. It is a "Thankful Village."

== History ==
Some evidence has been found of settlement in the Neolithic period. Roman artefacts have also been found nearby.

The Domesday Book of 1086 records three estates or manors at a vill listed as both Adelinctune and Adelingetone in the wapentake of Winnibriggs. The vill had a total of 73 households at that time, and two of the manors had churches. Allington came to be divided for parochial purposes into West Allington and East Allington. West Allington was a parish, with its parish church dedicated to Holy Trinity. The current building dates back to about 1150.

East Allington and neighbouring Sedgebrook to the south were anciently chapelries within the parish of West Allington. By 1535, Sedgebrook had become a separate parish, and East Allington became a chapelry within the parish of Sedgebrook. East Allington was served a by a chapel of ease dedicated to St James. Parishes were given various civil functions under the poor laws from the 17th century onwards. The chapelry of East Allington was jointly administered for poor law purposes with the parish of West Allington, rather than with the parish of Sedgebrook to which it belonged for ecclesiastical purposes. As such, Allington became a single civil parish in 1866, when the legal definition of 'parish' was changed to be the areas used for administering the poor laws. The two Allingtons were subsequently also reunited for ecclesiastical purposes in 1872. St James's Church at East Allington, the smaller of the two churches, was subsequently demolished. Although the name of the civil parish is just Allington, the name of ecclesiastical parish is "West Allington with East Allington", reflecting the historic split.

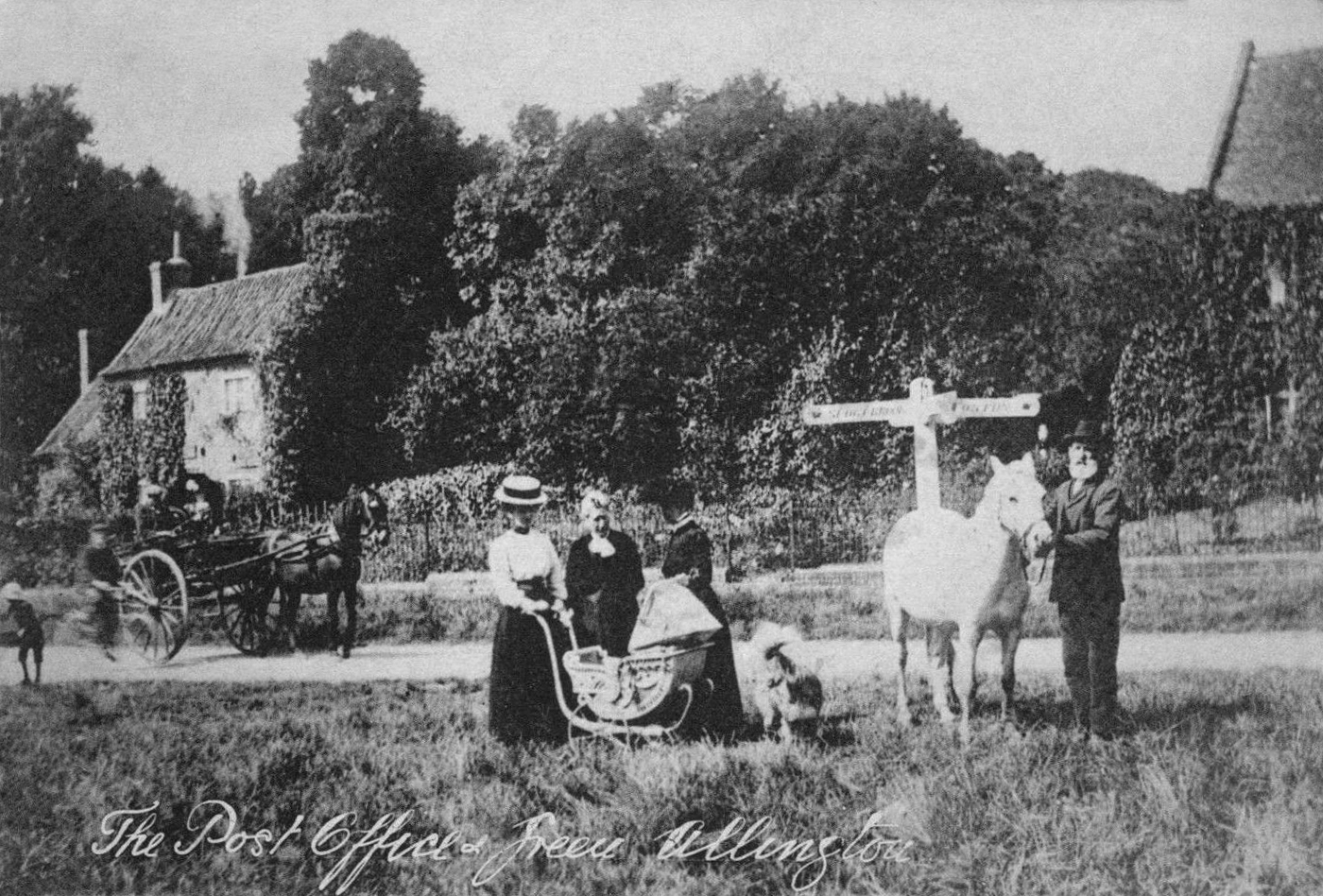
The post office and green in 1908

The poet George Crabbe (1754–1832) became the incumbent of Muston, Leicestershire and West Allington in 1789, remaining until 1792. His Natural History of the Vale of Belvoir was a pioneering study of the district. English Heritage gives the date of Crabbe's Allington incumbency as 1790 to 1814, but he was an absentee for most of the remaining years.

In 1872 White's Directory reported that East Allington had a population of 267, and West Allington 141. The combined area of the two Allingtons was 2,070 acres (8 km^{2}), two-thirds of which was owned by the lord of the manor, John Earle Welby of Allington Hall. Noted was the "farm house... in Elizabethan style" [on Bottesford Road] "said to be the ancient manor house". The village cross is mentioned, as is a "copious" chalybeate spring called 'Saltwell' at the south. The ecclesiastical parish of Holy Trinity Church in West Allington was a rectory in the gift of the Lord Chancellor; the incumbent, in lieu of tithes, received 220 acres (0.89 km^{2}) of glebe – an area of land used to support a parish priest – and a rectory house built in 1870 for £1,250. It was then reported that St James's Church at East Allington had been restored in 1855, and had 167 acres (0.68 km^{2}) of glebe land. The feast day for both West Allington and East Allington was on Old Michaelmas Day. A National School had been built in 1848 by the lord of the manor, and in 1858 a Primitive Methodist chapel was built for £250. Professions and trades listed in 1872 for West Allingon were the parish rector, a tailor, two joiners & undertakers, and four farmers, two of whom were also graziers. Listed for East Allington were a schoolmistress, a shopkeeper, a mason who was also a bricklayer and contractor, a brewer, the licensed victualler of the Welby Arms who was also a farmer and grazier, and five further farmers, one of whom was also a coal & lime merchant, two a grazier, and another a grazier and butcher.

The Welby family was associated with the village from the 18th century onwards until the estate was sold after the Second World War.

During the Second World War, Allington Hall became a military hospital. A prisoner-of-war camp in the village held German and later Italian inmates. The estate was subsequently dispersed in 1947.

== Amenities ==
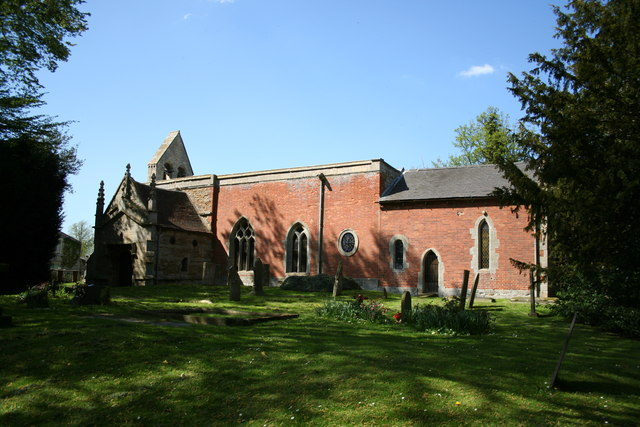
Holy Trinity Church

Holy Trinity Anglican Church belongs to the Saxonwell Group of Churches. It is one of four churches in the group, the others being at Long Bennington, Foston and Sedgebrook.

Allington with Sedgebrook Church of England Primary School is in Marston Lane, Allington. The first school in the village was established on the village green in 1847. The school was moved to its present site in 1906. It was extended in 2003–04.

The village contains the Welby Arms public house, The Old Manor House hotel, a building dating to about 1660, a doctors' surgery, and a 1929-built village hall.

The playing field at Allington is a sports facility owned by the parish council. The Viking Way, Sewstern Lane, passed through the village until 1997, but was diverted to follow a road bridge over the A1.

Local community activities include morris dancing, gardening, a preschool and a women's institute.

There are CallConnect bus services to Grantham. The nearest railway stations are at Bottesford 3 miles (5 km) to the west, and Grantham 5 miles (8 km) to the south-east.
