= Willoughby Waterleys =

Village in Leicestershire, England

Coordinates: 52.526°N 1.154°W

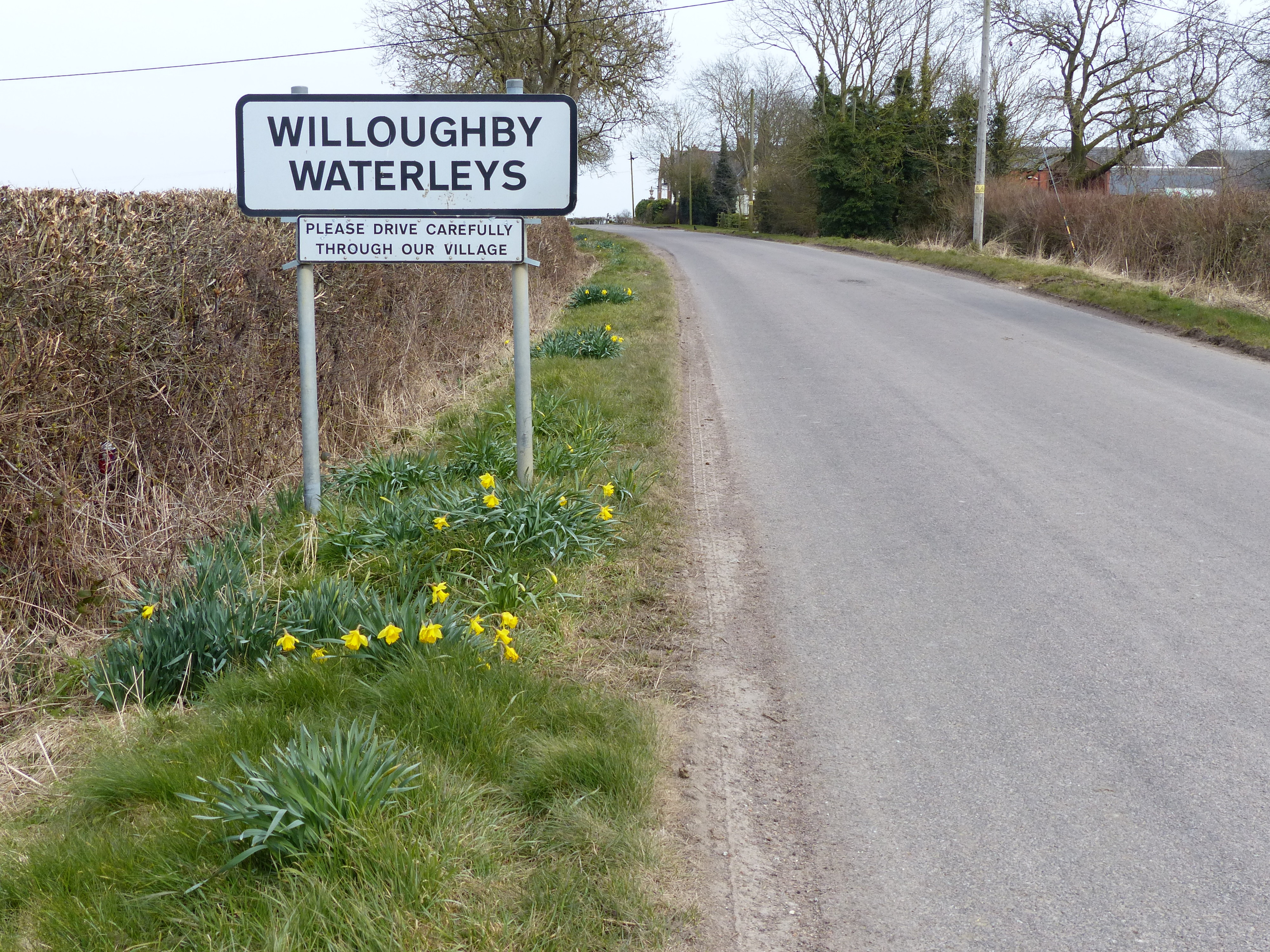
- Welcome place name sign for Willoughby Waterleys

- Location within Leicestershire
- Population: 327
- Civil parish: Willoughby Waterleys
- District: Harborough
- Shire county: Leicestershire
- Region: East Midlands
- Country: England
- Sovereign state: United Kingdom
- Post town: LEICESTER
- Postcode district: LE8
- Police: Leicestershire
- Fire: Leicestershire
- Ambulance: East Midlands
- UK Parliament: South Leicestershire

Willoughby Waterleys (formerly known as Willoughby Waterless) is a small village and civil parish in the Harborough district of Leicestershire, England. It is situated near the A426 Leicester–to–Lutterworth road. Nearby villages are Ashby Magna, Peatling Magna and Countesthorpe. Main Street is the basis of the village running north to south, there have been some new developments such as bungalows and large detached houses however many farms still remain in the parish.

Between 1870 and 1872 John Marius Wilson of the Imperial Gazetteer described Willoughby Waterleys as "a parish, with a village, in Lutterworth district, Leicester; 1¾ mile ESE of Broughton-Astley r. station, and 6 NNE of Lutterworth".

It has a population of 327 according to the 2011 census.

== History ==
The name Willoughby Waterleys was formerly Willoughby Waterless, with the two elements meaning "willow-tree farm/settlement" and "water meadows". It was an ancient parish of Leicestershire, becoming a modern civil parish in July 1837 with the civil registration. The Anglican parish church, St Mary's, was built in the Norman period, and its registers date back to 1559. Restored in 1875, the church seats 300 people.

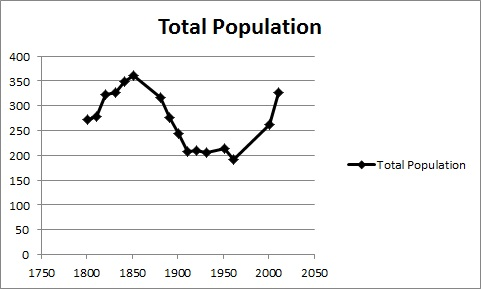
Waterleys Population time series, as reported by the Census of Population, 1801–2011

The village is mentioned in the Domesday Book as being in the area of Guthlaxton, with a total population of "22 households (quite large)", "12 meadow acres" and "5 ploughlands with 3 men plough teams". Notably, the entry mentions two lords of the area: Esbiorn of Oadby in 1066 and Countess Judith in 1086.

In 2000 Willoughby was transferred and the boundary changed from Market Harborough registration district to the Leicestershire district, alongside other parishes such as Ashby Magna, Peatling Magna, Arnesby and Skeffington.

The earliest census records of Willoughby Waterleys date back to 1801, when the total population was 272. The population reached its peak in 1851 with 361 people and hit an all-time low in 1961 with 191. Population gradually dropped in the late 1800s and into the beginning of the 1900s but increased in the modern census collections (2001/2011). In 1881 the highest proportion of over-20-year-old male workers in one named sector was 57% in "Agriculture"; however, in 2011, with more categories of work titles, the spread of jobs was larger, with 26.3% in "Managers, Directors and Senior Officials", 25.3% in "Professional Occupations" and 25.3% in "Skilled Trades Occupations", with no people listed under farming or agriculture.

In 1881 women in Willoughby were mostly likely to be employed as "Workers in Dress" (40.48%); however, in the 2011 census the majority were in "Administrative and secretarial jobs".

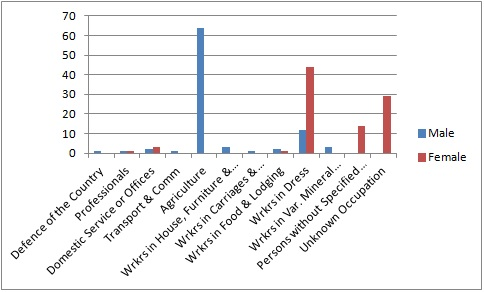
Occupation Structure of the Parish of Willoughby Waterleys from the 1881 Census from 24 Occupation Orders, both sex

== Housing and schools ==
Willoughby Waterleys is in the Peatling district ward, in the county ward of Bruntingthorpe. The parish is described by the Office for National Statistics as a "small town surrounded by inhabited countryside". The typical housing types are mixed, detached, flats, semi-detached and terraced housing, which range from owner occupied to private rental ownership. Property prices range from below average to very high. The average asking price in Willoughby Waterleys for houses is £524,998, according to Zoopla and their "Zed-Index"; the average property value "based on current Zoopla Estimates" is £452,507.

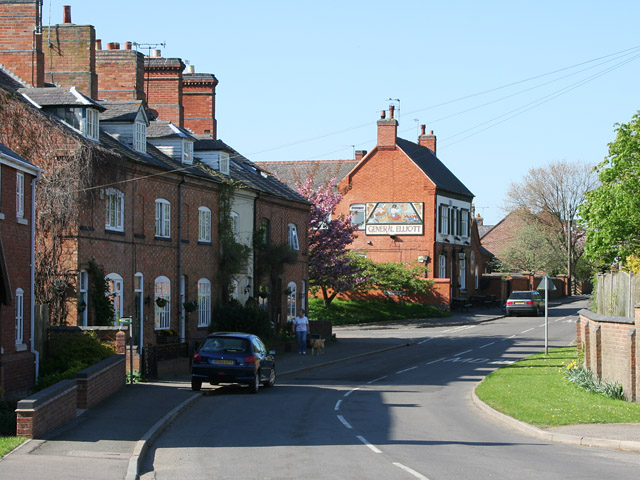
Main Street, Willoughby Waterleys, Leicestershire - geograph.org.uk - 164758

The nearest school to the parish is Greenfield Primary School, which is three miles by car in the nearby area of Countesthorpe. It is a community school for ages 4–11 with a total number of pupils of 490 from September 2013 to July 2014. An Ofsted report in April 2010 rated the school as 'Good'.

== Travel ==
The nearest train station is South Wigston, which is a 5.0-mile drive from the village centre. Other nearby stations are Narborough (5.1 mile drive) and Leicester (8.5 mile drive). The village is "8.5 miles south of Leicester city, 6 miles north-east of Lutterworth and about 2.5 miles south of Countesthorpe". To travel to the parish by car, one takes the A426 southwards out of Leicester city, travels through Blaby and, after crossing the M1, takes a left (east) and follows the road for one mile to reach the village. There are a total of 255 cars and vans in the area. Out of a total of 124 households, 4% have no car/van available, 21.8% own one car/van per household and the largest proportion own two cars/vans for their household. The remaining proportion have the availability of three cars/vans (8.9%), and a notable proportion of 12.1% have four or more cars/vans per household. The closest bus services, run by Beaver Bus from nearby Countesthorpe to Lutterworth, are designated 005X and the 007X. Both run only during school or college terms and link in time with the start and finish of schools. These times can vary, and "it is possible that the service is only available to pupils from the relevant school".

== Places of interest ==
- Church of St Mary The building is partly 13th century and was redone in the 14th century with the latest restoration in 1875. It is made up of a west tower, nave, chapel, and chancel. The north aisle and vestry were also added later on. It is also home to a small original graveyard and a new cemetery to the south east of the church. St Mary's has remains of a mediaeval painting on the north door and has been given a grant aided place of worship by English Heritage.
- Willoughby Waterleys Village Hall Situated on Main Street the village hall was formerly a National School built in 1846 originally to hold 51 children, but now can hold up to 100 people with modern facilities such as a kitchen, toilets, outdoor play area and car park. It is available for hire weekday evenings and morning to evening at weekends. It became a Grade II Listed Building on 29 April 1986 and remains one of the 13 British Listed Buildings in the parish.

== Sport ==
Willoughby Waterleys Cricket Club was an amateur cricket club established in 1977. Their ground was located on the Dunton Bassett Cricket Club ground. They had a friendly XI team that played fixtures throughout the county and would regularly tour each season.
