= Sedgebrook =

Village and civil parish in the South Kesteven district of Lincolnshire, England

Coordinates: 52.932904°N 0.728037°W

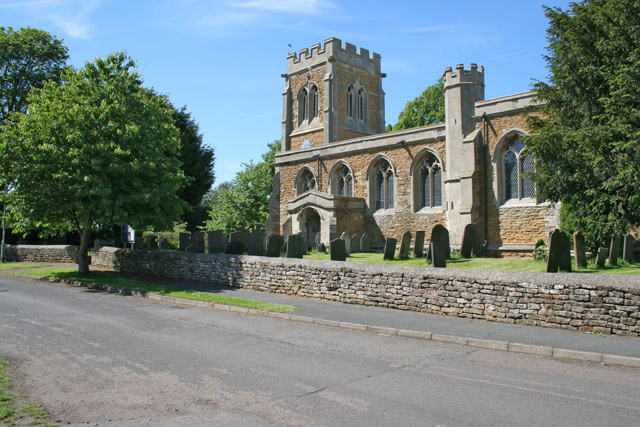
- St Lawrence's Church, Sedgebrook

- Location within Lincolnshire
- Area: 0.15 sq mi (0.39 km^{2})
- Population: 355 (2011)
  - Density: 2,367/sq mi (914/km^{2})
- OS grid reference: SK856380
  - London: 100 mi (160 km) SSE
- District: South Kesteven
- Shire county: Lincolnshire
- Region: East Midlands
- Country: England
- Sovereign state: United Kingdom
- Post town: GRANTHAM
- Postcode district: NG32
- Dialling code: 01949
- Police: Lincolnshire
- Fire: Lincolnshire
- Ambulance: East Midlands
- UK Parliament: Grantham and Bourne

Sedgebrook is an English village and civil parish in the South Kesteven district of Lincolnshire. It lies on the A52 road, 6 miles (9.7 km) west of Grantham. Its population, given as 372 in 2001, fell by the 2011 census to 355, and was estimated to be 347 in 2019.

== Heritage ==
Sedgebrook is mentioned in the 1086 Domesday Book as Sechebroc in the wapentake of Winnibriggs. The name Robert Malet and three mills are noted. Sechebroc means "Brook where sedge grows", from OE secg "sedge" and brôc "a brook"

The parish church of St Lawrence is a largely 15th-century building with an early 13th-century north arcade and a 14th-century chancel arch. A pamphlet history of the church appeared in 1980 and was republished in 1990. The church is the only Grade I listed building in the village. Sedgebrook Manor House is Grade II* listed, and three other houses and three architectural features are Grade II. The church shares a priest with Foston, West Allington and Long Bennington.

The Grantham Canal passes 1.5 miles (2.4 km) south-west of the village. It opened in 1797 but closed in 1936. A voluntary society formed in 1969 has restored parts of the canal for recreational use. The towpaths form a long-distance walk, as does the Viking Way, passing about 0.5 miles (0.8 km) to the west of the village, known here as Sewstern Lane.

Newbo Abbey was sited between Sedgebrook and Barrowby in the 12th century.

The wartime RAF Bottesford airfield lies 3 miles (4.8 km) north-west of the village.

=== Census information ===
- 1086 – 27 villagers. 5 smallholders.
- 1841 – 249 people listed, average age 25, youngest 1 month, oldest 75, occupations (occurrences):

Farm Labourer (23), Servant (15), Farmer (8), Cottager (5), Shoemaker (2), Carpenter (2), Grocer (2), Gardener (2), Publican (1) (The Red Cow?) Dean of Lincoln (1) (George Gordon), Farmer / Miller (1)

- 1851 – 279 people listed, average age 26, youngest under 1 month, oldest 87, occupations:

Farm Labourer (40), Scholar (34), Servant (22), Farmer (5), Gardener (4), Housemaid (3), Shepherd (3), Carpenter (2), Pauper (2), Cottager (2), Cook (2), Carrier (2), Housekeeper (2), Cordwainer (2), Farmer's Boy (2), Lace Runner (2), Publican (1), Servant (out of place) (1), Scholar at home (1), Drover of Cattle (1), Visitor (1), In receipt of yearly income from sons (1), Railway Porter (1), Kitchen maid to Revd T. Parsy ? (1), Seamstress (1), Labourer in Plantation (1), Shopkeeper (1), Labourer on roads (1), Rector (1), Farmer / Miller (1), Railway Clerk (Greenwich Pensioner) (1), Cadger ? (1), Foreman on roads (1), Schoolmaster B.A. (1), Schoolmistress (1), Nursemaid (1), Game Keeper (1), Nursery Governess (1), Dress Maker (1), Apprentice to Cabinet Maker (1), Tea Dealer (1), Plate Layer (1), Farm Labourer (Chelsea Pensioner) (1), Plough Boy (2), Dressmaker (1), Grocer (1), Miller (1), Nurse (1)

- 1861 – 268 people listed, average age 27, youngest 1 month, oldest 83, occupations (occurrences):

Scholar (55), Agricultural Labourer (17), Labourer's Wife (16), Cottager's Wife (10), Cottager (9), Carter (7), House Servant (6), Housekeeper (5), Field Boy (4), Agricul Labourer (4), Dress Maker (4), Groom (3), Nursemaid (3), Pauper (3), Dairy Maid (3), Assists her mother (2), Machine Worker (2), Assists mother (2), Assists in the cottage (2), Bailiff's Wife (2), Housemaid (2), Journeyman Shoemaker (2), Schoolmaster (2), Day boy to farmer (2), Farmer's wife (2), Butcher (1), Plate Layer's Wife (1), Miller (1), Cottager & Carrier (1), Shepherds Wife (1), Cottager & Sub Post Master (1), Labpourer's Wife (1), Cottager of 5 acres & Agricultural Labourer (1), Clerk to a Coal Merchant (1), Cottager of 8 acres (1), Cordwainer's Wife (1), Assists his father (1), Wheelwright & Joiner (1), Curate of Muston Leicests. M.A. Cambridge (1), Carter's wife (1), Agr Labourer (1), Manages a Cottage (1), Apprentice to Shoemaker (1), Miller & Farmer 305 acres employing 6 labourers & 4 boys (1), Assists mother in the Cottage (1), Coal Merchant (1), Dressmaker (1), Cordwainer (1), Engineer Plate Layer (1), Shepherd (1), Farm Bailiff (1), Station Master (1), Farmer of 196 acres empl 2 labourers & 1 boy (1), House Servt (1), Farmer of 487 acres emp 11 men & 5 boys (1), Assists at home (1), Farmer of 640 acres employing 18 men & 8 boys (1), Charwoman (1), Farmer's Son (1), Char-woman (1), Wife to above (1), Manages Cottage (1), Farmer 327 acres employ 8 labourers & 2 boys (1), Miller & Baker (1), Assistant Housekeeper (1), Miller's Wife (1), Gamekeeper (1), Officiating Minister in charge of the Parish of East Allington C Lincoln B.A. Trinity Coll of Dublin (1), Gamekeeper's Wife (1), Plate Layer (1), Gardener (1), Publican & Tea Dealer (1), Gardener's Wife (1), Scholar at home (1), Glover (1), Schoolmistress (1), Governess (1), Shepherd & Ag Lab (1), Grocer, Ag Lab, & Indoor & outdoor Servant (1), Shoemaker (1), Brickmaker (1), Station Master's Wife (1), House Boy (1), Agr Lab (1), Brickmaker's Wife (1), Farming Bailiff (1)

=== Sedgebrook Manor House ===
The Manor House is sometimes known as Sedgebrook Hall. The earliest known owners were the Markhams in the 15th century.

==== Owners ====
- c. 1400 – John Markham
- 1604–1609 – Bridget Markham, widow of Sir Anthony Markham
- 1716 – Sir John Thorold in much of the 19th century, although the family did not occupy it. It was tenanted as a dairy farmhouse.
- 1842 – John and James Wing
- 1851 – James Webb Wing
- 1856 – William Monks
- 1868 – George William Robinson
- 1885 – George Kemp
- 1900 – Edward Baker
- 1905 – William Baker
- 1913 – Samuel Yarrad
- 1928 – Duncan Douglas Stuart Carter
- 1931 – Colonel G. C. Buxton, who rented it to Lady Mountgarrett during the Second World War
- 1931 – Also listed is a Miss Ellen Carter.
- late 1950s – Mr and Mrs Beddington
- 1968–present – Lady Caroline Stuart (now Lady Ogilvy)

==== Events ====
- 1922 – The estate was offered for sale, then withdrawn.
- 1954 – Announcement of the sale of Sedgebrook Manor, the residence of Col. G. C. Buxton – a small period house in 34 acres.
- In 1851 there was a public house in the village called the Red Cow.

== Governance ==
Sedgebrook is in the Sleaford and North Hykeham constituency and currently represented in the House of Commons by Dr Caroline Johnson, who is a member of the Conservative Party.

== Geography ==
The village lies in the north of the Vale of Belvoir, beside Foston Beck, a tributary of the River Witham. Adjacent villages are Barrowby, 2 miles (3.2 km) south-east; Muston, 1.75 miles (2.8 km) west; Bottesford, 3.25 miles (5.2 km) west-north-west; and Allington, 1.5 miles (2.4 km) north. The village is overlooked by Belvoir Castle, 3.5 miles to the south-west.

== Transport ==
The stretch of the A52 trunk road between Grantham and Nottingham bypasses the village. The nearest junction on the A1 between Grantham and Newark is at Foston, 3 miles (4.8 km) to the north.

The Nottingham to Grantham railway line passes close to the village, and crosses Allington Road. Sedgebrook railway station closed in 1956. The nearest station today is at Bottesford, 3.3 miles (5.3 km) away, which has services to Nottingham, Grantham and Skegness.

The village is served by two bus routes, one between Grantham and Radcliffe on Trent, the other between Grantham and Bitchfield.

== Education ==
Sedgebrook had its own primary school up until 1981, when the building was closed and the school amalgamated with that of Allington.

Sedgebrook also had at one time a grammar school. This was erected in 1882, and in 1908 there were 75 boys attending. By 1913 it was a secondary school for the surrounding area. It was absorbed into The King's School, Grantham, probably in 1919.
