= Stanley, Nottinghamshire =

Hamlet in Nottinghamshire, England

Coordinates: 53.1550°N 1.3114°W

Stanley
- Hamlet
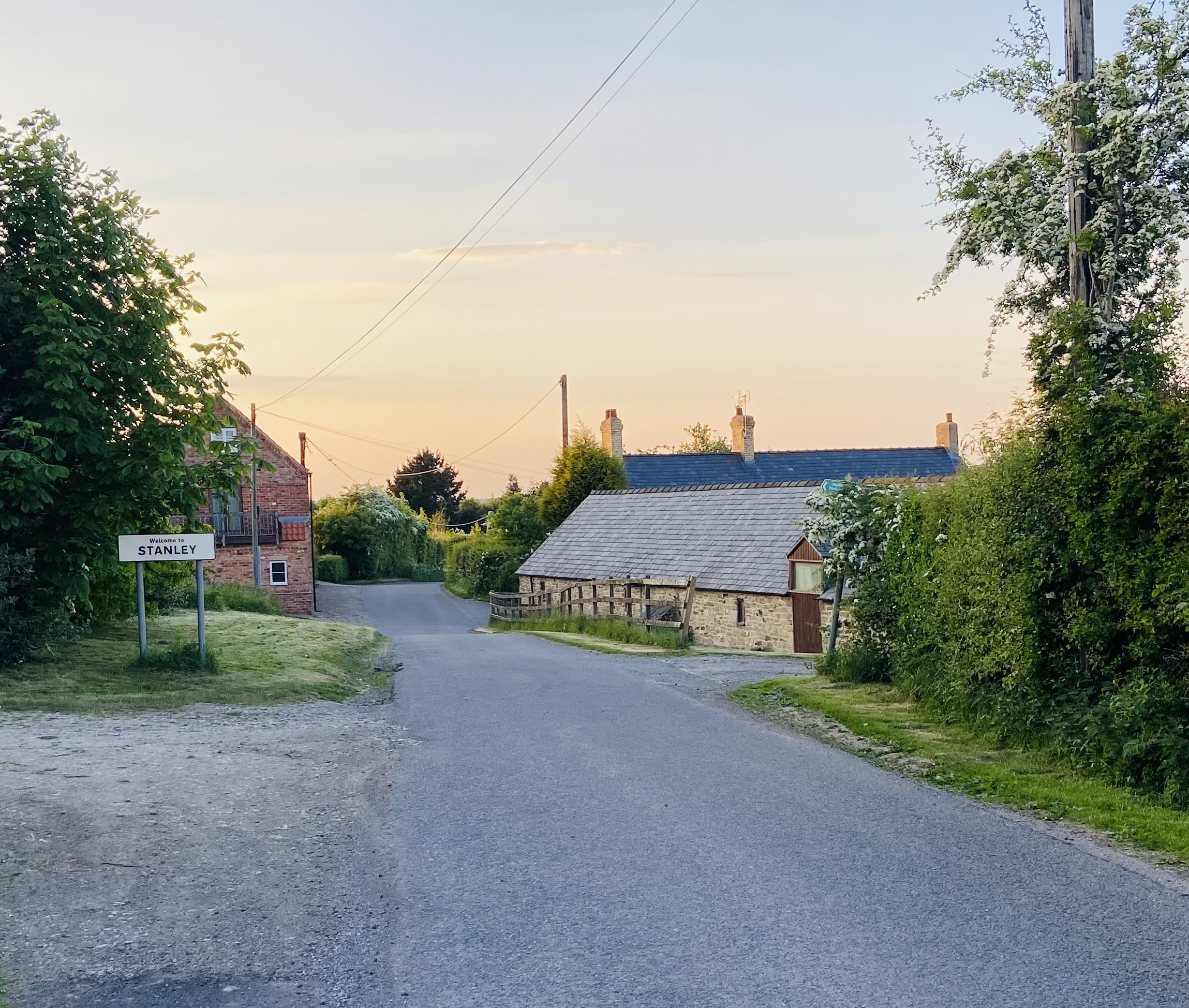
- Shepherds Lane

- Location within Nottinghamshire
- District: Ashfield
- Shire county: Nottinghamshire
- Region: East Midlands
- Country: England
- Sovereign state: United Kingdom
- Post town: Sutton-in-Ashfield
- Postcode district: NG17
- Dialling code: 01773
- Police: Nottinghamshire
- Fire: Nottinghamshire
- Ambulance: East Midlands
- UK Parliament: Ashfield

Stanley is a hamlet in the Ashfield District of Nottinghamshire England. It lies north of Sutton-in-Ashfield. It is close to the village of Teversal and the boundary with Derbyshire, within the vicinity of Hardwick Hall.

== Toponymy ==
Stanley has been known by different names including Stanlega in 1168, Stanleg in 1240, Stanley in 1262, Staneleye in 1301, and Standley in 1580 meaning 'Stony Clearing or wood'.

== History ==
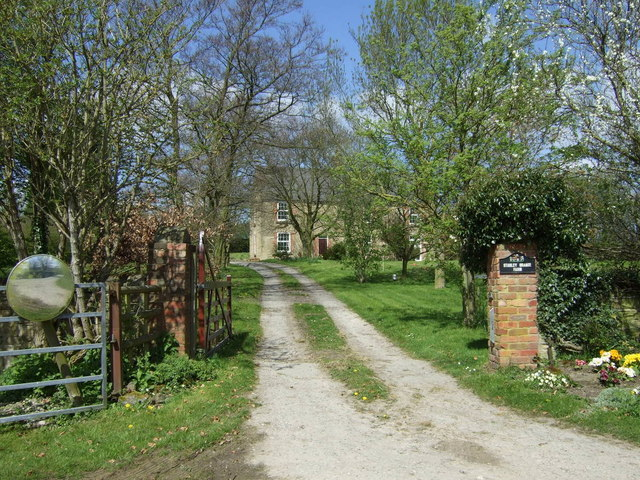
Stanley Grange Farm

William Barry, Lord of Teversal was granted by Beauchief Abbey, Sheffield two tofts and crofts in 1190 to 1225 in Stanley. The land given meant that there was sufficient land for a farm. This area is now known as Stanley Grange Farm.

In 1525 Thomas North owned Stanley Grange Farm, where he kept his sheep. The grange was then passed to William Bollas in 1537. William was a receiver of the government dissolved monasteries. He later owned Felley Priory as part of Henry VIII Dissolution of the Monasteries.
