= St Katherine's Church, Teversal =

Coordinates: 53.1520°N 1.2786°W

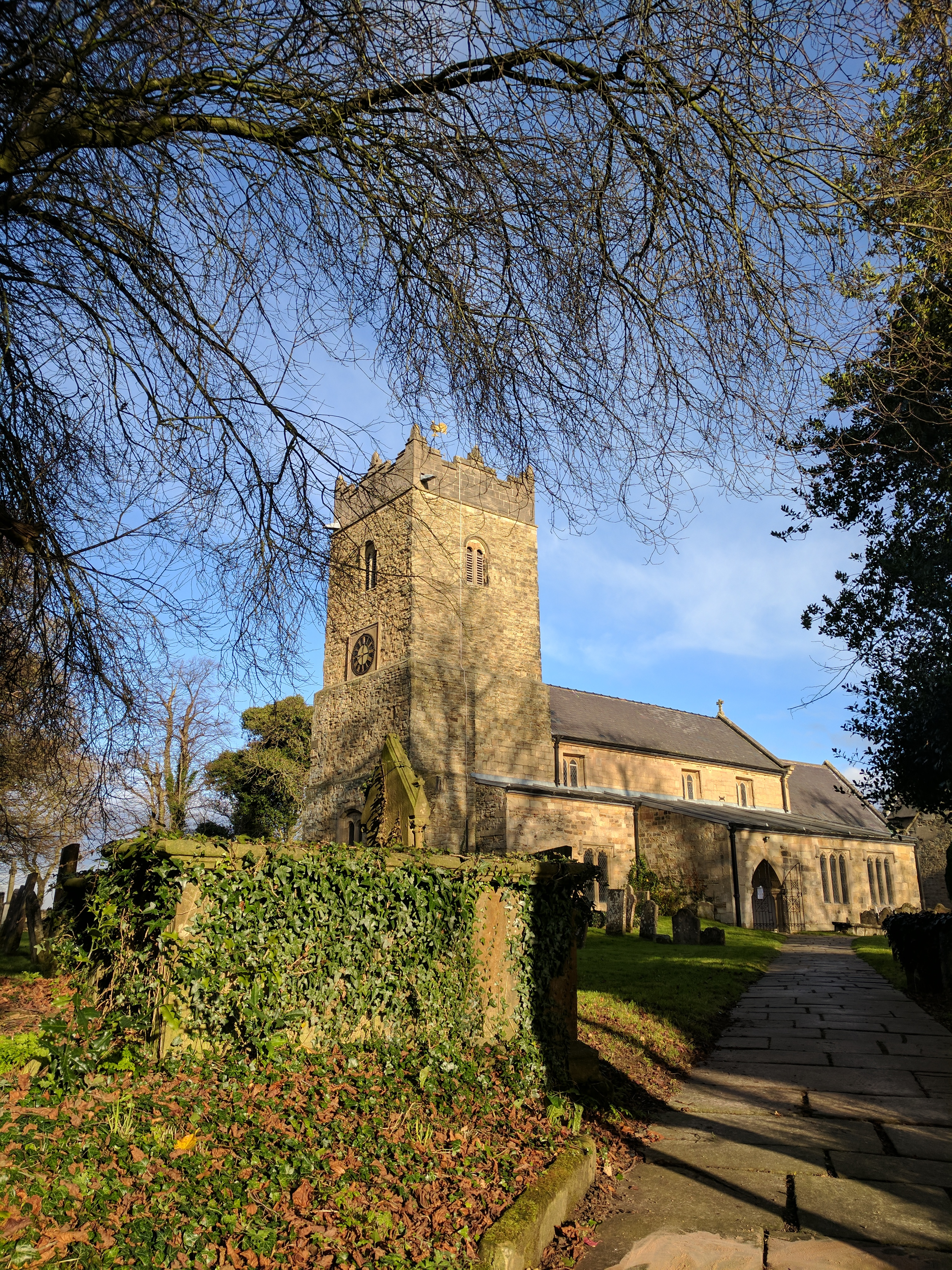
- St Katherine's Church, Teversal

- Location in Nottinghamshire
- OS grid reference: SK 48339 61902
- Location: Buttery Lane, Teversal, Nottinghamshire
- Country: England
- Denomination: Church of England
- Churchmanship: Broad Church
- Website: http://www.skegbyparish.org.uk/

History
- Status: Parish church
- Dedication: St. Catherine

Architecture
- Functional status: Active

Listed Building – Grade I
- Official name: St Katherine’s Church, Teversal
- Designated: 12 October 1988
- Reference no.: 1234886
- Architectural type: Church
- Style: Gothic

Specifications
- Materials: Stone, slate / lead roof

Administration
- Province: York
- Diocese: Southwell and Nottingham
- Archdeaconry: Newark
- Deanery: Newstead
- Parish: Skegby

Clergy
- Vicar: Revd Canon Dr Richard Kellett

St Katherine's Church is on Buttery Lane, Teversal, Nottinghamshire, England. It is an active Church of England parish church in the deanery of Newstead, the Archdeaconry of Newark, and the Southwell and Nottingham diocese. Its benefice has three churches, St Andrew's Church, Skegby, All Saints' Church, Stanton Hill and St Katherine's itself.

The church was built in the 12th and 13th centuries and has an unrestored 17th and 18th century interior. The Molyneux pew is in the south aisle and has a roof supported by barley-sugar columns.

== History ==
The church is medieval and is the family church of the Earl of Carnarvon.

== Bells ==
The third bell is one of the oldest bells in Nottinghamshire dated 1551.

== Monuments ==
There are two early ledger stones, for Roger Greenhalghe (d. 1562) and his wife Anne Babington (d. 1538).

There are various monuments to the Molyneux Baronets

- Sir Francis Molyneux, 2nd Baronet, died 1674, son of Sir John Molyneux, 1st Baronet.
- Sir John Molyneux, died 1691
- Sir John Molyneux, died 1741

== See also ==
- Grade I listed buildings in Nottinghamshire
- Listed buildings in Teversal
