= St Mary's Church, Ashby Magna =

Church in Ashby Magna, Leicestershire

Coordinates: 52°30′34″N 1°10′15″W

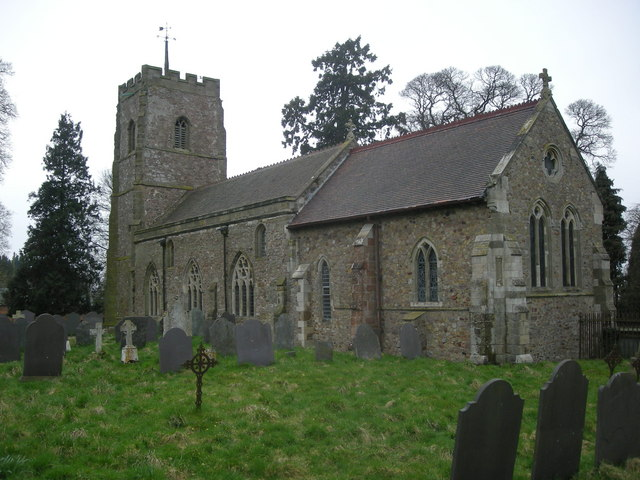
- St Mary's Church, Ashby Magna
- Denomination: Church of England

History
- Dedication: St Mary

Administration
- Diocese: Leicester
- Archdeaconry: Loughborough
- Parish: Ashby Magna, Leicestershire

St Mary's Church is a church in Ashby Magna, Leicestershire. It is a Grade II* listed building. It is part of the Church of England Diocese of Leicester.

Parish enquiries are directed to the Churchwarden through the parish’s official listing on A Church Near You.[¹] In the Church of England, the Churchwarden is a lay officer elected annually by the parish and admitted by the bishop. Under the Churchwardens Measure 2001 and related canons, wardens are responsible for the care of the church building, fabric, and contents, and for representing the laity in parish governance.[²][³] A Church Near You – St Mary’s Ashby Magna parish entry (CofE official directory) 2. Church of England, Churchwardens Measure 2001 (legislation.gov.uk) 3. Church of England Canons, Canon E1: Of Churchwardens (official CofE canon law text)

== Use of Images and Content ==
Text and images relating to St Mary’s Church, Ashby Magna, may be reused in accordance with Wikipedia’s licensing terms (Creative Commons Attribution-ShareAlike 4.0 International).

Where material originates from parish sources, it is released with the permission of the Parochial Church Council (PCC) of Ashby Magna under the same licence. The PCC retains copyright in its original works under the Copyright, Designs and Patents Act 1988, unless explicitly released.

For permissions relating to parish publications or images not released under Creative Commons, enquiries should be directed to the Churchwarden via [*A Church Near You*](https://www.achurchnearyou.com/church/5324/).

== History ==
The church was built by Robert Esseby in c1220. The oldest parts of the church are the arcade and north aisle dating from the 13th century.

The church altogether is made up of a nave, vestry, 14th-century tower, north aisle and chancel. In 1861 the gallery and pews were removed, the font added, and the south windows and nave were restored.

The chancel was restored in 1907 and the floor was raised. Some of the tiles have the City of Cardiff motif on them. The chancel also has an ambry recess on the north wall and a piscina.

== Today ==
The church is currently on Historic England's Heritage at Risk Register as being in a poor state and it has been the subject of heritage crime.
