= Silverhill, Nottinghamshire =

Hill in Nottinghamshire, England

Silverhill
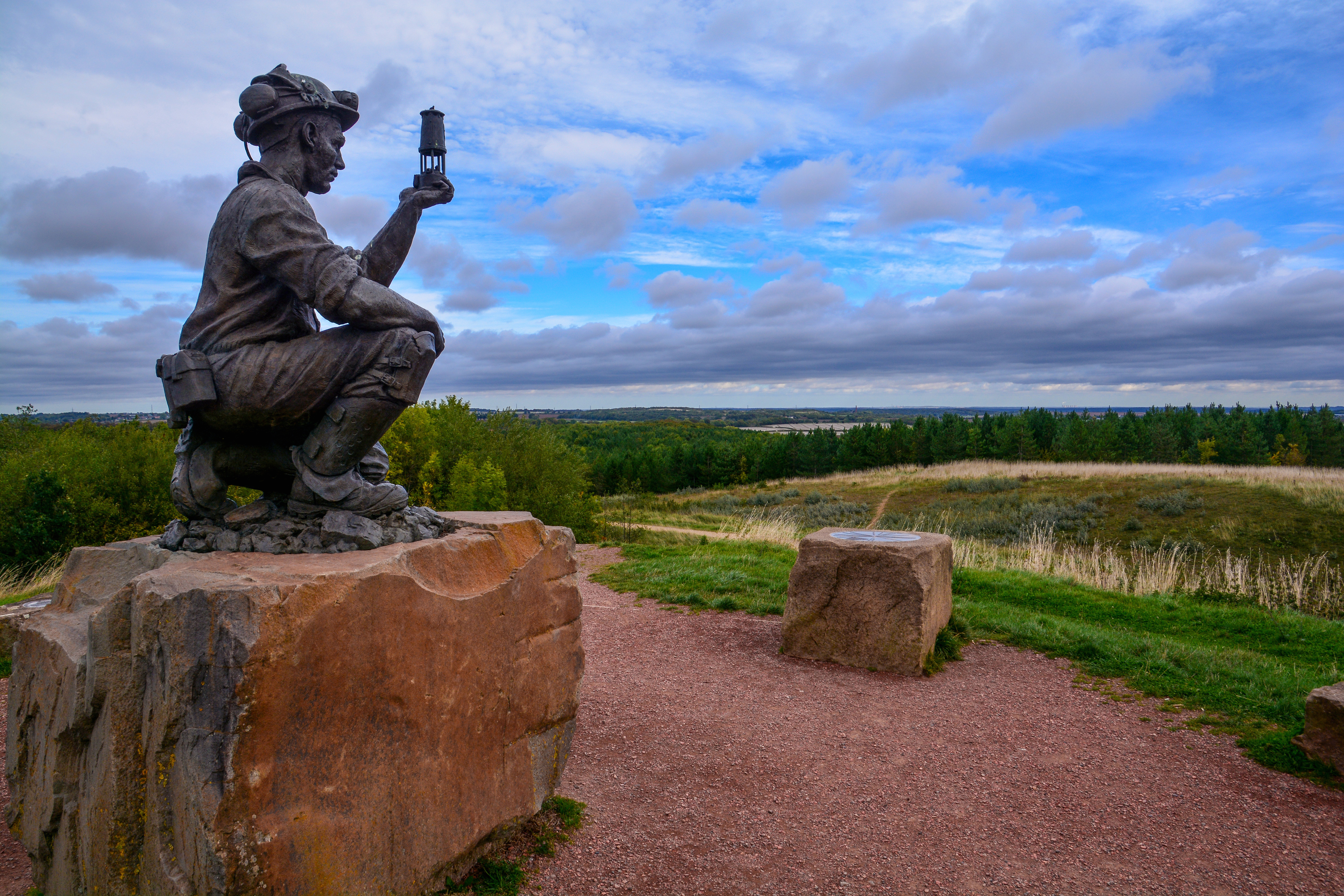
- Testing for Gas statue

Highest point
- Elevation: 204.3 m (670 ft)
- Prominence: 62 m (203 ft)
- Coordinates: 53°09′15″N 1°17′51″W

Geography
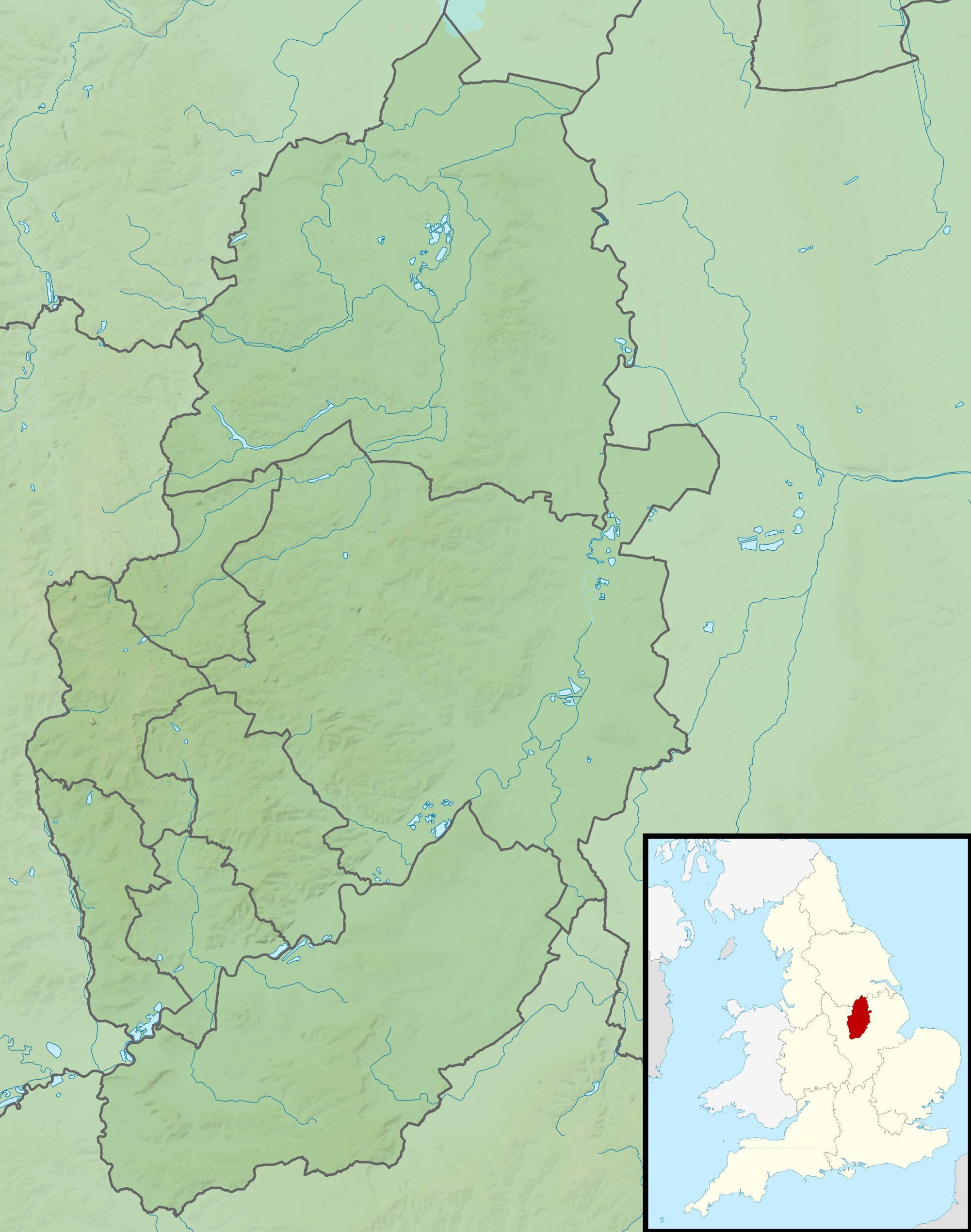
- Location within Nottinghamshire
- Location: Silverhill Lane, Teversal, Sutton-in-Ashfield, NG17 3JJ. Nottinghamshire, England
- OS grid: SK470621

Silverhill is an artificial hill near Teversal in Nottinghamshire, and is one of the highest points in the county at 204.3 metres (670 ft). Originally it was a mine spoil heap on the site of the former Silverhill colliery which closed in the 1990s. It was subsequently landscaped in 2005 by Nottinghamshire County Council, with tree planting, numerous footpaths, and a viewpoint. It is now known as Silverhill Woods, and is one of a number of recreation sites in the area.

== Viewpoint ==
The high point allows for panoramic views over five counties; landmarks such as Lincoln Cathedral and Bolsover Castle can be seen from the summit. The site also overlooks the Elizabethan Hardwick Hall, as well as the more modern M1 motorway. The flat area of the viewpoint was originally laid out with stone blocks, at the ordinal points of the compass. A bronze statue of a kneeling coal miner with a Davy lamp was a later addition, located on a rock plinth in the centre of the viewpoint. The sculpture, called Testing for Gas, was created by artist Antony Dufort as "A tribute to the Miners of the Nottinghamshire coalfields", commemorating coal mining at the 85 Nottinghamshire collieries. Listed on the base are the names of the principal collieries in the county 1819–2005.

== Teversal, Skegby and Silverhill trails ==
The Silverhill Woods lead into multi-user trails, many of which incorporate the track beds of disused railway lines which once served the various local collieries.

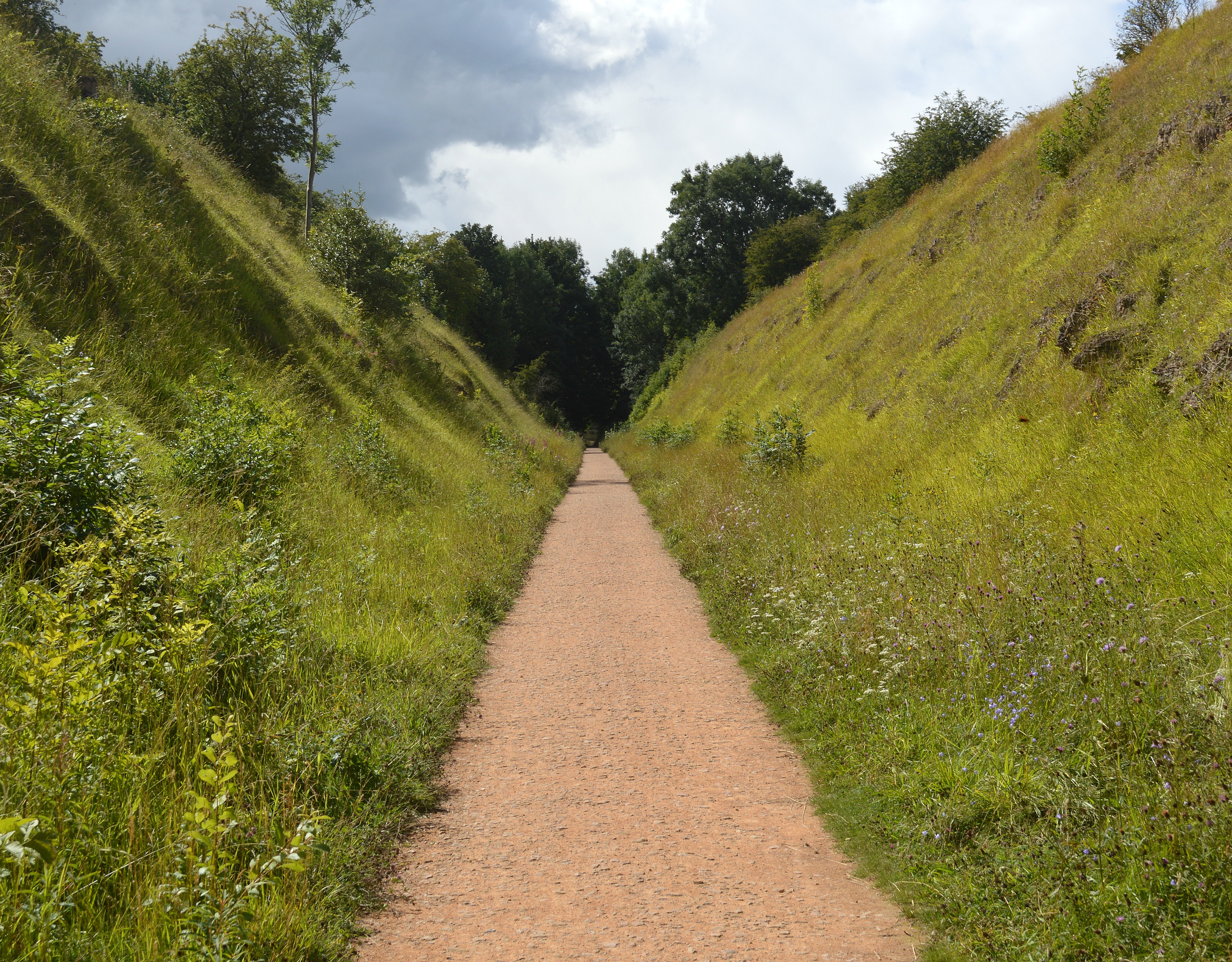
Teversal Trail

== Highest point in Nottinghamshire ==
Silverhill was designed to be the highest point in the county, albeit an artificial one. This was achieved by adding an extra five metres of height during the landscaping work that ended in 2005. The peak was listed with an elevation of 205 metres (673 ft), although the County Surveyors measured it at 204.4 metres (671 ft).

This claim was later disputed, with the suggestion that Strawberry Bank near Huthwaite was the highest natural point, with others highlighting Newtonwood Lane, on the western edge of the county, as another possible contender. In order to ascertain the correct location, a combination of optical levelling and GPS survey of the three points was carried out in 2010. The height for Strawberry Bank was measured at 202 metres (663 ft), Silverhill as 204.3 metres (670 ft), and the results showed that Newtonwood Lane was the highest point at 205 metres (673 ft).

Strawberry Bank does have its own plaque and viewpoint declaring it as highest natural point in the county. The site at Newtonwood Lane, although unmarked at a location on the edge of a service reservoir, is also considered to be natural and is now the county top.

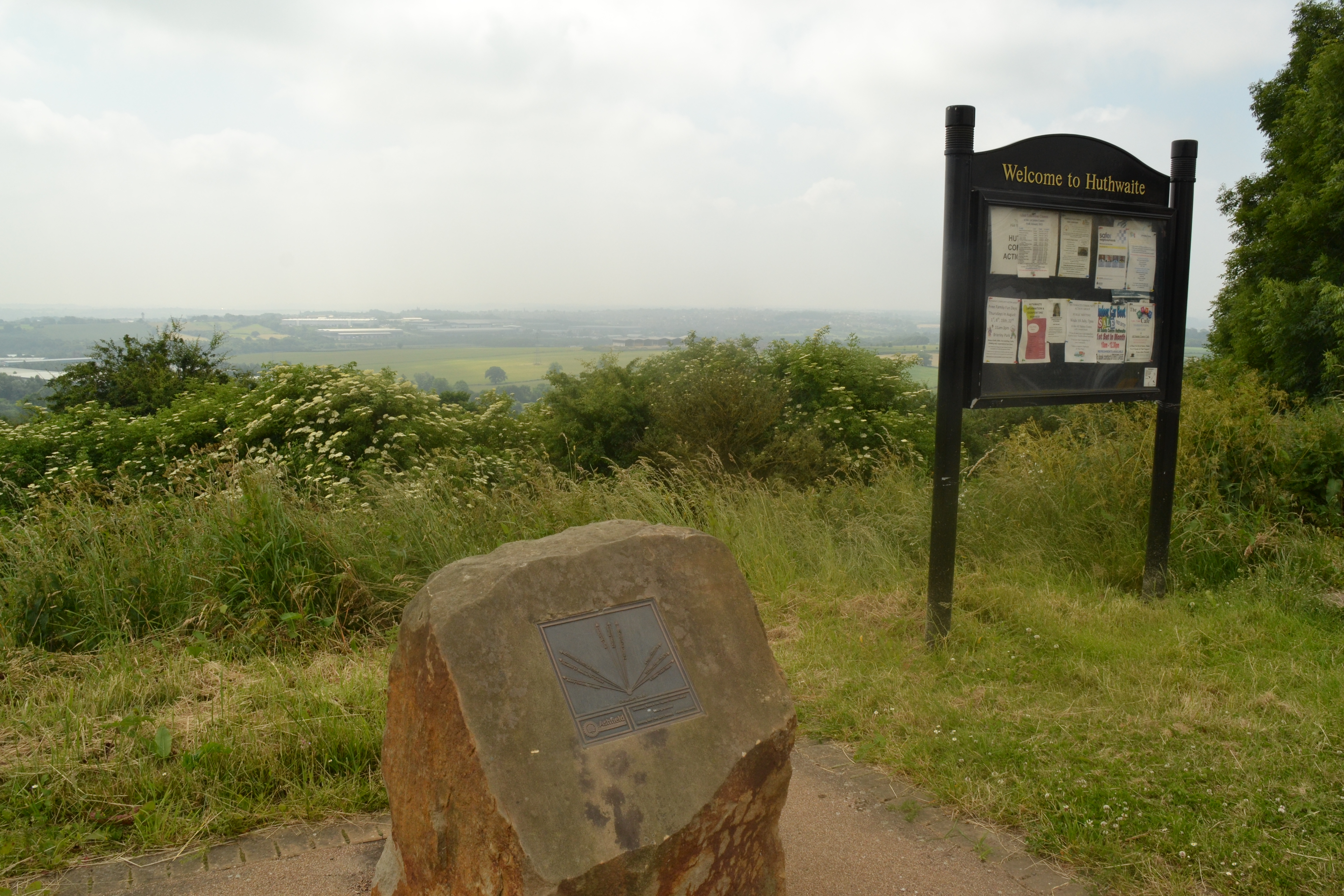
Viewpoint and plaque at Strawberry Bank SK462597

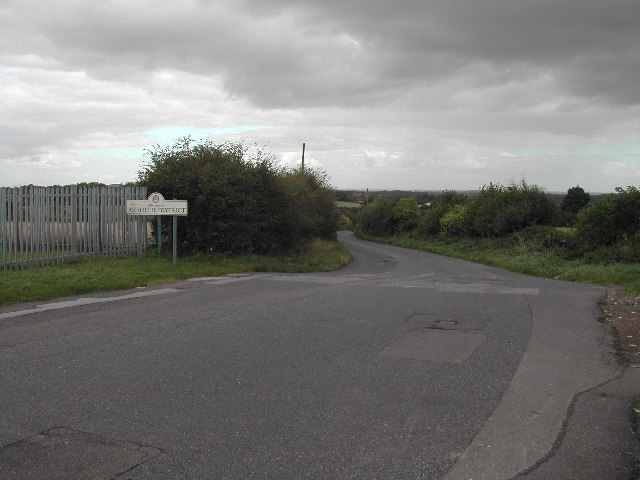
Newtonwood Lane, near Whiteborough SK456606
