= Listed buildings in Teversal =

Teversal is a village in the Ashfield district of Nottinghamshire, England. The village contains ten listed buildings that are recorded in the National Heritage List for England. Of these, one is listed at Grade I, the highest of the three grades, and the others are at Grade II, the lowest grade. The most important listed building is a church, and all the others are houses and associated structures.

== Key ==
Grade	Criteria
I	Buildings of exceptional interest, sometimes considered to be internationally important
II	Buildings of national importance and special interest

== Buildings ==
Name and location	Photograph	Date	Notes	Grade
St Katherine's Church; 53.15209°N 1.27865°W		12th century	The church has been altered and extended through the centuries, including a Victorian restoration in 1889. It is built in stone and consists of a nave with a clerestory, north and south aisles, a chancel, a vestry, and a west tower. The tower has three stages, with string courses, a two-light west window in the bottom stage, the top stage contains a clock face on the west side and two-light bell openings, and above is a stepped embattled parapet with an elaborate weathercock. The porch is incorporated in the south aisle, and the south doorway is Norman.	I
Teversal Manor; 53.15130°N 1.27927°W		16th century	A small country house that was remodelled in 1767, and again in 1896 by Macvicar Anderson. It is in stone on a chamfered plinth, with an eaves band, and slate roofs with coped gables, kneelers and ball finials. There are two storeys and attics, and on the entrance front is a two-storey porch with a four-centred archway. The garden front has seven irregular bays and four gables. Most of the windows are mullioned with hood moulds. The kitchen wing to the east contains the oldest sections of the house.	II
Garages northeast of Teversal Manor; 53.15166°N 1.27902°W		17th century	The outbuilding, later used for other purposes, is in stone and has a pantile roof with coped gables and kneelers. There are two storeys and four bays. On the front is a round-headed doorway, and the windows are mullioned.	II
Terrace Gardens, Teversal Manor; 53.15027°N 1.27954°W	—	Late 17th century	To the south of the house are three rectangular terraced gardens. The surrounding walls are in stone, and between the terraces are flights of steps. The bottom terrace has central square gate piers with moulded caps and ball finials on ogee bases.	II
The Old Rectory and wall 53.15212°N 1.27810°W		Late 17th century	The rectory, later a private house, is in stone on a chamfered plinth, with rusticated quoins, moulded and rebated eaves, and a slate roof with coped gables and kneelers. There are two storeys and attics, and a double-pile and L-shaped plan, with a front range of five bays, and a two-storey two-bay rear wing. Four steps lead to a doorway with a moulded surround and a fanlight. The windows on the front are sashes with architraves, and elsewhere are sash and casement windows. A stone wall with gabled and slab coping encloses the garden to the south of the house, it has two ball finials, and contains three gateways.	II
Coach house and stable north of The Old Rectory; 53.15225°N 1.27824°W	—	Late 17th century	The coach house and stable are in stone with a pantile roof. There are two storeys and three bays, the left bay recessed. On the front are two doorways with segmental heads, and casement windows, one with a mullion.	II
Norwood Lodge; 53.16452°N 1.28754°W		1738	A farmhouse, later a private house, it is in stone, partly rendered, and has pantile roofs with coped gables and kneelers. There are two storeys and attics, two parallel ranges, and three bays. In the centre is a gabled porch with finials and a segmental-arched opening, and above it is a round-headed window and a datestone. In the outer bays are three-light mullioned windows with casements.	II
School House Cottage and Manor Room; 53.15197°N 1.27997°W		Mid 18th century	A coach house and cottage combined into a house, it is in stone, partly rendered, and has a pantile roof with coped gables and kneelers. There is a single storey and attics, and six irregular bays. On the front is a tiled porch, behind which are two doorways and a horizontally-sliding sash window, to the right is a bow window and above it is a dormer. In the east front are a round-headed double doorway with a chamfered surround and a keystone, casement windows, and a dormer.	II
The Privets; 53.15209°N 1.28054°W		Mid 18th century	The house is rendered, and has pantile roofs with coped gables and kneelers. There are two storeys and four bays. On the front is a gabled porch and a doorway with a fanlight, above is a horizontally-sliding sash window, and the other windows are casements.	II
Teversal Farmhouse; 53.15214°N 1.28083°W		Late 18th century	The farmhouse is in stone with a pantile roof. There are two storeys and attics, three bays, and a lower two storey wing on the left. In the centre is a gabled porch, and the windows are a mix of sashes and casements in architraves.	II
