= Foston, Lincolnshire =

Village and a civil parish in the South Kesteven district of Lincolnshire, England

Coordinates: 52.97694°N 0.72170°W

Foston
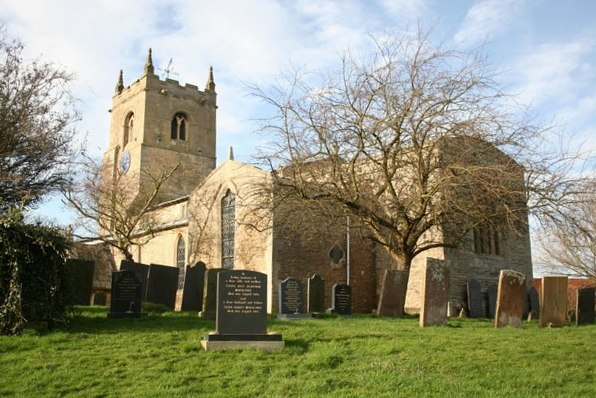
- St Peter's Church, Foston

- Location within Lincolnshire
- Population: 525 (2011)
- OS grid reference: SK859429
  - London: 105 mi (169 km) S
- Civil parish: Foston
- District: South Kesteven
- Shire county: Lincolnshire
- Region: East Midlands
- Country: England
- Sovereign state: United Kingdom
- Post town: GRANTHAM
- Postcode district: NG32
- Police: Lincolnshire
- Fire: Lincolnshire
- Ambulance: East Midlands
- UK Parliament: Grantham and Bourne

Foston is a village and a civil parish in the South Kesteven district of Lincolnshire, England. The village is situated 5 miles (8 km) northwest of Grantham. The A1 road runs through the parish and borders the south of the village. The population of the civil parish at the 2011 census was 525.

== History ==
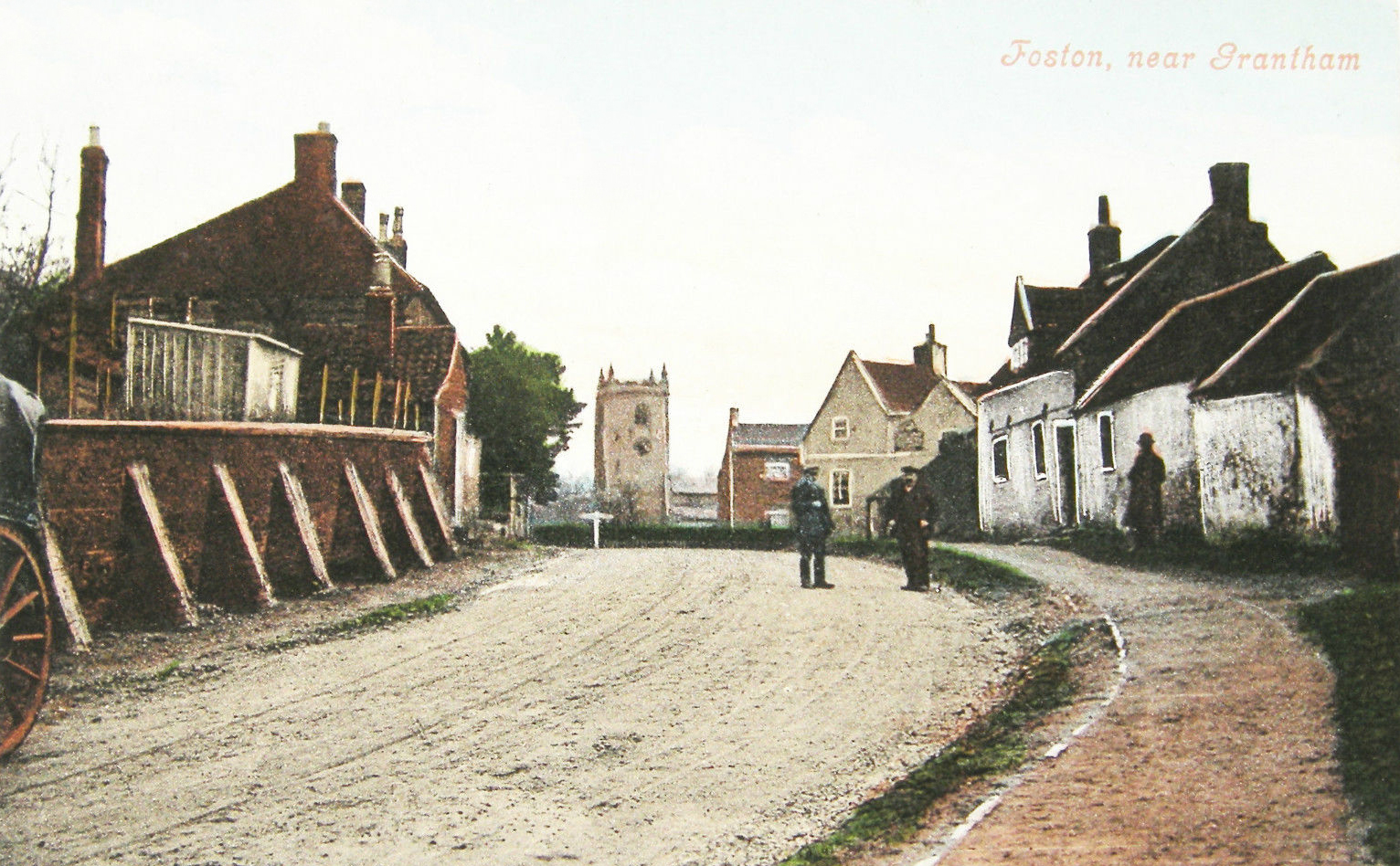
Foston before 1911. Main Street with St Peter's Church and The Black Horse public house

According to A Dictionary of British Place Names, Foston derives from "a farmstead or a village of a man called Fotr"; Fotr being an Old Scandinavian personal name. In the Domesday Book, Foston is written as 'Foztun'.

In Domesday there are entries for two manors in the Hundred of Loveden at Foston. Between the two there were 64 households, with 12 villagers, 6 smallholders, and 43 freemen. There were 16 ploughlands and 100 acres (0.4 km^{2}) of meadow. The manorial lord of one manor in 1066 was Thorfridh, this transferred by 1086 to Hervey; the other in 1066, Earl Ralph the constable, transferred to Count Alan of Brittany who was also Tenant-in-chief to King William I for both manors.

In 1872 White's Directory reported that Foston had a population of 329 within a parish of 2,180 acres (9 km^{2}), the land of which largely belonged to the Earl of Dysart. The ecclesiastical parish was a joint benefice with Long Bennington under the patronage of Queen Victoria. The impropriator was the Earl of Dysart, but the tithes (tax income from parishioners derived from their profit on sales, or extraction of produce and animals, typically to the tenth part) were commuted after an enclosure of 1793, under the Inclosure Act 1773. A National School was built in 1847. The nearest railway station was at Hougham. Trades listed in 1872 included three tailors, four shopkeepers, two shoemakers, a cattle salesman, a corn miller, a butcher, a carpenter, a blacksmith, a machine owner, a harness maker who was also an assistant overseer, two carriers—horse-drawn wagon operators carrying goods and sometimes people between places of trade—operating between the village and both Newark and Grantham, and seven farmers, four of whom were also graziers. There were the licensed victuallers of The White Horse, The Duke William and The Black Boy public houses. The victualler of The Black Boy was also a wheelwright.

== Landmarks ==
At the south of the parish, south from the A1 and east from Foston Road leading to Allington, is the site of an 18th-century windmill.

Foston contains five listed buildings. The Grade I parish Church of St Peter on Church Street dates to the late 12th century, with later additions and changes, including, in 1859, those by Charles Kirk the Younger, son to the senior Charles Kirk. Foston's Grade II listed buildings on Main Street are: the brick built Manor Farmhouse, dating to the late 18th century; the late 18th-century 'Renard', a red brick house converted from two cottages; and The Old Hall, a stone and red brick house dating at its earliest to 1647. On Newark Hill is The Old Post Office, a Grade II brick house dating to the early 19th century.
