= Brierley Forest Park =

Forest Park in Sutton, Ashfield

Coordinates: 53.134°N 1.286°W

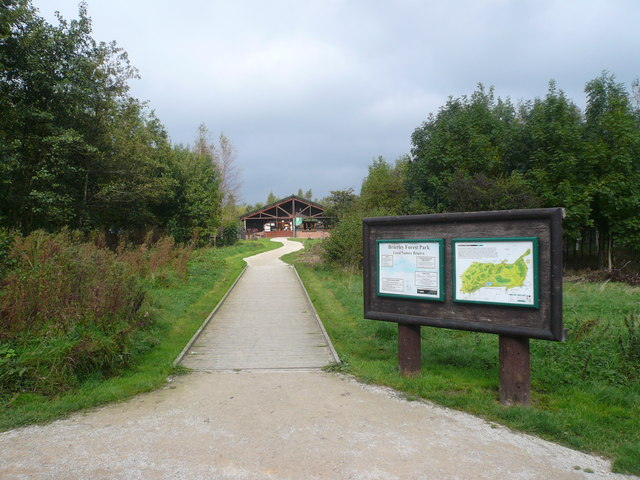

Brierley Forest Park, Sutton in Ashfield was designated a Local Nature Reserve in 2006. It contains Calcareous grassland, sown grassland, wildflower meadows with hoary ragwort, yellow-wort, wild carrot and lesser trefoil. There are four wetland feature areas, Brierley Waters, a reed swamp, Rooley Brook and the visitor centre pond. There are species rich hedgerows, woodland and semi natural vegetation.

== Description ==
The park has a visitor centre, fishing, football pitches, children's play areas, picnicking, cycling and horse paths, bird feeding stations, an arboretum, a remembrance grove and disabled car parking. A Parkrun takes place every Saturday morning.
