= Vill =

Archaic land unit in Britain and Ireland

Vill is a term used in English, Welsh and Irish history to describe a basic rural land unit, roughly comparable to that of a parish, manor, village or tithing.

== Medieval developments ==
The vill was the smallest territorial and administrative unit—a geographical subdivision of the hundred and county—in Anglo-Saxon England. It served both a policing function through the tithing, and the economic function of organising common projects through the village moot. The term is the Anglicized form of the word villa, used in Latin documents to translate the Anglo-Saxon tun.

The vill remained the basic rural unit after the Norman Conquest—land units in the Domesday Book are frequently referred to as vills—and into the late medieval era. Whereas the manor was a unit of landholding, the vill was a territorial one—most vills did not tally physically with manor boundaries—and a public part of the royal administration. The vill had judicial and policing functions, including frankpledge, as well as responsibility for taxation, roads and bridges. It would also organise the communal pastures, the seasonal chronology of rural agriculture, and the three-field system.

With the Angevin growth of royal, as opposed to feudal, government, new duties were imposed upon the vill. By the early 12th century, the reeve and four villagers were required to attend the hundred court "on behalf of all"; in the 1166 Assize of Clarendon, "four of the more lawful men of each vill" were required to present malefactors. Four men and the reeve were again called on for tax assessment in 1198; the Ordinance of 1242 on policing provided for "continuous watch ... in every vill by six men or four or less according to the number of the inhabitants".

At the same time, the vill emerged as a legal entity in its own right, taking oppressive lords of the manor to court, or suing other vills, or purchasing privileges from the Crown, as well as repairing bridges and churches as required. While retaining and even extending its hierarchical and socially stratified nature to the end, the medieval vill always remained a vibrant part of local rural life.

== Legal and other usage ==
- Traditionally, among legal historians, a vill referred to the tract of land of a rural community, whereas "township" was referred to when the tax and legal administration of a rural community was meant.
- The word would later develop into ville and village, while an unfree inhabitant of a vill was called a villein.

== See also ==
- Peatling Magna
- Soke
