= Peatling Magna =

Village in Leicestershire, England

Coordinates: 52.5322°N 1.12627°W

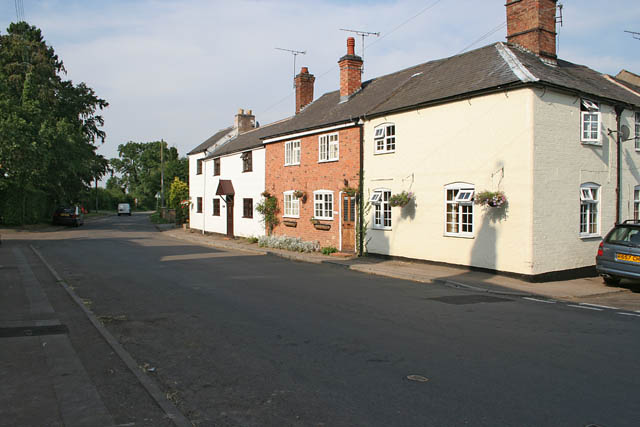
- Corner of Main Street and School Lane, Peatling Magna

- Location within Leicestershire
- Population: 210 (2011 Census)
- OS grid reference: SP593930
- Civil parish: Peatling Magna
- District: Harborough
- Shire county: Leicestershire
- Region: East Midlands
- Country: England
- Sovereign state: United Kingdom
- Post town: LEICESTER
- Postcode district: LE8
- Dialling code: 0116
- Police: Leicestershire
- Fire: Leicestershire
- Ambulance: East Midlands
- UK Parliament: South Leicestershire

Peatling Magna (also once known as Great Petlyng and later as Great Peatling) is a village in the Harborough district in south Leicestershire, England. The population of the civil parish at the 2011 census was 210. It lies 3.7 km north-east of Ashby Magna and 2.9 km north-north-east of Peatling Parva.

== Church ==
The church of All Saints is mainly of the 14th and 15th centuries and contains some fine examples of carved woodwork of different periods.

== Medieval notableness ==
- In 1265, Peatling Magna stepped onto the national stage when, after the battle of Evesham, the villages refused to co-operate with men of the victorious royal forces, on the grounds that the latter were “going against the welfare of the community of the realm”. The fracas which followed eventually led to the village appearing in court, as recorded in the Plea Rolls of 1266, in the person of the reeve and four men as representatives of “the community of the vill.” F. M. Powicke saw the case as indicative of the penetration of communal ideas, local and national, to the smallest village level in 13th century England.
- In 1384, Peatling Magna was mentioned as "Great Petlyng" in a pardon granted to Thomas Astell, Thomas Mathew, and John Scot of "Great Petlyng" for the death of Nicholas Man of "Great Petlyng", as William de Skypwith and other justices assigned to deliver the gaol (jail) at Leicester Castle found that Astell and the others had acted in self-defence. (Just how three men killed one man in "self-defence" was not explained.)
