= Muston, Leicestershire =

Village in Leicestershire, England

Coordinates: 52°56′00″N 0°46′07″W

Muston
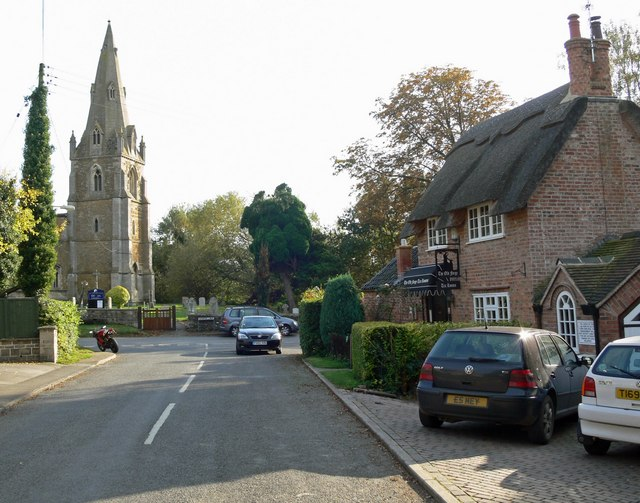
- Muston village

- Location within Leicestershire
- OS grid reference: SK 828 380
  - London: 116 miles (187 km)
- Civil parish: Bottesford
- District: Melton
- Shire county: Leicestershire
- Region: East Midlands
- Country: England
- Sovereign state: United Kingdom
- Post town: NOTTINGHAM
- Postcode district: NG13
- Dialling code: 01949
- Police: Leicestershire
- Fire: Leicestershire
- Ambulance: East Midlands
- UK Parliament: Melton and Syston

Muston (pronounced Musson) is a village and former civil parish, now in the parish of Bottesford, in the Melton district of Leicestershire, England. It is 18.6 miles (29.9 km) east of Nottingham, five miles (8.0 km) west of Grantham on the A52 and 12.5 miles (20.1 km) north of Melton Mowbray. It lies on the border of Leicestershire and Lincolnshire, two miles east of Bottesford. The River Devon (pronounced Deevon) flows through the village. In 1931 the parish had a population of 218. On 1 April 1936 the parish was abolished and merged with Bottesford.

== Facilities ==
The parish church is dedicated to St John the Baptist. It is in the Belvoir Group of parishes, based in Bottesford, and under the Diocese of Leicester.

Muston Meadows is a nearby 41-hectare (100-acre) grassland nature reserve featuring 33 types of grass and over 100 other species of flowering plant. The reserve is notable for its colony of over 10,000 Green-winged Orchids. The 14th-century cross on the village green is a Grade II* listed structure. The Viking Way, a long-distance footpath between North Lincolnshire and Rutland, passes one-half mile (0.80 km) to the east of the village.

The village lies near the Bingham–Bottesford–Grantham bus route, which runs about once an hour in the daytime on weekdays but does not stop at Muston. The local pub, the Muston Gap, occupies a Grade II listed building dating back to the 18th century. It stands on the A52, 110 yards (100 metres) from the Nottingham–Grantham railway line, where the nearest station is Bottesford 1.8 miles away (3 km). Muston also has a café (the Old Forge Tea Rooms), bed and breakfast facilities (Glebe House, a Grade II listed building, and Chantry Cottage), a children's play area and a village hall (Old School Muston).

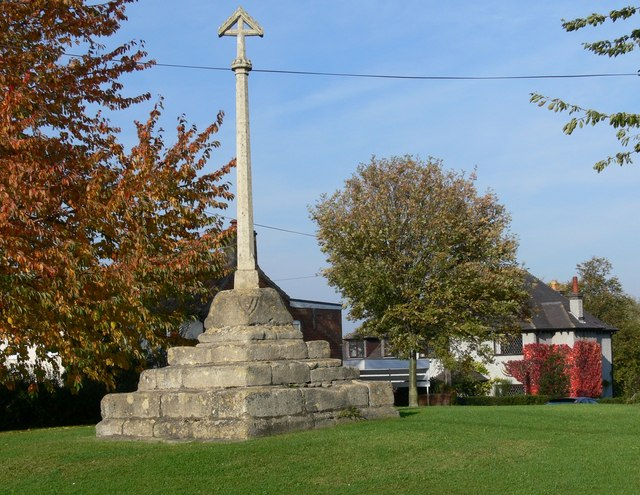
14th century stone cross

== Muston of old ==
Muston belonged to the ancient hundred or wapentake of Framland. Muston Gorse wharf on the Grantham Canal was the terminus of the private Belvoir Tramway to Belvoir Castle, which opened in 1793. Some detailed, amply illustrated information on Muston and its past appears on the Bottesford Living History website.

John Marius Wilson's Imperial Gazetteer of England and Wales (1870–72): "MUSTON... stands on the River Devon, adjacent to the boundary with Lincolnshire, near the Grantham Canal, 1½ mile east-south-east of Bottesford railway station, and 5½ west by north of Grantham; and has a post office under Nottingham. The paZrish comprises 1,623 acres. Real property, £2,694. Pop., 360. Houses, 74. The property is divided among a few. The manor belongs to the Duke of Rutland. The living is a rectory in the diocese of Peterborough. Value, £400.*Patron, the Lord Chancellor. The church is a handsome structure; and consists of nave, aisles, chancel and two porches, with central tower and spire. There are (sic) a Wesleyan chapel and a national school."

== Famous people ==
Property in Muston was owned by Nathaniel Hallowes (1582–1661) of Derby, an English politician who sat in the English House of Commons from 1640 to 1653 and again in 1659. He was an active Parliamentarian during the English Civil War.

The poet George Crabbe (1754–1832) moved to Muston Rectory (later Glebe House) from a curacy at Stathern in 1789, having previously been chaplain to the Duke of Rutland from 1782 to 1784. He was a resident incumbent of Muston and of nearby West Allington, Lincolnshire until 1792, but then an absentee until 1805. He remained resident for most of the period up to 1814, when he became rector of Trowbridge, Wiltshire. His Natural History of the Vale of Belvoir was a pioneering study of the district.
