= Ashby Magna =

Village in Leicestershire, England

Coordinates: 52.5107°N 01.1725°W

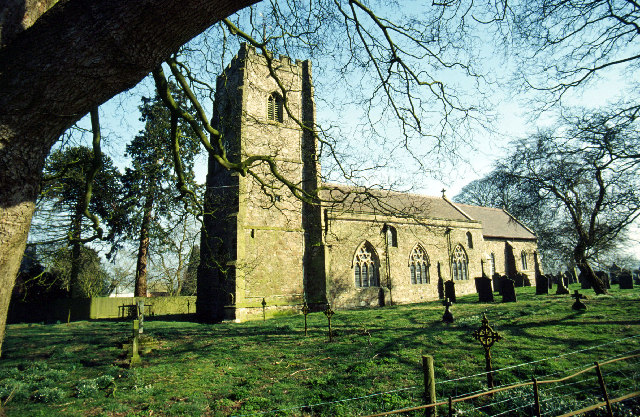
- St Mary's Church, Ashby Magna

- Location within Leicestershire
- Population: 347 (2011)
- OS grid reference: SP5690
- District: Harborough
- Shire county: Leicestershire
- Region: East Midlands
- Country: England
- Sovereign state: United Kingdom
- Post town: Lutterworth
- Postcode district: LE17
- Dialling code: 01455
- Police: Leicestershire
- Fire: Leicestershire
- Ambulance: East Midlands
- UK Parliament: South Leicestershire

Ashby Magna is a small English village and civil parish in the Harborough district of Leicestershire. The parish has a population of 294, increasing at the 2011 census to 347. It is in the west of the district, and lies midway between junctions 20 and 21 of the M1. Nearby places are Willoughby Waterleys, Peatling Parva and Dunton Bassett.

The village is of Danish origin and recorded in the Domesday Book as 'Essebi' or 'Asseby'. Its name derives from the 'ash' tree, from 'by', Old Danish for a farmstead or settlement, and from 'Magna', Latin for great. It was large by medieval standards but the population has remained static at around 300–400.

The Anglican church of St Mary's is a grade II* listed building currently on Historic England's Heritage at Risk Register as being in a poor state and it has been the subject of heritage crime.
