= Peatling Parva =

Village in Leicestershire, England

Coordinates: 52.51599°N 1.12702°W

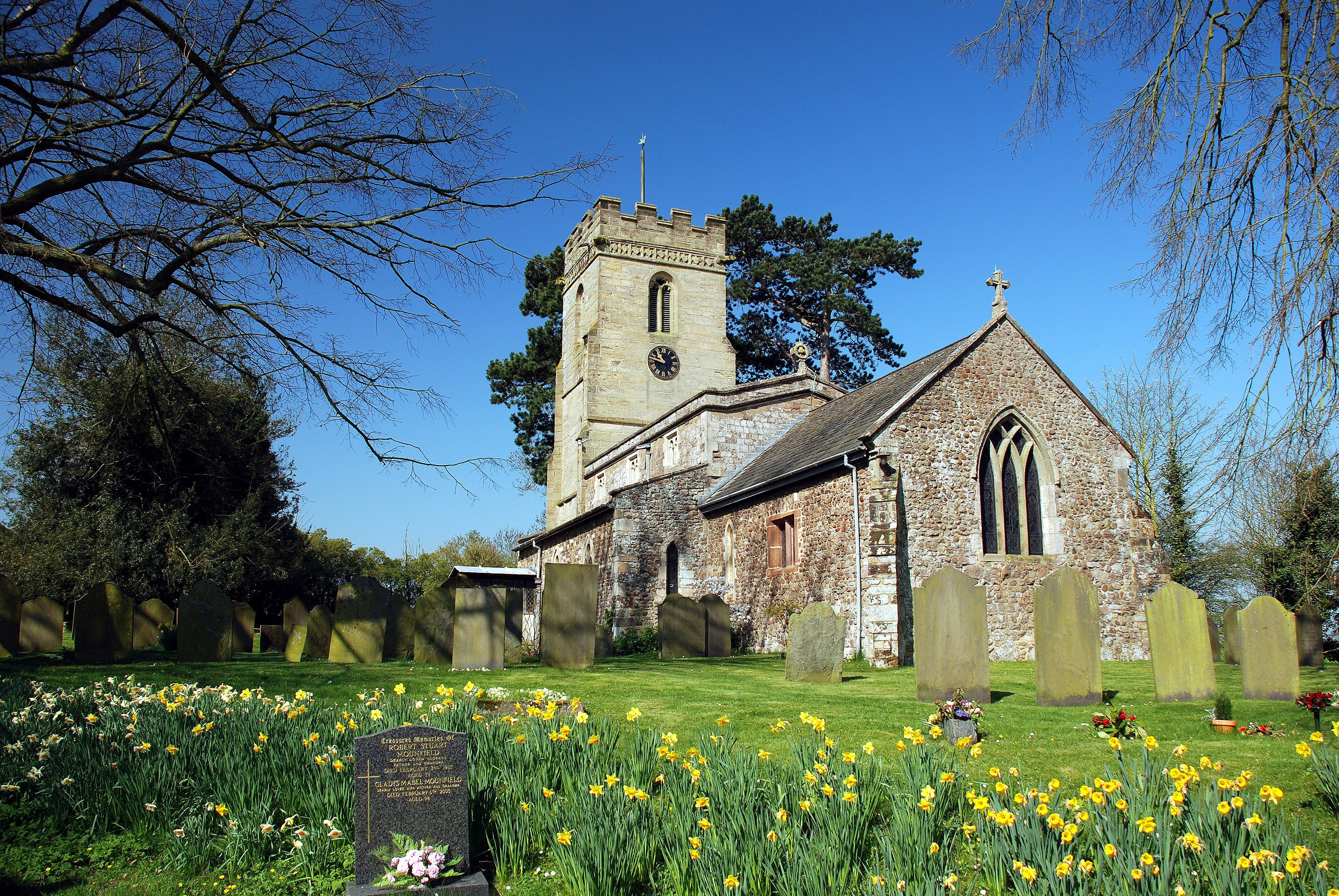
- St Andrews Church Peatling Parva

- Location within Leicestershire
- Population: 181 (2001 Census)
- OS grid reference: SP593912
- Civil parish: Peatling Parva
- District: Harborough
- Shire county: Leicestershire
- Region: East Midlands
- Country: England
- Sovereign state: United Kingdom
- Post town: LUTTERWORTH
- Postcode district: LE17
- Dialling code: 0116
- Police: Leicestershire
- Fire: Leicestershire
- Ambulance: East Midlands
- UK Parliament: South Leicestershire

Peatling Parva is a village and civil parish in the Harborough district, south Leicestershire, England. It lies 2.6 km west-north-west of Ashby Magna and 2.9 km south-south-west of Peatling Magna.

The village is recorded in the Domesday Book from 1086 and was known as Alia Petlinge with listed landowners Howard, from Hugh de Grandmesnil, and Leofric, from Adelaide wife of Hugh de Grandmensil.

The population was recorded as 159 in the 1841 census and 181 in the census of 2001.

A village church, St Andrews Church, is part of the Diocese of Leicester of the Church of England. The village also has a public house, The Shires Inn. A village hall was built in 1989 and holds local meetings of the Parish Council. It is a regular polling station for local, national and European elections and hosts performances from Centre Stage, a rural and community touring scheme.

Peatling Parva lies adjacent to the villages of Gilmorton and Bruntingthorpe, home to the Bruntingthorpe Aerodrome and Proving Ground.
