= Teversal Manor =

Village in Nottinghamshire, England

Coordinates: 53.1513°N 1.2792°W

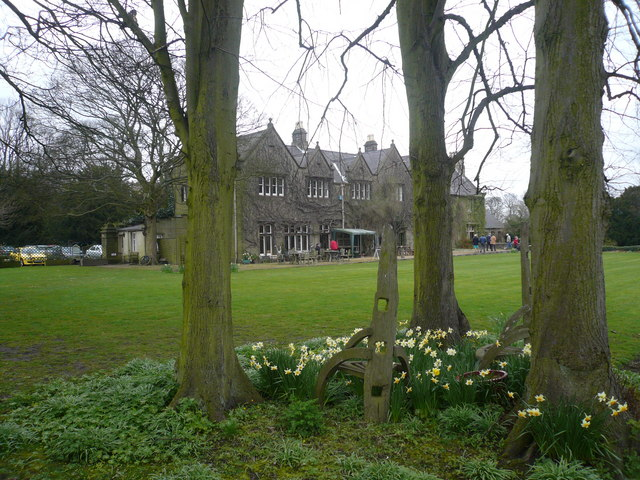
- The manor from the back garden

- Location within Nottinghamshire
- OS grid reference: SK484619
- District: Ashfield
- Shire county: Nottinghamshire
- Region: East Midlands
- Country: England
- Sovereign state: United Kingdom
- Post town: Sutton-in-Ashfield
- Police: Nottinghamshire
- Fire: Nottinghamshire
- Ambulance: East Midlands

Listed Building – Grade II
- Official name: Teversal Manor
- Designated: 15 June 1989
- Reference no.: 1274450

Teversal Manor is a small 17th-century country house in Teversal, Nottinghamshire, some 5 km (3 miles) west of Mansfield. The manor is known for its links with D. H. Lawrence’s book Lady Chatterley's Lover.

The building is constructed of coursed and dressed rubble stone with ashlar dressings and slate roofs. It is built in two storeys with attics with an irregular 7 bay frontage.

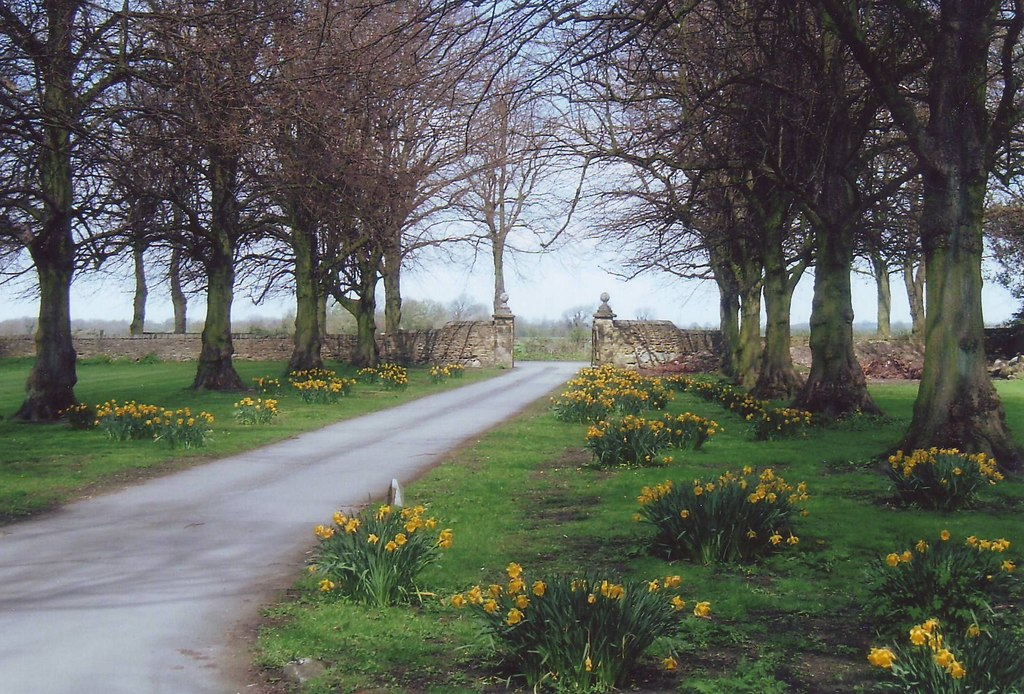
Entrance to Teversal Manor

== History ==
Prior to 1562 Roger Greenhalgh owned Teversal Manor. The manor was inherited in that year by Greenhalgh's son-in-law Francis Molyneux. He was High Sheriff of Nottinghamshire for 1582–83. His grandson Sir John Molyneux, 1st Baronet, was High Sheriff for 1609 and created a baronet in 1611. The Molyneux baronets and families remained in the village for about 150 years.

The estate descended to Sir Francis Molyneux, 7th Baronet (1738-1812), who was a courtier who became Gentleman Usher of the Black Rod. On his death, unmarried, his estates at Teversal and Wellow passed to his nephew Henry Howard, who adopted the surname Molyneux-Howard and died in 1824.

Teversal passed to his daughter Henrietta Anna Howard-Molyneux-Howard, who married in 1830 John George, the 3rd Earl of Carnarvon. He died young in 1849, but his widow lived until 1876. The house was remodelled by MacVicar Anderson in a neo-Jacobean style for the Hon. Henrietta Molyneux. The Carnarvons retained possession of the house until the death of Henry, the 4th Earl's wife, Elizabeth Catherine (née Howard), in 1929. The 4th Earl was a British cabinet minister and Lord Lieutenant of Ireland. His wife, Elizabeth Catherine Howard, otherwise known as Elsie, used the Manor at Teversal for refugees. Their son George Herbert, 5th Earl of Carnarvon, and his wife Almina were associated with Howard Carter and funded the excavations of Tutankhamun's tomb in 1922. Aubrey Herbert, the half Brother of the 5th Earl of Carnarvon, celebrated his coming of age at Teversal Manor.

The manor was visited by Virginia Woolf in 1904, and is believed to be the basis of the fictional Wragby Hall in D. H. Lawrence's 1928 novel Lady Chatterley’s Lover.
