= Teversal =

Village in Nottinghamshire, England

Coordinates: 53.1518°N 1.2794°W

- Village
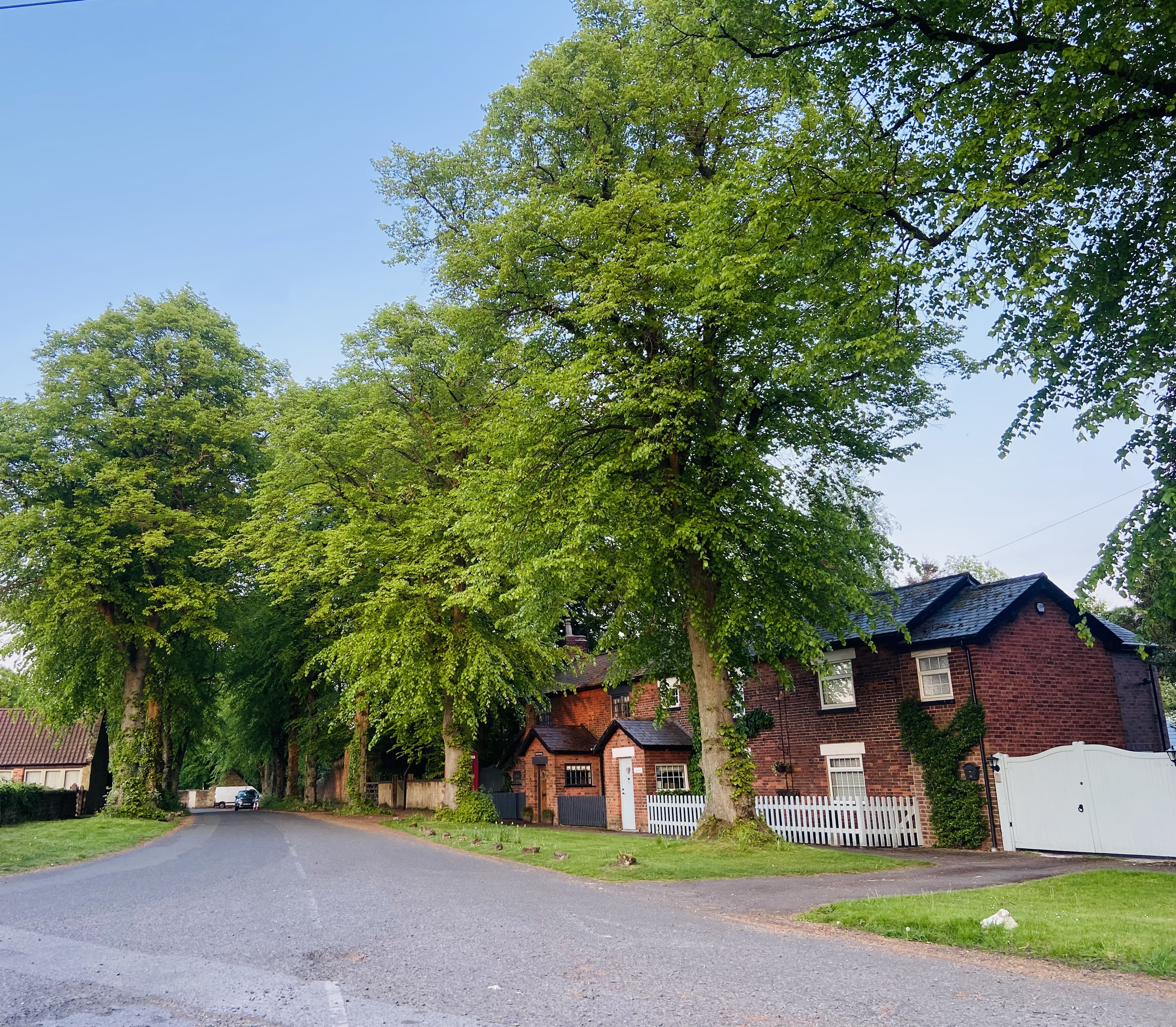
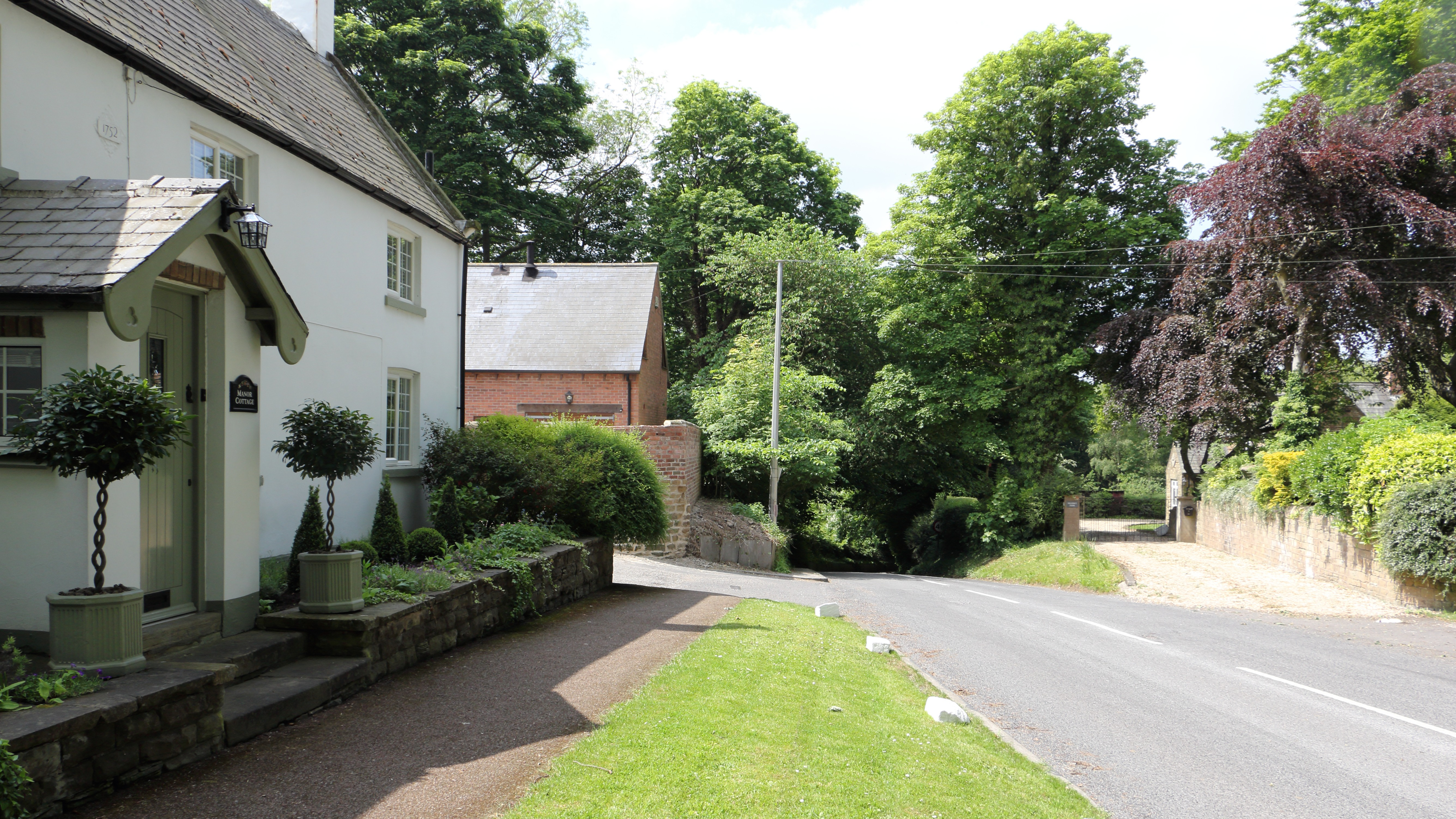
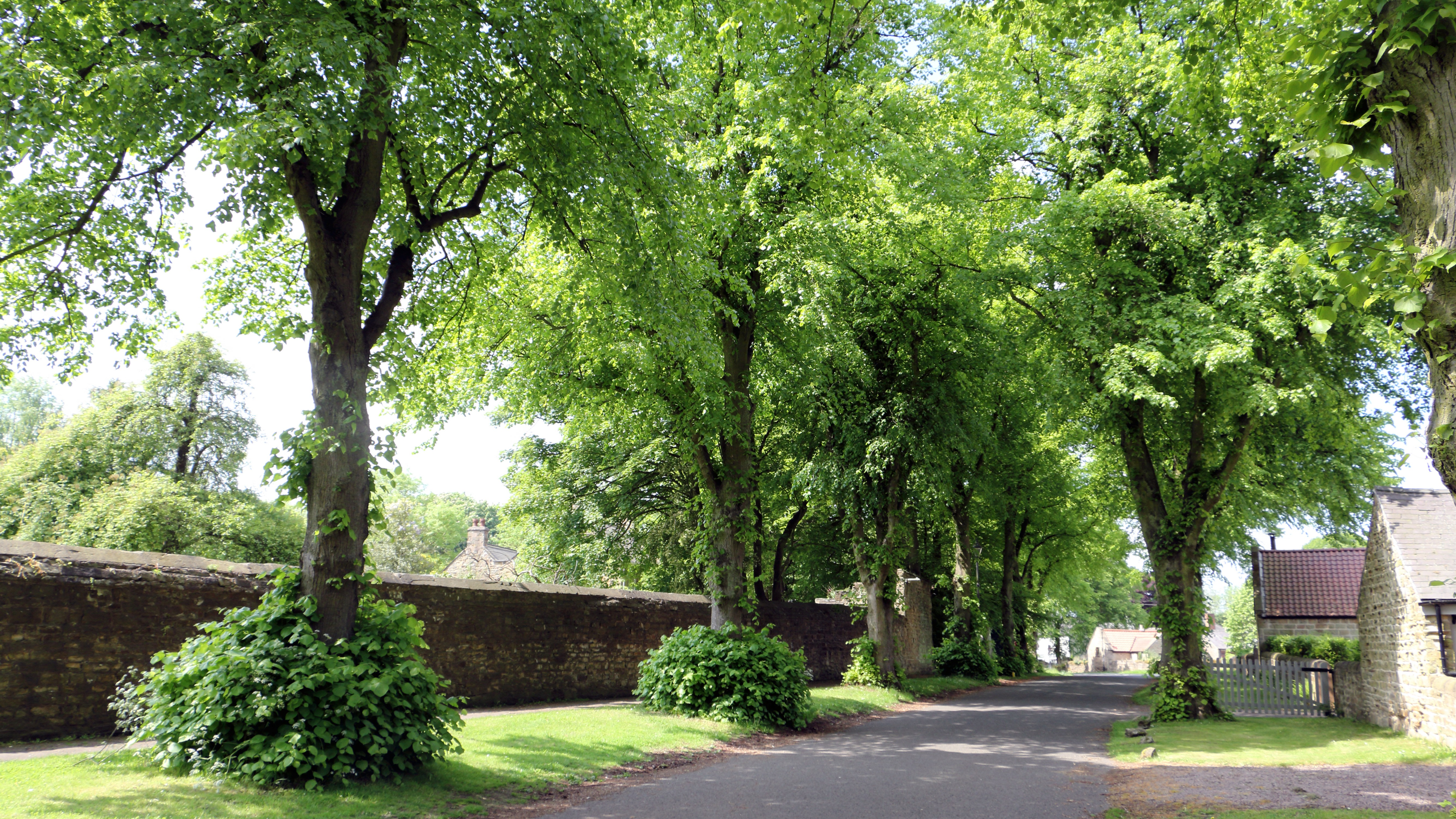
- Teversal village cottages Pleasley Road Buttery Lane

- Location within Nottinghamshire
- OS grid reference: SK484619
- District: Ashfield
- Shire county: Nottinghamshire
- Region: East Midlands
- Country: England
- Sovereign state: United Kingdom
- Post town: Sutton-in-Ashfield
- Postcode district: NG17
- Dialling code: 01623
- Police: Nottinghamshire
- Fire: Nottinghamshire
- Ambulance: East Midlands
- UK Parliament: Ashfield

Teversal is a village in the Ashfield district of Nottinghamshire, England. It lies north of Sutton-in-Ashfield and 3 miles (5 km) west of Mansfield. It is close to the boundary with Derbyshire. Former names include Tevershalt, Teversholt, Tyversholtee, Teversale, Tevershall and Teversall. Teversal Manor is said to have inspired D. H. Lawrence to write his book Lady Chatterley's Lover.

== Etymology ==
Different conjectures have been devised to the name of Teversal, including that there are two elements to it. The first element referring to tiefrere meaning ‘painter’ used in the sense of ‘sorcerer’. The second element refers to holt, 'wood' and (ge)heald, 'hold, shelter’.

== History ==
Arthur Mee (1938) described Teversal as ‘crowning a green hilltop, looking out to Hardwick Hall in splendid trees two miles away, it is a charming oasis where we forget the collieries and find treasure wrought by men who knew not coal’.

Teversal (called Tevershall) is the site of fictional Wragby Hall, the home of Lady Chatterley in the novel Lady Chatterley's Lover by D. H. Lawrence. Teversal is mentioned in the Domesday Book in 1086 within the hundred of Broxtowe. It was the land of Ralph son of Hubert.

As part of the history of Beauchief Abbey, Sheffield in 1190-1225 William Barry, Lord of Teversal was granted two tofts and crofts in Stanley a hamlet within the Teversal area. The grant meant that there was sufficient area for a farm. The land now is now Stanley Grange Farm. In 1525 Thomas North owned the Grange, where he kept his sheep. In 1537 William Bolles owned the Grange, he was a receiver of the governments dissolved monasteries at the time. Bolles later owned Felley Priory after the priory was dissolved in 1536, as part of King Henry VIII's Dissolution of the Monasteries.

Teversal is a former civil parish and had a population of 946 in 1931. On 1 April 1935 the parish was abolished and the area became part of the parish and urban district of Sutton in Ashfield. Sutton in Ashfield Urban District was in turn abolished in 1974 to become part of the new district of Ashfield. No successor parish was created for the former urban district and so Teversal is directly administered by Ashfield District Council.

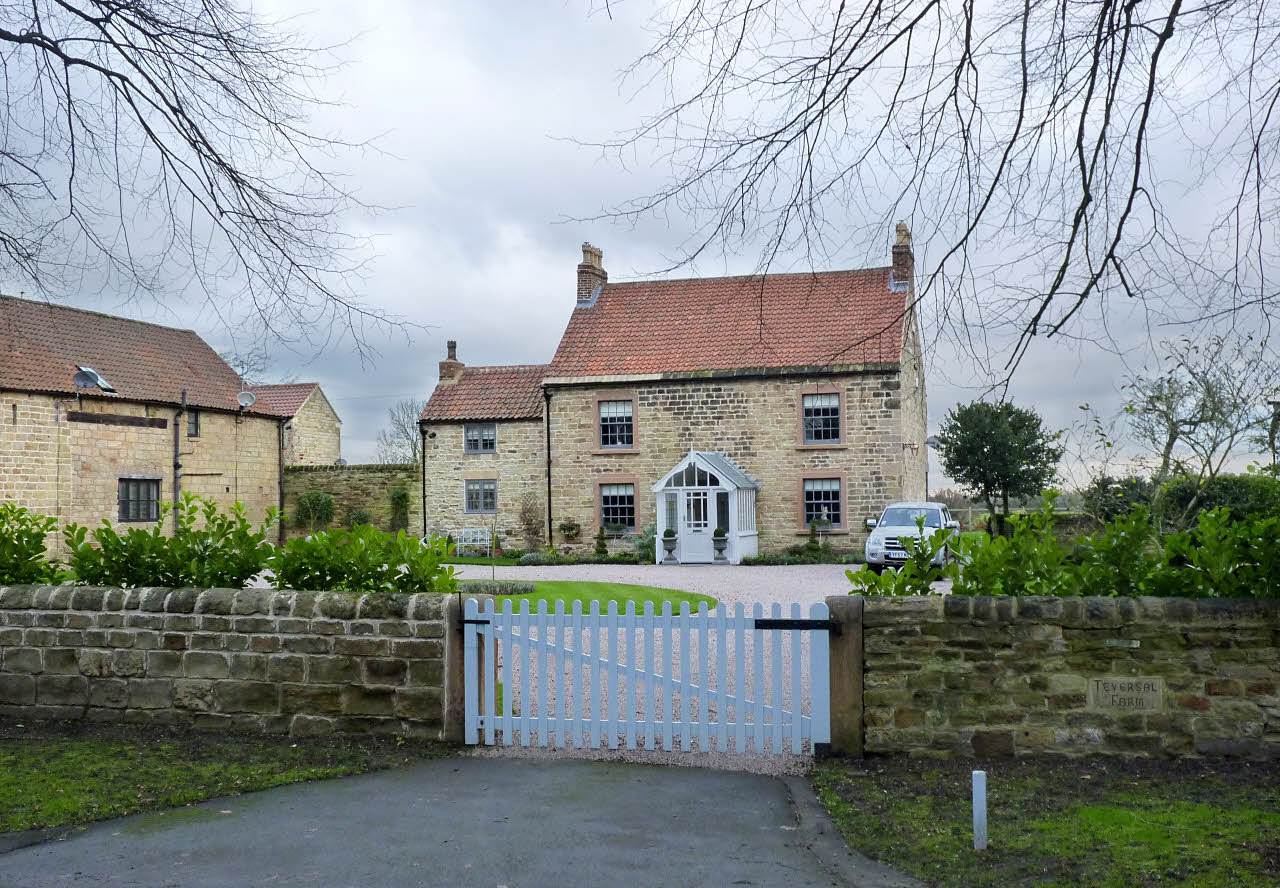
Teversal Farmhouse

== Teversal Manor ==
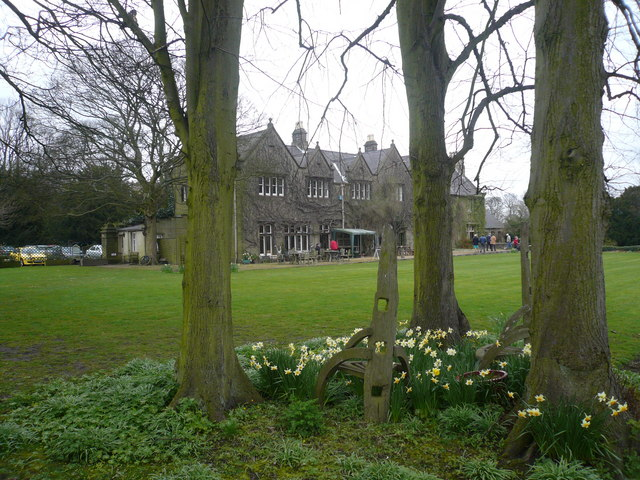
Teversal Manor

Prior to 1562 Roger Greenhalgh owned Teversal Manor. The Manor was then transferred to Francis Molyneux the son in law of Roger in 1582. Francis Molyneux, the High Sheriff of Nottinghamshire between 1582 and 1583 owned Teversal Manor with Francis's grandson John Molyneux being the High Sheriff in 1609. John became the first Baronet of Teversal. The Molyneux baronets and families remained in the village for about 150 years. The Molyneux family were an ancient Norman family.

Teversal Manor was passed to Sir Francis Molyneux, 7th Baronet in (1738-1812). Sir Francis became the Gentleman Usher of the Black Rod. On his death passed the estate of Teversal Manor to Lord Henry Howard-Molyneux-Howard.[41] Lord Henry's eldest daughter was Henrietta Anna Howard-Molyneux-Howard who married Henry Herbert, 3rd Earl of Carnarvon in 1830. The Carnarvon family seat and residence today remains as Highclere Castle in Hampshire.

Teversal Manor was passed to Henrietta. The Carnarvons retained the manor which was then passed to the son of the 3rd Earl to Henry Herbert, 4th Earl of Carnarvon, who was a British cabinet minister and Lord Lieutenant of Ireland who married Elizabeth Catherine Howard otherwise known as Elsie. Elsie used the Manor at Teversal for refugees. His son George Herbert, 5th Earl of Carnarvon, and his wife Almina were associated with Howard Carter and funded the excavations of Tutankhamun's tomb in 1922.

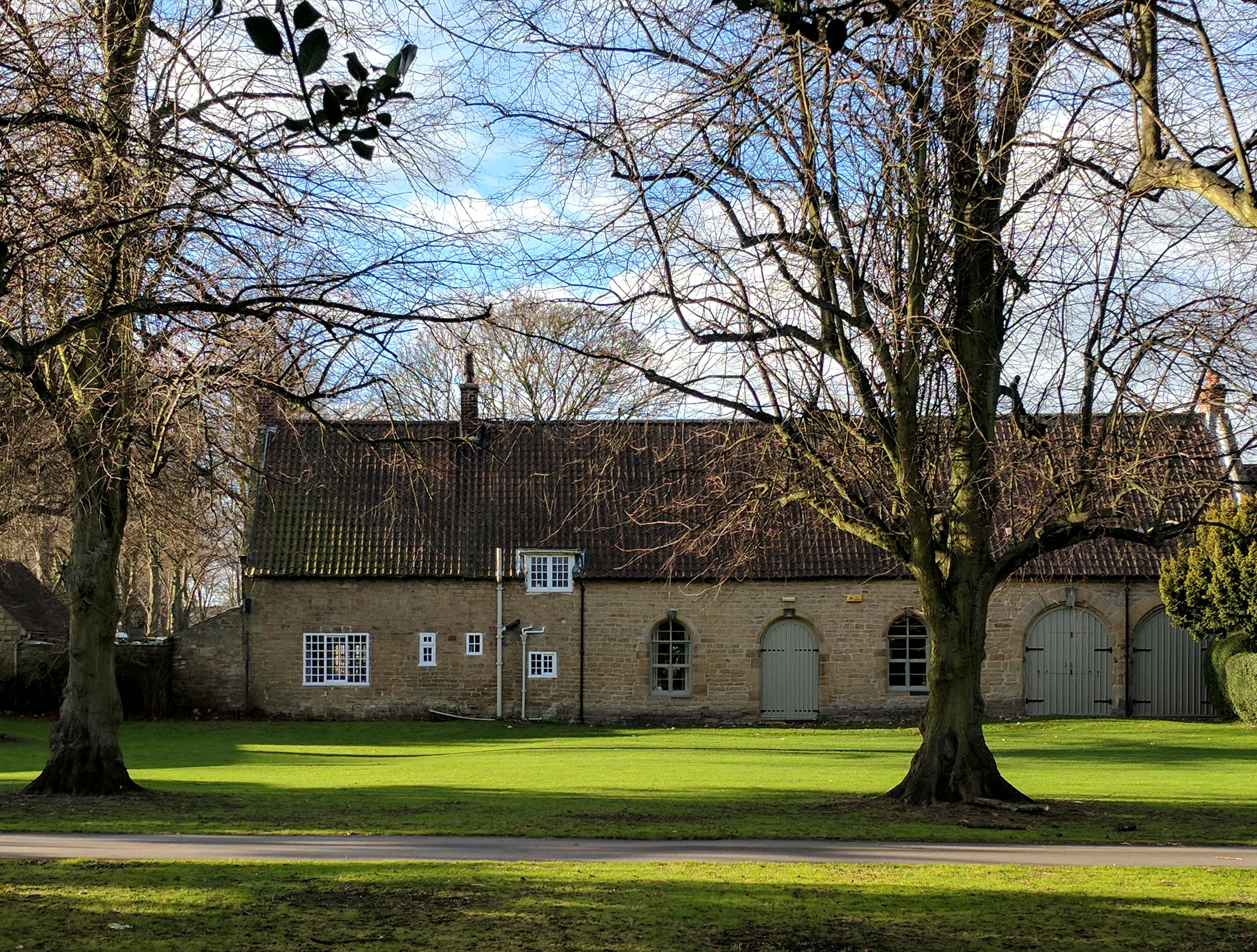
The old School House and the Manor Room

Aubrey Herbert, the half Brother of the 5th Earl of Carnarvon, celebrated his coming of age birthday at Teversal Manor. Teversal Manor was visited by the author Virginia Woolf in 1904.

Teversal Manor is believed to be the basis of the fictional Wragby Hall in D. H. Lawrence's 1928 novel Lady Chatterley’s Lover.

== Church ==
St Katherine's Church is a Grade I listed building.

== Teversal Trails ==
The Teversal, Skegby and Silverhill Trails are a series of paths on the route of old railway lines. The Visitor Centre is located nearby with a car park that serves the football, cricket and bowls clubs. The trails link into the Skegby/Pleasley Trails, with others leading into Silverhill.

== See also ==
- Listed buildings in Teversal
