= Waltham on the Wolds and Thorpe Arnold =

Civil parish in Leicestershire, England

Coordinates: 52.806°N 0.843°W

- Civil parish
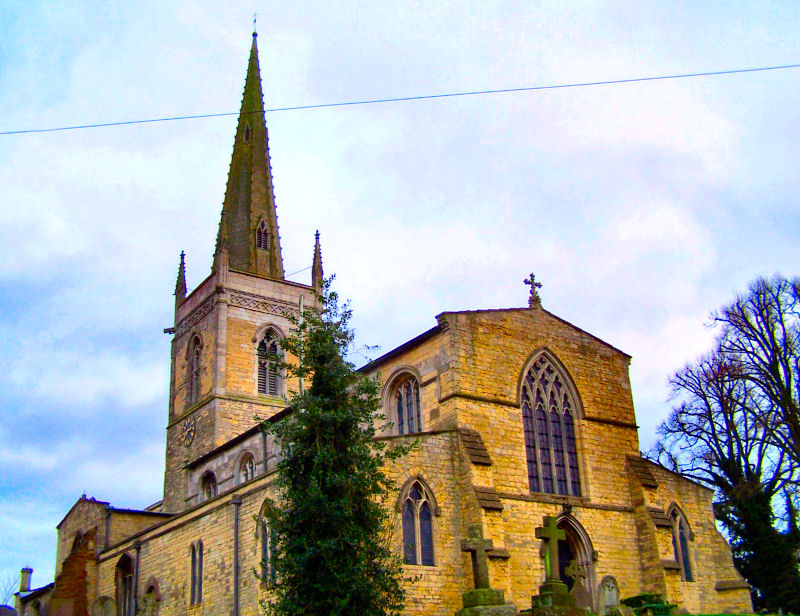
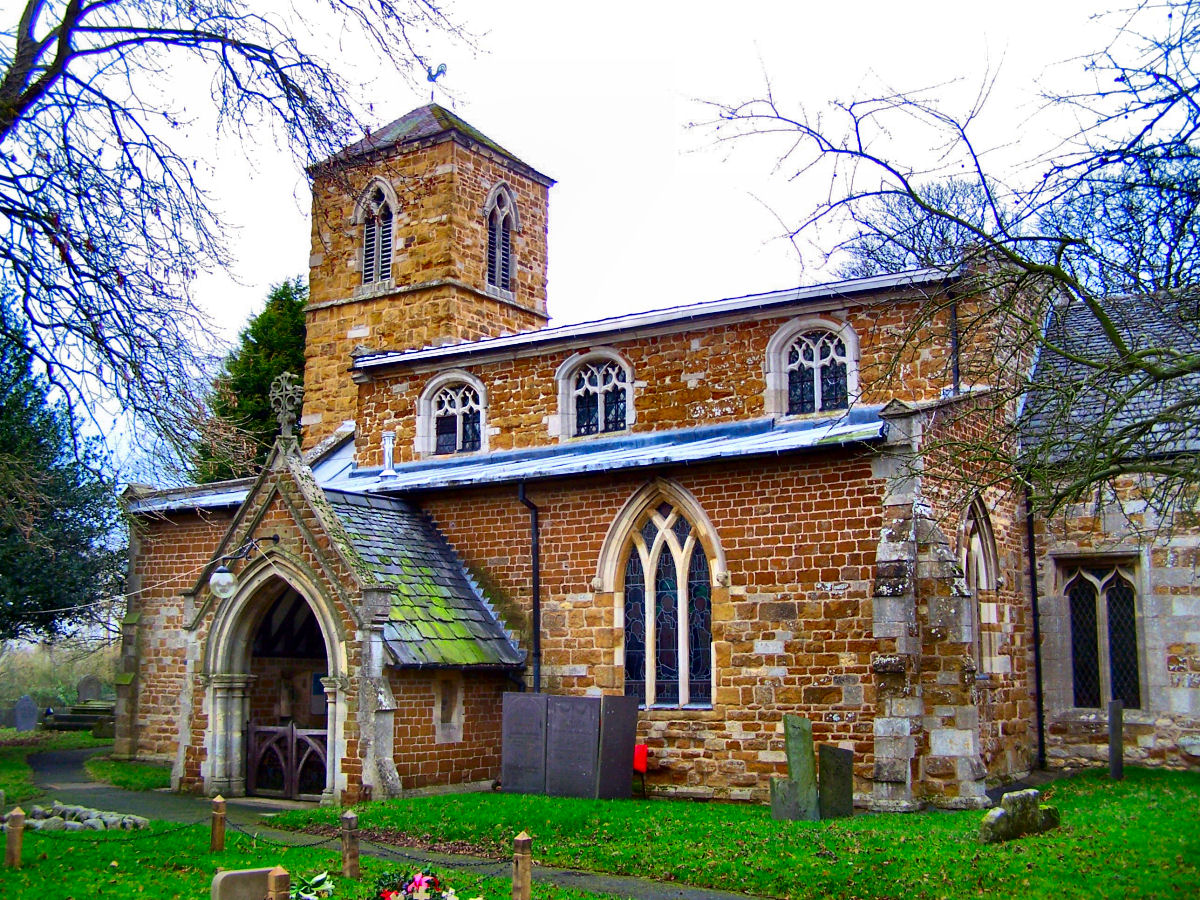
- St Mary Magdalene Church, Waltham on the Wolds St Mary the Virgin, Thorpe Arnold

- Location within Leicestershire
- Interactive map of Waltham on the Wolds and Thorpe Arnold
- Area: 6.57 sq mi (17.0 km^{2})
- Population: 1,166
  - Density: 177/sq mi (68/km^{2})
- OS grid reference: SK 792224
- District: Melton
- Shire county: Leicestershire
- Region: East Midlands
- Country: England
- Sovereign state: United Kingdom
- Settlements: Waltham on the Wolds; Thorpe Arnold
- Post town: MELTON MOWBRAY
- Postcode district: LE14
- Dialling code: 01664
- Police: Leicestershire
- Fire: Leicestershire
- Ambulance: East Midlands
- UK Parliament: Rutland and Melton
- Website: www.wotwtaparishcouncil.org.uk

Waltham on the Wolds and Thorpe Arnold is a civil parish in the Borough of Melton in Leicestershire, England. Measuring approximately 5 miles (8.0 km) north-to-south and 2 miles (3.2 km) east-to-west, the parish contains the principal village of Waltham on the Wolds and the smaller neighbouring village of Thorpe Arnold, situated north-east of Melton Mowbray. The parish had a population of 1,166 across approximately 492 households at the 2021 census. It covers 6.57 square miles (17.0 km^{2}) of rural countryside on the edge of the Leicestershire Wolds.

== Geography ==
=== Location ===
Waltham on the Wolds and Thorpe Arnold lies to the north‑east of Melton Mowbray, occupying part of the Leicestershire Wolds, an area of elevated countryside characterised by rolling ridges, open farmland and long views across the surrounding landscape. The parish sits between the Vale of Belvoir to the north and the River Eye valley to the west, giving it a mix of upland and lowland features.

The parish is bordered by Croxton Kerrial and Eaton to the north, Freeby and Sproxton to the east, and Scalford to the west. To the south it adjoins the unparished area of Melton Mowbray, which provides the main centre for services, retail and transport connections.

The A607 forms the principal road link through the area connecting its settlements, and further afield the parish with Melton Mowbray and Grantham. Local lanes provide access between the two villages and surrounding farmland, while footpaths and bridleways offer routes across the Wolds landscape. The settlements retain strong historic character with conservation areas.

=== Settlements ===
The parish contains:

- Waltham on the Wolds – the larger village, centred on a historic church and village green
- Thorpe Arnold – a smaller village immediately north-east of Melton Mowbray

=== Routes ===
Major routes include:

- The A607 road connecting Melton Mowbray to Grantham
- The A606 Pork Pie Way, a relief road for Melton Mowbray
- Local lanes linking Waltham, Thorpe Arnold, and surrounding hamlets

The nearest railway station is Melton Mowbray, with services towards Leicester, Nottingham and Peterborough.

=== Geology and elevation ===
Waltham sits on an elevated plateau on the eastern edge of the Leicestershire Wolds at 168 metres (551 ft) above sea level, making it the second-highest village in Leicestershire. The highest point reaches approximately 176 metres (577 ft) by a transmission mast to the south of the village, dropping southwards towards the River Eye valley near Thorpe Arnold, where the lowest elevation is 81 metres (266 ft).

Geologically, the underlying strata consist of Jurassic limestone, sand, gravel, and red marl, including the Marlstone Rock Formation—a Middle Lias ferruginous limestone and ironstone bed. Building materials were historically extracted from local quarries, including Stonesby quarry (now the Bescaby Lane SSSI nature reserve). Two distinct local ironstone varieties—older ironstones capping higher ground and younger Northampton Sands ironstone—give many older village buildings their characteristic golden-brown, honey, and cream hues. Bedrock is capped in areas by glacial till and sand deposits, creating fertile soils historically used for mixed arable farming and pasturage. Traditional structures feature regional ironstone, limestone, red brick, slate, thatch, and Bottesford blue or red pantiles, with vernacular details such as hooded corbelled drip courses, over-sailing gables, ornate chimney stacks, and stone boundary walls.

=== Environment and hydrology ===
Due to its high topography, the parish is free from fluvial river flooding, though parts of Waltham experience localized groundwater flooding caused by a perched water table sitting above underlying impermeable clay strata, producing surface runoff along Melton Road following heavy rainfall.

The parish landscape is characterized by:

- Rolling topography
- Mixed farmland
- Hedgerow networks and historic stone wall field boundaries
- Small brooks draining towards the River Eye catchment

== History ==
=== Toponymy ===
The name Waltham derives from the Old English words wald ("forest" or "wooded high ground") and hām ("homestead" or "estate"), signifying a settlement in open or wooded upland country. The affix "on the Wolds" distinguishes it locally by referencing its location on the Leicestershire Wolds (from Old English weald).

Thorpe Arnold combines elements of Old Norse and Anglo-Norman origin. The generic prefix thorpe stems from the Old Norse þorp ("secondary settlement" or "dependent hamlet"), pointing to Danelaw Scandinavian influence in the district. The manorial affix Arnold derives from Ernald de Bois (Ernald II), the 12th-century feudal tenant who held the manor under Robert de Beaumont, Earl of Leicester.

=== Early history ===
The parish has been inhabited since prehistoric times, with evidence of human activity preceding the Roman occupation. Roman brooches, cosmetic mortars, sestertii, and pottery discovered near High Street in Waltham indicate Romano-British activity linked to the Roman 'Saltway' trade route.

Waltham developed as an early medieval settlement at the junction of two ancient tracks. Thorpe Arnold originated as an outlying settlement connected to Melton Mowbray, built over an earlier Celtic or Romano-British site.

Both settlements are recorded in the Domesday Book (1086) under the ownership of Hugh de Grandmesnil, Sheriff of Leicestershire. Thorpe Arnold was held by Walter from Hugh de Grandmesnil, recording 15 carucates of ploughland, 37 workmen, a mill, and 100 acres of meadow. Extensive earthworks, fishponds, and manorial boundary banks mark the footprint of a medieval settlement at Thorpe Arnold much larger than the current village.

=== Medieval and early modern period ===
King John granted substantial land in Waltham to the Abbot of Croxton Abbey. In 1227, King Henry III granted a royal charter establishing a weekly market and an annual fair on 19 September. By the 13th century, wool production and stone trading made Waltham one of Leicestershire's five major market towns, commercially outstripping neighbouring Melton Mowbray with its horse fair.

In the early 13th century, the manor of Waltham was granted to Philip d'Aubigny, a royal knight and tutor to Henry III, who later granted it to Croxton Abbey. Monastic lands passed to Thomas Manners, 1st Earl of Rutland, after the 1541 Dissolution of the Monasteries. The Duke of Rutland's Belvoir Estate managed most of the village's housing and dictated building styles until the properties were auctioned to existing tenants in 1920–1921.

During the mid-19th century, the village hosted a thriving local economy with cheese dairies, tanneries, and wheelwright workshops, alongside up to 15 licensed premises and inns such as The Royal Horseshoes and The Angel.

=== 18th–19th century ===
Enclosure of open fields and commons in 1766 under Parliamentary acts consolidated farm holdings into grazing land, establishing many present-day hedgerows and field networks. The Belvoir Estate enforced architectural standards, rebuilding and improving village properties using regional ironstone, limestone, and red brick.

In 1843, Queen Victoria and Prince Albert visited The Royal Horseshoes Inn in Waltham. That same year, highwayman Thomas ("Gypsy Jack") Britten was arrested at the Waltham horse fair. In 1856, William ("Peppermint Billy") Brown was executed at Leicester Prison for the tollgate murders of keeper Edward Woodcock and his grandson at Thorpe Bar, situated on the parish boundary on Thorpe Road between Melton Mowbray and Thorpe Arnold.

=== Industrial heritage and railways ===
During the late 19th century, large-scale extraction of iron ore transformed local industry. Ironstone pits surrounded Waltham and Thorpe Arnold, serviced by narrow-gauge tramways and incline railways.

Waltham on the Wolds railway station opened in April 1880 as the terminus of the Waltham Branch, constructed by the Great Northern Railway to transport ironstone deposits from local quarries. The station did not run scheduled passenger services, operating instead for freight and occasional special trains serving visitors to the Waltham Fair and race meetings at Croxton Park. The line connected with the Eaton Branch Railway at Eaton Junction immediately south of the station. During the First World War (1916–1918), it transported military traffic to Harrowby Camp at Grantham. Operations continued until closure in 1964.

=== 20th century to present ===
The two civil parishes were formally unified on 1 April 1936 under the Local Government Act 1929. Post-war residential development was gradual, consisting of council housing schemes and localized infill plots. The Waltham transmitting tower was erected south of the village in 1968, Pedigree Petfoods (later Mars) established local operations in 1981, and Twinlakes Theme Park opened in 2003. A relief road for Melton Mowbray, the A606 Pork Pie Way, opened in 2026 to the north and east of Thorpe Arnold.

== Governance ==
The parish is administered by Waltham on the Wolds and Thorpe Arnold Parish Council. District services are provided by Melton Borough Council, and strategic services by Leicestershire County Council. It lies within the Rutland and Melton parliamentary constituency. The Neighbourhood Plan (2017–2036) guides development alongside Melton Borough Council’s Local Plan.

== Demographics ==
The 2021 census recorded 1,166 usual residents living in 492 households across the parish. In the 2011 Census, the parish population stood at 967 residents across 415 dwellings (a figure unchanged from 2001), with an average household size of 2.3 persons.

Single-family detached houses and bungalows made up nearly six out of ten dwellings in 2011 (57%), a significantly higher proportion than the Melton Borough average of 41%. While home valuations historically ran higher than those in neighboring Melton Mowbray, 164 households experienced at least one measure of ONS-defined deprivation.

Data from the 2011 census indicated an older age profile than the Melton Borough average, recording a mean age of 44.9 years compared to 41.7 borough-wide. Children aged under 16 accounted for 16.1% (155 residents) of the population (versus 18.1% across the borough), while residents aged over 65 represented 20.9% (versus 18.4%). A drop between the 0–15 age group (155) and the 16–29 age group (118) reflected outward migration of young adults for education, employment, or housing.

In 2011, 164 residents (17%) managed long-term limiting illnesses. Unpaid care was provided by 92 residents, 25% of whom provided 50 or more hours of care per week. Over 80% of residents report "good" or "very good" health status in ONS data, and owner-occupation exceeds 75%.

== Economy ==
In 2011, the parish had an economically active working population of 512 people, with 41% employed in managerial or professional roles (compared to 27% borough-wide) and approximately 23% working primarily at or from home.

Major employers located within the parish boundaries include:

- Waltham Petcare Science Institute (formerly the Waltham Centre for Pet Nutrition): Operated by Mars, Incorporated on Freeby Lane, employing approximately 500 staff.
- Twinlakes Theme Park: Employing up to 220 staff during peak seasons (50 core staff).
- Waltham Care Home: Located at Waltham Hall
- R&R Country Ltd: Equestrian and outdoor country retail business
- Waltham C of E Primary School & Pre-School

Smaller commercial ventures include Fairfield Industrial Estate (hosting light industrial and commercial units), agricultural operations, Welby Medical Practice, Waltham Deli, The Royal Horseshoes public house, Melton Golf Club, and equestrian facilities such as Fox Field Stud and Spur Farm.

== Community and leisure ==
=== Amenities ===
Local amenities include:

- Waltham Pre-School (Ofsted 'Outstanding') and Waltham C of E Primary School (Ofsted 'Good')
- Village halls at Waltham and Thorpe Arnold
- Post office and deli at Waltham
- Historic churches at Waltham and Thorpe Arnold
- The Royal Horseshoes public house
- Scout Headquarters, playing fields, and children's playgrounds
- Allotment sites on High Street and Mill Lane
- Parish Council-owned Community Orchard on Goadby Road
- Waltham Hall retirement home and Lake View Court apartments
- Welby Medical Practice

=== Recreation and tourism ===
The parish offers:

- Walking routes across the Wolds, including the Mowbray Way
- NCN route 64 along the south-western boundary
- Twinlakes Theme Park
- Local sports facilities and short-term holiday rentals

=== Events ===
The annual Waltham Charter Fair continues a tradition dating back to the 1227 charter granted by Henry III. Other community events include the Mayday Fête, Christmas Market at Waltham Village Hall, Orchard volunteer sessions, the June Swift Walk, and the Children’s Tractor Run.

== Landmarks ==
=== Conservation areas ===
Waltham on the Wolds contains a designated conservation area.

=== Listed buildings ===
The parish contains 34 statutory listed buildings alongside non-designated local heritage assets.

==== Grade I and Grade II* ====
- Church of St Mary Magdalene, Waltham on the Wolds (Grade I) – A 13th/14th-century church with Norman origins, a 15th-century tower and clerestory, and an 1850 nave expansion by George Gilbert Scott.
- Church of St Mary the Virgin, Thorpe Arnold (Grade II*) – Positioned on a hillside, featuring a 15th-century western tower constructed from ironstone and a Norman font dated to c. 1170 depicting a warrior slaying dragons.

==== Grade II (32 buildings) ====
Key listed structures include:

- Waltham C of E Primary School: Elizabethan-style schoolhouse built in 1844–1845 from ashlar limestone.
- The Royal Horseshoes Inn: Mid-17th-century thatched limestone public house.
- Waltham Windmill: Brick tower mill erected in 1868 on Mill Lane.
- Thaxia Cottage: 17th/18th-century ironstone cottage with eyebrow dormers and thatch on Church Lane.
- The Hall (Thorpe Arnold): Late 18th-century Flemish bond red brick farmhouse on Lag Lane with limestone dressings and hipped slate roof.
- Five 19th-century cast-iron mileposts along Melton Road.

=== Other features ===
Landmarks include the Waltham War Memorial, the Waltham Water Tower, and the Waltham transmitting station, a major broadcast site south-west of Waltham on the Wolds that provides television and radio signals across the East Midlands.

== Transport ==
In 2011, 95% of commuting workers (397 people) relied on private motor vehicles or vans, with public transport accounting for 3% due to limited rural bus connectivity. The A607 trunk road carries significant freight traffic through both villages. High Street and Goadby Road in Waltham experience parking congestion and speeding, while Lag Lane in Thorpe Arnold serves as a narrow bypass route around central Melton Mowbray.

== Education ==
The parish contains Waltham on the Wolds Church of England Primary School, serving local catchment villages including Eastwell, Eaton, Chadwell, Branston, Bescaby, and Stonesby. Secondary education is accessed in Bottesford and Melton Mowbray.

== Religious sites ==
St Mary Magdalene Church in Waltham on the Wolds features a spired central tower visible across the Wolds, retaining 12th-century Norman work within its transepts, a 13th-century nave, 14th-century aisles, a 12th-century font, and carved sedilia.

St Mary the Virgin in Thorpe Arnold contains an ancient tub font decorated with reliefs of St Michael fighting a dragon, with early records dating its original church charter to 1162.

== Sport ==
Melton Mowbray Golf Club lies within the southern part of the parish off Waltham Road near Thorpe Arnold, offering an 18-hole course originally established with nine holes in 1925 and expanded in 1991. Thorpe Arnold Cricket Club, founded in 1922, plays in the Leicestershire County Division 3 League. Some indoor sports and activities are held at the Waltham village hall.

== Notable people ==
- Immanuel Bourne (1590–1672), Puritan clergyman and author, Rector of Waltham on the Wolds
- John Towne (1732–1791), Anglican priest and theologian, Vicar at Thorpe Arnold
- Henry Twells (1823–1900), Anglican clergyman, hymn writer and poet, Rector of Waltham on the Wolds (1868–1870)
- Hugh Gillett (1836–1920), Anglican clergyman and author, born at Waltham on the Wolds
- Stephanus Grobler (born 1982), South African cricketer, played for Thorpe Arnold Cricket Club

== See also ==
- Melton Mowbray
- Belvoir Castle
- Twinlakes Theme Park
