= Hartopp =

Hartopp is a surname. Notable people with the surname include:

- Hartopp baronets
- Sir Edmund Cradock-Hartopp, 1st Baronet
- Edward Hartopp (disambiguation), multiple people
- Sir John Hartopp, 3rd Baronet, English politician
- William Hartopp (1836–1874), English cricketer and soldier
