= Garthorpe, Leicestershire =

Village in Leicestershire, England

Coordinates: 52.779°N 0.767°W

Garthorpe
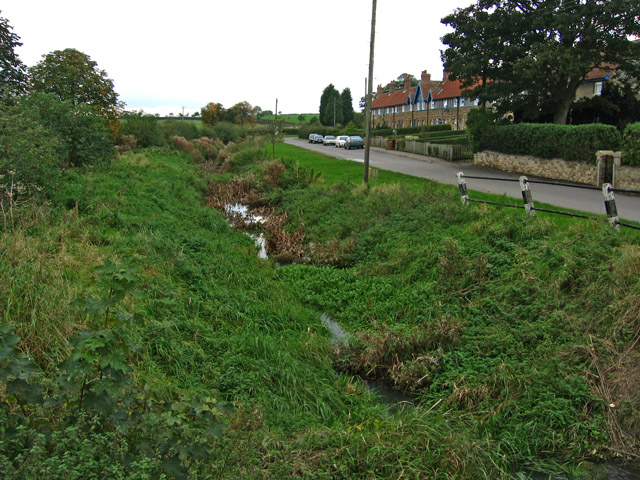
- The River Eye passing through Garthorpe

- Location within Leicestershire
- Population: 418 (2011 Census)
- Civil parish: Garthorpe
- District: Melton
- Shire county: Leicestershire
- Region: East Midlands
- Country: England
- Sovereign state: United Kingdom
- Post town: Melton Mowbray
- Postcode district: LE14
- Police: Leicestershire
- Fire: Leicestershire
- Ambulance: East Midlands
- UK Parliament: Melton and Syston

Garthorpe is a village and civil parish (sometimes called Garthorpe and Coston) in Leicestershire, England, in the Melton district. It is about five miles east of Melton Mowbray. The parish includes the villages of Garthorpe and Coston, and is near Saxby (in Freeby parish), Wymondham, Buckminster and Sproxton.

The village's name means 'farm/settlement with an enclosure'. The village is positioned at the confluence of two watercourses, therefore another suggestion is 'farm/settlement on a triangular piece of land'.

The civil parish had a population of 418 at the 2011 census.

St Mary's Church is a redundant Church of England parish church in the care of the Churches Conservation Trust. The building is Grade I listed.
