= Edward Hartopp =

Edward Hartopp may refer to:

- Sir Edward Hartopp, 1st Baronet (c.1583–1652), of the Hartopp baronets, MP for Leicestershire
- Sir Edward Hartopp, 2nd Baronet (c.1608–1658), of the Hartopp baronets
- Edward Bourchier Hartopp (1808–68), English Conservative MP for North Leicestershire 1859–68
- Edward Hartopp (cricketer) (1820–1894), English cricketer

== See also ==
- Hartopp (surname)
