= River Eye, Leicestershire =

River in north-eastern Leicestershire, England

Coordinates: 52.7629°N 0.9053°W

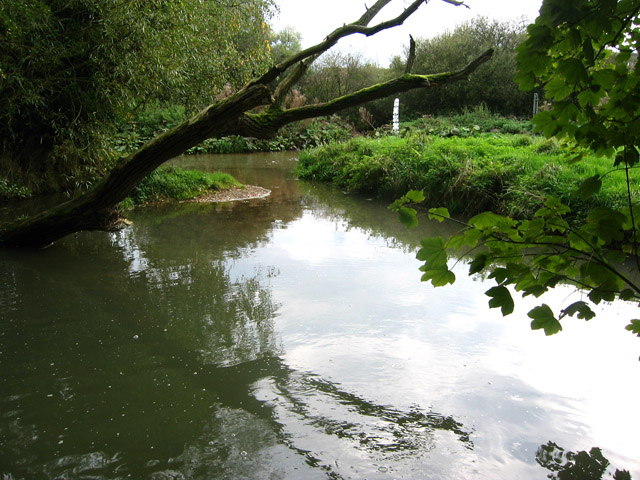
The Eye near Coston.

The River Eye is a slender, slow-flowing river in north-eastern Leicestershire, England. The river is known to flood periodically; especially within the town Melton Mowbray. Fine sediments from agricultural fields, the biggest known cause for the floods, have been recognized as a major source to the channel's supply. The river meanders throughout north-east Leicestershire where is it primarily flanked by farmland, and only crosses a handful of villages/towns. The primary wooded area it crosses is the fox covert. The farming in the district is largely made up of pasturing sheep and cows. Stilton and Red Leicester cheeses originally came from the villages and dairy farms in the Eye basin.

== History ==
The name Eye comes from the Old English word ēa, meaning "the river". Wreake is Danish in origin, meaning the twisting or meandering one.

=== Iron Age Remains ===
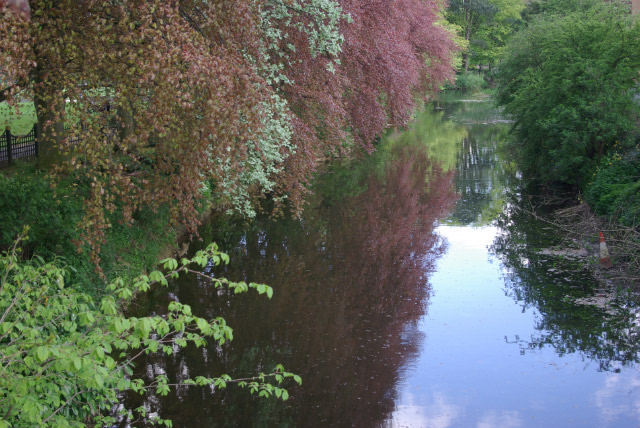
River Eye as seen in Melton Mowbray.

The river has been the center of human activity for many centuries. To the north-east, at Saltby Heath, are King Lud's Entrenchments, which may date from prehistoric times. The Entrenchments lie just inside the county boundary with Lincolnshire, possibly a territorial frontier. The county boundary follows the watershed between the River Eye and River Witham, and is marked by the ancient route from south-east England to the north, known as Sewstern Lane or The Drift.

About six miles south of the river at Melton Mowbray lie the remains of an Iron Age hill fort at Burrough Hill. This may have been the tribal center for the Corieltauvi people who lived in the East Midland counties of Leicester, Lincoln, Nottingham, and Rutland. There is a presumed prehistoric trackway from Burrough Hill northward towards Melton Mowbray, where it crosses the River Eye and heads north towards the Vale of Belvoir. In Roman times, the tribal centre was moved to Leicester, which the Romans named Ratis (or Ratae) Corieltauvorum.

=== Danish and Saxon villages ===
Nine of the villages bordering the river have Danish names, with the rest being Saxon. It is likely that these incomers used the river to reach their new homes. All these villages are likely to have been sited on dry ground close to a good source of water. The River Eye provided this source. Stapleford means 'the ford (over the River Eye) marked by posts' and indicates that the lanes around the Eye were in use twelve hundred years or so ago.

Melton Mowbray appears to have become the Eye basin's trading centre in Saxon times. Its market probably predates the Norman Conquest and is one of the few in England listed in the Domesday Book (1085). Melton continues as the main trading centre in the area throughout medieval times, up to the present day.

=== Nineteenth century ===
The Eye valley was used by the Oakham Canal when it was built early in the nineteenth century. The stretch of the river from Stapleford to Sysonby (about six miles, 10 km) was canalised. There are a few sparse remains of the canal, although the river has largely reverted to its natural state. In 1844 the Midland Railway built the Syston and Peterborough Railway alongside the canal. It had to buy out the canal company as part of the agreement to build the railway. The Midland Railway allowed the canal to fall into disrepair because it was the major competitor to its new route.

== Flow and locations ==
The Eye rises at Bescaby, about six miles north-east of Melton Mowbray. It flows east towards Saltby, where it turns south and flows past Sproxton, Coston and Garthorpe. At Saxby it turns west and flows by Stapleford, Freeby, Wyfordby, Brentingby and Thorpe Arnold. At Swan's Nest it enters Melton Mowbray, where it flows under bridges at Burton Road and Leicester Road. It then passes Sysonby, where, at Egerton Lodge, it changes its name to the River Wreake, which then flows into the River Soar. Its full journey is about 13 miles (21 km).

== Present ==
Today, the River Eye is a relatively unknown part of the English landscape. It is still vital as a water source and drainage route, and has a leisure focus for fishermen and walkers on the nearby rights of way nearby. The Eye has given its name to the UK's radio station 103, which has been broadcasting to Melton Mowbray and Vale of Belvoir since 2005.
