= Saltby =

Village in Leicestershire, England

Coordinates: 52.8293°N 0.7300°W

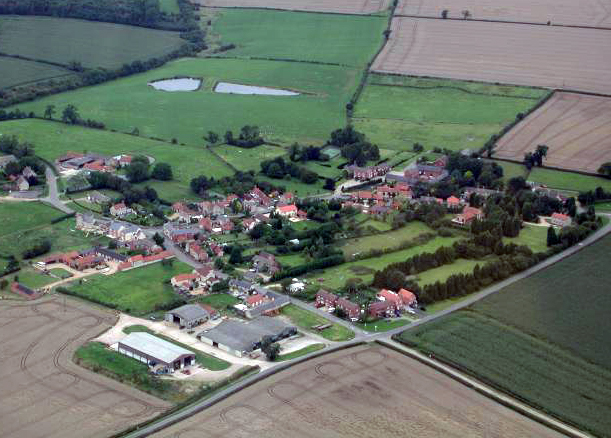
- A view over Saltby

- Location within Leicestershire
- OS grid reference: SK855265
- Civil parish: Sproxton
- District: Melton
- Shire county: Leicestershire
- Region: East Midlands
- Country: England
- Sovereign state: United Kingdom
- Post town: MELTON MOWBRAY
- Postcode district: LE14
- Dialling code: 01476
- Police: Leicestershire
- Fire: Leicestershire
- Ambulance: East Midlands

Saltby is a village and former civil parish, now in the parish of Sproxton, in the Melton borough of Leicestershire, England. It lies close to the River Eye and the border with Lincolnshire. There are approximately 65 properties (2021) within the village. In 1931 the parish had a population of 170. On 1 April 1936 the parish was abolished and merged with Sproxton.

The village includes the former RAF Saltby. The 13th to 15th-century parish church of St Peter is a grade II* listed building.

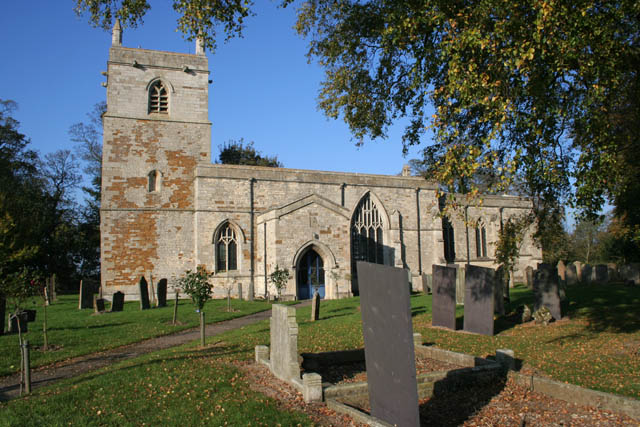
St Peter's church

Nearby places are Waltham on the Wolds, Croxton Kerrial, Coston, Buckminster, and Skillington (in Lincolnshire).
