= Bescaby =

Hamlet in Leicestershire, England

Coordinates: 52.82°N 00.78°W

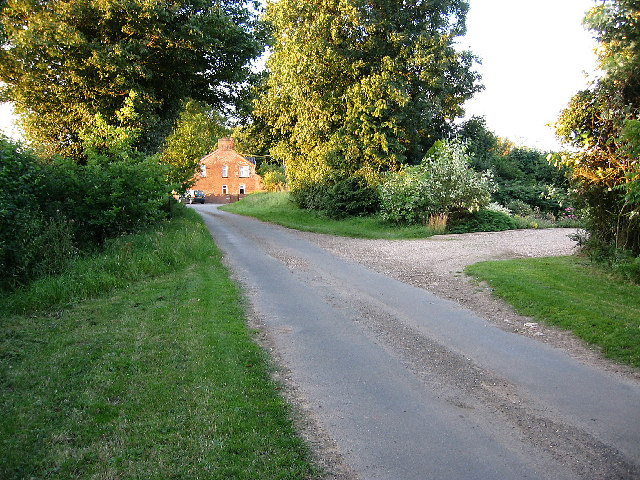
- Bescaby in August 2005

- Location within Leicestershire
- OS grid reference: SK819263
- Civil parish: Sproxton
- District: Melton
- Shire county: Leicestershire
- Region: East Midlands
- Country: England
- Sovereign state: United Kingdom
- Post town: Melton Mowbray
- Postcode district: LE14
- Police: Leicestershire
- Fire: Leicestershire
- Ambulance: East Midlands

Bescaby is a hamlet, deserted medieval village and former civil parish, now in the parish of Sproxton, in the Melton district, in Leicestershire, England. In 1931 the parish had a population of 17.

The hamlet of Bescaby lies close to Waltham-on-the-Wolds, Stonesby & Croxton Kerrial. Bescaby was formerly an ex-parochial manor, in 1858 it became a civil parish belonging to the Dukes of Rutland, and in 1871 had a population of 31 persons, living in 4 houses, on about 1,200 acres (4.9 km^{2}) of land. On 1 April 1936 the parish was abolished and merged with Sproxton. It was previously the demesne of Croxton Abbey, near which stood some extensive buildings, surrounded by a moat. Traces of these buildings are still to be seen near a place called Friars' Walk. William Furnival held the manor in 1382.

The chief branch of the river Eye has its source in the locality, near Bescaby Oaks. It is a ‘fine spring of hard water which flows in front of Bescaby House, the residence of John Edward Bright.

Bescaby was part of the Melton Mowbray Union, which comprised 56 parishes. The union workhouse, built in 1836 was situated on the east side of Melton Mowbray and was capable of housing 250 inmates. The 1871 census shows 126 paupers in residence.
