= Stonesby =

Village in Leicestershire, England

Coordinates: 52.811838°N 0.775112°W

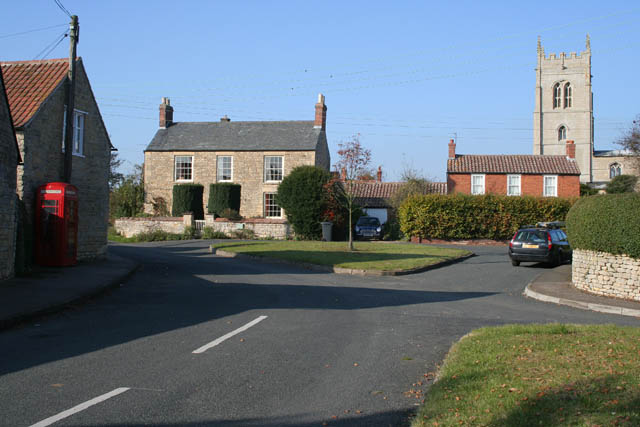
- Stonesby's village green

- Location within Leicestershire
- OS grid reference: SK825245
- Civil parish: Sproxton
- District: Melton
- Shire county: Leicestershire
- Region: East Midlands
- Country: England
- Sovereign state: United Kingdom
- Post town: MELTON MOWBRAY
- Postcode district: LE14
- Dialling code: 01664
- Police: Leicestershire
- Fire: Leicestershire
- Ambulance: East Midlands
- UK Parliament: Melton and Syston

Stonesby is a village and former civil parish, now in the parish of Sproxton, within the Melton borough of Leicestershire, England. It is 6 miles (9.7 km) northeast of Melton Mowbray, and 1.5 miles (2.4 km) southeast of Waltham on the Wolds. In 1931 the parish had a population of 140.

Stonesby broadly consists of a small number of limestone habitats concentrated around the local parish church, set amongst a broad area of arable land.

== Governance ==
From a very early time, Stonesby formed an ancient parish within the Framland hundred of the historic county boundaries of Leicestershire, though was abolished as a parish on 1 April 1936 and merged with Sproxton. Between 1894 and 1935, it lay within the Melton Mowbray Rural District, and from 1935 to 1974, within the Melton and Belvoir Rural District.

Since 1974, Stonesby has formed part of the Melton borough of Leicestershire.

== Other ==
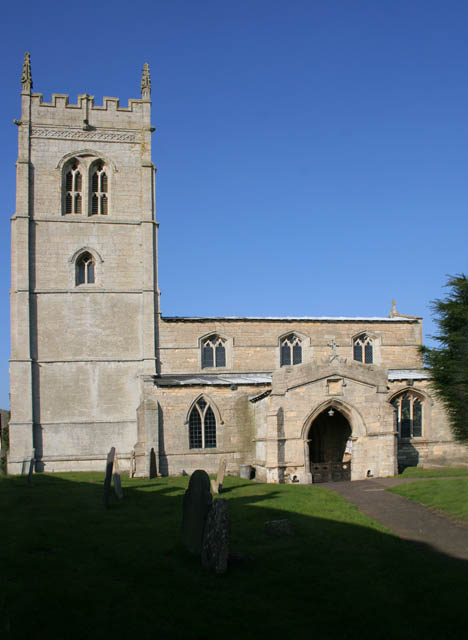
St Peter's church

The 14th-century parish church is dedicated to Saint Peter. It was renovated in 1875 by R.W. Johnson and is a Grade II* listed building
