= Croxton Abbey =

Monastery in Leicestershire, England

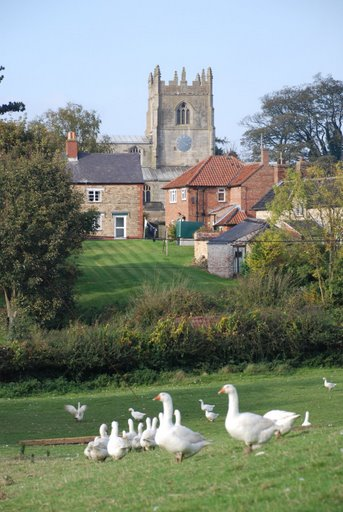

- Location within Leicestershire

Monastery information
- Order: Premonstratensian
- Established: Land donated before 1159; Canons in residence from 1162
- Mother house: Newhouse Abbey
- Dedication: St John the Evangelist
- Diocese: Diocese of Lincoln
- Controlled churches: Ault Hucknall, Derbs; Croxton Kerrial, Leics; Finedon, Northans; Lowne, Derbs; Mellinge, Lancs; South Croxton, Leics (one half); Sproxton, Leics; Tunstall, Lancs

People
- Founder: William, Count of Boulogne and Mortain
- Important associated figures: King John of England (reign: 1199 – 1216): His heart was buried within the abbey church.

Site
- Location: Near Croxton Kerrial, Leicestershire, United Kingdom
- Coordinates: 52°51′5.59″N 0°45′27.96″W

Croxton Abbey, near Croxton Kerrial, Leicestershire, was a Premonstratensian monastery founded by William I, Count of Boulogne.

== History ==
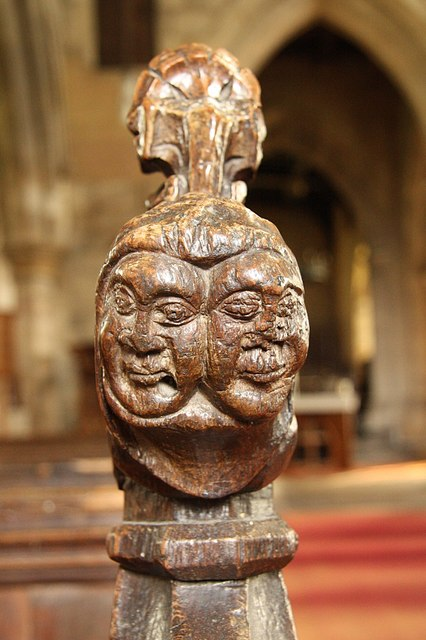
15th-century sisters. Detail of one of the poppy-head bench ends in St Botolph and St John the Baptist's church showing the faces of two women, thought to be sisters from Waltham who were generous benefactors of Croxton Abbey.

Croxton Abbey was founded by William, Count of Boulogne and Mortain, who donated the land for the abbey and endowed it the advowsons of the church of Croxton Kerrial in Leicestershire, and the churches of Ault Hucknall and Lowne in Derbyshire. The donation of the land must have happened before the Count's death in 1159, however, canons were not resident until 1162. Croxton was under the control of their motherhouse, Newhouse Abbey in Lincolnshire.

Later donations brought Croxton the advowsons of the church of Sproxton and one half of the church of South Croxton, both in Leicestershire. The abbey also gained the advowsons of the churches of Mellinge and Tunstall in Lancashire. In the early 13th century Philip d'Aubigny donated the manor of Waltham-on-the-Wolds in Leicestershire, to the abbey.

For a short time the abbey also controlled several daughter houses: acquiring Blanchland Priory in Northumberland, Cockersand Priory in Lancashire, and Hornby Priory in Lancashire. Cockersand was only under the Abbey's control for around 8 years until it was elevated to abbey status itself in 1192. Blanchland remained a daughter house until the 13th century, when it too became an independent abbey. Hornby Priory was the exception, and remained under Croxton until dissolution.

In 1216 the Abbot of Croxton Abbey was summoned to Newark Castle where King John lay dying. The abbot heard the king's confession and, following his death, embalmed the king's body. King John's heart was buried in Croxton Abbey church. His son, King Henry III, later made a number of donations to the abbey in memory of his father.

The abbey suffered heavily in the 14th century. In June 1326 the abbey church, cloisters and some other buildings were burnt down, killing one canon. This, coupled with the devastation of the abbey's possessions in the North of England by Scottish raiders, led to the house being a staggering £2,000 in debt by 1348. Further misfortune was brought by the Black Death which killed all of the abbey's senior canons, except for the abbot and prior.

There were also gains during the 14th century, with the acquisition of the manor of Croxton Kerrial around 1335, and the advowson of the church of Finedon, Northamptonshire, in 1346. Around 1362 Sir Andrew Louterel donated the manors of Bescaby and Saltby, both in Leicestershire.

Towards the end of monastic life at the abbey, there was a serious disagreement between its patron, Lord Berkeley, concerning the election for a new abbot which the patron tried to prevent by force until his demands for payment of £500 by the monastery were met. The election was finally allowed to occur, despite the refusal to pay this money. The new (and last) abbot of Croxton was however forced to pay £160, plus hand over a bond for a further £160.

The heart of King John I (1166-1216) was buried in the Abbey.

=== Dissolution and beyond ===
The abbey was dissolved in 1538, with the abbot and eighteen canons in residence. Henry Manners, 2nd Earl of Rutland preserved "the monumental remains of his ancestors, by transferring them chiefly to Bottesford", from Croxton and Belvoir Priory.

A private house on the site, New Park House, contains elements of a monastic building, probably part of the former guest house once used for wealthy visitors to the abbey. Otherwise, there are no visible remains.

== Layout ==
The abbey church was a simple cruciform shape without aisles, 209 feet (64 m) in length. In the 13th century a presbytery was added at the east end, extending the church to 209.5 feet (63.9 m) in length. The abbey had a small cloister, a chapterhouse, kitchen, a refectory (frater) and a dormitory (dorter). A guest house was added in the 14th century.

== Abbots of Croxton ==
- Alan, transferred to Blanchland in 1165.
- William, occurs 1177.
- Adam, occurs from 1202 to 1221.
- Elyas, occurs from 1228 to 1231.
- Ralph of Lincoln, restored 1230–31, occurs 1240.
- Geoffrey, elected 12414–2, occurs 1268.
- William of Graham, elected 1274, occurs 1280–81.
- William of Huntingdon, occurs 1285.
- William of Brackleye, occurs 1319.
- William, occurs from 1342 to 1348.
- Thomas of Loughtburgh, occurs from 1351 to 1374.
- John Grantham, occurs 1398.
- John of Skotyltorp, occurs 1401 and 1402.
- William, occurs 1408–09.
- William Overton, occurs 1417.
- Adam of Berforthe, elected 1421.
- John Eston, occurs from 1425 to 1444.
- Robert, occurs 1448.
- John Arghume, elected 1473, died 1491.
- Elias Atterclyff, elected 1491, occurs to 1529.
- Thomas Greene, elected 1534, surrendered the abbey, 1538.

== See also ==
- Abbeys and priories in England
