= King Lud's Entrenchments and The Drift =

Coordinates: 52.842°N 0.721°W

- Site of Special Scientific Interest
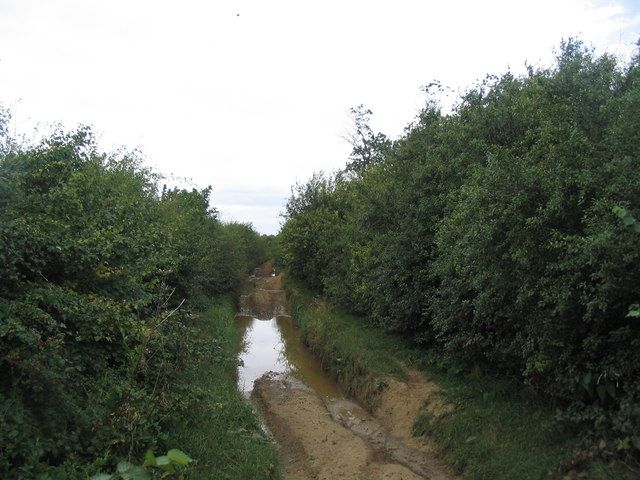
- Location of King Lud's Entrenchments and The Drift.
- Area of search: Leicestershire; Lincolnshire
- Grid reference: SK 864 282
- Interest: Biological
- Area: 23.9 hectares (59 acres)
- Notification date: 1984
- Location map: Magic Map

King Lud's Entrenchments and The Drift is a 23.9 hectares (59 acres) biological Site of Special Scientific Interest which straddles the border between Lincolnshire and Leicestershire, and is east of Croxton Kerrial. King Lud's Entrenchments is a scheduled monument.

King Lud's Entrenchments is also known as King Lud's Intrenchments or King Lud's Banks. The site has not been excavated and its date is unknown. It has been thought of as a Saxon boundary ditch, but aerial photographic work has suggested that it may be part of an extensive prehistoric boundary system extending from Northamptonshire to the Humber and termed `the Jurassic spine'.

This site has limestone grassland with tor-grass, cock's foot, crested dog's-tail and red fescue. Herbs include salad burnet, field scabious, germander speedwell and perforate St John's-wort, and there is also some broad-leaved semi-natural woodland.

There is access to the site and The Drift is part of the Viking Way long-distance trail.
