= Belvoir Rural District =

Former local government area in the UK

Coordinates: 52.93°N 0.80°W

Belvoir was a rural district in Leicestershire, England from 1894 to 1935.

It was formed under the Local Government Act 1894 from the part of the Grantham Rural Sanitary District that was in Leicestershire. It was a small district, named after the village of Belvoir and contained nine parishes:

- Barkestone
- Belvoir
- Bottesford
- Croxton Kerrial
- Harston
- Knipton
- Muston
- Plungar
- Redmile

Under the County Review Orders of the 1930s it was merged with the Melton Rural District to form the Melton and Belvoir Rural District. The merger took effect in 1935.
