= Cradock-Hartopp baronets =

- Escutcheon of the Cradock-Hartopp baronets
- Creation date: 1796
- Status: extinct
- Extinction date: 2000
- Seats: Keepers, Yeovilton

The Cradock-Hartopp baronetcy, of Freathby in the County of Leicester and of Four Oaks Hall in the County of Warwick, was a title in the Baronetage of Great Britain. It was created on 12 May 1796 for Edmund Cradock-Hartopp. Born Edmund Bunney, he was the husband of Anne Hurlock, granddaughter and heiress of Sir John Hartopp, 4th Baronet, of Freathby (a title which had become extinct in 1762; see Hartopp baronets). On his marriage in 1777 he assumed the surname of Cradock-Hartopp in lieu of his patronymic according to the wills of his uncle Joseph Cradock and his wife's grandfather. He was Member of Parliament for Leicestershire from 1798 to 1806.

His eldest surviving son Edmund, the 2nd Baronet was High Sheriff of Leicestershire in 1838. He died childless and was succeeded by his younger brother, William, the 3rd Baronet. The title became extinct in 2000 on the death of the 10th Baronet.

== Cradock-Hartopp baronets, of Freathby and Four Oak Hall (1796) ==
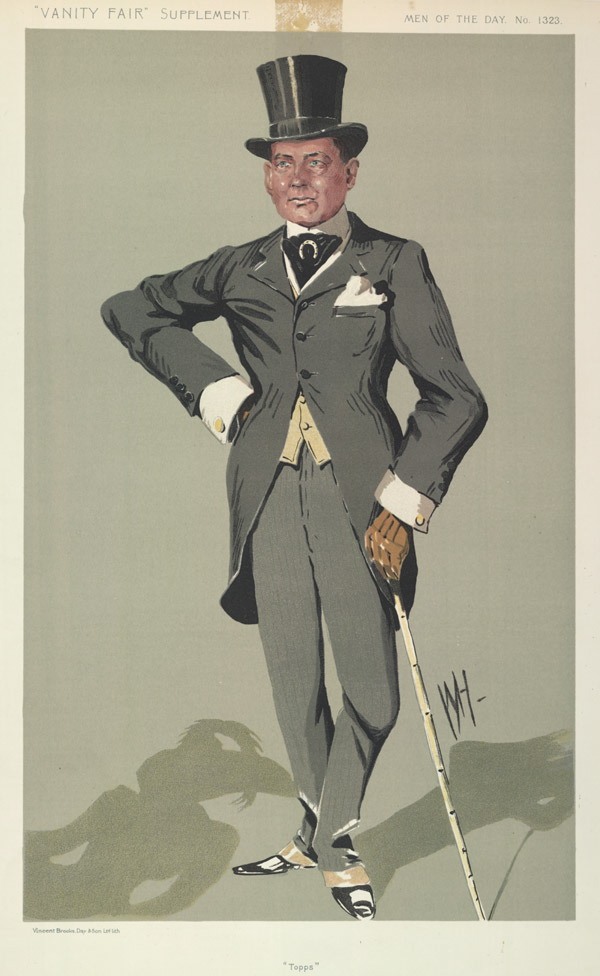
"Topps". Caricature of the 5th Baronet by WH published in Vanity Fair in 1912

- Sir Edmund Cradock-Hartopp, 1st Baronet (1749–1833). High Sheriff of Leicestershire for 1781.
- Sir Edmund Cradock-Hartopp, 2nd Baronet (1789–1849).
- Sir William Edmund Cradock-Hartopp, 3rd Baronet (1797–16 October 1864). Cradock-Hartopp was born at Four Oaks Hall, Sutton Coldfield, the son of Sir Edmund Cradock-Hartopp, 1st Baronet, and Anne Hurlock. He succeeded to the baronetcy in 1849 on the death of his brother Sir Edmund Cradock-Hartopp, 2nd Baronet. He lived at Four Oaks Hall, Sutton Coldfield and was Warden (equivalent to mayor) of that town in 1835. He was High Sheriff of Warwickshire in 1853. Cradock-Hartopp married Jane Mary Keane and was succeeded by his son John. Edmund and Jane's daughter, Mildred Anne (1827–1909), married Sir Francis Scott, 3rd Baronet in 1854.
- Sir John William Cradock-Hartopp, 4th Baronet (1829 – 25 May 1888). Cradock-Hartopp was the son of Sir William Edmund Cradock-Hartopp, 3rd Baronet, and Jane Mary Keane. He succeeded in the baronetcy on the death of his father in 1864. In 1873 he acquired Kingswood Warren House and estate at Kingswood, Surrey which he extended and improved with the assistance of architect William Basset Smith. He had become party to an 1877 lawsuit relating to Enclosure but when in 1884 his lawyers became insolvent and absconded, his involvement caused his own bankruptcy, and the house and estate were sold in 1885. The house became the headquarters of the BBC Research Department in 1948. Cradock-Hartopp married Charlotte Francis Howard in 1855 and was succeeded by his son Charles.
- Sir Charles Edward Cradock-Hartopp, 5th Baronet (1858–1929)
- Sir Charles William Everard Cradock-Hartopp, 6th Baronet (1893–1930). Nephew of the fifth Baronet. He was in the Diplomatic Service. He died unmarried at an early age and was succeeded by his uncle, Frederick, the seventh Baronet.
- Sir Frederick Cradock-Hartopp, 7th Baronet (1869–1937).
- Sir George Francis Fleetwood Cradock-Hartopp, 8th Baronet (1870–1949). He was childless and on his death in 1949 the line of the fourth Baronet failed. The late Baronet was succeeded by his first cousin once removed, John, the ninth Baronet.
- Sir John Edmund Cradock-Hartopp, 9th Baronet (1912–1996). He was the grandson of Edmund Charles Cradock-Hartopp, youngest son of the third Baronet. He died without male issue in 1996 and was succeeded by his first cousin, Kenneth, the tenth Baronet.
- Sir Kenneth Alston Cradock-Hartopp, 10th Baronet (1918–2000). He left no heir.

== See also ==
- Hartopp baronets

== Notes ==
Baronetage of Great Britain
Preceded by Amcotts baronets	Cradock-Hartopp baronets of Freathby and Four Oaks Hall; 12 May 1796	Succeeded by Turton baronets
