= Hornby Priory =

Monastery in Lancashire, England

- Location within the City of Lancaster district
- Interactive map of Hornby Priory

Monastery information
- Order: Premonstratensian
- Mother house: Croxton Abbey
- Dedication: Wilfrid

People
- Founder: De Montbegon family

Site
- Coordinates: 54.112956°N 2.636805°W
- Grid reference: SD584684

Hornby Priory was an English Premonstratensian monastic house in Hornby, Lancashire. Dedicated to St Wilfrid, the priory was a dependent cell of Croxton Abbey in Leicestershire. It was probably founded by Roger de Montbegon of Hornby, otherwise his father Adam or grandfather Roger.

It was suppressed on 23 February 1536, by Richard Leighton and Thomas Legh, following the Suppression of Religious Houses Act 1535.

In 1544 Thomas Stanley, 2nd Baron Monteagle and Henry Croft bought the site of Hornby Priory.

== See also ==
- List of monastic houses in Lancashire
