= Sir John Hartopp, 3rd Baronet =

English politician

Sir John Hartopp, 3rd Baronet (1637?–1722) was an English politician, a nonconformist and early Whig.

== Life ==
Born about 1637, he was the only son of Sir Edward Hartopp, 2nd Baronet, of Freeby, Leicestershire, by Mary, daughter of Sir John Coke, of Melbourne, Derbyshire. He succeeded as third baronet in 1658. When in London, of which he became an alderman, he attended the Independent meeting-house in Leadenhall Street, over which John Owen presided, and continued a member under successive ministers until his death.

Hartopp represented Leicestershire in the parliaments of 1678–9, 1679, and 1680–1. He strongly supported the Exclusion Bill in 1681. Under James II he was heavily fined for nonconformity. He died on 1 April 1722, aged 85, and was buried on the 11th in Stoke Newington Church beside his wife, who had died on 9 November 1711. Isaac Watts, who resided with the Hartopps for five years at Stoke Newington, preached their funeral sermons.

== Legacy ==
In early life Hartopp used to take down in shorthand sermons, so that he might read them to his family. Thirteen sermons of John Owen, preserved in this way, were published by Hartopp's granddaughter, Mrs. Cooke, in 1756.

By his will, Hartopp left £10,000 for the instruction of youth as preparation towards the dissenting ministry. His heirs, however, took advantage of a legal flaw in the conveyance, and appropriated the bequest to themselves. Nearly one half of the legacy was eventually restored, and applied to the use for which it was originally intended.

== Family ==
By his marriage with Elizabeth, daughter of Charles Fleetwood, Hartopp inherited Fleetwood's house. The estate sat at the intersection of Stoke Newington Church Street and Ermine Street, the old Roman road leading north from the City of London. He is thought to have had a family of four sons and nine daughters.

His son and successor, John (1680?–1762), with whom the baronetcy became extinct, assisted Lady Mary Abney in erecting a monument over Watts's remains in Bunhill Fields. He had two daughters. Elizabeth married Timothy Dallowe, the physician and chemist. Anne married Joseph Hurlock, and their only child was Anne Hurlock "eventually heir and representative of the Hartopps"

One of Sir John Hartopp's daughters was Frances, who married Nathaniel Gould (1661–1728), merchant, politician, shipbuilder, and a Governor of the Bank of England from 1711 to 1713 at the time when the South Sea Company was founded. The Goulds lived at Fleetwood House. One of their children married Thomas Cooke, also Governor of the Bank of England from 1737 to 1740. Mary Gould married Sir Francis St John, of Thorpe Hall (Peterborough), a descendant of the Roundhead Oliver St John

== Notes ==
Attribution

This article incorporates text from a publication now in the public domain: Stephen, Leslie; Lee, Sidney, eds. (1891). "Hartopp, John". Dictionary of National Biography. Vol. 25. London: Smith, Elder & Co.

Parliament of England
Preceded by Lord Roos; The Lord Sherard	Member of Parliament for Leicestershire; 1679–1685; With: The Lord Sherard	Succeeded by John Verney; The Lord Sherard
Baronetage of England
Preceded by Edward Hartopp	Baronet (of Freathby); 1658–1722	Succeeded by John Hartopp
