= Edmund Cradock-Hartopp =

British politician

Sir Edmund Cradock-Hartopp, 1st Baronet (21 April 1749 – 10 June 1833) was a British baronet and politician.

== Life ==
Born Edmund Bunney, he was the son of Joseph Bunney and Mary Cradock in Freathby, Leicestershire.

He married in 1777, Anne, the daughter of Joseph Hurlock, Governor of Bencoolen and one of the Directors of the East India Company. Her mother was Anne, daughter of Sir John Hartopp, last of the Hartopp baronets. Upon his marriage, Edmund Bunney changed his name to Cradock-Hartopp, as required by the wills of his maternal uncle Joseph Cradock and his wife's maternal grandfather.

He was High Sheriff of Leicestershire for 1781 and Member of Parliament for Leicestershire between 1798 and 1806. In 1792 he acquired Four Oaks Hall, Sutton Coldfield, the town of which he was briefly Warden in 1823. He was awarded the Cradock-Hartopp baronetcy in 1796.

He died in Bristol in 1833 and was succeeded by his eldest surviving son Edmund.

== Notes ==
Parliament of Great Britain
Preceded by William Pochin; George Anthony Legh-Keck	Member of Parliament for Leicestershire; 1798–1801; With: George Anthony Legh-Keck	Succeeded by Parliament of the United Kingdom
Parliament of the United Kingdom
Preceded by Parliament of Great Britain	Member of Parliament for Leicestershire; 1801–1806; With: George Anthony Legh-Keck	Succeeded by George Anthony Legh-Keck; Lord Robert Manners
Baronetage of Great Britain
New creation	Baronet (of Freathby); 1796–1833	Succeeded by Edmund Cradock-Hartopp
