= Sproxton, Leicestershire =

Village in Leicestershire, England

Coordinates: 52.81137°N 0.730609°W

Sproxton
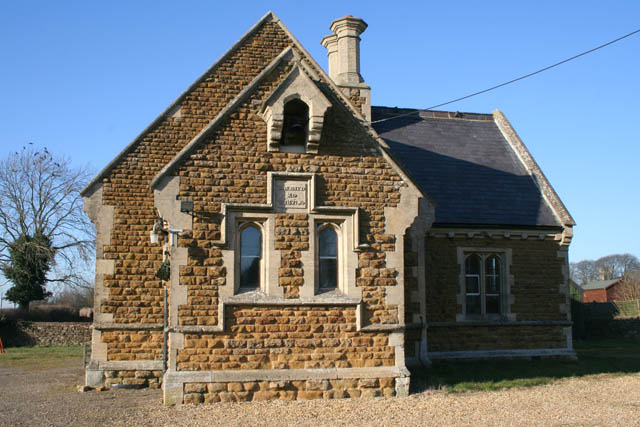
- Sproxton Village Hall

- Location within Leicestershire
- Population: 658 (2011)
- OS grid reference: SK855245
- Civil parish: Sproxton
- District: Melton
- Shire county: Leicestershire
- Region: East Midlands
- Country: England
- Sovereign state: United Kingdom
- Post town: MELTON MOWBRAY
- Postcode district: LE14
- Dialling code: 01476
- Police: Leicestershire
- Fire: Leicestershire
- Ambulance: East Midlands
- UK Parliament: Melton and Syston

Sproxton (/ˈsproʊsən/) is a village and civil parish within the Borough of Melton in Leicestershire, England, close to the border with Lincolnshire. It has approximately 80 occupied dwellings (2021) and a population of 480, rising to 658 (including Coston, Saltby and Stonesby) at the 2011 census.

The village and civil parish are not coterminous; the parish includes the villages of Sproxton, Saltby, Stonesby, Bescaby, and the former RAF Saltby. The River Eye runs through the parish. Nearby places are Waltham on the Wolds, Croxton Kerrial, Coston, Buckminster, and Skillington (in Lincolnshire).

The Viking Way runs close by. Nearby is Sproxton Quarry Site of Special Scientific Interest.

The 14th-century parish church of St Bartholomew, extended and restored in 1882 by architect Henry Woodyer, is a Grade II* listed building. There is evidence of Norman building in the west wall of the south aisle and the tower is 13th-century. The top part of the tower was rebuilt in the restoration of 1882. There is a Saxon cross in the churchyard - the only complete one in Leicestershire.

A post mill stood at Sproxton. The mill was rebuilt in 1889 after it blew down and killed the miller. Wakes & Lamb of Newark rebuilt the mill using materials from the old mill and from one at Castle Bytham. It was wrecked by the gales of March 1916, but repaired. By 1920 it was out of use and was demolished in 1949 when owned by Mr T.A.Mount.

== Quarrying ==
Quarrying for iron ore was carried out at Sproxton from 1925 to 1973 and for limestone from 1965 to 1969. The stone was taken away by a railway, construction of which was started in about 1922 by the Great Northern Railway. The line was an extension of the branch from the main line at High Dyke to Stainby. The terminus was on the east side of the Sproxton to Saltby road. It was planned to extend the line to Waltham Station but this extension was never opened.

The first quarry was for iron ore close to the road between the railway and Sproxton Church and worked its way eastwards until 1961. The quarry was extended eastwards and southwards between 1965 and 1968 but for the getting of limestone rather than iron ore. A second iron ore quarry operated on the south side of the Skillington road between 1961 and 1973, again working eastwards. A further iron ore quarry was worked on the north side of the railway between 1962 and 1963 again working eastward from the Saltby road. The ore was taken to the railway by standard gauge tramways, worked by horses from 1925 to 1928, then by a petrol engined locomotive and from 1931 by steam locomotives. From 1961 some of the ore was taken to the railway by lorry and from October 1963 the last of the tramways was abandoned and all of the stone was taken to the railway by lorry. Steam quarrying machines were used until 1940 when electric and diesel machines were introduced.

Some of the quarried area has been restored for agriculture (in places it looks hummocky). Some has been forested and the final gullets and the limestone quarry remain. There are traces of the railway and tipping dock.
