= Joseph Hurlock =

- Born: c. 1715
- Died: 1793
- Occupation: Director of the East India Company

Joseph Hurlock (c.1715 – 1793) was a director of the East India Company.

== Life ==
Hurlock became a writer for British Bencoolen on 23 October 1730. One of his sureties with the East India Company was Joseph Hurlock the London surgeon, and Shirren takes him to be a relation; he mentions also some Hurlocks buried in a Chelsea Moravian Church cemetery as possibly related.

It was 12 July 1731 when Hurlock arrived on the coast of Sumatra. In 1745 he was resident at Moco Moco facing the threat of escaped slaves. He was later deputy-governor at Fort Marlborough, the main Bencoolen fortification, from 1746 to 1752. His successor was Robert Hindley, who paid substantially for Hurlock's resignation.

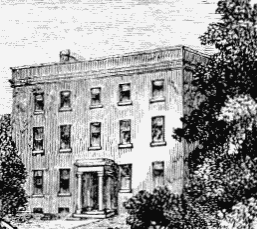
Fleetwood House, Stoke Newington, in 1750

Hurlock returned to England in 1752, on board the Onslow, captain Thomas Hinde. He married, and resided at Fleetwood House, the home of the Hartopp family. After his wife's death in 1766, the house was let out. He subsequently lived in John Street, London. At the end of his life he was at Lindsey House, 99 Cheyne Walk, Chelsea.

Hurlock was an East India Company director in 1768, and again later. He was a Fellow of the Royal Society and involved with the Society of Arts as a committee chairman. He was buried at Stoke Newington on 15 August 1793, having died aged 78. A monument was created to him, in Stoke Newington Church, by Thomas Banks for his daughter Ann. It records his date of death as 10 August.

== Family ==
Hurlock married in June 1755 Sarah Hartopp, daughter of Sir John Hartopp, 4th Baronet, who died in 1766. Their daughter Anne married Edmund Bunney, later known as Edmund Cradock-Hartopp.
