= Skillington =

Village and civil parish in the South Kesteven district of Lincolnshire, England

Coordinates: 52.822630°N 0.669695°W

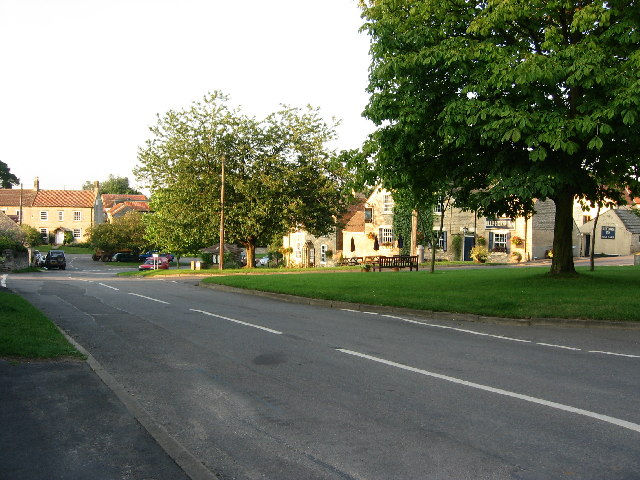
- Skillington village

- Location within Lincolnshire
- Population: 314 (2021)
- OS grid reference: SK897258
  - London: 95 mi (153 km) S
- District: South Kesteven
- Shire county: Lincolnshire
- Region: East Midlands
- Country: England
- Sovereign state: United Kingdom
- Post town: Grantham
- Postcode district: NG33
- Police: Lincolnshire
- Fire: Lincolnshire
- Ambulance: East Midlands
- UK Parliament: Rutland and Stamford

Skillington is a village and civil parish in the South Kesteven district of Lincolnshire, England. The population of the civil parish at the 2021 census was 314. It is situated 1.5 miles (2.4 km) west from the A1 road, 6 miles (10 km) south from Grantham, and is within 3 miles (5 km) of the Leicestershire border.

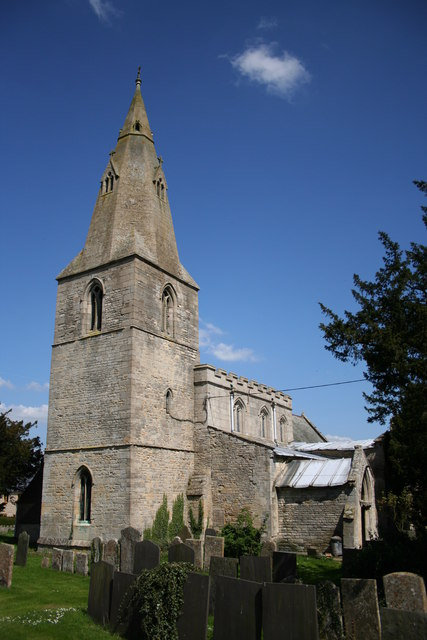
St James' church

Nearby villages include Buckminster, Sproxton, Stainby, Sewstern, Colsterworth and Woolsthorpe-by-Colsterworth, with the latter the birthplace of Sir Isaac Newton.

The parish church is a Grade I listed building dedicated to Saint James. It dates from the 11th century and is built of limestone. The tower dates from the 13th century. The vestry was added in the 19th century. The font is 14th-century, and there is a 17th-century oak chest. Built into the north wall of the chancel are two 13th-century grave slabs, one re-used in memory of John Bowfield, who died in 1730. There are two stained glass windows to the memory of the Rev Charles Hudson, vicar, killed on the Matterhorn in 1865.
