= Melton Rural District =

Former local government area in the UK

Coordinates: 52.8°N 0.9°W

Melton was a rural district in Leicestershire, England from 1894 to 1935.

It was created in 1894 under the Local Government Act 1894 as a successor to the Melton Rural Sanitary District. It entirely surrounded, but did not include, Melton Mowbray

Under the County Review Orders of the 1930s it was merged with the Belvoir Rural District to form a larger Melton and Belvoir Rural District, with Eye Kettleby and parts of other parishes going to Melton Mowbray Urban District.
