= John Towne =

English archdeacon

John Towne (1711?–1791) was an English churchman and controversialist, archdeacon of Stow from 1765.

== Life ==
Born about 1711, was educated at Clare Hall, Cambridge, where he graduated B.A. in 1732 and M.A. in 1736.

Towne became vicar of Thorpe-Ernald, Leicestershire, on 22 June 1740, and archdeacon of Stowe in 1765. He was a prebendary of Lincoln Cathedral, and rector of Little Paunton, Lincolnshire. He was a friend of William Warburton.

Towne died on 15 March 1791 at Little Paunton, where he was buried, a mural tablet being erected to his memory in the church. By his wife Anne, who died on 31 January 1754, he left three daughters and one son, who became a painter and died young.

== Works ==
His works are:

- A Critical Inquiry into the Opinions and Practice of the Ancient Philosophers, concerning the nature of the Soul and a Future State, and their method of teaching by the double doctrine, (anon.), London, 1747. With a preface by William Warburton; 2nd edit. London, 1748.
- The Argument of the Divine Legation, fairly stated and returned to the Deists, to whom it was originally addressed’ London, 1751. Defence of Warburton's The Divine Legation of Moses.
- A Free and Candid Examination of the Principles advanced in the … Bishop of London's … Sermons, lately published; and in his … Discourses on Prophecy (anon.), London, 1756. To Thomas Sherlock.
- Dissertation on the Antient Mysteries, London, 1766.
- Remarks on Dr. Lowth's Letter to the Bishop of Gloucester. With the Bishop's Appendix, and the second Epistolary Correspondence between his Lordship and the Doctor annexed (anon.), 2 pts. London, 1766. On the debate of Warburton with Robert Lowth.
- Exposition of the Orthodox System of Civil Rights, and Church Power; addressed to Dr. Stebbing. To Henry Stebbing.

== Notes ==
Attribution

This article incorporates text from a publication now in the public domain: "Towne, John". Dictionary of National Biography. London: Smith, Elder & Co. 1885–1900.
