= Edward Hartopp (cricketer) =

English cricketer

Personal information
- Full name: Edward Samuel Evans Hartopp
- Born: 7 September 1820; Thurnby, Leicestershire, England
- Died: 5 October 1894 (aged 74); South Pickenham, Norfolk, England
- Role: Batsman

Domestic team information
- Years: Team
- 1841–1842: Cambridge University
- 1842–1852: Marylebone Cricket Club (MCC)
- First-class debut: 13 May 1841 Cambridge University v Cambridge Town Club
- Last First-class: 22 August 1857 Gentlemen of England v Gentlemen of Kent and Sussex

Career statistics
| Competition | First-class |
|---|---|
| Matches | 69 |
| Runs scored | 442 |
| Batting average | 4.25 |
| 100s/50s | –/– |
| Top score | 22 |
| Balls bowled | unknown |
| Wickets | 1 |
| Bowling average | unknown |
| 5 wickets in innings | – |
| 10 wickets in match | – |
| Best bowling | 1/? |
| Catches/stumpings | 16/– |
- Source: CricketArchive, 4 June 2014

Edward Samuel Evans Hartopp (7 September 1820 – 5 October 1894) was an English first-class cricketer who played for Cambridge University, Nottinghamshire and several amateur cricket teams between 1841 and 1857. He was born at Thurnby, Leicestershire and died at Pickenham Hall, near Swaffham, Norfolk.

== Cricket career ==
Hartopp appeared in several matches for Cambridge University in both 1841 and 1842, including, in each of these seasons, the University Match against Oxford University. In his Cambridge games, he batted regularly at the tail-end of the batting order, and he does not appear to have bowled or kept wicket. From 1842 onwards, he started playing for Marylebone Cricket Club and he made 36 appearances for that team over the next 10 years; he also played in 1843 for Nottinghamshire and a team representing the Midland Counties, and he started appearing also for "Gentlemen of England" teams of amateurs which played various county sides or other amateur combinations. In 1851, he appeared for the Gentlemen in the annual match against the Players at Lord's.

In 1844 and 1845 Hartopp played in 11 first-class matches in each season; a leading cricketer of the period, such as Alfred Mynn, played in a very similar number of major matches. Yet Hartopp remained a singularly unsuccessful cricketer, usually batting at the tail-end and bowling only twice in his career, and his career batting average over 69 first-class matches is just 4.25. His highest score in 120 first-class innings was 22, made in one of his occasional forays to the top of the batting order in an MCC match against Oxford University in 1846 in which the whole team had been dismissed for 24 in the first innings. From 1853 to 1857, he played in only one match per season, with none at all in 1855; in those four games, he batted seven times, and a score of 2 in his final innings in 1857 ended a succession of six ducks.

== Career outside cricket ==
Hartopp was educated at Eton College and at Trinity College, Cambridge. He is described as "of Clipsham Hall, Rutland", but his second marriage was to the daughter of the owner of Pickenham Hall in Norfolk, where he died in 1894. At the time of his death, he was the auditor for the Marylebone Cricket Club's accounts.
