= RAF Saltby =

Former RAF base in Leicestershire, England

RAF Saltby USAAF Station 538
- Saltby, Leicestershire in England
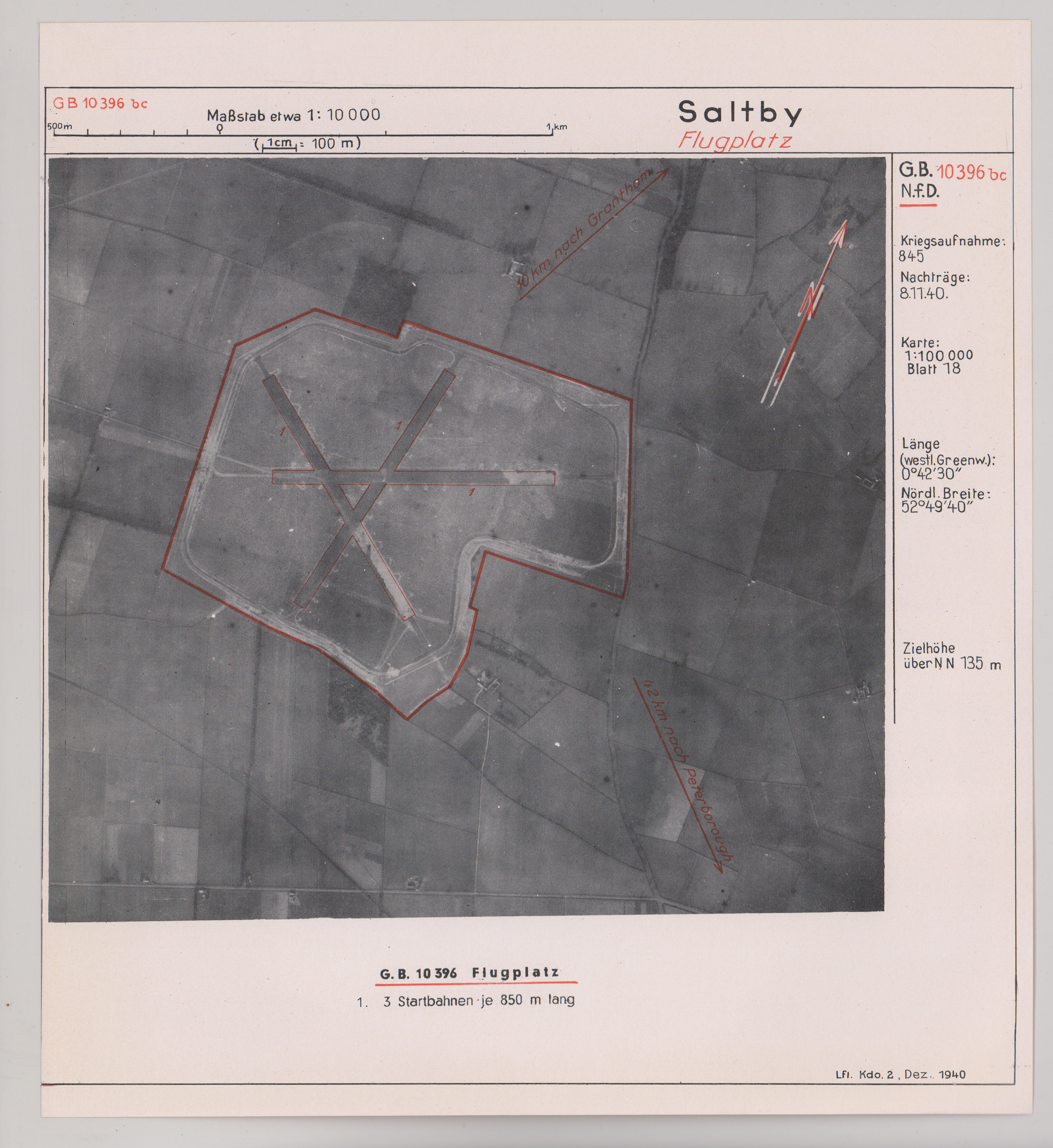
- RAF Saltby on a target dossier of the German Luftwaffe, 1940

Site information
- Owner: Air Ministry
- Operator: Royal Air Force; United States Army Air Forces
- Controlled by: RAF Flying Training Command; Ninth Air Force

Location
- Shown within Leicestershire
- Coordinates: 52°49′44″N 000°42′51″W

Site history
- Built: 1941
- In use: 1941-1948
- Battles/wars: Second World War

Airfield information
Runways
Direction	Length and surface
00/00	Concrete
00/00	Concrete
00/00	Concrete

Royal Air Force Saltby or more simply RAF Saltby is a former Royal Air Force station located near Saltby, Leicestershire, England. It is now home to Buckminster Gliding Club.

The following units were here at some point:

- No. 14 Operational Training Unit RAF
- No. 32 Heavy Glider Maintenance Section
- No. 216 Maintenance Unit RAF
- No. 255 Maintenance Unit RAF
- No. 256 Maintenance Unit RAF
- No. 1665 Heavy Conversion Unit RAF
- 314th Troop Carrier Group
  - 32nd Troop Carrier Squadron
  - 50th Troop Carrier Squadron
  - 61st Troop Carrier Squadron
  - 62nd Troop Carrier Squadron
