= Thorpe Arnold =

Village in Leicestershire, England

Coordinates: 52.7728158°N 0.8589845°W

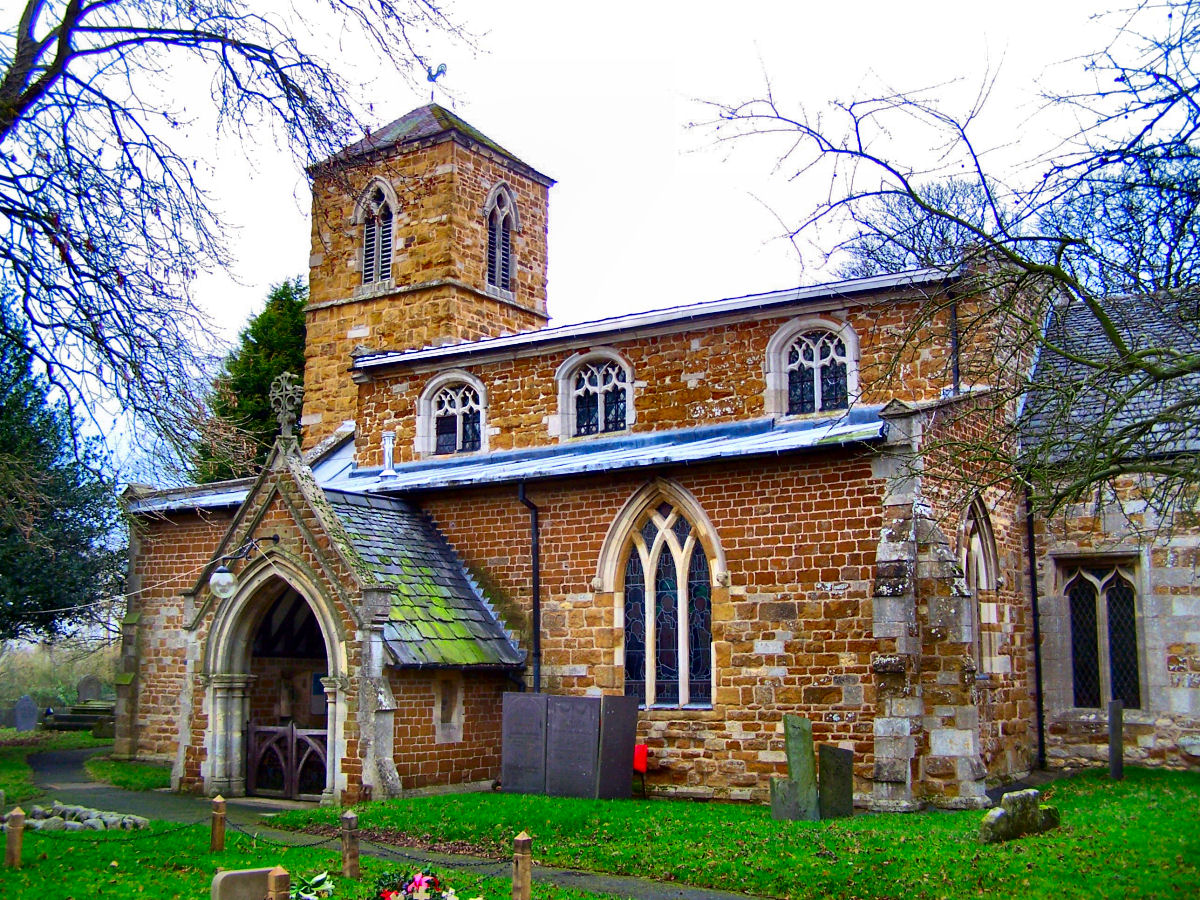
- Church of St Mary the Virgin, Thorpe Arnold

- Location within Leicestershire
- Population: 123 (2011)
- OS grid reference: SK770200
  - London: 105 mi (169 km)
- Civil parish: Waltham on the Wolds and Thorpe Arnold
- District: Melton
- Shire county: Leicestershire
- Region: East Midlands
- Country: England
- Sovereign state: United Kingdom
- Post town: Melton Mowbray
- Postcode district: LE14
- Dialling code: 01664
- Police: Leicestershire
- Fire: Leicestershire
- Ambulance: East Midlands
- UK Parliament: Melton and Syston
- Website: Waltham on the Wolds & Thorpe Arnold Parish Council

Thorpe Arnold is a farming village in the civil parish of Waltham on the Wolds and Thorpe Arnold, in the district of Melton, in Leicestershire, England. It is approximately 1.2 miles (1.9 km) northeast of Melton Mowbray.

== Geography ==
Thorpe Arnold is situated on the top of a hill to the north-east of the town of Melton Mowbray. It has 35 occupied dwellings (2021). Nearby major cities include Leicester 15 miles (24 km), Nottingham 17.5 miles (28.2 km), and Peterborough 28.5 miles (45.9 km).

In 1870–72, John Marius Wilson's Imperial Gazetteer of England and Wales described Thorpe Arnold as follows:

"THORPE-ARNOLD, a parish in Melton-Mowbray district, Leicester; 1¾ mile NE of Melton-Mowbray r. station. Post town, Melton-Mowbray. Acres, 1,742. Real property, £2,811. Pop., 124. Houses, 25. The manor belongs to the Duke of Rutland. The living is a vicarage, united with Brentingby, in the diocese of Peterborough. Value, £400. Patron, the Duke of Rutland. The church is old."

== History ==
Mentioned in the Domesday Book Survey of 1086, Thorpe (Torp) was a settlement in the Hundred of Framland, Leicestershire. It had an estimate population of 48 households in 1086. The Tenant-in-chief, was held by Hugh de Grandmesnil, Sheriff of Leicestershire and Governor of Hampshire, who was richly rewarded by William the Conqueror for his part in the Norman Conquest of England.

Arms of de Bois: Argent, two bars and a canton gules, as depicted by Matthew Paris and in the de Bois Hours

From the 12th century, Thorp is known as Thorp Arnold, having taken the first name of its new owner, Arnold (or Ernauld, Latinised to Hernaldus) de Bois (French: "from the wood/forest") (Latinised to de Bosco ("from the wood/forest")), a vassal of the Earl of Leicester. His successors also used the first name Arnold. The death of Hernaldus de Bosco (Arnold de Bois) in 1255, a Warden of the Forest, is recorded by Matthew Paris in his Historia Anglorum (1250-1259), folio 170 verso. His arms were Argent, two bars and a canton gules.

Arnold I de Bois and his son Arnold II de Bois took an active part in the political life of England and Normandy. Arnold II supported Robert de Beaumont, 2nd Earl of Leicester and was rewarded by the earl with a grant of numerous manors in Leicestershire (including Thorpe Arnold, Brentingby, Evington, Humberstone and Elmesthorpe) and in Warwickshire (Clifton-on-Dunsmoor and Shrewley). The "de Bois" Book of Hours made at Oxford in 1325/30 for Hawise de Bois survives in the Pierpont Morgan Library in New York (MS-M700).

In the 17th century, Thorp Arnold was owned by sir Martin Lister, English politician, whose stepdaughter Frances Thornhurst became the mother of Sarah Churchill, Duchess of Marlborough.

John Towne (1711?–1791) was vicar of Thorpe Arnold before becoming the Archdeacon of Stow 5 September 1765 – 15 March 1791.

In 1931 the parish had a population of 128. On 1 April 1936 the parish was abolished and to form Waltham.

== Sport ==
Thorpe Arnold Cricket Club is an English amateur cricket club that has been based at the ground east of the village on Waltham Road since 1922. The foundation of the club is unknown, but the earliest known photograph of the club dates back to 1902. In 1931, the club entered the Melton & District League, and in 1947, Thorpe Arnold Cricket Club formed its very first junior team.

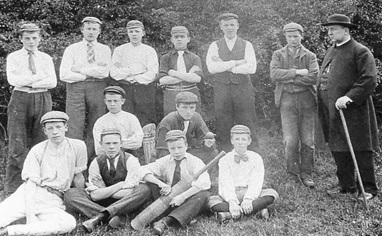
Thorpe Arnold Cricket club in 1902

Thorpe Arnold CC have 2 senior XI teams that compete on Saturdays in the Leicestershire and Rutland Cricket League, a Midweek senior XI team in the Burrough and District Evening League, a Sunday XI team that play friendly matches in and around the local district, and a long established junior training section that play competitive cricket in the Leicestershire Youth League.
