= Melton and Belvoir Rural District =

Rural district in Leicestershire, England

Coordinates: 52.83°N 0.84°W

Melton and Belvoir Rural District was a rural district of Leicestershire, England, from 1935 to 1974.

It was formed on 1 April 1935 from the merger of the Melton Mowbray Rural District and the Belvoir Rural District, with part going to Melton Mowbray urban district also.

On 1 April 1936 there was a significant reorganisation of parishes.

In 1955 the council bought Warwick Lodge on Dalby Road in Melton Mowbray to serve as its headquarters. The building had been built in 1908 as a large house.

21 acres of Broughton and Old Dalby were transferred to Upper Broughton in Bingham Rural District, Nottinghamshire, on 1 April 1965.

In 1974, under the Local Government Act 1972 the district merged with the Melton urban district to form the new non-metropolitan district of Melton.
