= Croxton Kerrial =

Village in Melton borough, Leicestershire, England

Coordinates: 52.856625°N 0.758997°W

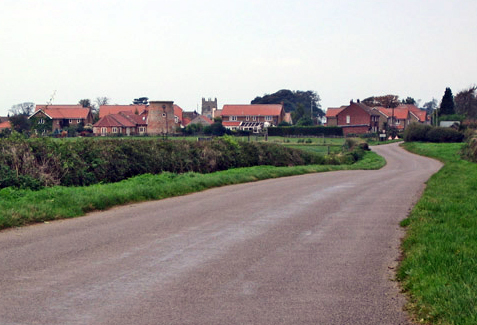

- Location within Leicestershire
- Population: 530 (2011 Census)
- OS grid reference: SK835295
  - London: 97 miles (156 km) SSE
- District: Melton
- Shire county: Leicestershire
- Region: East Midlands
- Country: England
- Sovereign state: United Kingdom
- Post town: GRANTHAM
- Postcode district: NG32
- Dialling code: 01476
- Police: Leicestershire
- Fire: Leicestershire
- Ambulance: East Midlands
- UK Parliament: Melton and Syston

Croxton Kerrial (pronounced [ˈkroʊsən ˈkɛrɨl]) is a village and civil parish in the Melton borough of Leicestershire, England, 6.6 miles (10.6 km) south-west of Grantham, 7.9 miles (12.7 km) north-east of Melton Mowbray, and 0.5 miles (0.8 km) west of Leicestershire's border with Lincolnshire. The civil parish includes the village of Branston and had a population of 530 at the 2011 census.

== History ==
The village's name means "farm/settlement of Krok" or "farm/settlement of a crook".

In medieval times, Croxton Abbey, a Premonstratensian house, lay within the locality. The manor of Croxton was granted (in part-exchange for the manor of Kettleburgh, Suffolk) by King Henry III in May 1242 to Bertram de Criol or Crioill, Lord Warden of the Cinque Ports His seat was at Westenhanger Castle in Stanford, Kent.) The name "Kerrial" derives from him. Nicholas de Crioll, a successor to Bertram as Warden of the Cinque Ports, married the heiress of William de Auberville the younger, whose grandfather in 1192 founded the Premonstratensian abbey of Langdon, near West Langdon, Kent; Leiston Abbey in Suffolk had been founded by his father-in-law Ranulf de Glanville in 1183. On 28 December 1246 the king granted a Monday weekly market to Nicholas de Crioll and his heirs, at his manor of Croxton, and a yearly fair on the vigil, feast and morrow of St Barnabas (June 10–12).

The manor was later in the ownership of the Duke of Rutland.

== Governance ==
Lying across the historical county boundaries of Leicestershire and Lincolnshire from very early times, Croxton Kerrial once formed an ancient parish within the hundred of Framland.

From 1894, Croxton Kerrial formed part of the Belvoir Rural District, until it was amalgamated in 1935 into Melton and Belvoir Rural District, both of which were in the administrative county of Leicestershire. On 1 April 1936 the parish of Branston was abolished and merged with Croxton Kerrial. In 1974, under the provisions of the Local Government Act 1972, Croxton Kerrial was transferred into the newly created non-metropolitan district of Melton, while remaining within Leicestershire county.

== Geography ==
Croxton Kerrial can be described as hilly, its highest point being 500 ft (152 m) above sea level. Much of the land surrounding it is arable farmland.

Nearby are Knipton and Harston (both in Belvoir parish), Belvoir Castle, Hungerton (over the border in Lincolnshire), Eaton and Sproxton. South Croxton is a separate village and civil parish in the Charnwood borough of Leicestershire, named to reflect its position south of Croxton Kerrial.

A local landmark is the Croxton Water Spout, part of an old water system sourced from a local spring, which was refurbished in 2003 as part of the Millennium celebrations.

== Education and worship ==
Croxton Kerrial Church of England Primary School converted to academy status in 2013 under the Leicester Diocese Charitable Trust. An Ofsted report in June 2015 graded the school as good. It had a roll of 73.

The Anglican church, part of the Diocese of Leicester, is dedicated to Saint Botolph and to Saint John the Baptist. There is a former Methodist chapel in the village.

== Sport ==
Croxton Kerrial currently has a senior football team, CK Dons, playing in the Leicester and District Football League. It also has a Sunday cricket team, which plays in the GMCA Division 3.

South-west of the village (beyond Croxton Park) is the disused Croxton Park race course. The last race meeting there was held on 2 April 1914.
