= Freeby =

Village in Leicestershire, England

Coordinates: 52.7727°N 0.8099°W

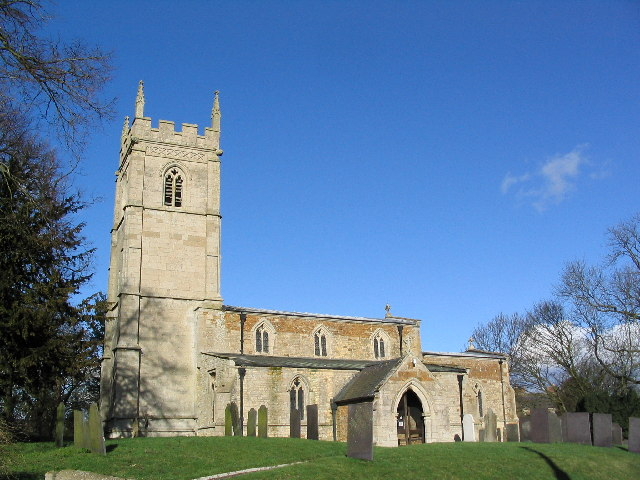
- St Mary's parish church

- Location within Leicestershire
- Population: 244 (2011 Census)
- OS grid reference: SK804201
- Civil parish: Freeby
- District: Melton
- Shire county: Leicestershire
- Region: East Midlands
- Country: England
- Sovereign state: United Kingdom
- Post town: Melton Mowbray
- Postcode district: LE14
- Dialling code: 01664
- Police: Leicestershire
- Fire: Leicestershire
- Ambulance: East Midlands
- UK Parliament: Melton and Syston
- Website: Freeby Parish Council

Freeby is a village and civil parish in the Melton district of Leicestershire, England, about 3 miles (5 km) east of Melton Mowbray. As well as the village of Freeby the civil parish includes the villages of Brentingby, Saxby, Stapleford and Wyfordby. The 2011 Census recorded the parish population as 244.

Isaac Watts lived in the village and preached at the Congregational chapel.

== History ==
The village's name means 'farm/settlement of Fraethi'.

The village was once a part of Melton Mowbray parish. At the time of Edward the Confessor it was known as "Fretheby" and "Fredebi". It was referred to as "Frieby" as late as 1816. All the properties, except the United Reformed Church, still belong to the Freeby estate.

The estate was granted as a manor to Hugh Despencer in the 13th century and is still a manor estate. The estate later passed to Lord de Ros, presumably at the demise of the Despensers. (Hugh the elder was hanged in Bristol in 1326 for his aid to Edward II who had fled the invasion of Isabella and Mortimer: Hugh Despenser the Younger was, after trial, hung, drawn and quartered later the same year). In 1568 the lord of the manor of Freeby was Edward Manners, 3rd Earl of Rutland. 30 years later the manor passed to Thomas Hartopp of that ancient family of Leicestershire. Sir John Hartopp, 3rd Baronet (1658) became MP for Leicestershire (1678–81), employed the non-conformist Isaac Watts and left an endowment for the education of dissenting ministers.

The estate was sold by Sir John William Cradock-Hartopp, 4th Baronet, to Daniel Thwaites (of the Lancashire Thwaites brewery) upon whose death in 1888 it passed to his only daughter, Elma Amy, the wife of Robert Yerburgh, M.P. The estate was part of many others owned by Mrs Yerburgh and under management of the Woodfold Estates Company Management. Mrs Yerburgh died in 1946 and from 1955 the estates and brewery were managed separately from adjacent offices at Eanam, Blackburn.

=== 1960 air accident ===
On Cow Common on 17 June 1960 BAC Jet Provost XM382 crashed, from RAF Syerston. 27 year old Pilot Officer Oliver M. J. Kendrick ejected, into a hedge, in a field owned by Phil Meakins, who gave him a cup of tea. Edward Norgate and Bernard Wright, of Rosewood Cottage, also saw the crash.

Fire engines from Melton and Oakham arrived, working with foam extinguishers. Group Captain G.B. Warner, station commander of Syerston, inspected the site.

== Today ==
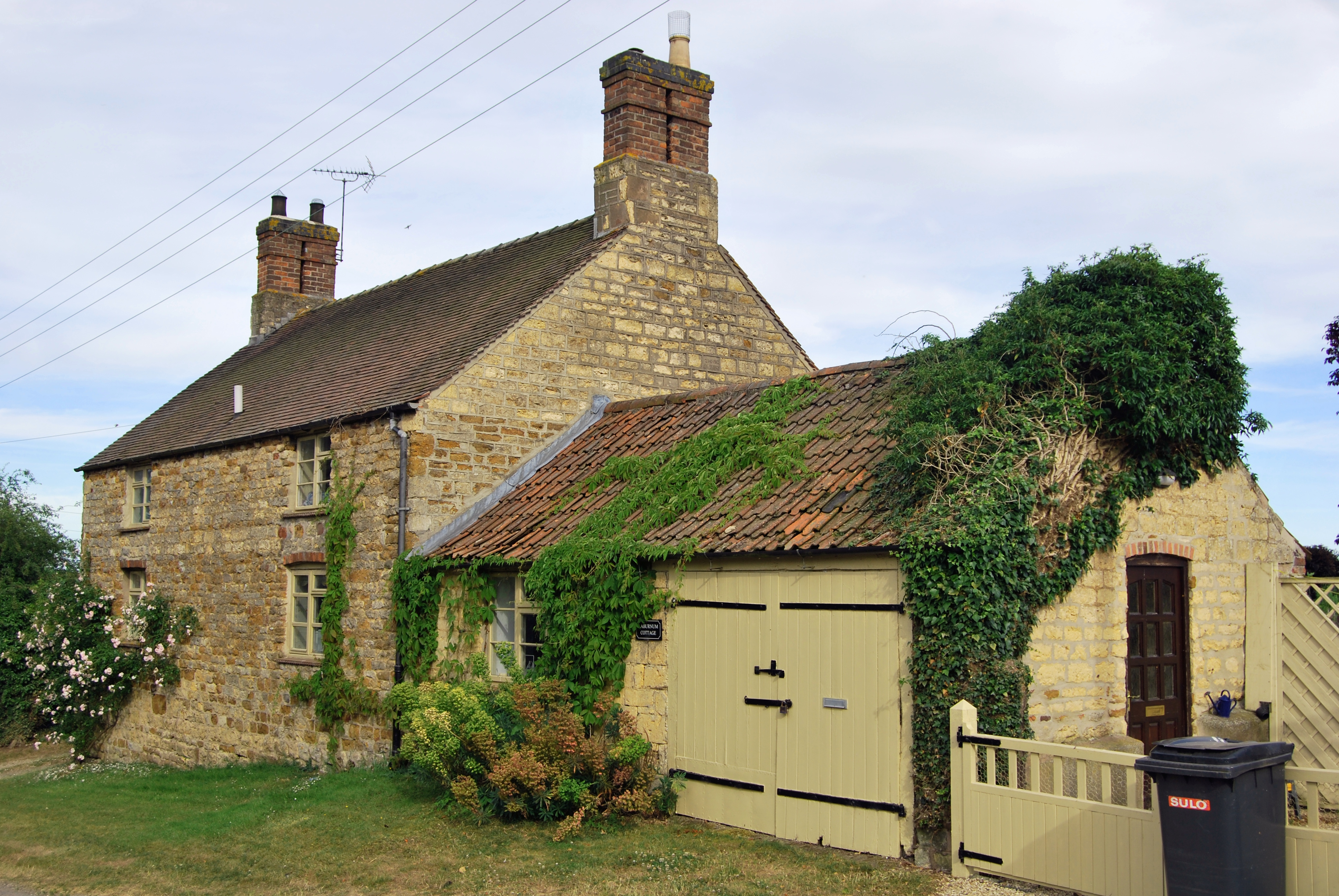
Laburnum Cottage

The buildings in the village show some similarity of age and building style commensurate with estate management. This can be seen in window frames and doors, the use of ironstone and brick building materials with limestone decoration. At the T junction to the west of the village, set upon a bank, is a terrace of six houses called Sykes Row. The red brick and tiled roof construction with decorative window arches are striking. Ivy House Farm, the Old Barn and Woodbine Cottage are opposite and as the road dips down into the village the church can be glimpsed behind the mature trees that border its north and west walls. As the visitor proceeds along the road such cottages as Primrose, Highfield and Laburnum Cottage grace the sides with their unspoilt red brick and tile construction and well kept gardens. Further along Manor Farm and Glen Farm, working farms, display wonderful building features such as working sash windows. The Manor Farmhouse is Grade II listed. Since 1994 Freeby has been under the protection of the Freeby Conservation Area which covers 3.38 hectares sand was designated by Melton Borough Council. The settlement is relatively unspoilt as an agricultural village, certainly worthy of preservation and its buildings and rural nature are a credit to English Heritage. Most of the village, other than some farm buildings, are encompassed in the conservation area.

== Parish church ==
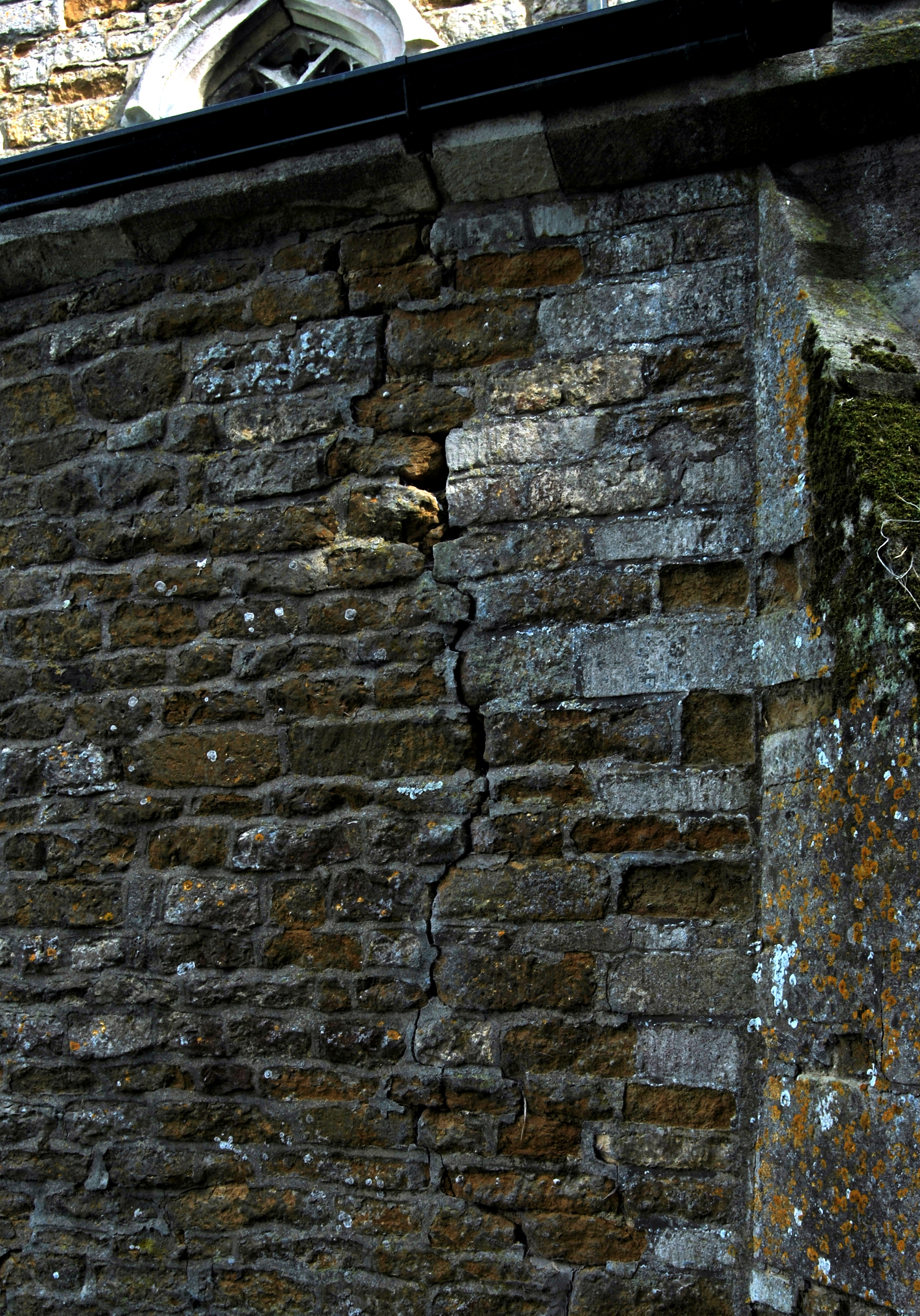
A crack in the north aisle of St Mary's parish church

The oldest parts of the Church of England parish church of St Mary are 14th century. The building is mostly in an Early English style. The parish register starts around 1604 but is fragmented until the beginning of the 19th century. Like so many medieval churches it has been repaired and altered many times, the last thorough restoration around 1894. As with many churches in this area it is built of ironstone and limestone ashlar. The aisles were added some time later and the limestone tower was built in the 16th century. Ornamental medieval corbels adorn each south window and the church has a north door.

The church is on a prominence on the north side of the road through the village and that is apparently its downfall. That hill is not solid rock and, according to a BBC video is sand which has resulted to constant repairs throughout the last 700 years as the church settles.

The church would seat 200 but it has been closed for some time because of its small congregation and its state of repair. English Heritage, after a survey of churches say, "The church serves a small community, who have maintained it extremely well over the years, but some of the stonework needs urgent repairs. English Heritage and the Heritage Lottery Fund is providing a scheme of repair grants to places of worship like St Mary's." The church has been found unsafe and closed. Photographs in the gallery show the extent of the damage to some extent but the author has no access to the interior. There is a preservation order, granted on 24 August 1999 by Melton Borough Council, on a dozen trees on the north side of the churchyard. The church was vested in the Churches Conservation Trust on 15 April 2016.

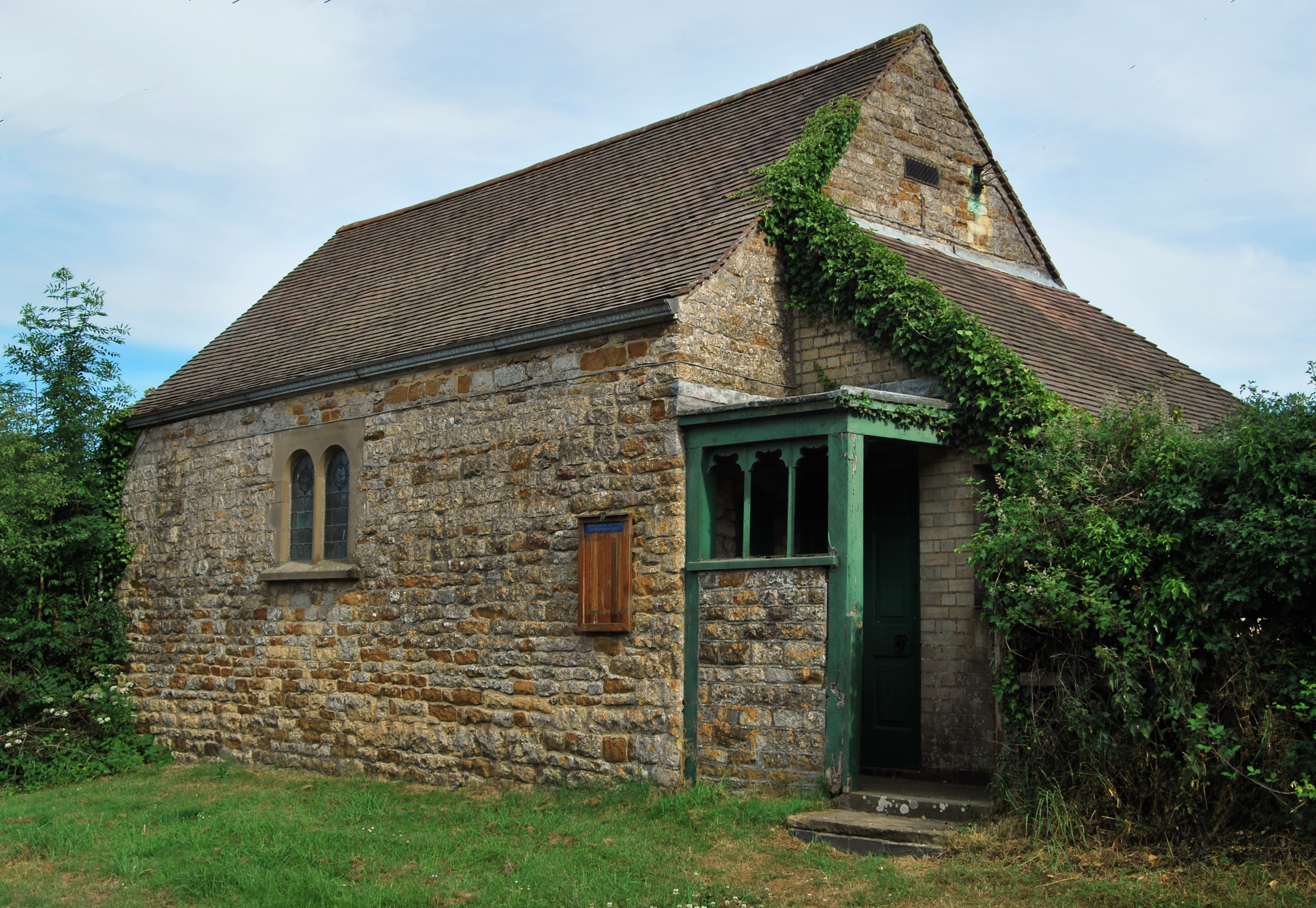
Freeby URC chapel

At present the villagers worship in the chapel, which is a small building a short walk across the road from St Mary's. The chapel was built before 1881. It has a double-arched window and a porch.

== Civil parish ==
The civil parish of Freeby includes Saxby, Stapleford, Wyfordby and Brentingby as well as Freeby itself.

=== Saxby ===
Saxby is a small village in the parish of Freeby. Saxby is one of the Thankful Villages – only 53 of which are known. These villages and parishes sent men to fight in the Great War, 1914-1918, and all of them came back alive. The village is featured on Darren Hayman's album, Thankful Villages Volume 3.

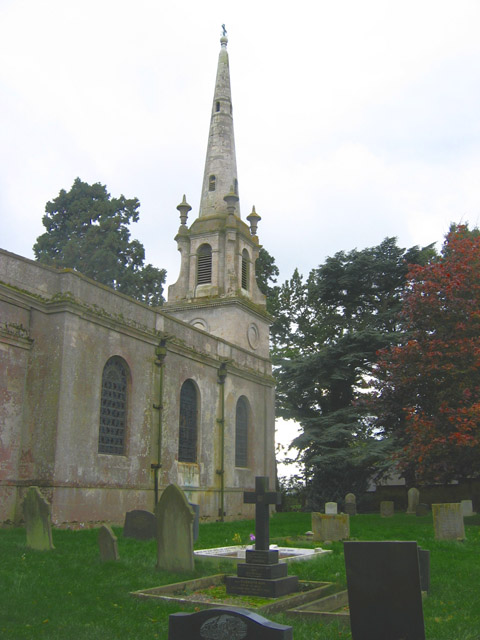
St Peter's parish church, Saxby

St Peter's Church, Saxby is a Grade II* listed building. It was built in 1789 to the designs of George Richardson.

== Notable residents ==
In 1696 the non-conformist cleric and hymn-writer Isaac Watts (1674–1748) was appointed minister to the Hartopp family of Stoke Newington and Freeby. He preached at the Congregational chapel in the village until 1699. The chapel became a United Reformed Church in the early 1970s.

== Bibliography ==
- Pevsner, Nikolaus; Williamson, Elizabeth; Brandwood, Geoffrey (1984) [1960]. Leicestershire and Rutland. The Buildings of England (2nd ed.). Harmondsworth: Penguin Books. pp. 154–155.
