= Hartopp baronets =

Extinct baronetcy in the Baronetage of England

The Baronetcy of Hartopp of Freathby was created in on 3 December 1619 in the Baronetage of England for Edmund Hartopp, High Sheriff of Leicestershire 1618–9. He represented the parliamentary constituency of Leicestershire 1628–9. His grandson, the third Baronet represented the county 1679–81. The Baronetcy became extinct in 1762 when the estates passed by the female line to Cradock-Hartopp.

Escutcheon of the Hartopp baronets of Freathby

== Hartopp baronets, of Freathby (1619) ==
- Sir Edward Hartopp, 1st Baronet (c. 1583–1652)
- Sir Edward Hartopp, 2nd Baronet (c. 1608–1658)
- Sir John Hartopp, 3rd Baronet (1637–1722)
- Sir John Hartopp, 4th Baronet (1680–1762)

== See also ==
- Cradock-Hartopp baronets (1796)
