= Coston, Leicestershire =

Village in Leicestershire, England

Coordinates: 52°47′25″N 0°44′33″W

Coston
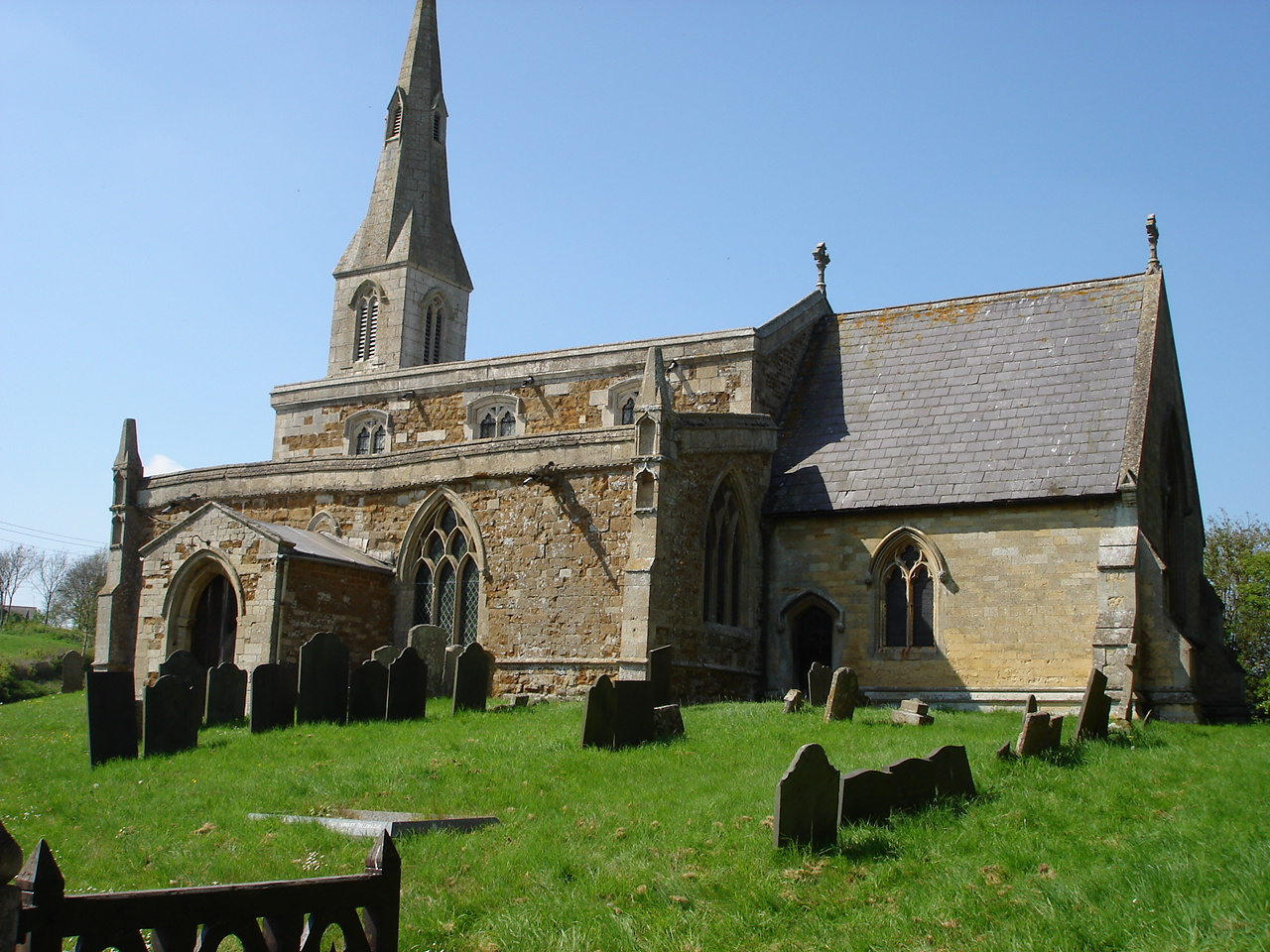
- St Andrew's parish church

- Location within Leicestershire
- Civil parish: Garthorpe
- District: Melton
- Shire county: Leicestershire
- Region: East Midlands
- Country: England
- Sovereign state: United Kingdom

Coston is a village and former civil parish, now in the parish of Garthorpe in the Melton district, in the eastern part of Leicestershire, England. In 1931 the parish had a population of 74.

== History ==
The village's name means 'farm/settlement of Katr'.

On 1 April 1936 the parish was abolished and merged with Garthorpe.

== Church ==
The parish church, dedicated to St Andrew, is thought to date back to the 13th century and was restored in 1846.
