= Melton Carnegie Museum =

Museum in Melton Mowbray, Leicestershire, England

Coordinates: 52°45′52.71″N 0°52′51.52″W

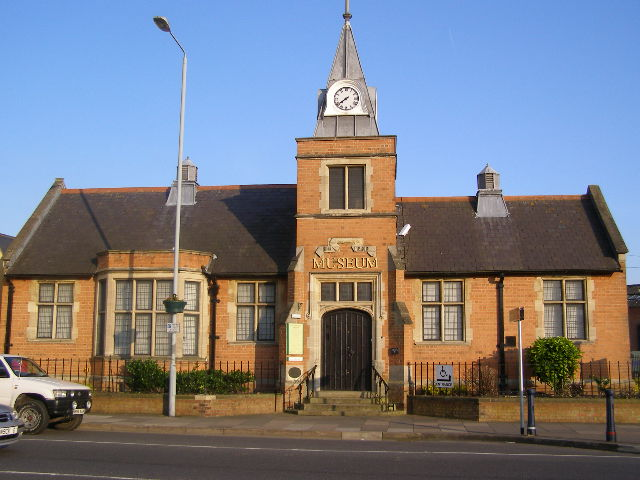
Melton Carnegie Museum

The Melton Carnegie Museum is a museum in Melton Mowbray, Leicestershire, England, which documents the history of the market town. It is managed by Leicestershire County Council and supported by Melton Borough Council and is Heritage Lottery Funded.

== History of the Museum ==
The former Carnegie Library, built in 1905, was refurbished and opened by Leicestershire County Council in 1977 as the Melton Carnegie Museum.

In 1983 the National Museum of Hunting Trust was established. With Melton being a world-renowned centre of fox hunting, the Melton building was intended to incorporate material on hunting. A planned refurbishment of the building, costing some £500,000, gave the opportunity to include a fox-hunting display, celebrated at the re-opening in the speech of Baroness Mallalieu on 3 May 2002.

The museum, which has doubled in size, re-opened in late 2010, following a major building project which created a new gallery, study area and community space.

== The Museum ==
The museum traces the social and economic history of Melton and includes exhibitions on the town's world-renowned Stilton cheese and pork pie industries and accounts of the arguments for and against fox hunting.

The museum also has displays on the history of saddle, shoemaking and tinsmithing and the impact these trades had on the town, as well as how the Romans, Anglo Saxons, Normans, Tudors, Georgians and Victorians would have lived in the area.

The phrase "painting the town red" also has strong local connections.

The Museum is accredited by the Museums, Libraries and Archives Council (MLA).
