= The Epicure's Almanac =

1841 book by Benson Earle Hill

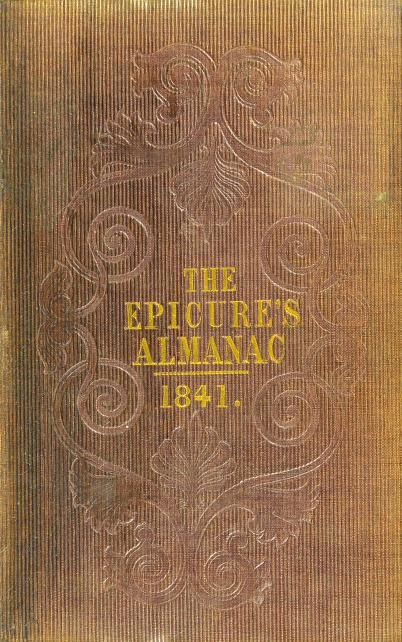
- Cover page for The Epicure's Almanac or Diary of Good Living (1841)
- Author: Benson Earle Hill
- Publication date: 1841
- ISBN: 978-1294522522

The Epicure's Almanac (also known as Diary of Good Living) contained a variety of original or valuable tips for daily life. These tips were gained as a result of the real-life experience of people in their enjoyment of the 'good things in life'. The book was written in 1841 by Benson Earle Hill and published, in London, by How and Parsons. It is now a rare book.

This early nineteenth century book was intended for people who were not rich and could not really afford to go to restaurants. One useful tip was to add bicarbonate of soda to cider to make a 'poor mans champagne'. As a soldier, Hill gained a broad experience of life and hence this book includes recipes like Cheshire pork pie, North Wiltshire cheese, Nag's-head cake, cooked tomatoes, kebabs, coconut and chutneys. The recipes demonstrate the influence that Britain's colonies were beginning to exert on British lifestyle and cuisine. The book was not a great commercial success and hence very few copies have survived.
