= Melton Mowbray =

Town in Leicestershire, England

Coordinates: 52.766087°N 0.888408°W

- Town
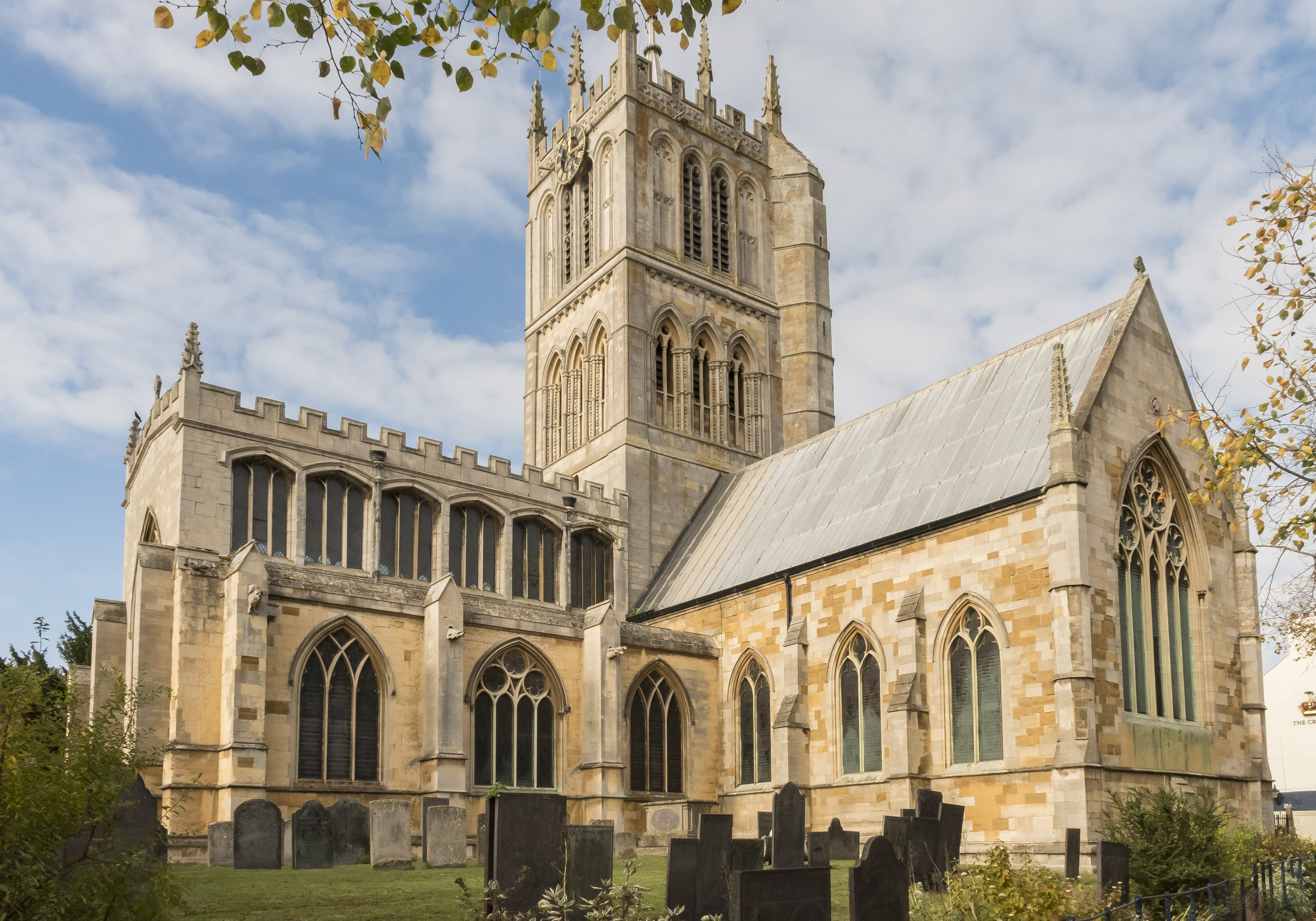
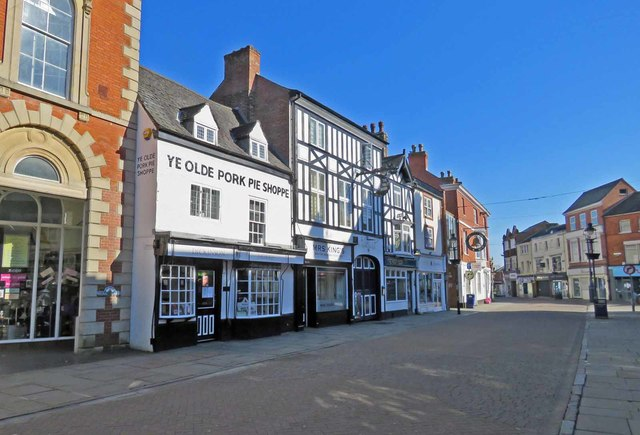
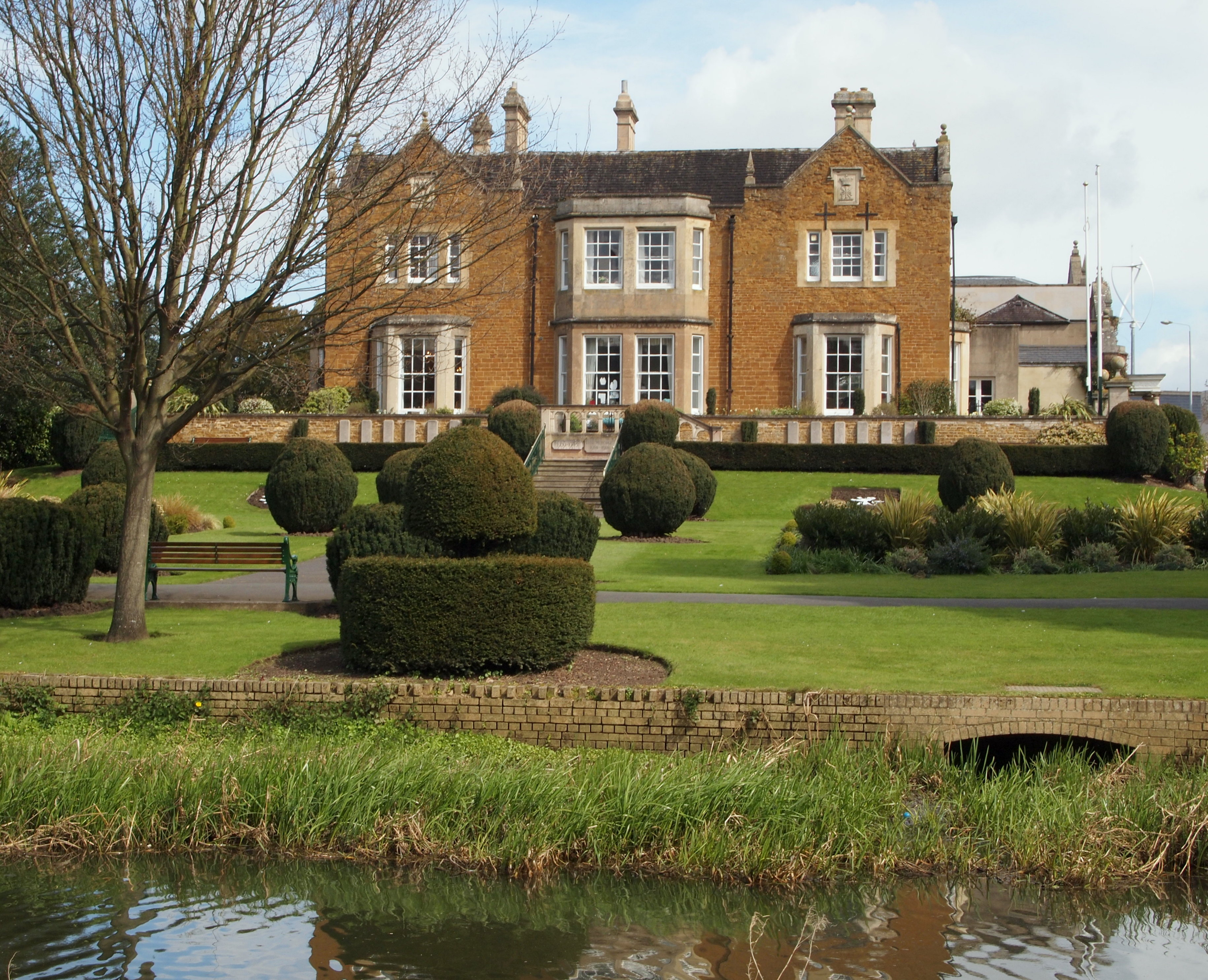
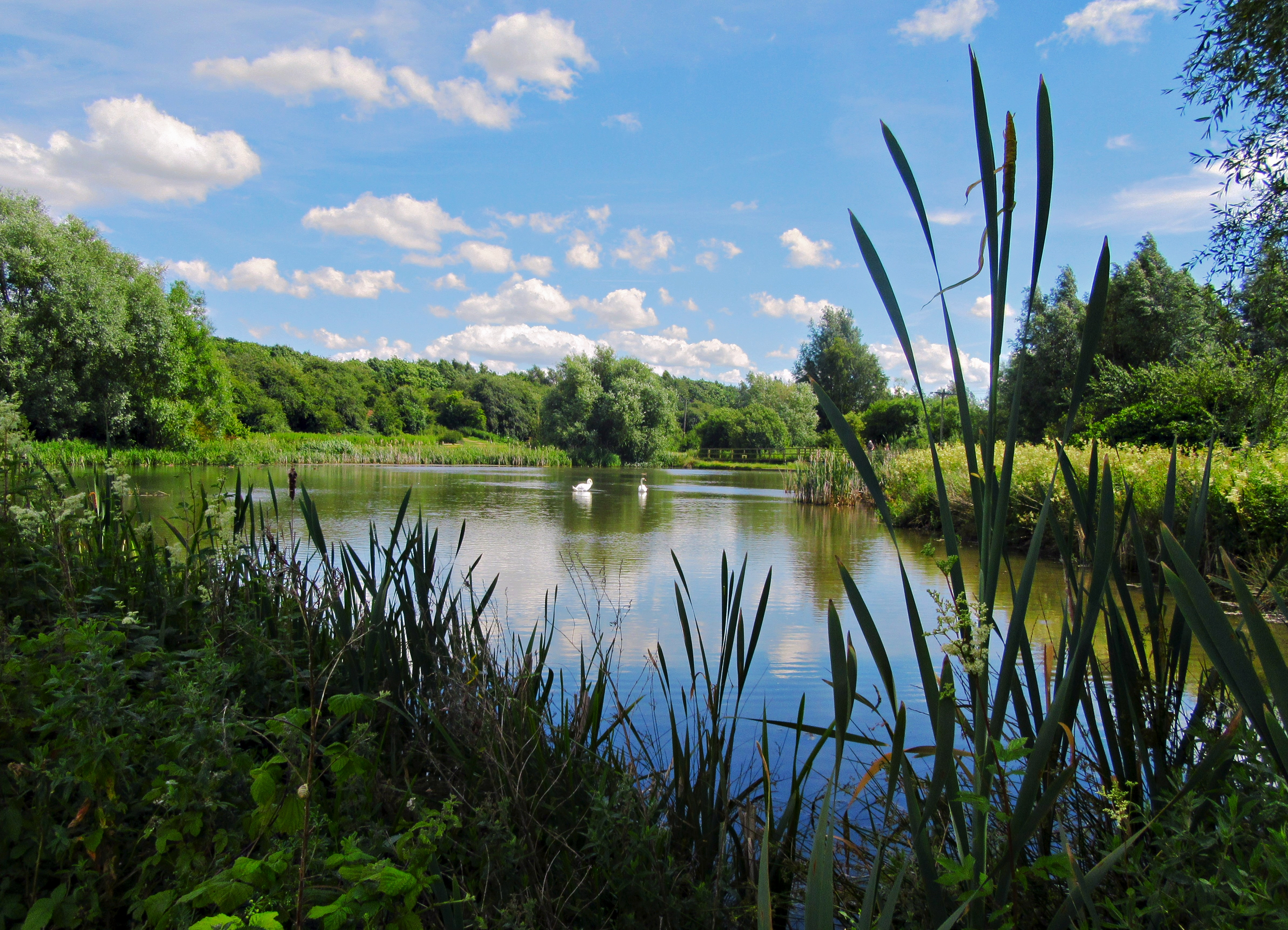
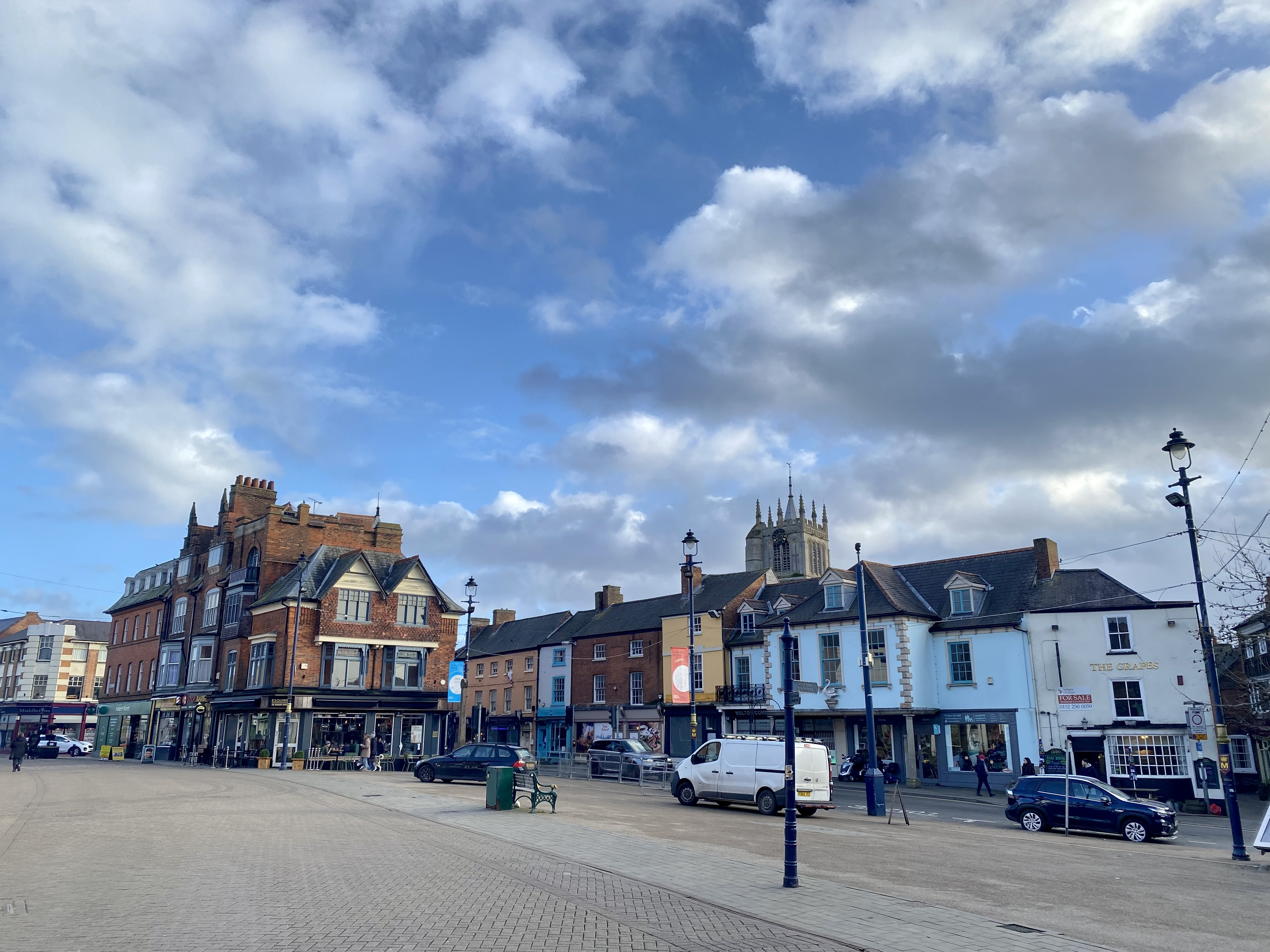
- St Mary's Church Ye Olde Pork Pie Egerton Lodge Country Park Market Place

- Location within Leicestershire
- Population: 27,737 (2021 census)
- OS grid reference: SK751193
  - London: 95 miles (153 km) SSE
- District: Melton
- Shire county: Leicestershire
- Region: East Midlands
- Country: England
- Sovereign state: United Kingdom
- Areas of the town: List: Asfordby Hill; Burton Lazars (Village); Craven; Dorian; Egerton; Newport; Sysonby; Thorpe Arnold (Village); Warwick
- Post town: MELTON MOWBRAY
- Postcode district: LE13
- Dialling code: 01664
- Police: Leicestershire
- Fire: Leicestershire
- Ambulance: East Midlands
- UK Parliament: Melton and Syston
- Website: Melton Borough Council

Melton Mowbray (/ˈmɛltən ˈmoʊbri/) is a market town in the Melton district in Leicestershire, England, 19 miles (31 km) north-east of Leicester and 20 miles (32 km) south-east of Nottingham. It lies on the River Eye, known below Melton as the Wreake. The town had a population of 27,670 in 2019. The town is sometimes promoted as Britain's "Rural Capital of Food"; it is the home of the Melton Mowbray pork pie and is the nearest market for most licensed producers of Stilton cheese.

== History ==
=== Toponymy ===
The name comes from the early English word Medeltone, referring to a town surrounded by small hamlets (as do Milton and Middleton). Mowbray is the Norman family name of early lords of the manor, including Robert de Mowbray.

=== Early history ===
In and around Melton, there are 28 scheduled ancient monuments, some 705 buildings of special architectural or historical interest, 16 sites of special scientific interest, and several deserted village sites. Windmill sites and signs of ironstone working and smelting suggest that the site was densely populated in the Bronze and Iron Ages. Pre-Roman tracks and routes existed close to Melton, including Le Ferdgate (old English 'fyrd'=army), running from the Vale of Belvoir in the north, south to Market Harborough. Many small communities existed and strategic points at Burrough Hill and Belvoir were fortified.

=== Roman times ===
In Roman times, Melton benefited from proximity to the Fosse Way and other major Roman roads, and to military centres at Leicester and Lincoln. Intermediate camps were established, for example, at Six Hills on the Fosse Way. There have been a large number of Roman finds in Melton Mowbray.

=== Anglo-Saxon and Scandinavian periods ===
Settlement in and around Melton Mowbray in the 9th and 10th century Danelaw is evident from local place names. Along the Wreake Valley, the Danish suffix "-by" is common, e.g. in Asfordby, Dalby, Frisby, Hoby, Rearsby and Gaddesby.

A cemetery of 50–60 graves of pagan Anglo-Saxon origin has been found in Melton Mowbray. Most villages and their churches had origins before the Norman Conquest of 1066, shown by stone crosses at Asfordby and Sproxton and Anglo-Saxon cemeteries at Goadby Marwood, Sysonby and Stapleford. Melton Mowbray had six recorded crosses from several centuries: (i) Kettleby Cross near today's filling station near the junction of Dalby Road and Leicester Road, (ii) Sheep Cross at Spital End, now Nottingham Street/Park Road junction, (iii) Corn Cross at Swine Lane/Spittle End junction, remade and re-erected at the Nottingham St/High St junction in 1996 as a memorial to the Royal Army Veterinary Corps, (iv) Butter Cross or High Cross at the west end of Beast Market, again rebuilt from remains of an original Anglo-Saxon cross in 1986–1987 in the Market Place, (v) Sage Cross at the East end of the Beast Market close to Saltgate, in Sherrard Street opposite Sage Cross Street, and (vi) Thorpe Cross at the end of Saltgate, near the junction of Thorpe Road and Saxby Road. The original crosses were removed or destroyed during the Reformation and other iconoclastic periods, or to make room for traffic or other development.

=== Post-conquest ===
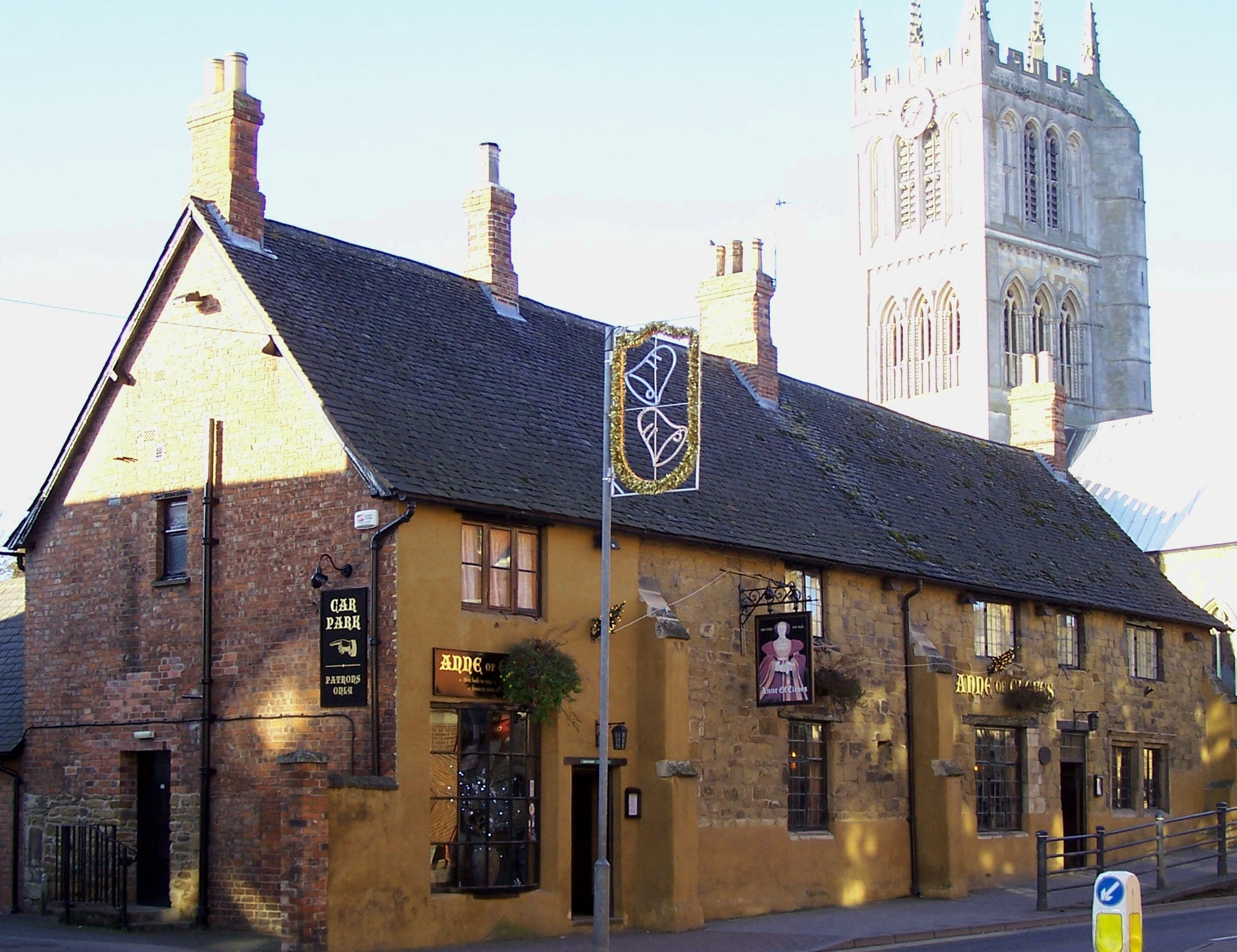
Anne of Cleves house

The effects of the Norman Conquest recorded in the 1086 Domesday Book show that settlements at Long Clawson and Bottesford were of noteworthy size, and that Melton Mowbray a thriving market town of some 200 inhabitants, with weekly markets, two water mills and two priests. The mills, still in use up to the 18th century, are remembered in the names of Beckmill Court and Mill Street.

Melton has thus been a market town for over 1,000 years. Recorded as Leicestershire's only market in the 1086 Domesday Survey, it is the third oldest market in England. Tuesday has been market day since royal approval was given in 1324. The market was founded with tolls before 1077.

Legacies from the Middle Ages include "spheres of influence" patterns of village and market-town development, seen for example, in Melton Mowbray, Bottesford, Wymondham and Waltham-on-the-Wolds. The last had a mediaeval market which survived until 1921, and an annual fair of horses and cattle. Many buildings in Melton Market Place, Nottingham Street, Church Lane, King Street and Sherrard Street have ancient foundations. Alterations to No. 16 Church Street revealed a mediaeval circular stone wall subjected to considerable heat. This is probably the Manor Oven mentioned in 13th-century documents. Surveys of 5 King Street show it belonged to an early medieval open-halled house. It may have been part of the 14th-century castle or fortified manor of the Mowbrays.

King Richard I and King John visited the town and may have stayed at an earlier castle. In 1549, after the dissolution of chantries, monasteries and religious guilds, church plate was sold and land bought for the town. Resulting rents were used to maintain Melton School, first recorded in 1347, making it one of the oldest in Britain. Funds were also used to maintain roads and bridges and repair the church clock.

=== Civil War ===
During the English Civil War, Melton was a Roundhead garrison commanded by a Colonel Rossiter. Two battles were fought: in November 1643, Royalists caught the garrison unaware and carried away prisoners and booty. In February 1645, Sir Marmaduke Langdale, commanding a Royalist force of 1,500 men, inflicted severe losses on the Roundheads. Some 300 men were said to have been killed. Legend has it that the hillside where the battle was fought was ankle deep in blood, hence the name Ankle Hill. However, the name appears in documents from before the Civil War and the names of Dalby Road and Ankle Hill have been switched, so confusing the true site of the battle.

Local notable families seem to have had divided loyalties, though the Civil War ended with rejoicings outside the Limes in Sherrard Street, home of Sir Henry Hudson. His father, Robert Hudson, founded the Maison Dieu almshouses opposite the Church in 1640, complementing the stone Anne of Cleves House opposite. This was built in 1384 and housed chantry priests until the Dissolution. It was then included in the estates of Anne of Cleves by Henry VIII, as a divorce settlement in the 16th century, although there is debate about whether she ever stayed there. A Grade II* listed building, it is now a public house owned by Everards, a Leicester brewery.

=== Modern period ===
Melton's industrial archaeology includes the Grantham Canal and remains of the Melton Mowbray Navigation.

On 6 April 1837, the 3rd Marquess of Waterford and a hunting party went on a spree through Melton streets causing much damage, according to the London Examiner. Henry Alken's pictures A Spree at Melton Mowbray and Larking at the Grantham Tollgate are said to illustrate this. They featured also in a play, The Meltonians, at The Theatre Royal, Drury Lane in 1838. The Corn Exchange in Nottingham Street was completed in 1854.

In 1942–1964, RAF Melton Mowbray lay to the south towards Great Dalby. The Class A airfield had been intended for aircraft maintenance, but was taken over by RAF Transport Command. In 1946–1958, it was used as a displaced persons camp by the Polish Resettlement Corps. Melton Mowbray served as a Thor strategic missile site in 1958–1963, when 254(SM) Squadron operated a flight of three nuclear missiles from the base.

== Produce ==
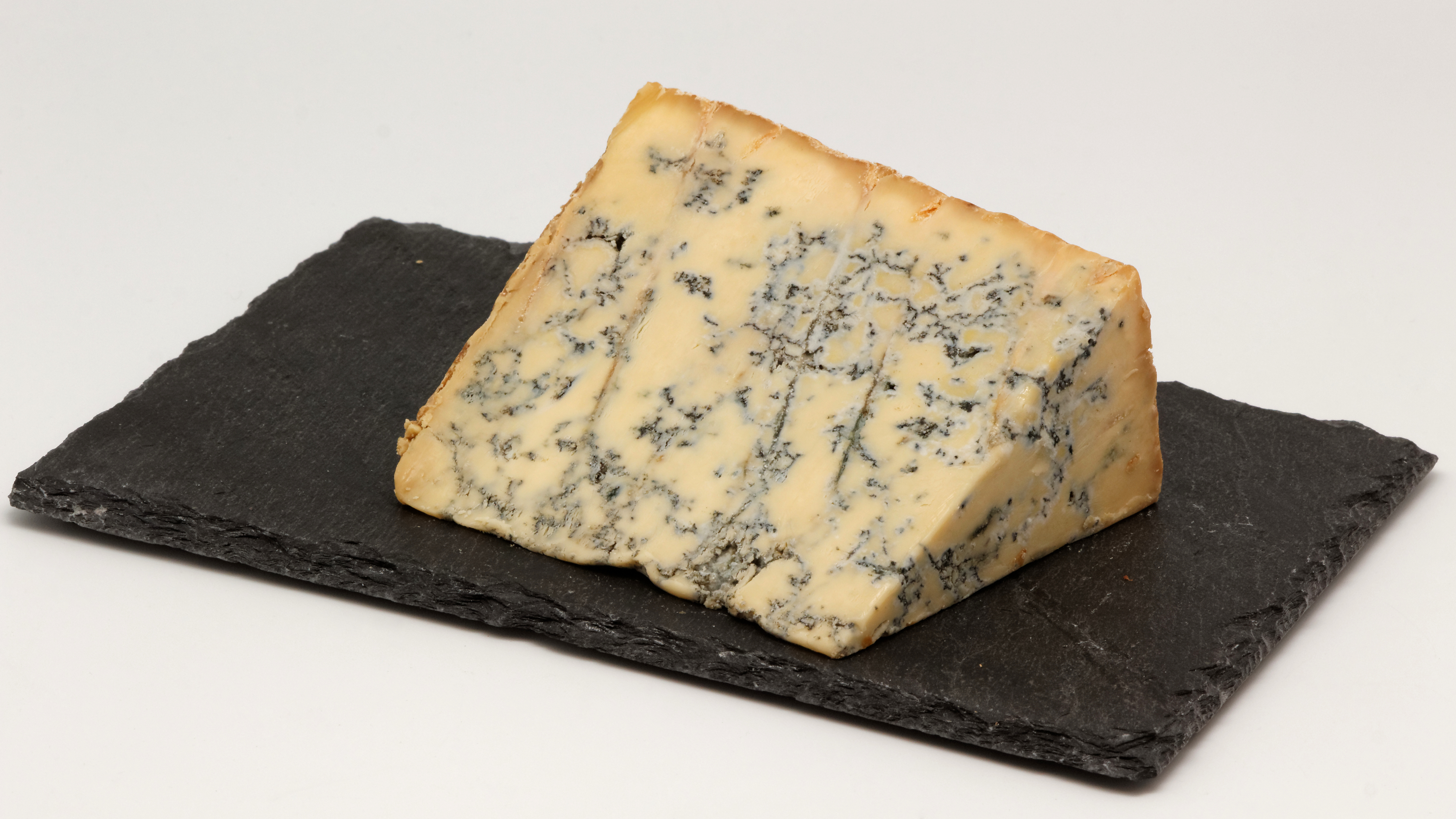
A slice of blue Stilton cheese, cut from a wheel made in the traditional cylindrical shape

Stilton cheese originated as a commercial venture developed to manufacture cheese for sale at the village of Stilton in Cambridgeshire, which has led to claims that the cheese itself originated outside that village. Historical evidence suggests an evolution of the cheese over many years, with some sourced from Melton Mowbray or surroundings. Until 2024, Stilton was made in the town at the Tuxford & Tebbutt creamery, one of only six dairies then licensed to do so. Makers in Cambridgeshire cannot call their cheese Stilton, even if it is made there. The earliest reference cited is Daniel Defoe, who in 1724 called the cheese he ate at Stilton "the English Parmesan". Growth of business from travellers on the Great North Road and from sales to London led to a need to source more cheese from further afield, including the Melton region, and over time the modern blue cheese developed.

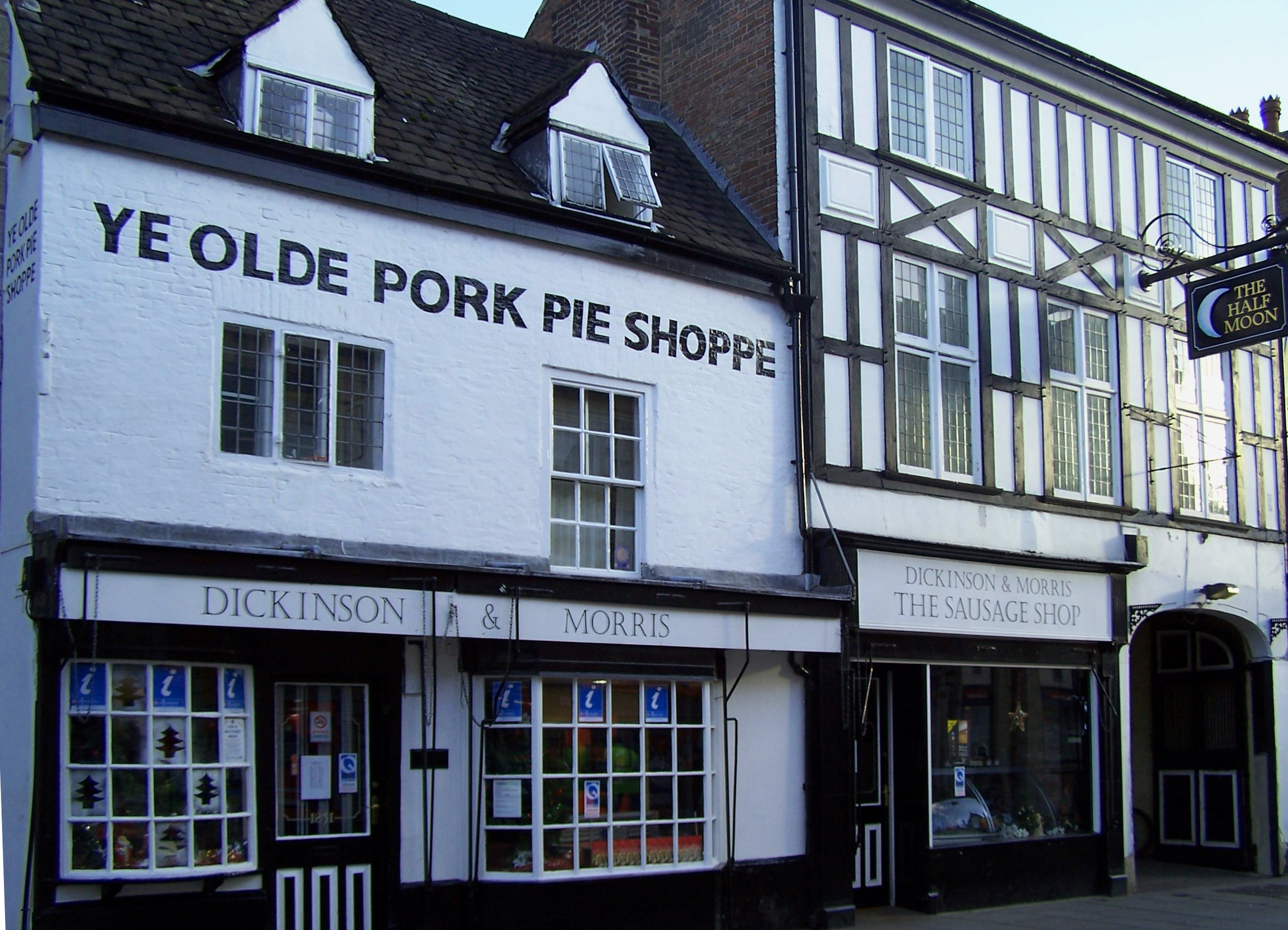
Dickinson and Morris Pie Shop

Melton Mowbray pork pies are made by a specific "hand-raising" process and recipe. On 4 April 2008 the European Union awarded the Melton Mowbray pork pie Protected Geographical Indication status, after a long-standing application made by the Melton Mowbray Pork Pie Association. Only pies made in a designated zone round Melton using uncured pork may bear the Melton Mowbray name. The pork was originally a by-product of cheese making as the whey was fed to pigs.

Melton Mowbray is home to Melton cloth, a tightly woven fabric first mentioned in 1823, heavily milled with a nap raised to a short, dense non-lustrous pile. Sailors’ pea coats are traditionally made of it, as are the commonly worn workmen's donkey jackets of Britain and Ireland, and loggers' "cruising jackets" and Mackinaws in North America.

== Governance ==
There are two tiers of local government covering Melton Mowbray, at district and county level: Melton Borough Council and Leicestershire County Council. The borough council has its offices at Parkside on Burton Street, adjoining Melton Mowbray railway station. The building was purpose-built for the council and opened in 2011.

Six of the 16 wards from which borough councillors are elected are named for the town: Melton Craven, Melton Dorian, Melton Egerton, Melton Newport, Melton Sysonby, and Melton Warwick.

=== Administrative history ===
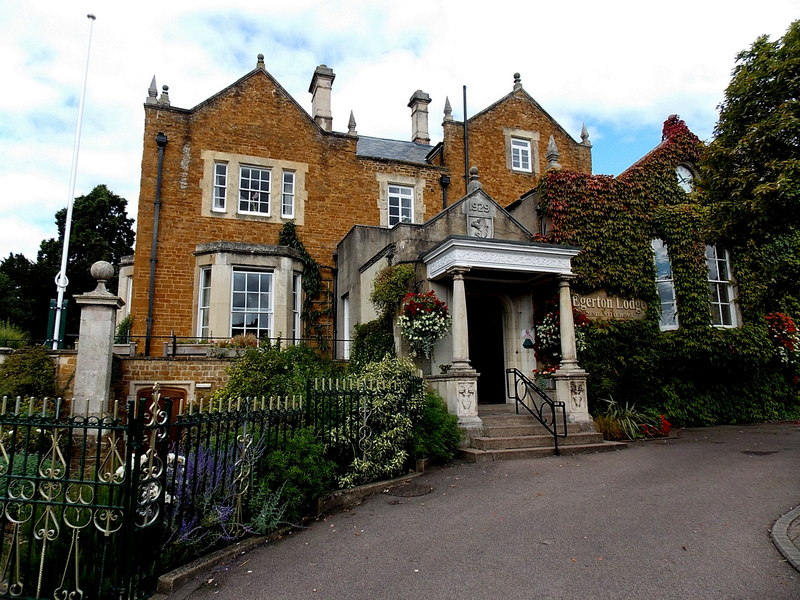
Egerton Lodge: headquarters of Melton Mowbray Urban District Council 1929–1974 and Melton Borough Council 1974–1986. In 1987, the facility was converted into a nursing home. It remained in operation until June 2023, when it went into administration.

Melton Mowbray was an ancient parish. The parish was made a local government district in 1860, governed by a local board. Such districts were reconstituted as urban districts in 1894. In 1929 the Melton Mowbray Urban District Council bought Egerton Lodge to serve as its offices and meeting place. Melton Mowbray Urban District was abolished in 1974, merging with the surrounding Melton and Belvoir Rural District to become the borough of Melton. No successor parish was created for the former urban district.

When created in 1974 Melton BC inherited offices at Egerton Lodge from Melton Mowbray Urban District Council and at Warwick Lodge on Dalby Road from Melton and Belvoir Rural District Council. In 1986 the council moved to a new building on Nottingham Road. The Nottingham Road building largely burnt down on 30 May 2008. The northern wing of the building was repaired and is now called Phoenix House, but the rest of the building was beyond repair and was demolished. The council chose to build new headquarters at Parkside, spending £5.6m on the new building.

=== Town Estate ===
Melton Mowbray contains a rare example of early town government. The Melton Mowbray Town Estate was founded in 1549, during the Reformation, when two townsfolk sold silver and plate sequestered from the church and bought land to be held in trust for all inhabitants. It provided early forms of education and the first street lighting, and still owns and keeps the town's parks, sports grounds and market. From its inception, the running of the Town Estate was undertaken by Town Wardens.

In 1989, a new Scheme of Arrangement drawn up by the Charity Commission after public consultation transferred management to a body of 14 Feoffees, two of whom are known as Senior and Junior Town Warden. Nowadays the Town Warden position is titular, as the public face of the Town Estate on civic or ceremonial occasions.

=== Constituency ===
Melton Mowbray was a part of the Rutland and Melton seat until the dissolution of Parliament for the 2024 general election, at which Melton Borough became the largest component of the new Melton and Syston constituency.

=== Demography ===
Melton Mowbray's 1,766 inhabitants in 1801 rose by 1831 to 3,327, by 1841 to 3,740, by 1851 to 4,434, and by 1861 to 4,436. Melton Mowbray's official web site listed the 2009 population of the town as 25,276 and that of Melton Borough as 46,861.

== Economy ==
Before 1960, the Production Engineering Research Association of Great Britain came to Nottingham Road and employed about 400 people in supporting research and development in industry. It is also houses the East Midlands Manufacturing Advisory Service. The former East Midlands Regional Assembly was also based in Nottingham Road.

Petfoods arrived in 1951 as Chappie Ltd, employing at its peak over 2,000. It still employs about 1,000. The firm changed its name to Petfoods in 1957, to Pedigree Petfoods in 1972, and to Masterfoods in January 2002. At Melton, it makes four million items of pet food a day, though this is less than earlier. Masterfoods now has its UK headquarters close to Melton at Waltham-on-the-Wolds.

== Landmarks ==
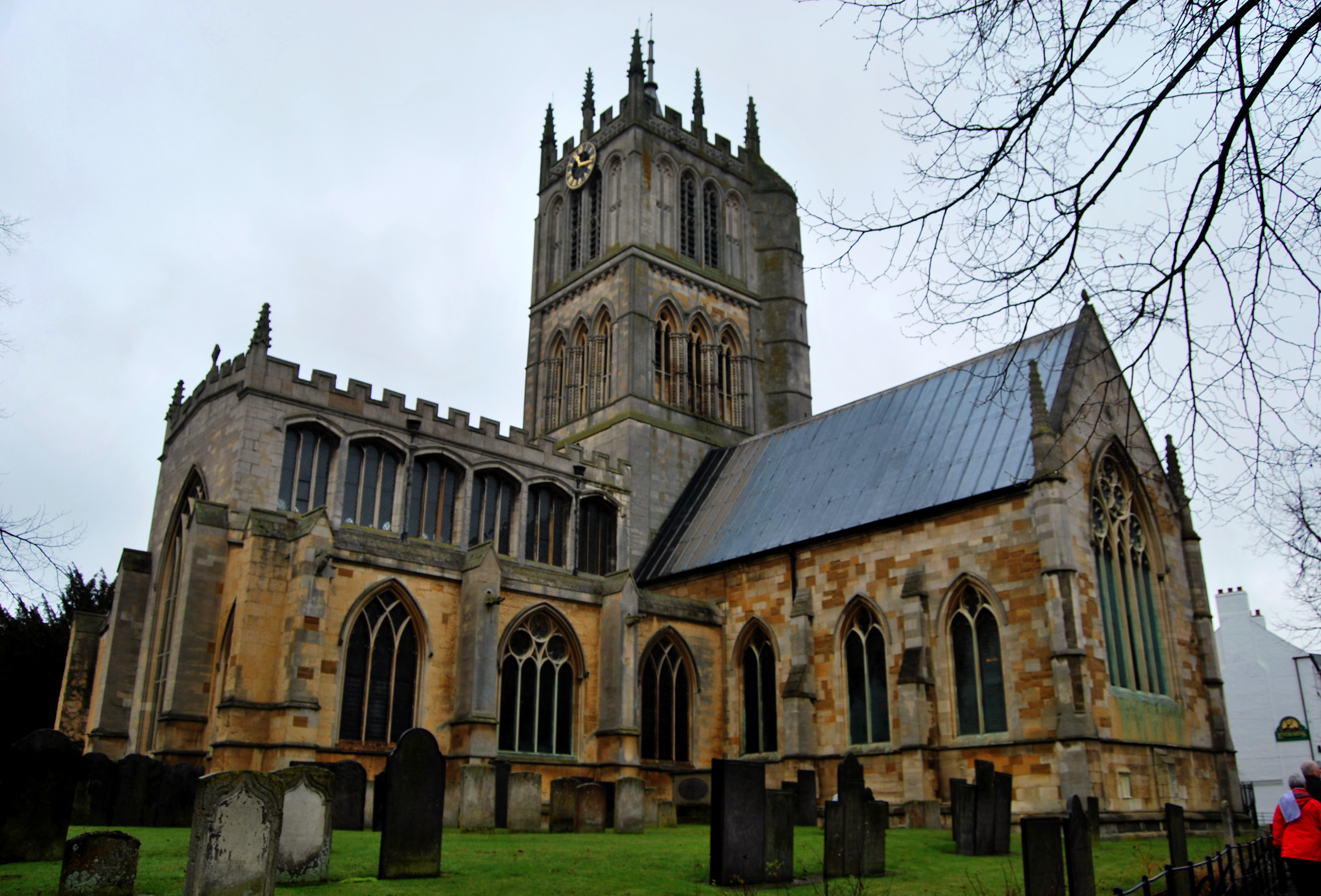
St Mary's Church, Melton Mowbray

St Mary's Church dates mainly from the 13th–15th centuries. It has been described as "one of the finest parish churches in Leicestershire".

Egerton Lodge is a Grade II listed building built in 1829 for Lord Wilton, as a hunting box. It served as the offices of Melton Mowbray Urban District Council from 1929 until its abolition in 1974, and was later a care home until 2023. Its gardens are laid out as a war memorial.

== Entertainment and facilities ==
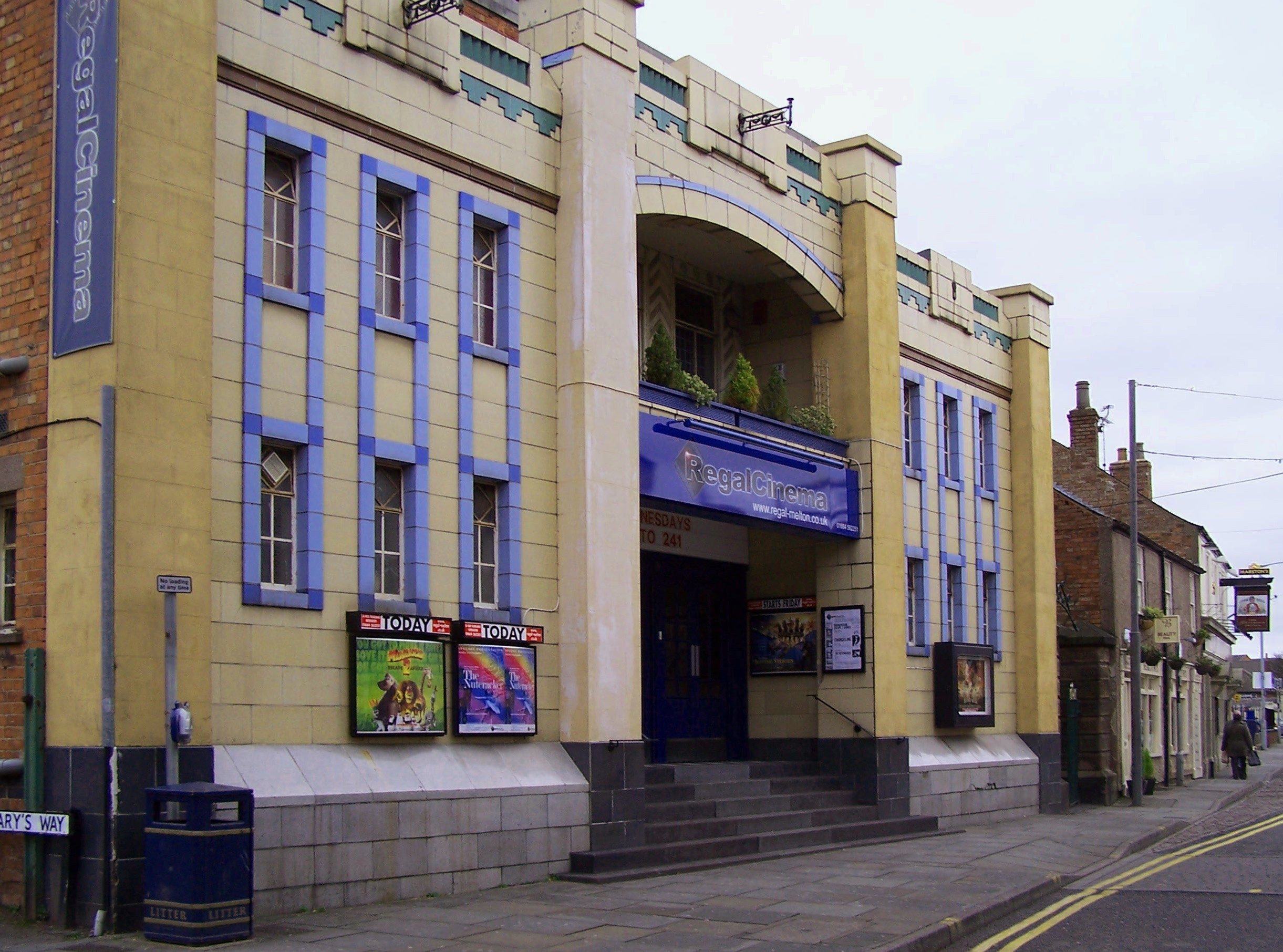
Melton Regal Cinema

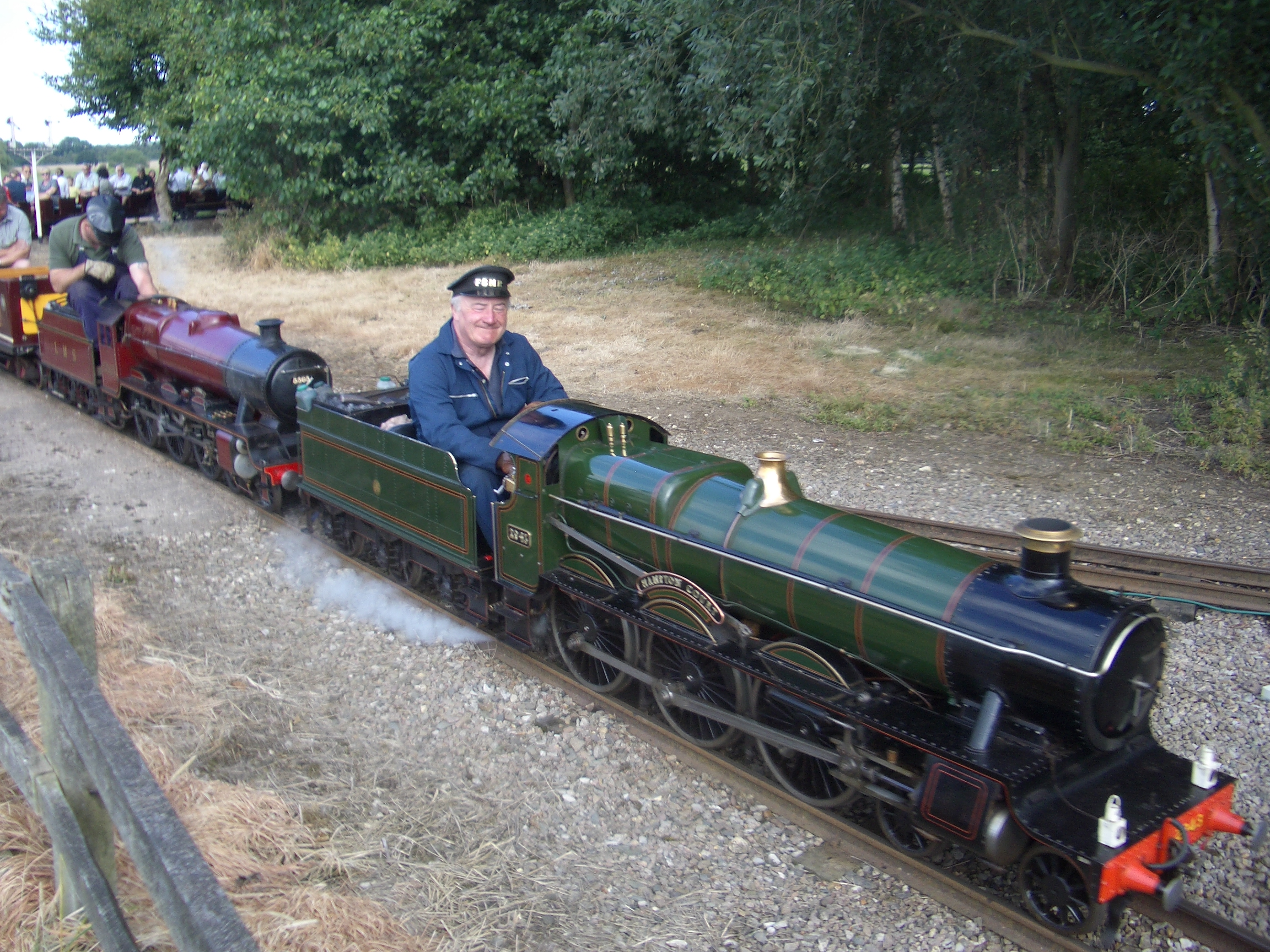
Stapleford Miniature Railway

The Melton Carnegie Library was founded in 1905 by Andrew Carnegie. In 1977 this became the Melton Carnegie Museum. This was refurbished in 2010 to cover the history of the town. Included are sounds from the ages, a history of the hunt, a preserved phone box, a buried Anglo-Saxon, and shrapnel from the Second World War.

The Melton Band, a traditional British-style brass band, can trace its directors back to 1856, and was until recently called Melton Borough Band. The colourful Melton Mowbray Toy Soldiers Marching Band was formed in 1936. Happy Jazz – a Dixieland jazz band – had its headquarters in the town in 1996–2014. The Melton Mowbray Tally Ho Band formed in 1936 and the mixed brass and woodwind Tornado Brass in the 1980s.

Some of Melton's many pubs, such as the Generous Britain or Jenny B, continue to encourage live music. The Noels Arms free house was Melton Mowbray District CAMRA Pub of the Year in 2014 and was also briefly home to Gasdog Brewery. One of Melton's oldest surviving pubs, with features from the early 14th century, is the Anne of Cleves in Burton Street, close to St Mary's Church; once home to chantry monks, the building was passed after the Dissolution to Anne of Cleves as part of her divorce settlement.

The town cinema, The Regal in King Street, occupies a purpose-built theatre complete with period interior design, sumptuous colours, winding staircases and fancy plasterwork. It re-opened in 2013 after refurbishment.

Concerts have been held at the Carousel Bandstand in Melton Mowbray Park since August 1909. They take place on summer Sundays.

Melton's radio station, 103 FM The Eye, broadcasts to Melton Borough and the Vale of Belvoir and parts of Rushcliffe Borough. It can also be heard on the internet. When launched in 2005, it was the first in the UK to go on the air under the new tier of community radio, licensed by the broadcasting regulator OFCOM. The station has since won awards for its work. It is named after the local river, the Eye.

The Stapleford Miniature Railway, built in 1958, is a private, steam-hauled passenger railway at Stapleford Park about 3 miles (5 km) to the east of Melton Mowbray. Famous for a fleet of steam locos and its scenic location, it attracts visitors and tourists for two public charity events each year. It has the same 10 1/4 in (260 mm) gauge as the Town Estates railway around Play Close Park in Melton.

Also 1/2 mile (800 m) to the north-east of Melton is the Twinlakes Theme Park, with a range of family attractions and rides. The Waterfield Leisure Pools include a gym and fitness suite, as well as swimming.

The library in Wilton Road is close to the town centre. Adjacent is Melton Theatre, part of Brooksby Melton College, on the junction with Asfordby Road. The theatre, first opened in 1976, was recently refurbished. In the past few years, it has produced ballet, opera and stage plays and provided a venue for bands and acts, pantomime and art shows.

Melton has a fire station, a police station, and a hospital that includes St Mary's Maternity Centre. The War Memorial Hospital off Ankle Hill, originally Wyndham Lodge, was donated to the town in 1920 by Colonel Richard Dalgliesh. It was sold in 2010 to help fund St Mary's Hospital. Melton Country Park provides green space.

== Education ==
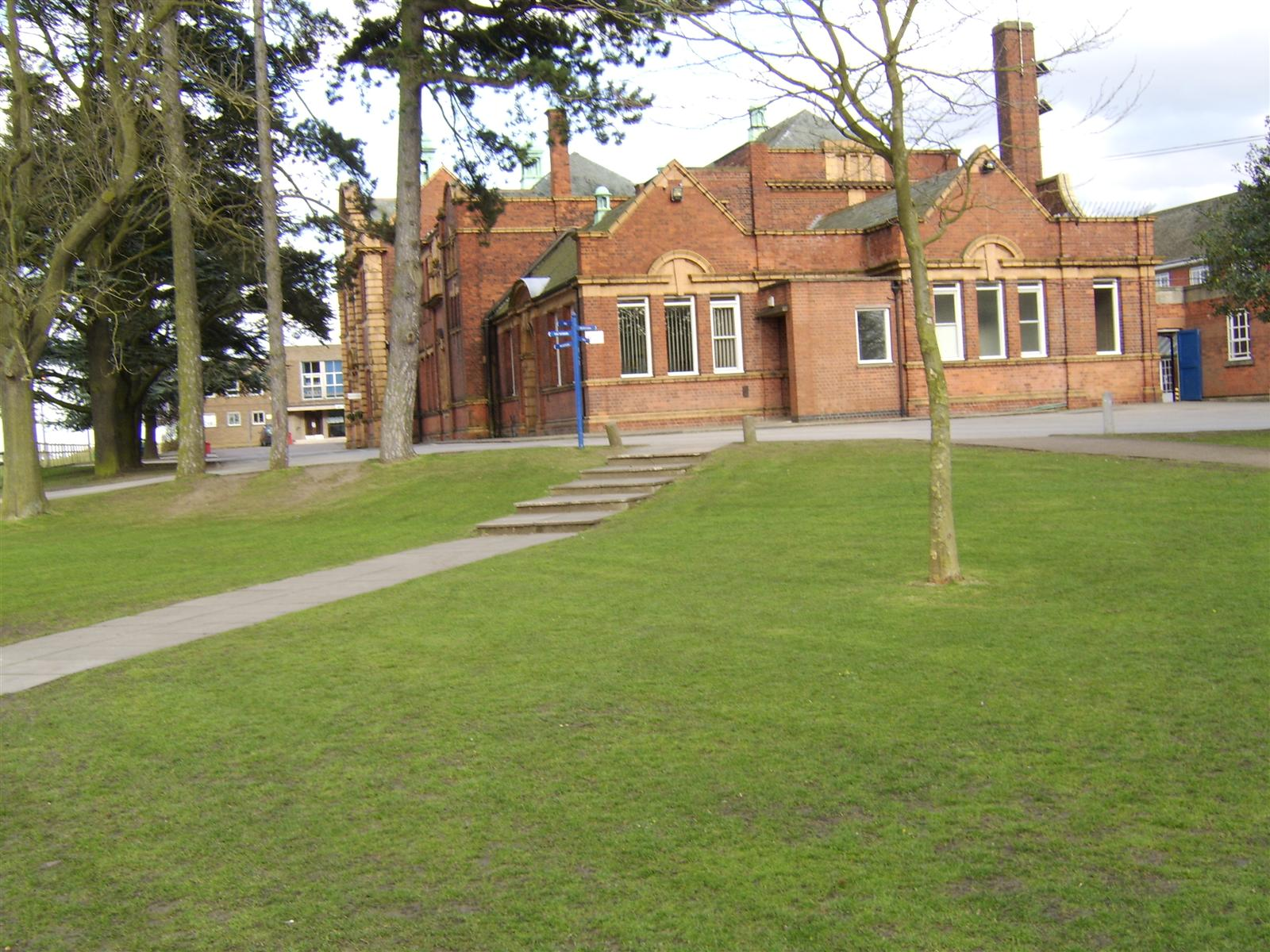
The former King Edward VII School, Melton Mowbray

The town's secondary schools are Long Field Academy and John Ferneley College for pupils aged 11–16 and the Melton Vale Post 16 Centre (MV16) for sixth-formers. Its primary schools are Brownlow, Grove, St Francis RC, St Mary's C of E, Sherard and Swallowdale. Birch Wood Special School caters for pupils of primary and secondary-school age. Melton's largest school was the King Edward VII, which at one time had some 2,000 pupils aged 11–19. It was founded as a grammar school in 1910, became comprehensive in the late 1960s, and closed after reaching its centenary. Brooksby Melton College, 6 miles (10 km) out of town, is now the sports campus of the Loughborough College group, while performing arts are based at a campus in Asfordby Road.

Several independent schools provide bus services to Melton. These include Oakham School, founded in 1584, a co-educational day and boarding school; Stamford School, established in 1532, also a co-educational day and boarding school; and the Loughborough Schools Foundation, which oversees Loughborough Grammar School, a boys’ day and boarding school, and Loughborough High School, a girls’ day school.

== Media ==
Local news and television programmes are provided by BBC East Midlands and ITV Central. Television signals are received from the nearby Waltham TV transmitter.

Local radio stations are BBC Radio Leicester on 104.9 FM, Smooth East Midlands on 106.6 FM, Capital Midlands on 96.2 FM, Greatest Hits Radio Midlands on 106.0 FM, and The Eye, a community-based radio station which broadcast from the town on 103 FM.

The Melton Times is the town's weekly newspaper.

== Transport ==
=== Road ===
Two main roads intersecting at Melton Mowbray are the A606 between Nottingham and Oakham and the A607 between Leicester and Grantham. Other roads include the A6006 from Asfordby, the second section of the B676 road to Colsterworth, and the B6047 road to Market Harborough, which starts in Melton.

A bypass relief road, the North & East Melton Mowbray Distributor Road, connecting the A606 and A607 with the aim of alleviating congestion in the town centre, began construction in spring 2023 and opened to traffic on 18 May 2026. The road cost £131m. After a public vote, it was decided that the road would be called Pork Pie Way.

=== Rail ===
Melton Mowbray railway station, on the Birmingham to Stansted Airport line, also serves Leicester, Peterborough and Cambridge. Trains run hourly. The station offers peak-hour trains to and from Nottingham, Norwich and Sleaford. It is managed by East Midlands Railway, but most services are run by CrossCountry, which intends to enhance its service gradually to half-hourly on this route. Since early 2009, East Midlands Trains has offered a single daily journey from Melton Mowbray to London St Pancras and return. This is notable for being the first regular passenger service to cross the historic Welland Viaduct since 1966. In 2010, the company introduced a single daily return journey to Derby.

=== Buses ===
Arriva Midlands provide frequent buses to Leicester on service 5A. Centrebus are the main operator of bus services around the town, with some longer-distance routes operating to Nottingham, Syston, Grantham, Loughborough, and Oakham.

== Sport ==
Greyhound racing was held at a stadium on the north side of Saxby Road in 1946–1969. Motorcycle speedway racing was held at the Greyhound Stadium in 1949–1950. The cinder track was laid before and lifted after each meeting. The events, staged on a Sunday, were opposed by the Lord's Day Observance Society for a short time. The stadium was also the venue for a few meetings in 1950 when the Melton Lions faced select teams.

Melton Town Football Club competes in the United Counties League Premier Division North, step five in the English Football Pyramid. Known as the Pork Pie Army, they play their home games at Melton Sports Village on a recently installed FIFA Pro Quality 3G pitch.

Melton Rugby club competes in Counties 2 Midlands East(North). The town has its own Sunday Football League, in which some 15 teams compete every Sunday. Asfordby Hill is home to Holwell Sports, which plays in the Leicestershire Senior League premier division.

Leicestershire County Cricket Club played first-class cricket at Egerton Park in 1946–1948.

There is a parkrun (held in the country park every Saturday morning) and a junior parkrun (held in Play Close Park every Sunday morning).

== Notable people ==
=== Arts and music ===
- Carlo Curley (1952–2012) – concert organist
- Louise Doughty (born 1963) – novelist and broadcaster
- John Ferneley (1782–1860) – artist
- Francis Grant (1803–1878) – artist
- Tom Marshall (born 1988) – artist and photo colourist
- Sir Malcolm Sargent (1895–1967) – conductor

=== Sport ===
- Paul Anderson (born 1988) – league footballer
- Len Boyd (1923–2008) – league footballer
- Stuart Broad (born 1986) – test cricketer
- John Brooks (born 1990) – Premier League assistant referee
- Paul Butlin (born 1976) – heavyweight boxer
- Craig Dalrymple (born 1976) – league footballer
- Craig Dolby (born 1988) – racing driver
- Arthur Fitton (1902–1984) – league footballer
- Reuben Jones (1932–1990) – Olympian equestrian sportsman
- Robert Turner King (1824–1884) – county cricketer
- Bob Lee (born 1953) – league footballer
- Dixie McNeil (born 1947) – league footballer and manager
- Tim Munton (born 1965) – test cricketer
- James Tebbs (1874 – post-1901) – league footballer
- Jamie Vardy (born 1987) – league footballer
- Alison Williamson (born 1971) – Olympic archer
- Eliot Zborowski (1858–1903) – car racing driver

=== Stage/screen ===
- Charlie Bruce (born 1990) – jazz dancer
- Graham Chapman (1941–1989) – comedian, Monty Python
- William Furness (1929–1995) – theatre producer and peer
- Peter Meineck (born 1967) – founder director of Aquila Theatre
- Steve Oram (born 1973) – actor, Sightseers
- Adrian Scarborough (born 1968) – actor, Gavin & Stacey and Psychoville
- Clive Standen (born 1981) – actor
- Mark Wingett (born 1961) – actor, Jim Carver in The Bill

=== Other ===
- Tom Brake (born 1962) – former member of Parliament
- Richard Henry Burton (1923–1993) – awarded a Victoria Cross in the Second World War
- John Gretton (1867–1947) – politician, businessman and Olympic sailor
- John Henley (1692–1756) – preacher
- William Levett (c. 1643–1694) – scholar and cleric
- Anthony Turner (1628–1679) – Jesuit priest and martyr
- Arthur Wakerley (1862–1932) – architect

== Gallery ==
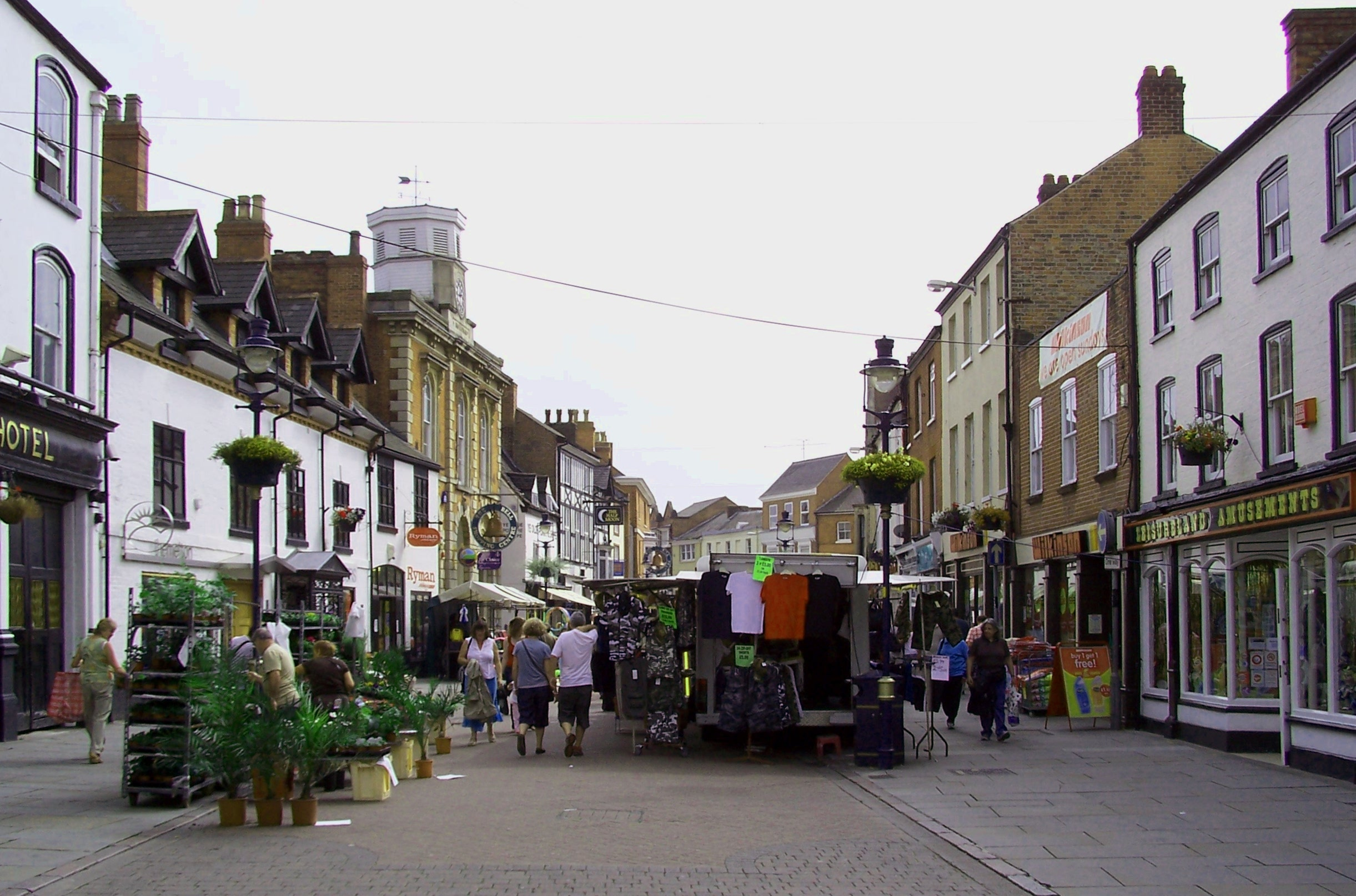
Approaching the Market from Nottingham Street

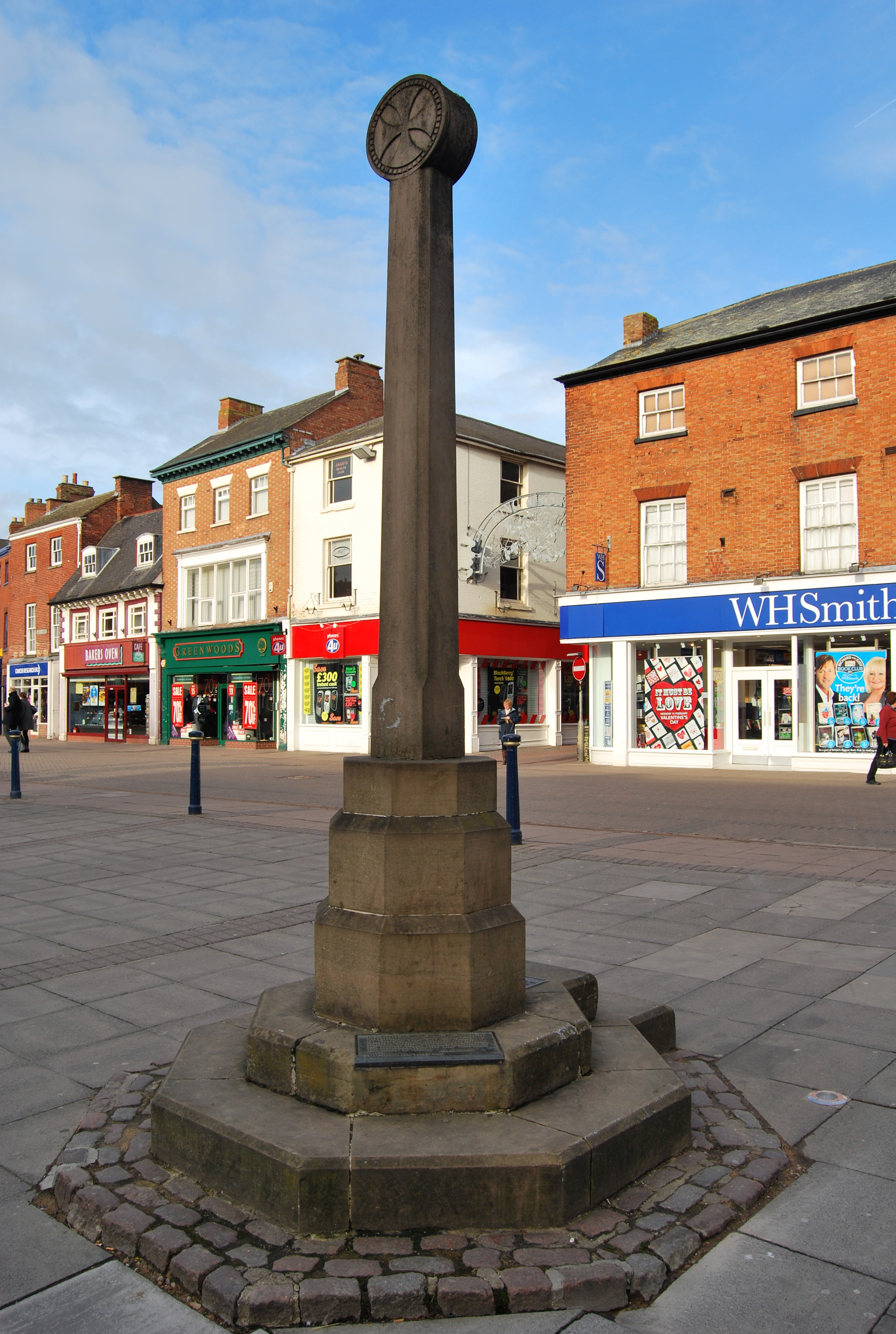
Melton Mowbray butter cross (reconstructed)

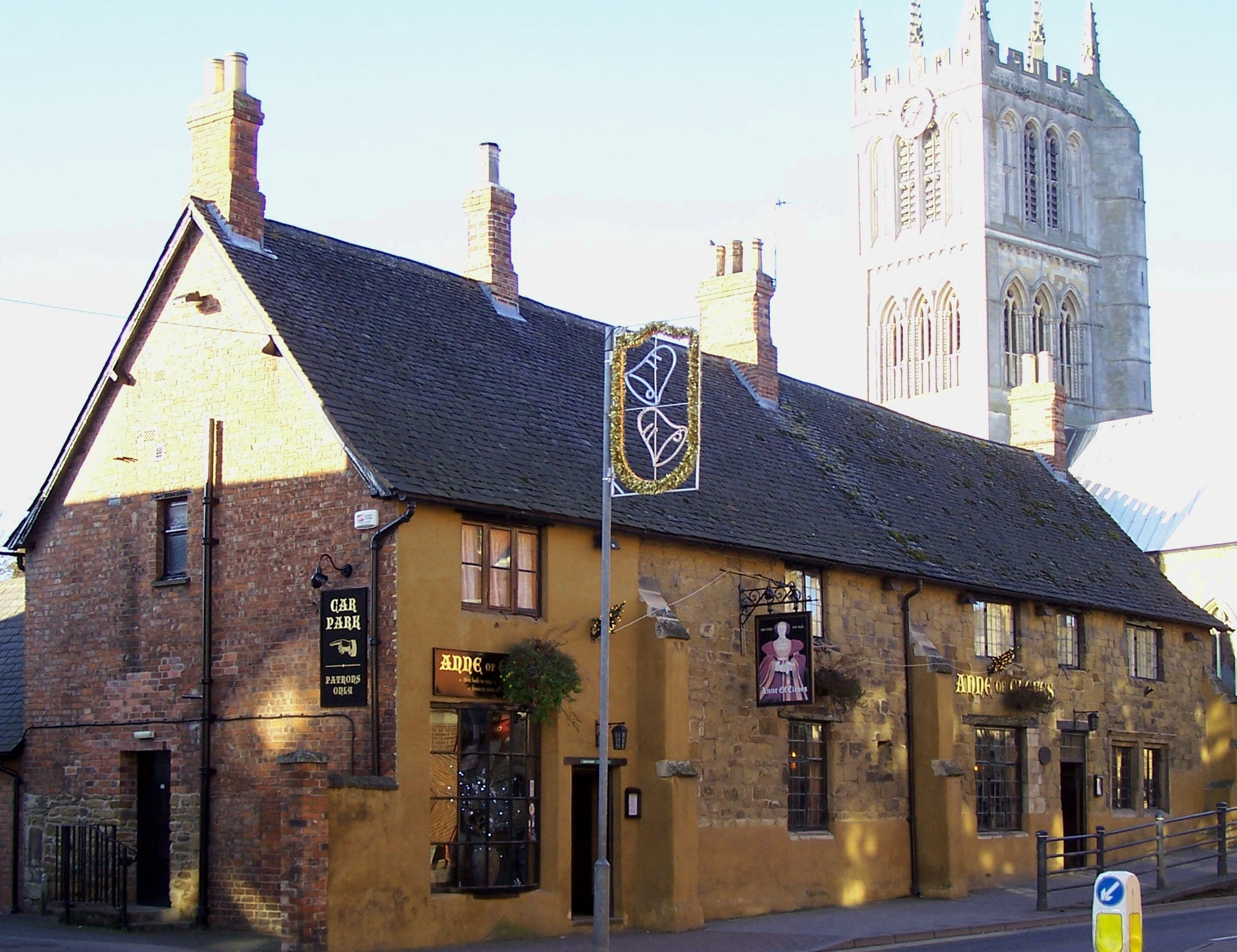
Anne of Cleves public house

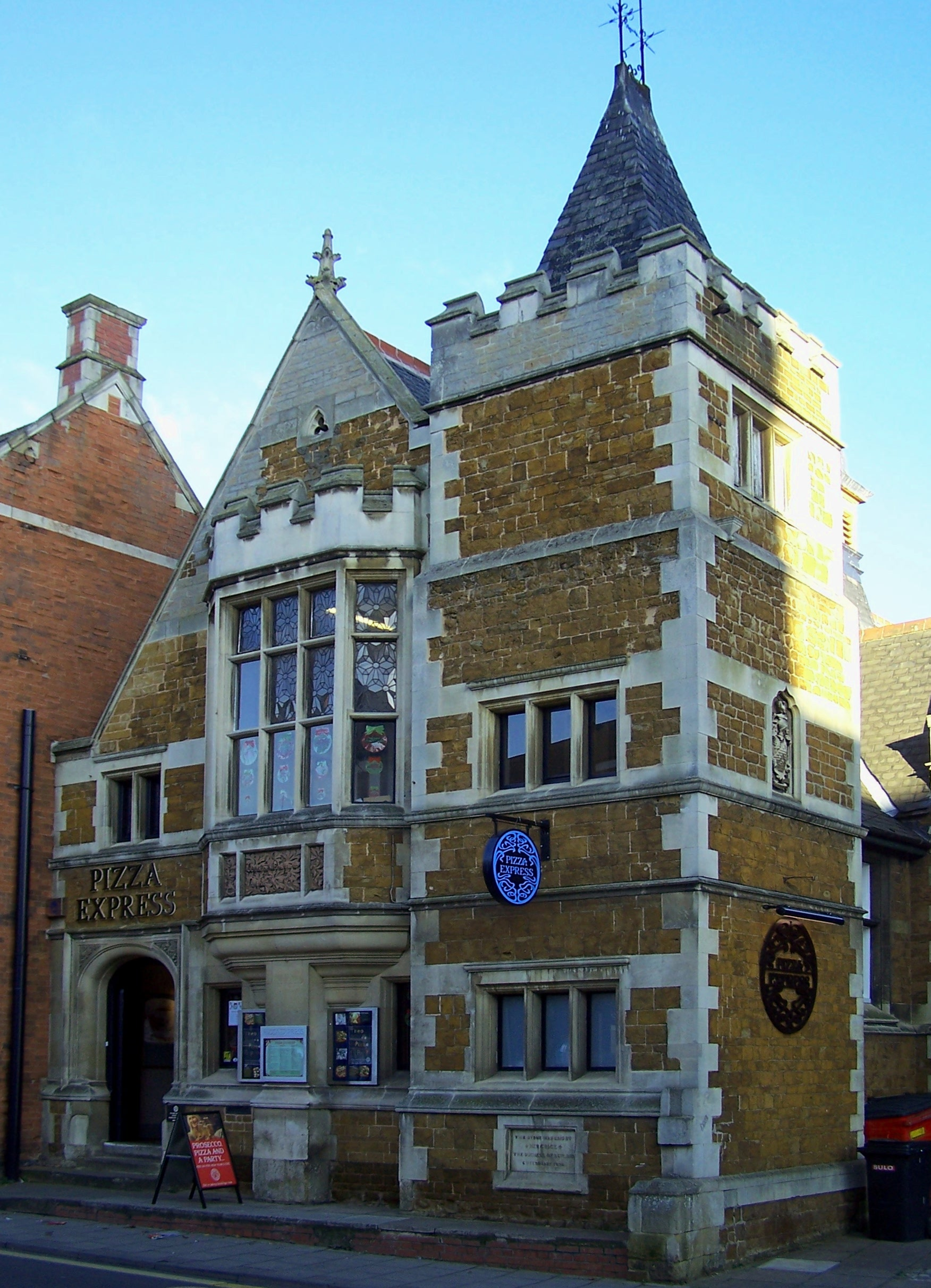
The former Coles Hall

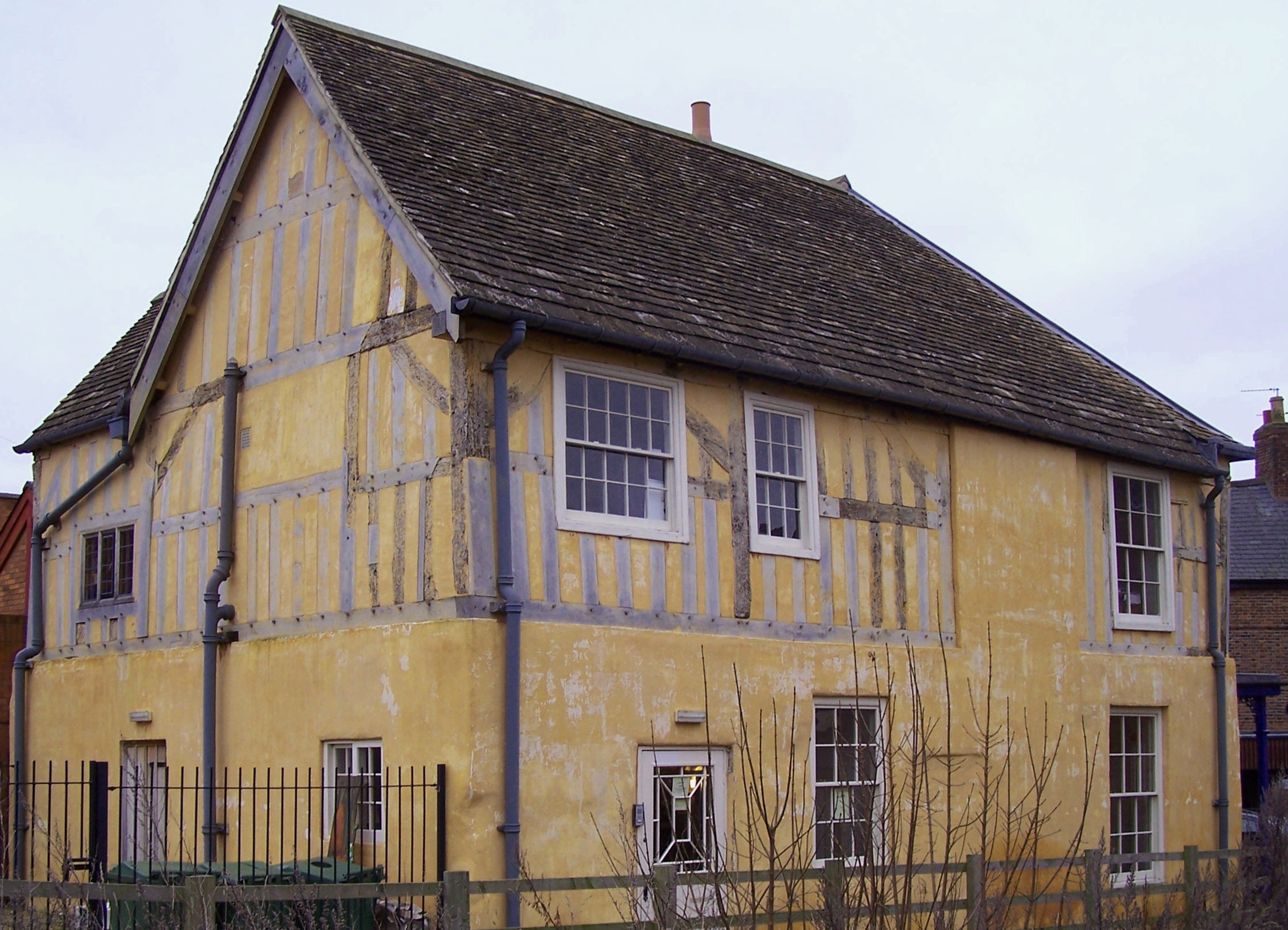
Rear of the old tourist office

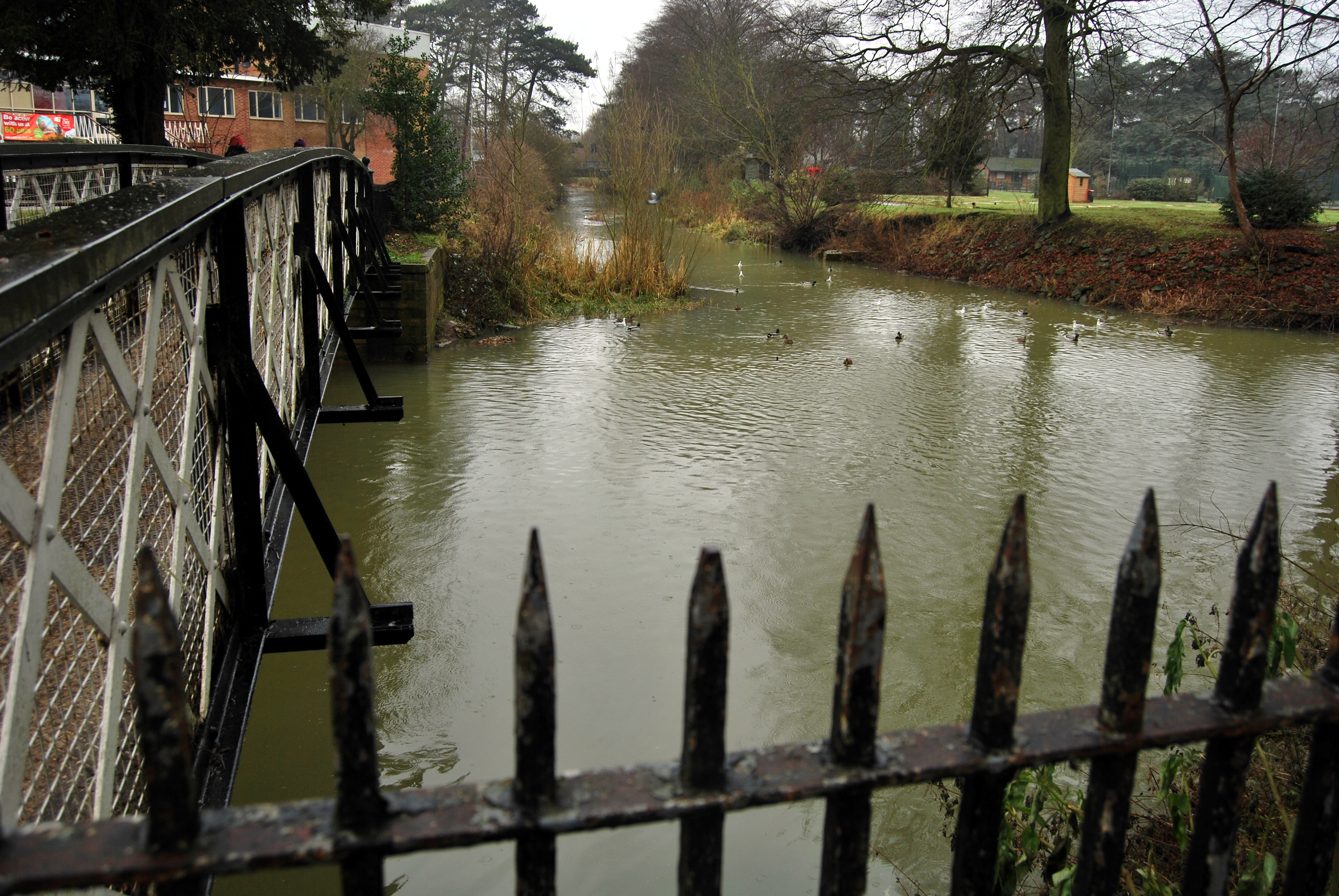
River Eye and footbridge

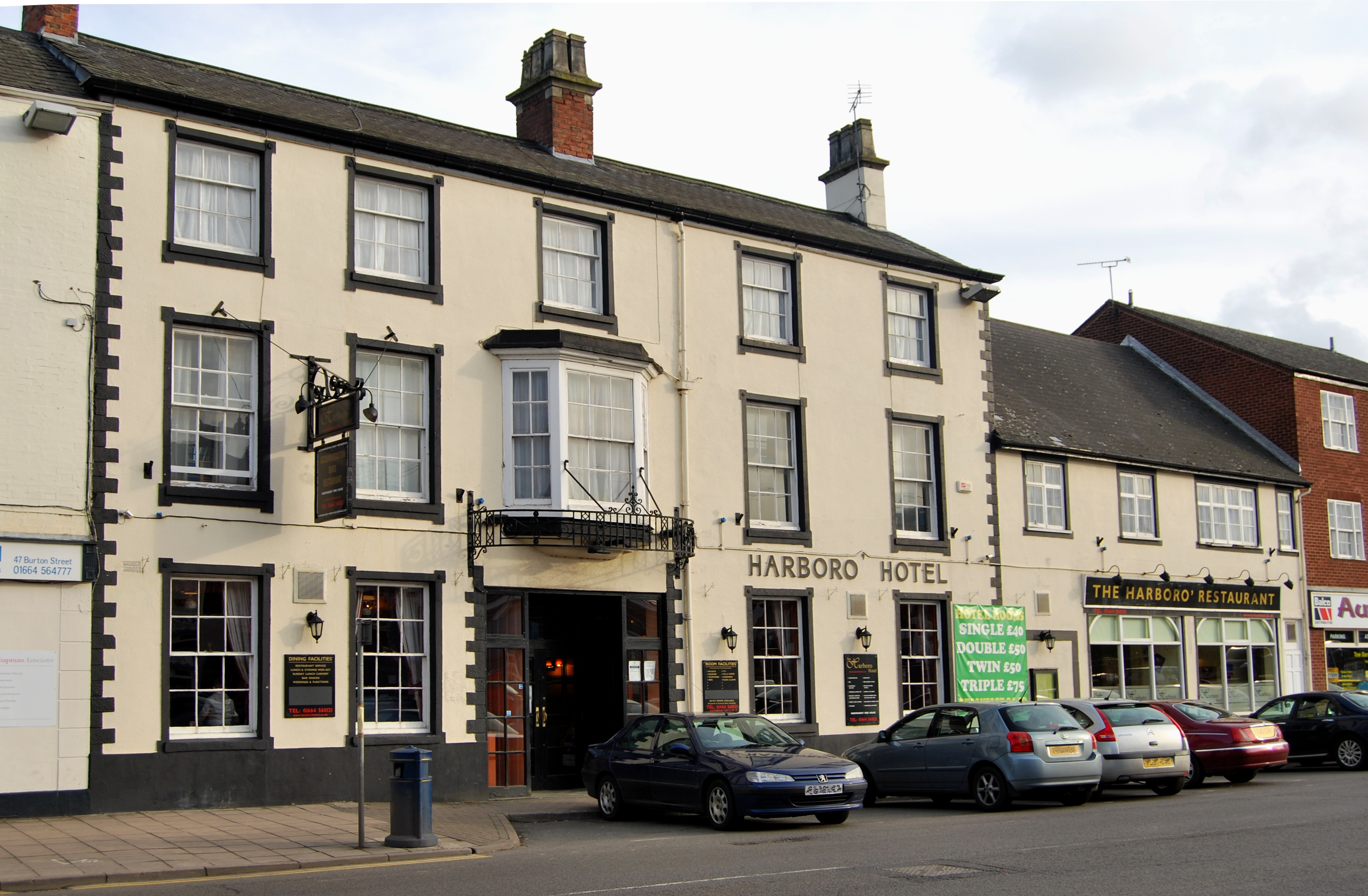
Harboro Hotel

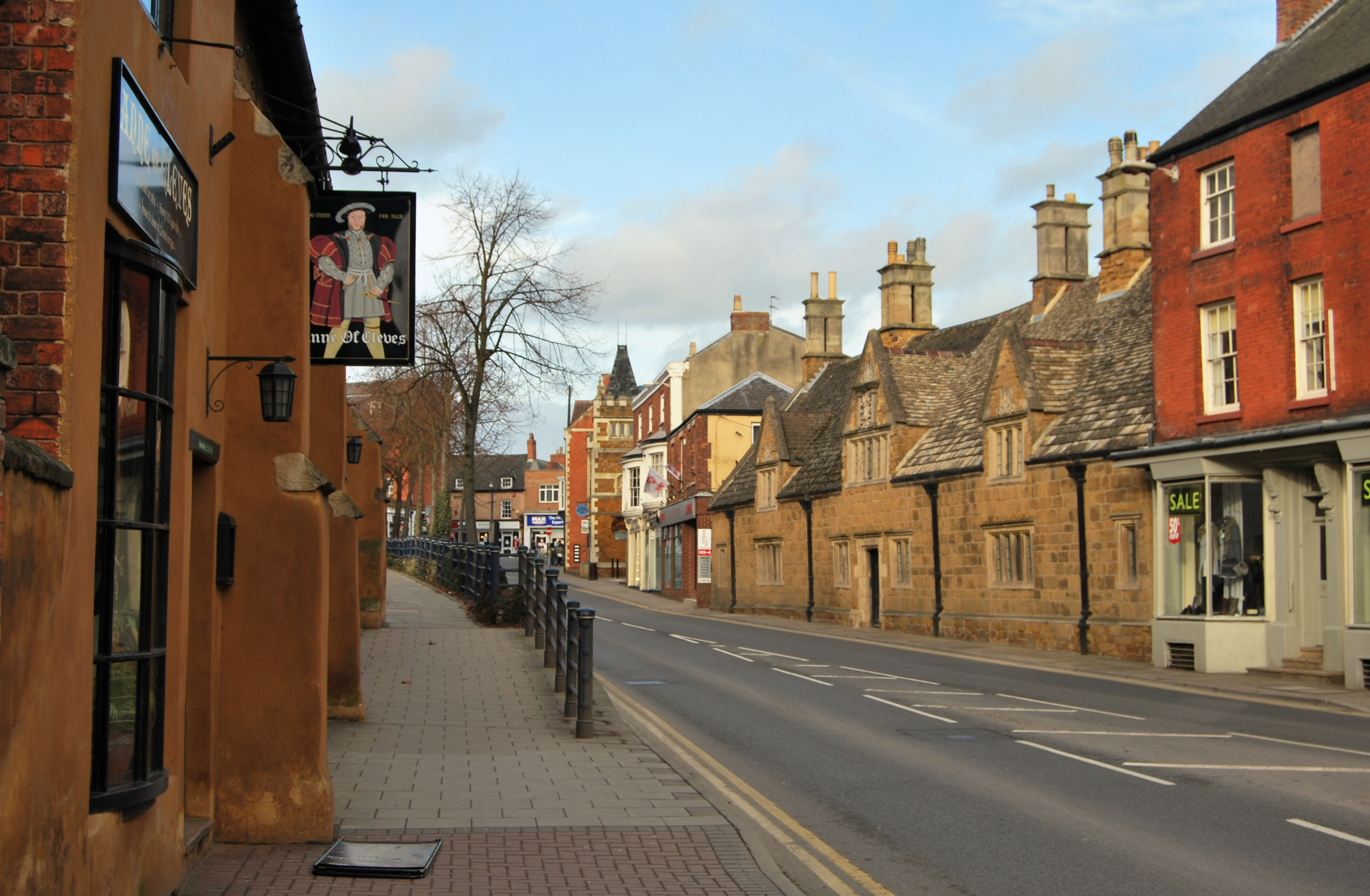
Burton Street

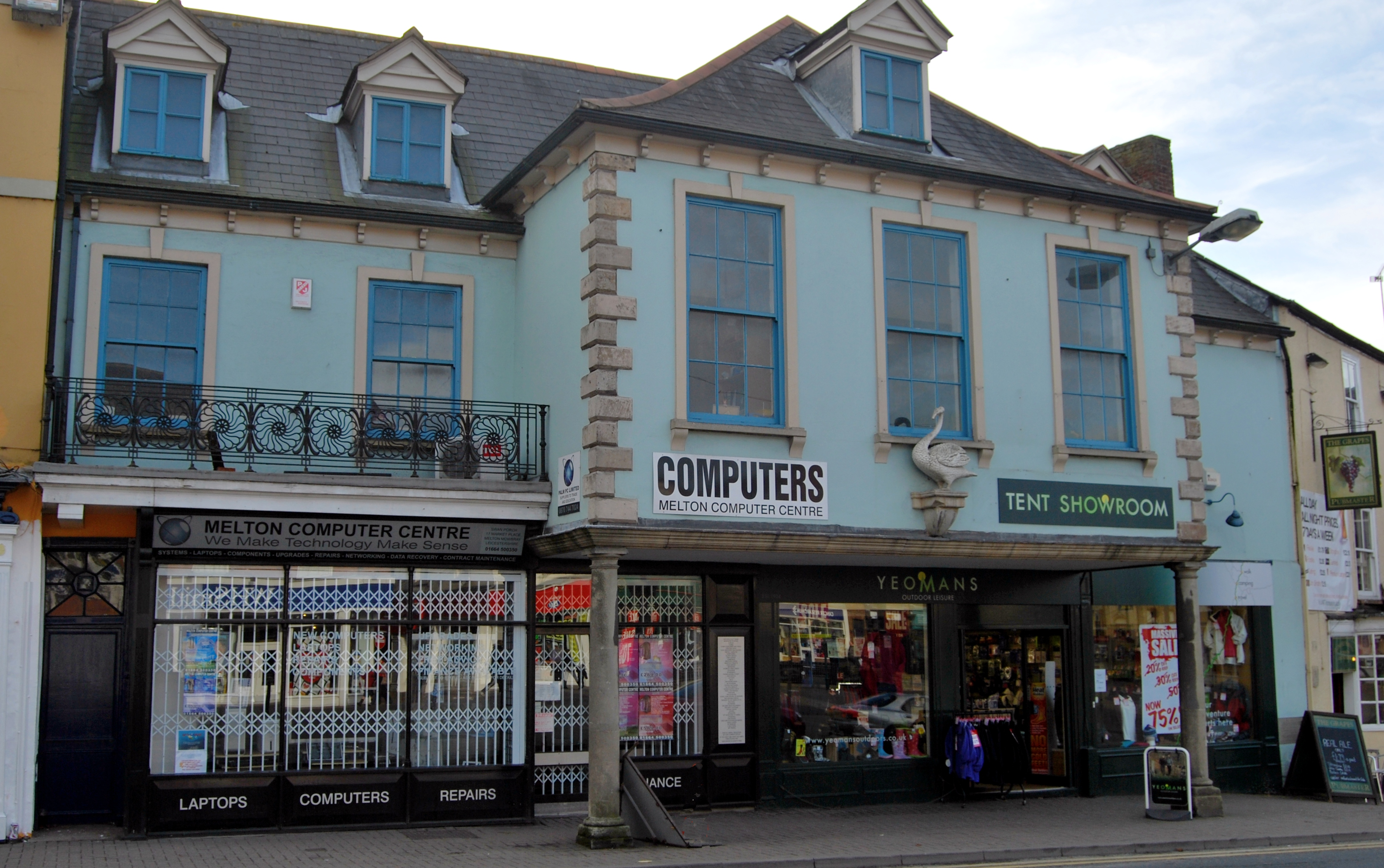
Swan porch

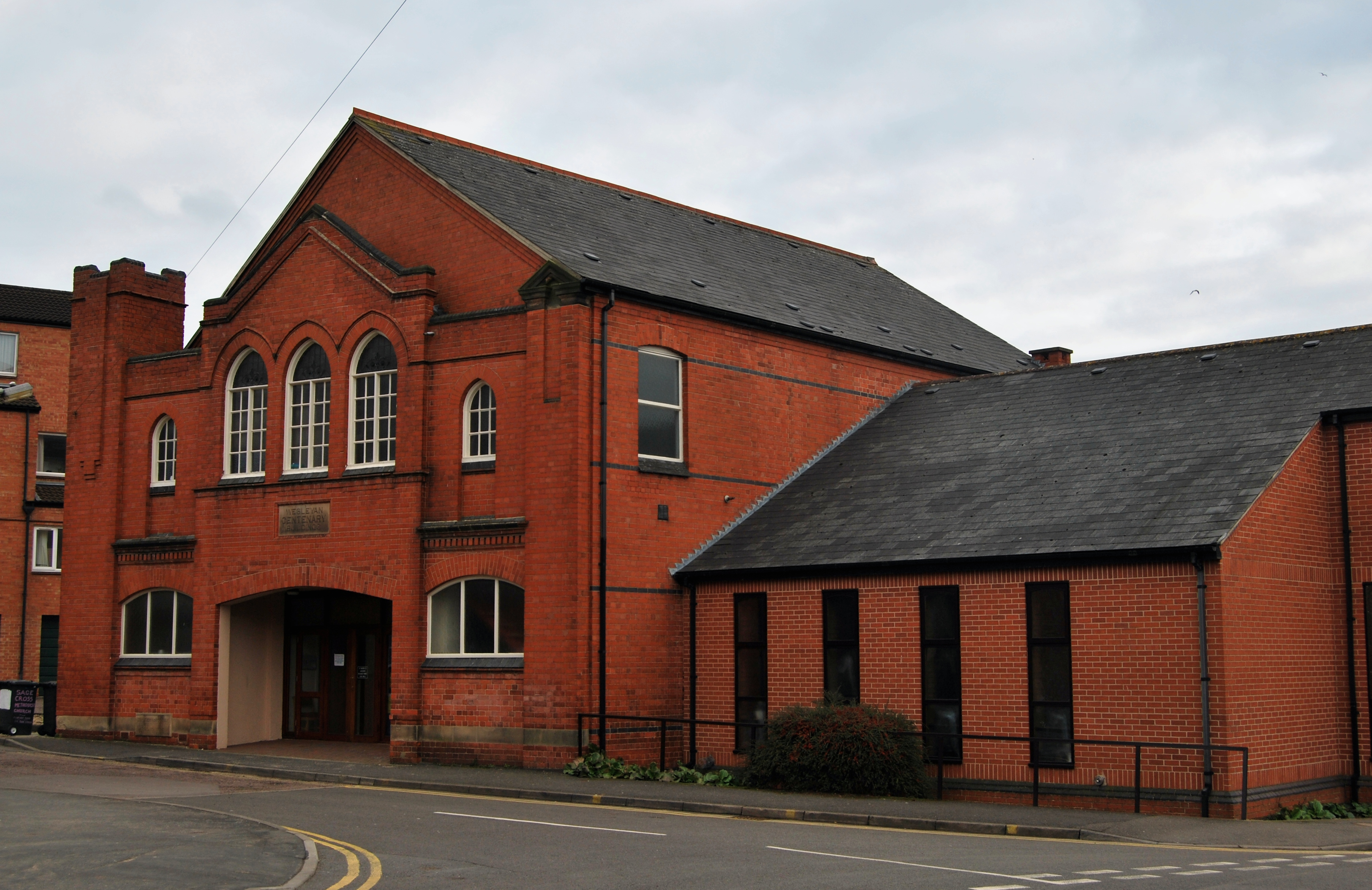
Wesleyan Centenary Buildings (Sage Cross Methodist Church and Community Centre)

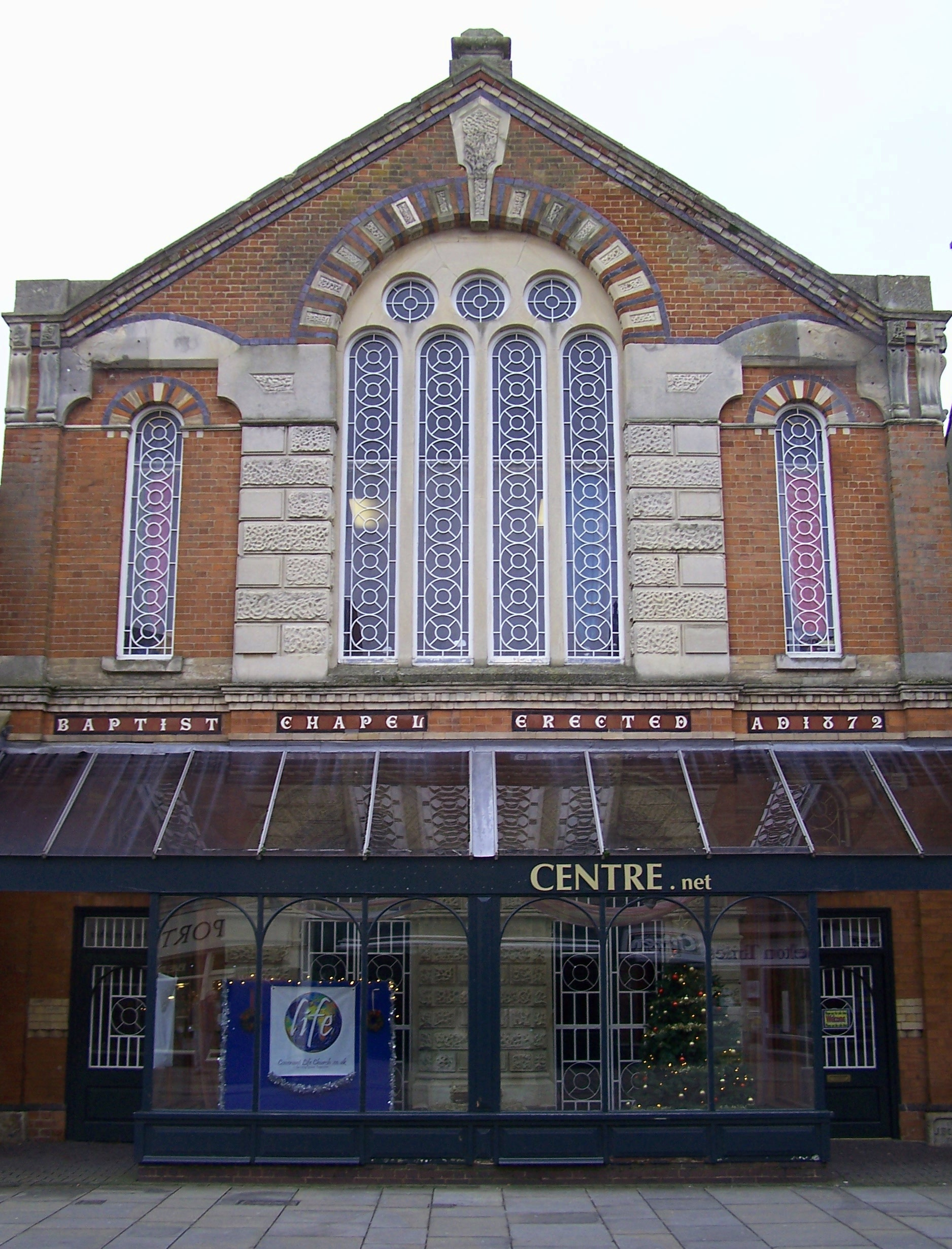
Reused Baptist chapel on Nottingham Street

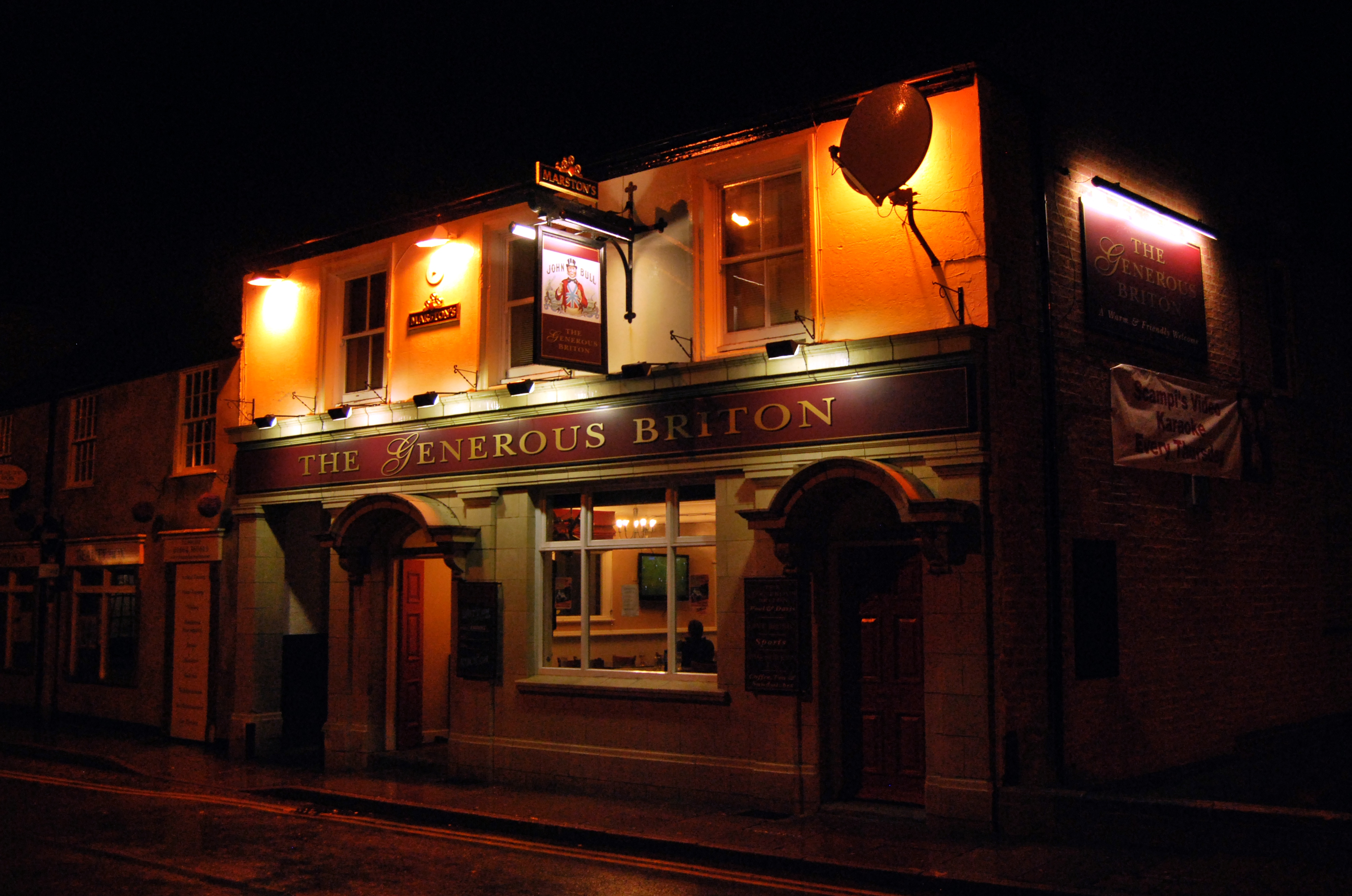
The Generous Briton

== See also ==
- Melton Mowbray Pork Pie Association
- Melton, Victoria, Australia
