= Melton Mowbray Pork Pie Association =

Group of pork pie manufacturers in England, UK

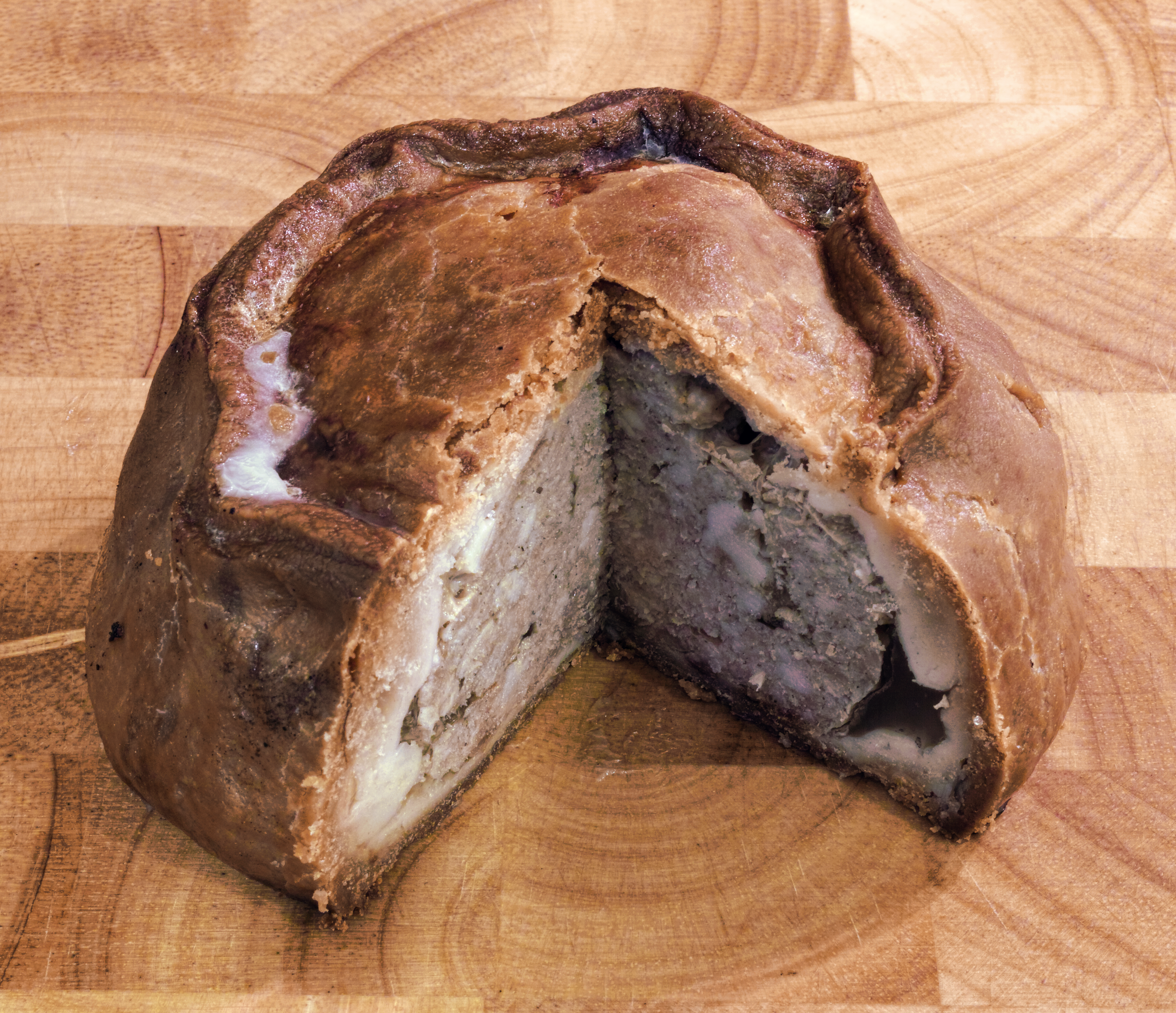
Melton Mowbray pork pie by Dickinson and Morris

The Melton Mowbray Pork Pie Association is a group of pork pie manufacturers in the Melton Mowbray area of England, United Kingdom. The association was set up in 1998 with the aim of helping to protect the Melton Mowbray pork pie recipe.

== Product protection under the EU ==
In 1999 the association, a group of seven local manufacturers, applied to the EU to have their products categorised as having Protected Geographical Indication, to ensure that only pies made in an area around Melton Mowbray could use the Melton Mowbray name.

Northern Foods, a large food corporation, tried to prevent this move over the usage of "Melton Mowbray" on the wrappings of its own pork pies. Northern Foods viewed the situation as unfair and stated in press releases that the MMPPA's dominant member, Samworth Brothers, has made cured and uncured pork pies in Leicester and that the designation area was shaped to include the Samworth factory there. According to Northern Foods, 99% of the pork pies made under the association banner are made by Samworth Brothers. Northern Foods took the matter to the European Court of Justice, but the appeal was eventually withdrawn. Northern Foods' move against the new requirements was dismissed by the High Court.

The PGI application was finally granted on 4 April 2008 and the PGI status came into effect in July 2009.

The name Melton Mowbray can now only be applied to uncured pork-filled pies cooked without supporting hoops and made within an area around the town bounded by the M1, A45, A605, A1 and A52 but including Grantham, Northampton, Nottingham and Stamford, a total of approximately 1,800 square miles (4,700 square kilometres). Permissible ingredients are fresh pork (pies must be at least 30% meat), shortening (usually lard), pork gelatine or stock, wheat flour, water, salt and spices (predominantly pepper). Artificial colours, flavours and preservatives are not allowed.

Prior to PGI status coming into effect, Pork Farms (which had taken over Northern Foods' pork pie interests) announced that their Bowyers factory at Trowbridge in Wiltshire would close with the loss of 400 jobs. Production of the (mainly Melton Mowbray branded) pies was transferred to Nottingham, which is inside the area in which Melton Mowbray pies can be made under the PGI rules.

== Members ==
Members argue that the association provides protection for smaller producers.

Current members are:

- Mrs King's Pork Pies of Cotgrave
- F Bailey & Son of Upper Broughton
- Dickinson & Morris of Melton Mowbray
- Brocklebys of Melton Mowbray
- Mark Patrick Butchers of Birstall
- Walker & Son of Beaumont Leys
- Leesons Butchers of Oakham
- Nelsons Family Butchers of Stamford, Lincolnshire
- Dunkleys of Wellingborough
- Hartland Pies of Cotgrave

== See also ==
- List of United Kingdom food and drink products with protected status
