= Melton Country Park =

Park in Melton Mowbray, United Kingdom

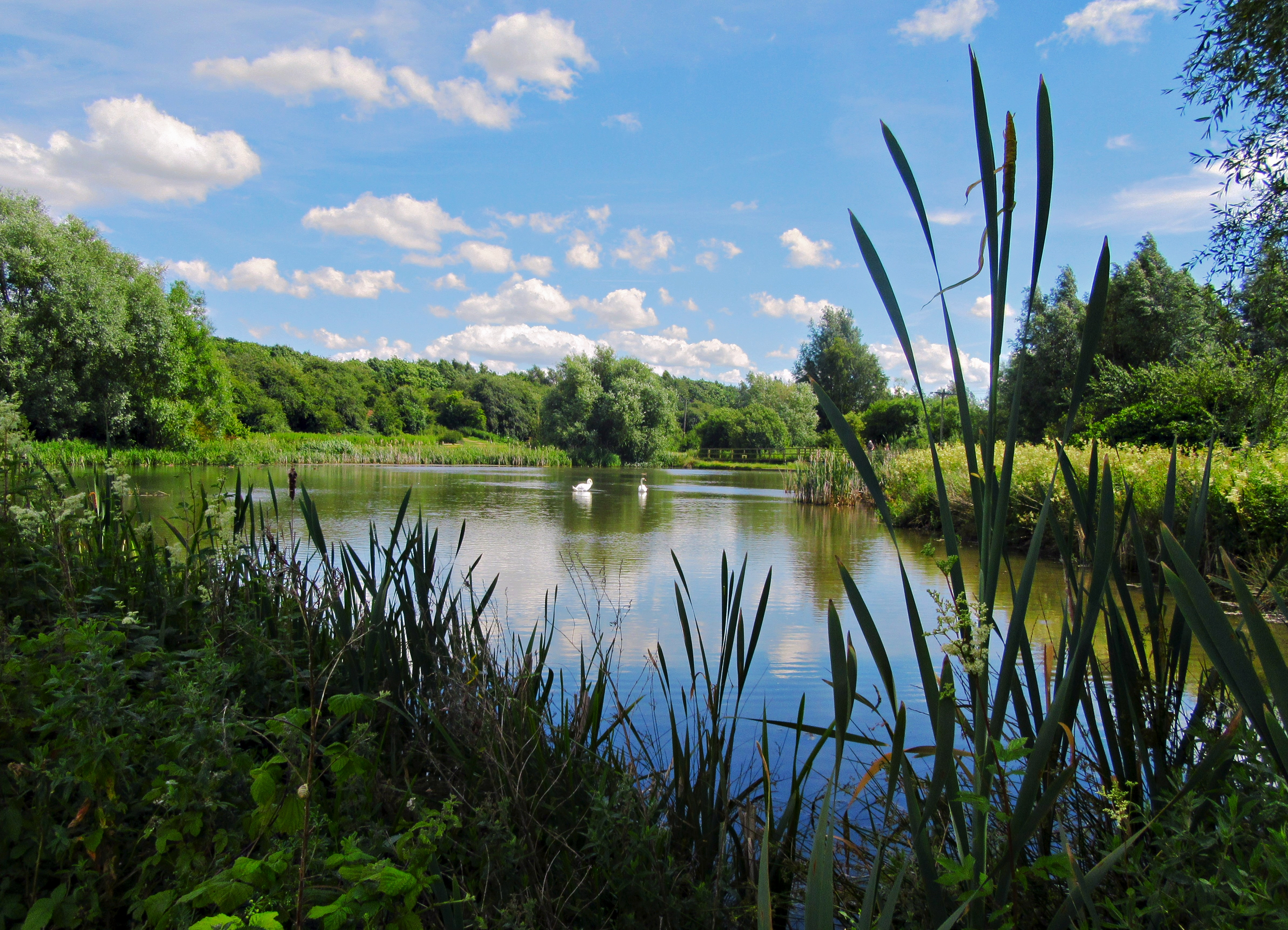
- Interactive map of Melton Country Park
- Type: Country park
- Location: Melton Mowbray, Leicestershire, England
- Coordinates: 52°46′48″N 00°52′40″W
- Area: 55.5 hectares (137 acres)
- Open: All year

Melton Country Park is a country park in Melton Mowbray, Leicestershire, England.

== Facilities ==
The park has a visitor centre, cafe, sensory garden, nature trail, climbing forest, memorial garden, stepping stones, bridges, bird hides, a dam, a troll bridge, sports grounds and cricket fields. A parkrun takes place every week. The park was given a Green Flag Award in 2018.

== Reservoir ==
A reservoir was built in the 1990s to reduce the risk of flooding to properties in Melton from Scalford Brook and sits at the centre of the country park. Since 1996, it has been operated and maintained by the Environment Agency. The dam is designed to cope with a one-in-a-century flood. The park has been planted with trees and shrubs and has a permanent lake which provides wetland habitat for invertebrates, fish and birds. Stepping stones and a footbridge allow walkers to cross the brook.
