= Ankle Hill =

Hill in Leicestershire, England

Coordinates: 52.758°N 0.885°W

Ankle Hill is a hill located in the centre of Melton Mowbray, in Leicestershire.

In February 1645 during the First English Civil War the town of Melton Mowbray was the scene of a battle between Sir Marmaduke Langdale's Royalist force of 1,500 men and the Roundhead garrison commanded by Colonel Sir Edward Rossiter which was stationed in the town. The battle took place on a hillside near the present day town centre, and it is said that the blood of the slaughtered Roundheads pooled ankle deep at its base. Thenceforth the hill was known as Ankle Hill, however at some point in history the names of Dalby Road and Ankle Hill were unintentionally swapped in error, and were never changed back.
