= Pork pie =

English meat pie

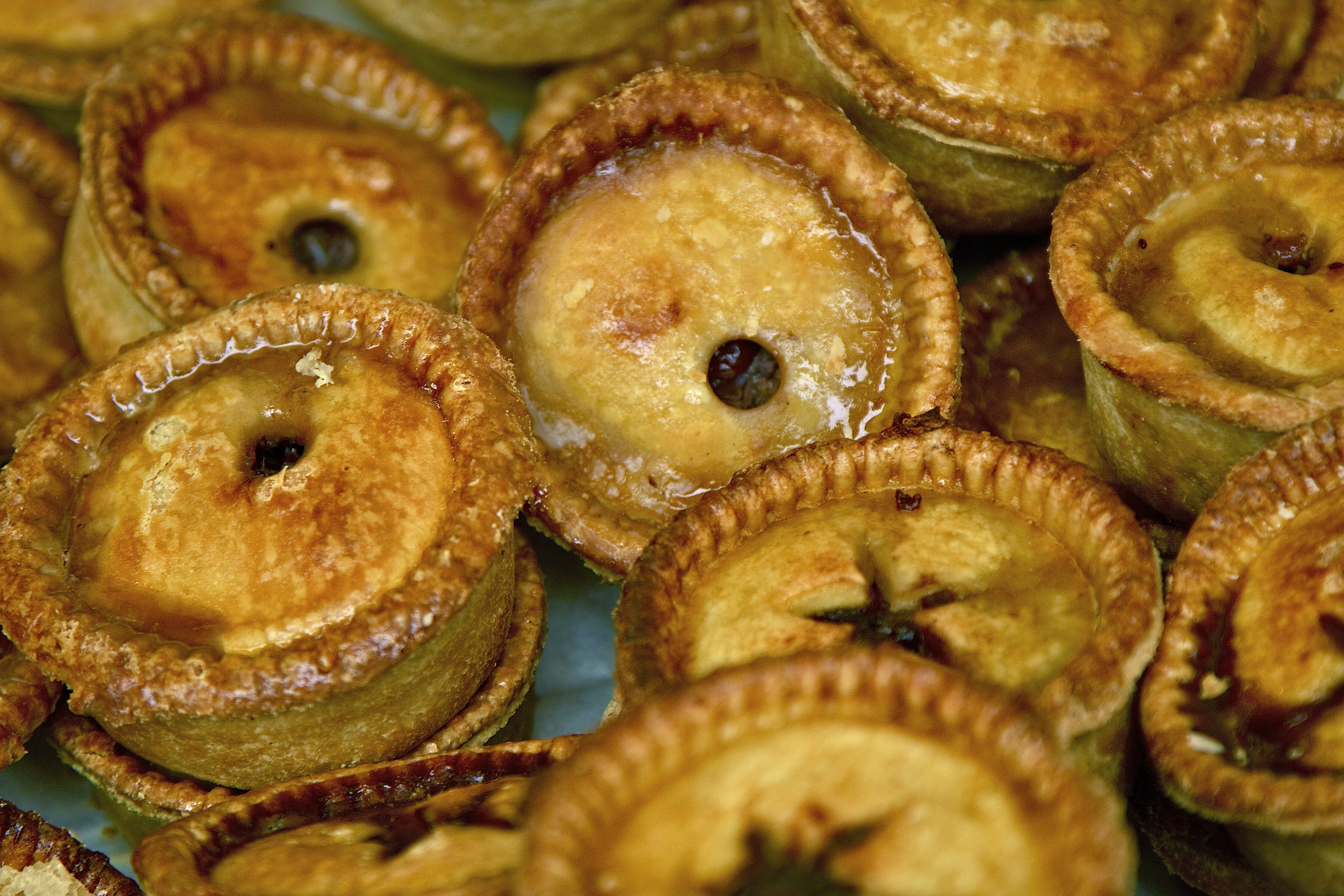
- Pork pies with holes in the crust for jelly or aspic
- Type: Meat pie
- Place of origin: England
- Region or state: England
- Main ingredients: Pork, pork jelly, hot water crust pastry
- Variations: Gala pie, Melton Mowbray Pork Pie

A pork pie is a traditional English meat pie, usually served at room temperature, although occasionally served hot. It consists of a filling of roughly chopped pork and pork fat, surrounded by a layer of jellied pork stock in a hot water crust pastry.

== History ==
Modern pork pies are a direct descendant of the raised meat pies of medieval cuisine, which used a dense hot water crust pastry as a simple means of preserving the filling. In France the same recipes gave rise to the modern pâté en croute. Many medieval meat pie recipes were sweetened, often with fruit, and were meant to be eaten cold: the crust was discarded rather than being eaten. A particularly elaborate and spectacular recipe described in medieval recipe collection The Forme of Cury was a meat pie featuring a crust formed into battlements and filled with sweet custards, the entire pie then being served flambeed: a distant descendant of this dish, with hollow pastry turrets around a central pork pie, was still current in the 18th century under the name "battalia pie". Hannah Glasse's influential 1747 recipe collection included a recipe for a "Cheshire pork pie", having a filling of layers of pork loin and apple, slightly sweetened with sugar, and filled with half a pint (285ml) of white wine. By the 19th century sweetened fruit and meat combinations had become less common, and the raised crust pork pie took its modern form.

== Types ==
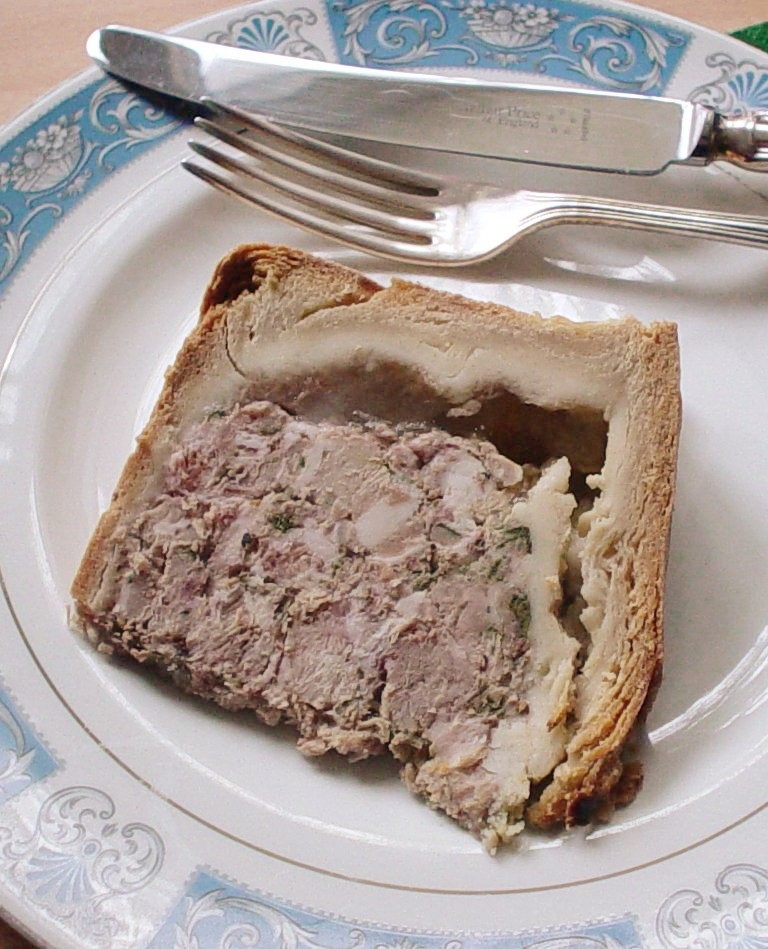
Traditional pork pie is served cold

Traditionally, pie recipes use a mix of fat and cured meat, with a mixture of salt and saltpetre used for curing, giving the filling a pink colour after cooking. They are often produced in moulds or forms, giving the outside of the pie a very regular shape. This method is simpler and cheaper for volume production, and hence the more common choice for commercial manufacturers.

As the meat shrinks when the pie is cooked, traditional recipes specified that clarified butter or a hot pork stock was poured into the pie after baking. This would set when cool, filling the gap between meat and pastry and preventing air from reaching the filling and causing it to spoil. Commercial makers use a 6% solution of gelatin at between 80 and 90 °C (176 and 194 °F), added into the pie immediately after baking.

=== Melton Mowbray pork pie ===
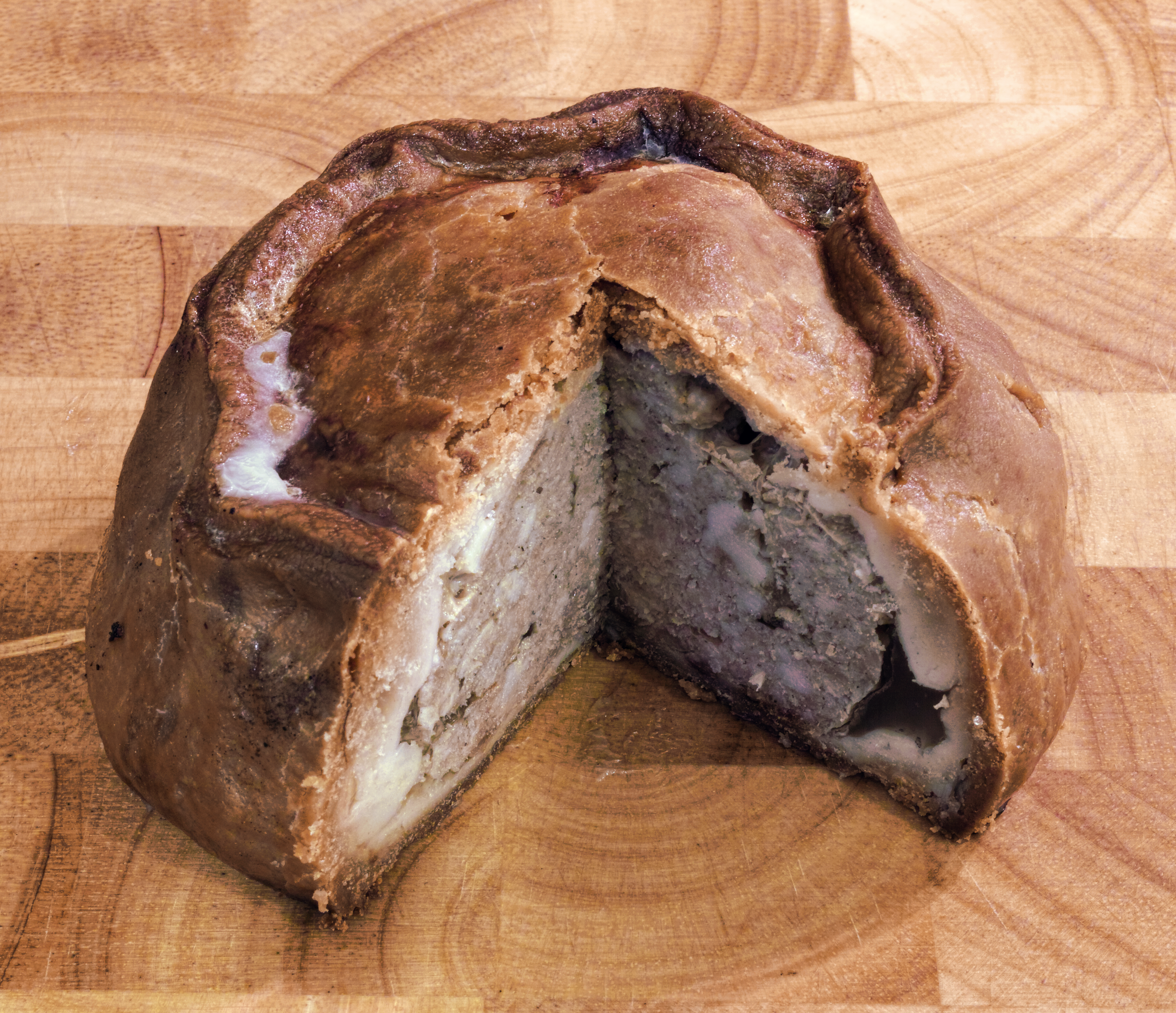
A Melton Mowbray pork pie

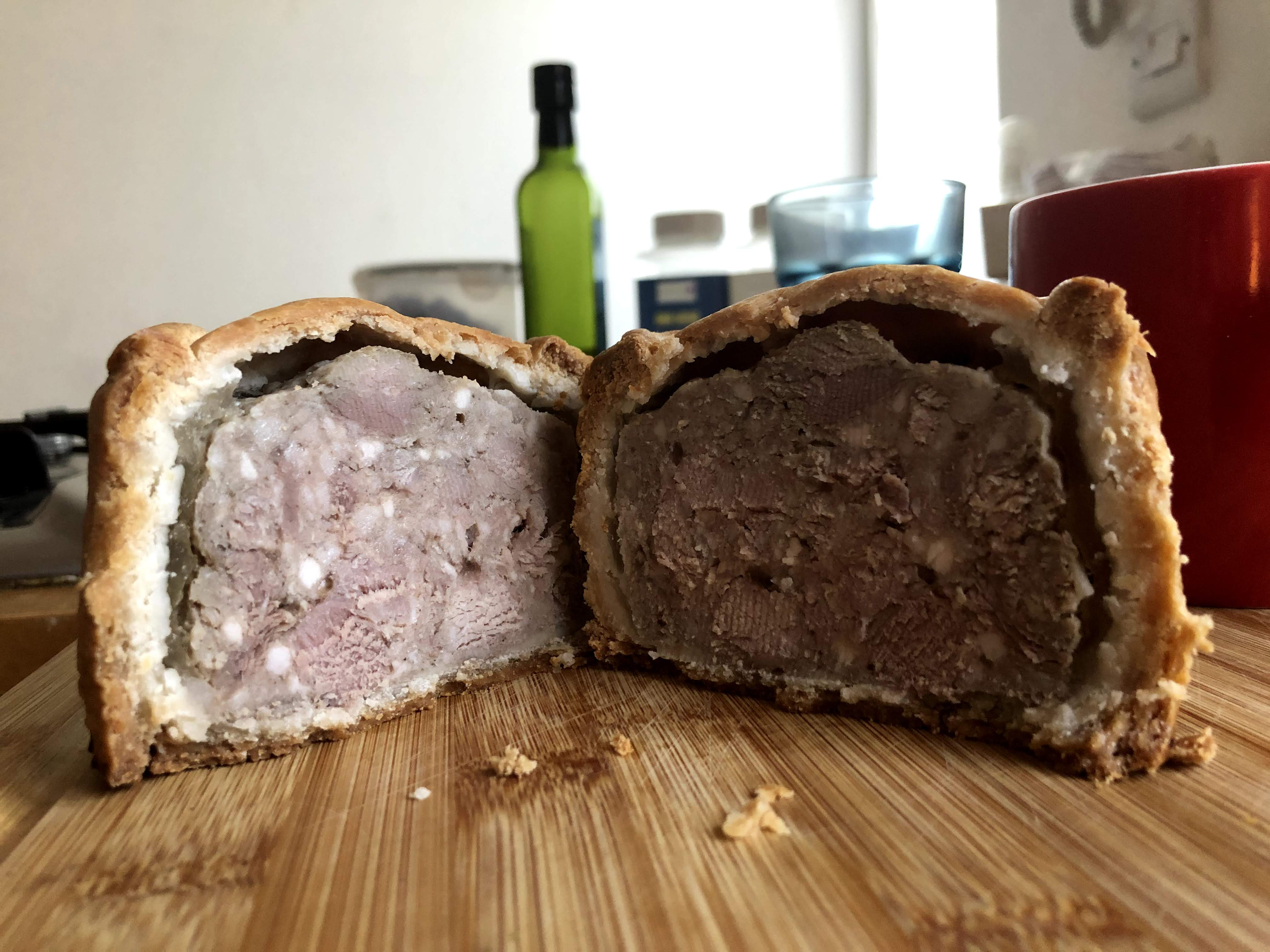
Large pork pie cut in half

The Melton Mowbray pork pie is named after Melton Mowbray, a town in Leicestershire. While it is sometimes claimed that Melton pies became popular among fox hunters in the area in the late eighteenth century, it has also been stated that the association of the pork pie trade with Melton originated around 1831 as a sideline in a small baker and confectioners' shop in the town, owned by Edward Adcock. Within the next decade a number of other bakers then started supplying them, notably Enoch Evans, a former grocer, who seems to have been particularly responsible for establishing the industry on a large scale. Whether true or not the association with hunting provided valuable publicity, although one local hunting columnist writing in 1872 stated that it was extremely unlikely that "our aristocratic visitors carry lumps of pie with them on horseback".

The main distinctive feature of a Melton pie is that it is made with a hand-formed crust. The modern definition of Melton pies specifies that the recipe should use uncured meat, which is grey in colour when cooked; however Dorothy Hartley in her 1954 Food in England noted that "a small amount of anchovy sauce [...] made the Melton Mowbray pies pink inside, whereas in most other districts the meat content of the pies is brownish, or grey".

In the light of the premium price of the Melton Mowbray pie, the Melton Mowbray Pork Pie Association applied to the European Union for protection as a protected geographic indication as a result of the increasing production of Melton Mowbray-style pies by large commercial companies in factories far from Melton Mowbray, and recipes that deviated from the original uncured pork form. Protection was granted on 4 April 2008, with the result that only pies made within within a 28-square-kilometre (10.8 sq mi) zone around the town, and using the traditional recipe including uncured pork, are allowed to carry the Melton Mowbray name on their packaging.

There is a tradition in the East Midlands of eating pork pies for breakfast at Christmas. While its origin is unclear, the association of pork pies with Christmas dates back to at least the mid-19th century and it was by far the busiest time of year for the Melton manufacturers.

=== Pork pies in Yorkshire ===
In Yorkshire, pork pies are often served hot, accompanied with gravy or with mushy peas and mint sauce. Pork pies with peas were noted to be available in "most" town pubs in the West Riding. It is also a common combination served at Bonfire Night celebrations. In Yorkshire slang a pork pie is sometimes called a "growler", a term probably derived from the "NAAFI growler" of earlier naval and army slang.

An annual pork pie competition is held in April at The Old Bridge Inn, Ripponden, Yorkshire.

== Variations ==
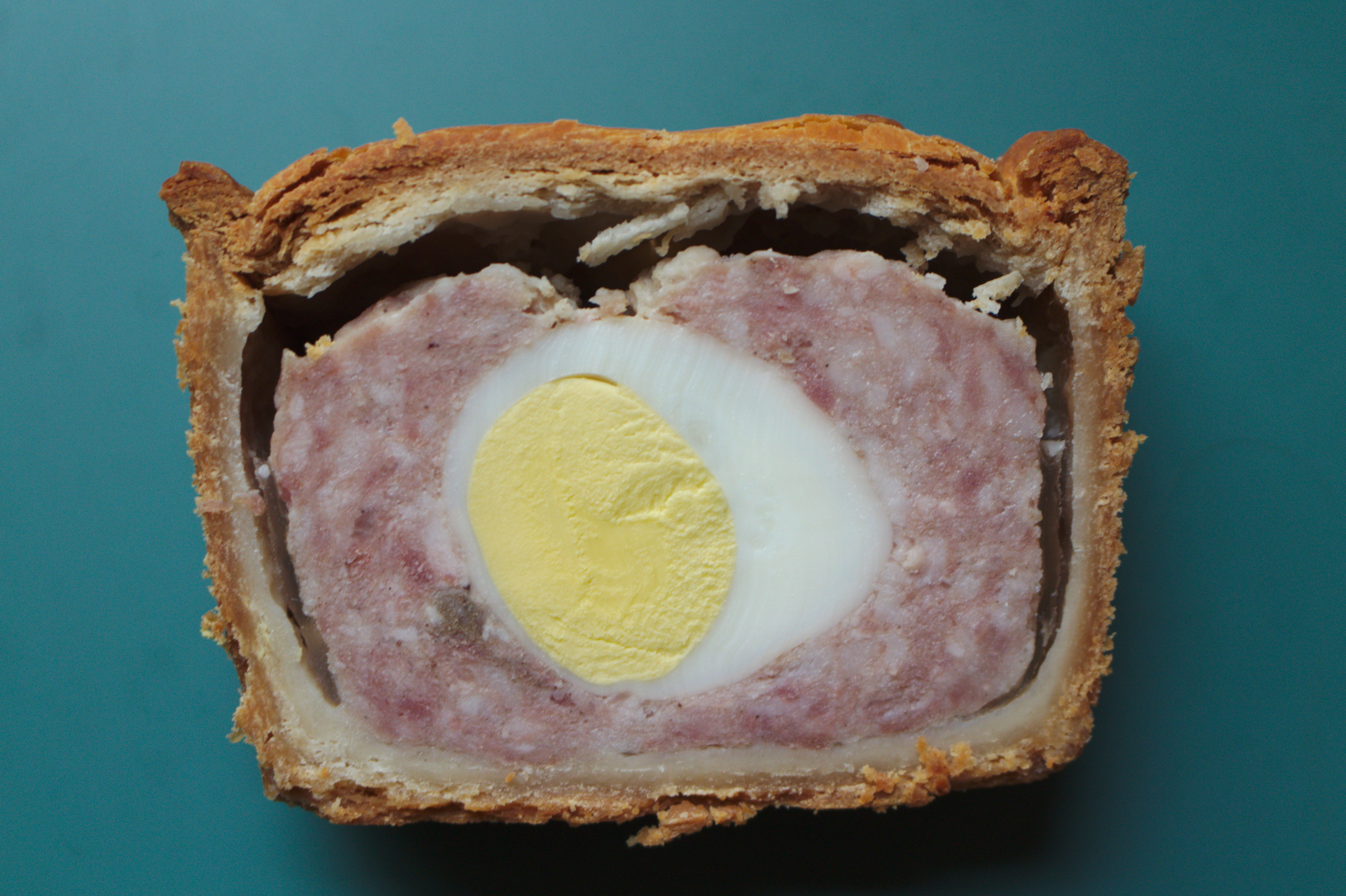
Gala pie

The gala pie (also known as a Grosvenor pie) is a variety of pork pie where the filling includes a proportion of chicken and a hard-boiled egg. Gala pies are often baked in long, loaf-type tins, with several eggs arranged along the centre, or blended into a single 'infinite egg' by poaching in sausage casing.

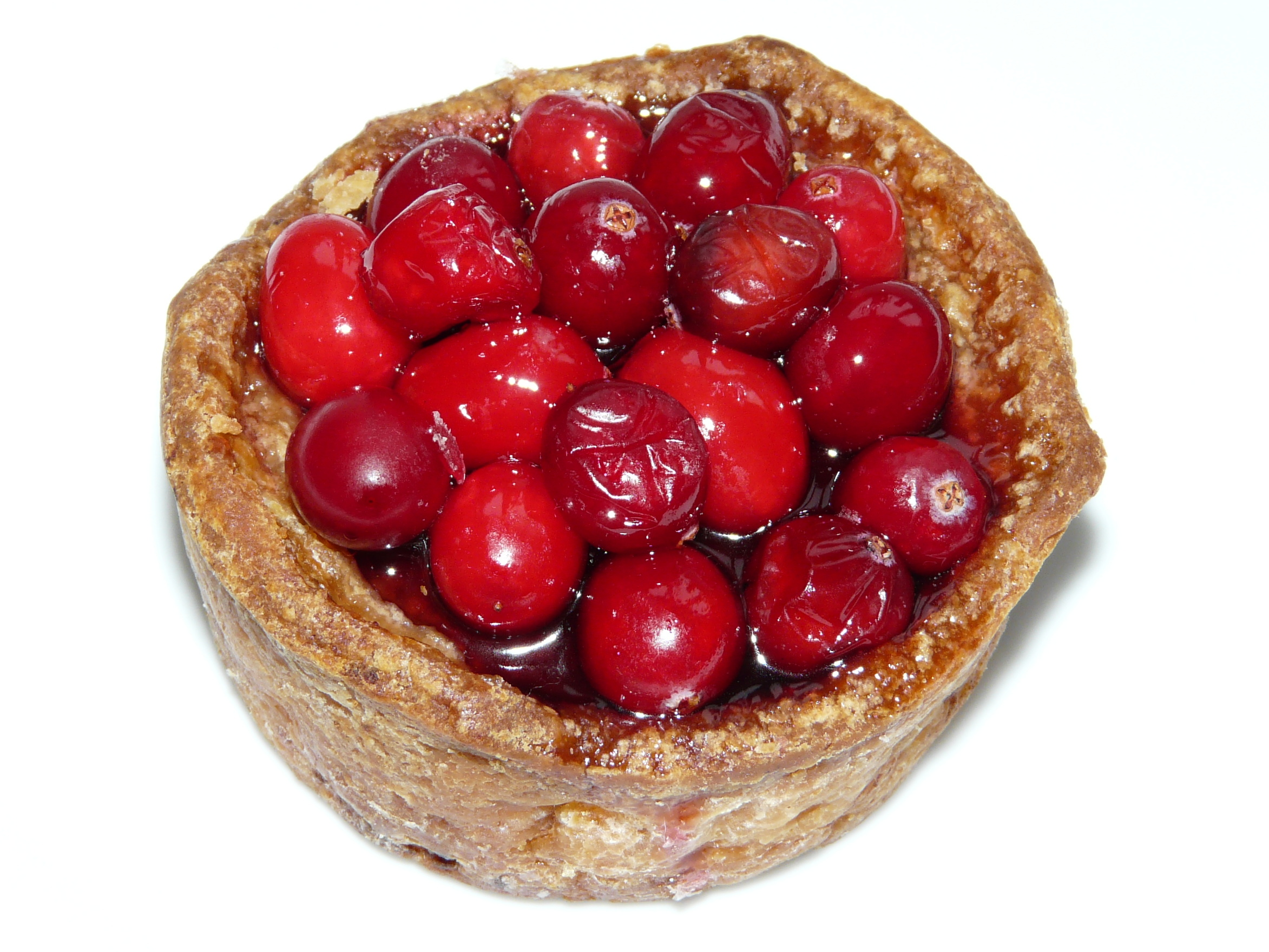
Pork and cranberry picnic pie

Smaller, 8 to 13 cm (3 to 5 in), varieties, sometimes branded as a "picnic pie", often have additional ingredients added to the filling such as apples, pickles and bacon.

In some cases the solid pastry top is replaced by a pastry lattice, allowing the meat filling to be seen, though according to the British Pie Awards, a pork pie should be completely enclosed. A recent development is to have a layer of Branston pickle inserted under the lattice crust. Occasionally the top crust is dispensed with altogether in favour of a layer of cranberries sealed into place with aspic.

A 'huntsman pork pie' can refer to a pie combining a variety of meats, including pork, chicken and a layer of stuffing.

== See also ==
- Pork pie hat, so called because of its resemblance to a pork pie
- In Cockney rhyming slang "pork pies" (telling "porkies") are "lies"
- Rabbit pie
- Tourtière, a Québécois meat pie typically made with pork
- Meat pie
- List of pies, tarts and flans
