= Harby, Leicestershire =

Village in Leicestershire, England

Coordinates: 52.87221°N 0.89313°W

Harby
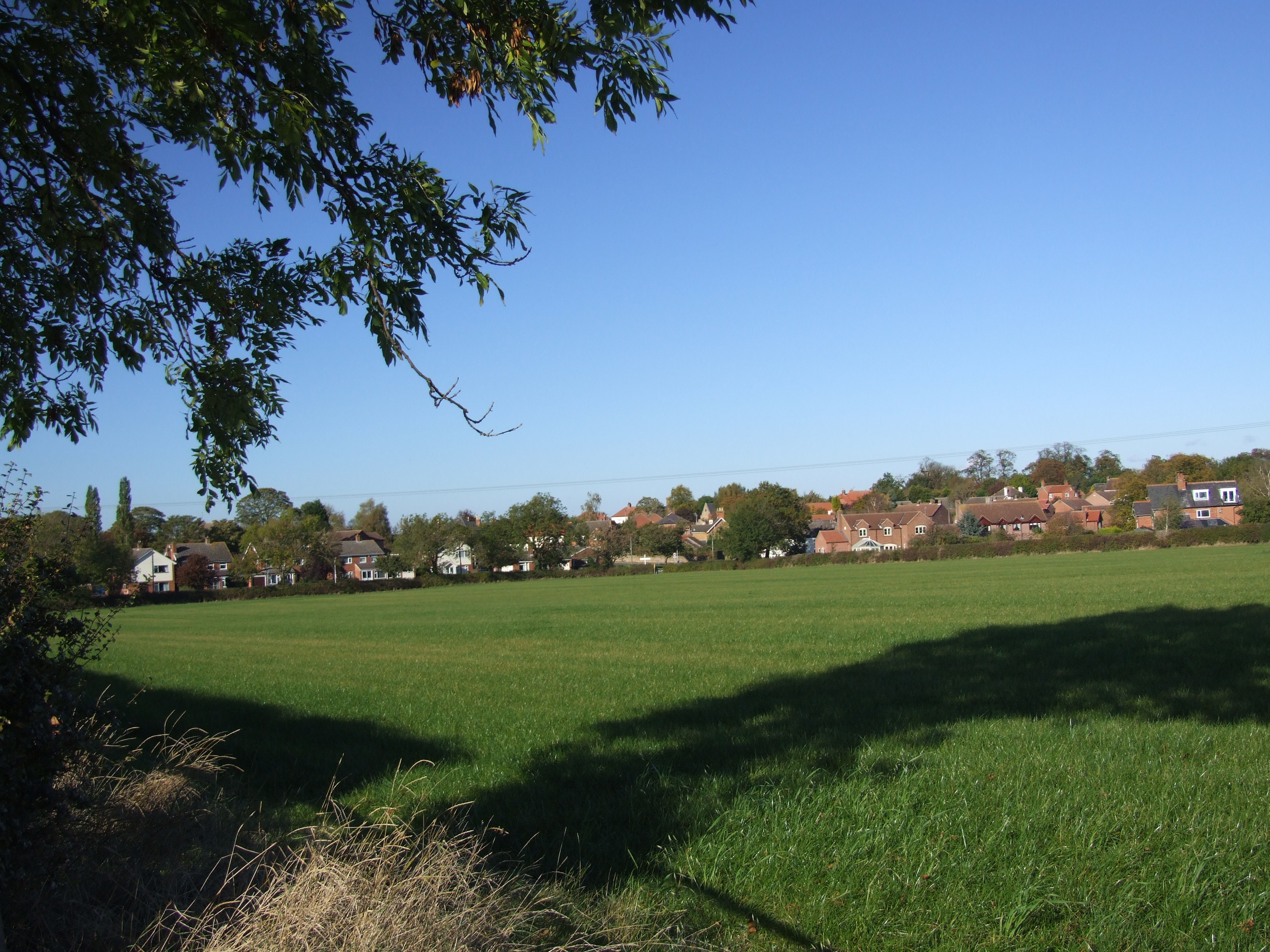
- Harby from the south – Waltham Road

- Location within Leicestershire
- OS grid reference: SK7449331135
- Civil parish: Clawson, Hose and Harby
- District: Melton
- Shire county: Leicestershire
- Region: East Midlands
- Country: England
- Sovereign state: United Kingdom
- Post town: Melton Mowbray
- Postcode district: LE14
- Dialling code: 01949
- Police: Leicestershire
- Fire: Leicestershire
- Ambulance: East Midlands
- UK Parliament: Melton and Syston

Harby is an English village and a former civil parish, now in the parish of Clawson, Hose and Harby, in the Melton district, in the county of Leicestershire. It lies in the Vale of Belvoir, 9.4 miles (15.1 km) north of Melton Mowbray and 13.9 miles (22.4 km) west-south-west of Grantham. Although in Leicestershire, the county town of Leicester is further – 21.4 miles (34.4 km) – than Nottingham – 15.7 miles (25.3 km). The village lies on the south side of the Grantham Canal. Belvoir Castle, 6 miles (9.7 km) to the north-east, is conspicuous on the horizon.

== Location and governance ==
The population in 2001/2002 was listed as 864 individuals, with 698 on the electoral register and 376 houses. This increased at the 2011 census to 931 and was estimated in 2016 to be 877.

Harby is in the Melton and Syston constituency; the current MP is the Conservative Edward Argar. It shares its civil parish council with Long Clawson and Hose. In local government it comes under Melton Borough Council and Leicestershire County Council.

There are similarly named villages: Harby in Nottinghamshire, Hårby in Denmark and in Sweden.

== History ==
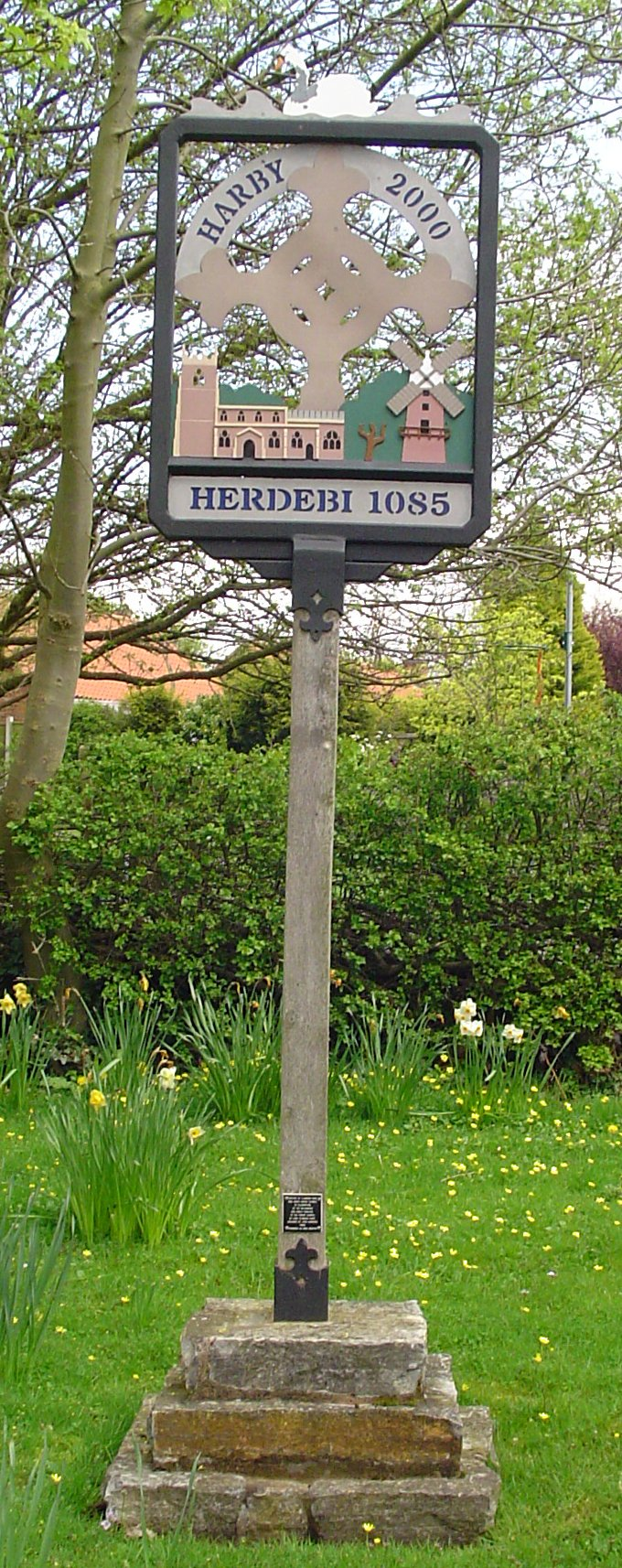
Herdebi 1085 – Harby 2000

Old names for the village include Hereby, Herdby, Hedeby, and Harteby. The first element "Har" either derives from the old Scandinavian "hiorth" meaning herd, flock, or the old Norse personal name "Herrothr", found in old Danish as "Heroth". The second element is the old Scandinavian "by", meaning a village or homestead.

The Domesday Book of 1086 listed Harby as in the possession of Robert de Stafford:

Robert de Tosny. He owned 17 carucates of land at Harby. In the time of Edward the Confessor it was 14 ploughs. Three of these carucates were held directly by Robert with 8 slaves. 13 of the ploughs were leased to 24 freemen, 7 villagers and 3 smallholders. There were meadows measuring 5 furlongs long and 5 furlongs wide. This land now brought in £5 a year; it used to be £4. Robert de Bucy owns 1 carucute of land at Harby and leases it to Gerard. The land takes 1 plough to work it. Gerard sub-leases it to 2 freeman and 3 smallholders. Its value is 5 shillings.

In 1622 William Burton described in his book The Description of Leicester Shire (page 127).

"Harby, in olde deedes written Herdeby in the Hundred of Framland, standing in the Vale of Bever upon the border of Nottinghamshire. In the 20. yeere of Edward the third, William Lord Ros, and John de Oreby held lands heere. In the 44. yeere of Edward the third, Roger Delaware was Lord of this Mannor. In the 25. of Henry the eight the Lord Delaware was Lord of this Mannor as it appeareth by an Inquisition taken after the death of Sir John Digby Knight, in the said 25.yeere of Henry the eight, where it was found that the said Sir John Digby held 4. messuages (with the appurtenances in Harby) of the said Lord Delaware, as of his Mannor of Harby. In this Towne was borne Jeffrey de Hardby a famous Dvuine, brought up in Oxford, and after became one of the Canons of the Abbey of Leicester; from whence he came to be Confessor to King Edward the third, and was by him made one of his Privy Council of state. He wrote many books of special note in Divinity, and died in London, and was buried in the Austin Fryers. Here also was borne Robert de Hardby, a Frier Carmelite in Lincolne, who wrote something in praise of the saide Order, and lived 1450. Ecclesia de Herdeby Patronus Willimus de Albaniaco persona Mr.Robertus institutes per Hug.nunc Episcopum Lincoln. The new Patron of this Church is Francis Earle of Rutland. This Rectory is valued in the King's books at 20 pounds."

In 1815 John Nichols described Harby in his book The History and Antiquities of the County of Leicestershire.

"Harby... is destitute of woods and streams; no high road leads through or beside it. A heavy clay spreads over every acre in the parish and the uniform operations of husbandry give a sameness to the country, which a stranger might view with disgust; but cultivation has made it fruitful.... Industry here makes the prospect, and the product alone is the beauty of the soil. There are about 1800 acres in the parish; and, whilst the field continued open, the method of tillage was, first-year fallow; second, barley and wheat; third, beans and pease. The families of Harby are 60, its inhabitants 322, among whom are many small freeholders. There is no mansion or ancient building in the village; but the present rector has lately built a neat and convenient house...."

In 1831 the Reverend John Curtis described Harby in his book, A Topographical History of the County of Leicester.

Harby, Herdebi, Hertebi

In 1535 the Rectory was valued at £201. The parish was inclosed in 1790.
At the general survey in 1086, Robert de Todenei (Robert de Todeni) held 17 carucates, 3 ploughs were in the demesne; 8 bondmen, 24 socmen, 7 villans and 3 bordars, had 13 ploughs; there was a meadow 200 perches long and 160 broads.
Gerard held under Robert de Buci 1 carucate, the land was equal to 1 plough, which was held by 3 bordars and 2 socmen.
In 1297 Lambert de Tryckenham held 2 Virgates.
In 1302 Robert Tateshall held half a fee.
In 1343 William Ros, of Hamlake, held a fee.
In 1363 Margery Ros held a fee and the advowson.
In 1370 Roger le Warre and Alianora, his wife, held the manor.
In 1391 Simon Pakeman and Agnes, his wife held 12 messuages.
In 1394 Maria, wife of John de Ros held one-eighth of a fee.
In 1396 Robert Hauberk, an outlaw, held 1 messuage and 7 bovates.
In 1412 John West held the manor.
In 1416 Thomas West held the manor.
In 1427 Sir Reginald West, Lord Delawarre, held it.
In 1450 Reginald West held it. Edward IV. granted lands here to William Hastings, and in 1481 he held lands and messuage and Gracedieu Priory held lands.
In 1552 William Brabazon held half the manor.

In 1642 Andrew Collins held it, whose family sold it to the Earl of Rutland.

In 1931 the parish had a population of 608. On 1 April 1936 the civil parish was merged with Hose and Long Clawson to form "Clawson and Harby", which is now called Clawson, Hose and Harby.

== Primary school ==
Harby Church of England Primary School began as a church school founded by the National Society for Promoting Religious Education. It opened under the Rector, William Evans Hartopp, in about 1827, on land donated by John Manners, 5th Duke of Rutland.

School in 1895

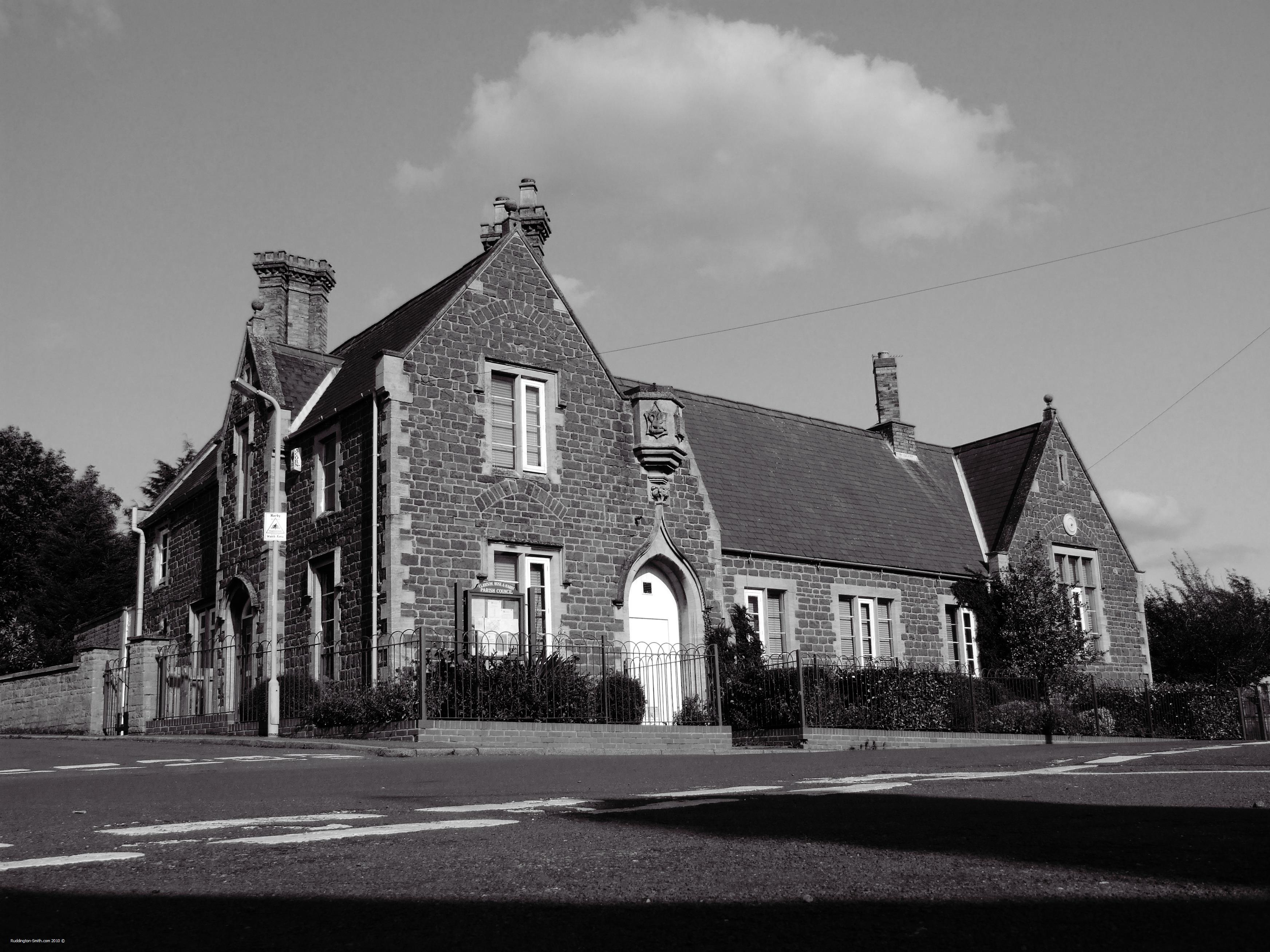
School in 2005

A new school building opened on 25 March 1861, probably on the site of a village green, under a church committee headed by Rev. Manners Octavius Norman, at a cost of £861 3s 4d. The surveyors and architects were Bellamy and Hardy of Lincoln. It had two main teaching classrooms, a large kitchen, toilets to the rear, and accommodation for the teacher consisting of a downstairs study and three upper rooms. The first headmaster was Henry Major. The county council took over management on 1 July 1903.

Originally there was a bell tower above the front door, of which only the base remains intact. A swan (as an emblem of the school) and a book are carved on either side of the base. In 1976 the school was extended with three new open-plan classroom areas. One old schoolroom was converted into a studio and TV room. A new kitchen was built at the rear and a boiler house in the style of the old school added.

A letter from Nick Gibb MP, Minister of State for School Standards, sent in February 2018, states that the school was in the top 1 per cent of primary schools in England for attainment in reading and writing, based in 2017 KS2 results. The school has just under 100 pupils aged 4 to 11. Harby Pre-School has closed. However, the latest full Ofsted report in March 2019 was critical in some respects.

The Friends of Harby School support school activities and organise the Belvoir Challenge, an annual 26- or 15-mile cross-country race with a limit of 1200 participants.

== Methodist chapel ==
Methodists had begun to hold services from 1769 in their homes, and then in an old coach house given by William Orson for chapel conversion in April 1828. By 1847 the Wesleyan congregation had outgrown the coach house, which was replaced by a chapel built on Orson's land. The foundation stone was laid by C. H. Clark, a Nottingham solicitor, and opening sermons were preached by Rev. John Rattenbury and Rev. James Everett. In 1874 it was refurbished.

In 1926 a new two-manual pipe organ by E. Wragg & Son of Nottingham was installed at a cost of £210, but it was removed when the chapel was modernised for its current use by the Vale Christian Fellowship.

== Parish church ==
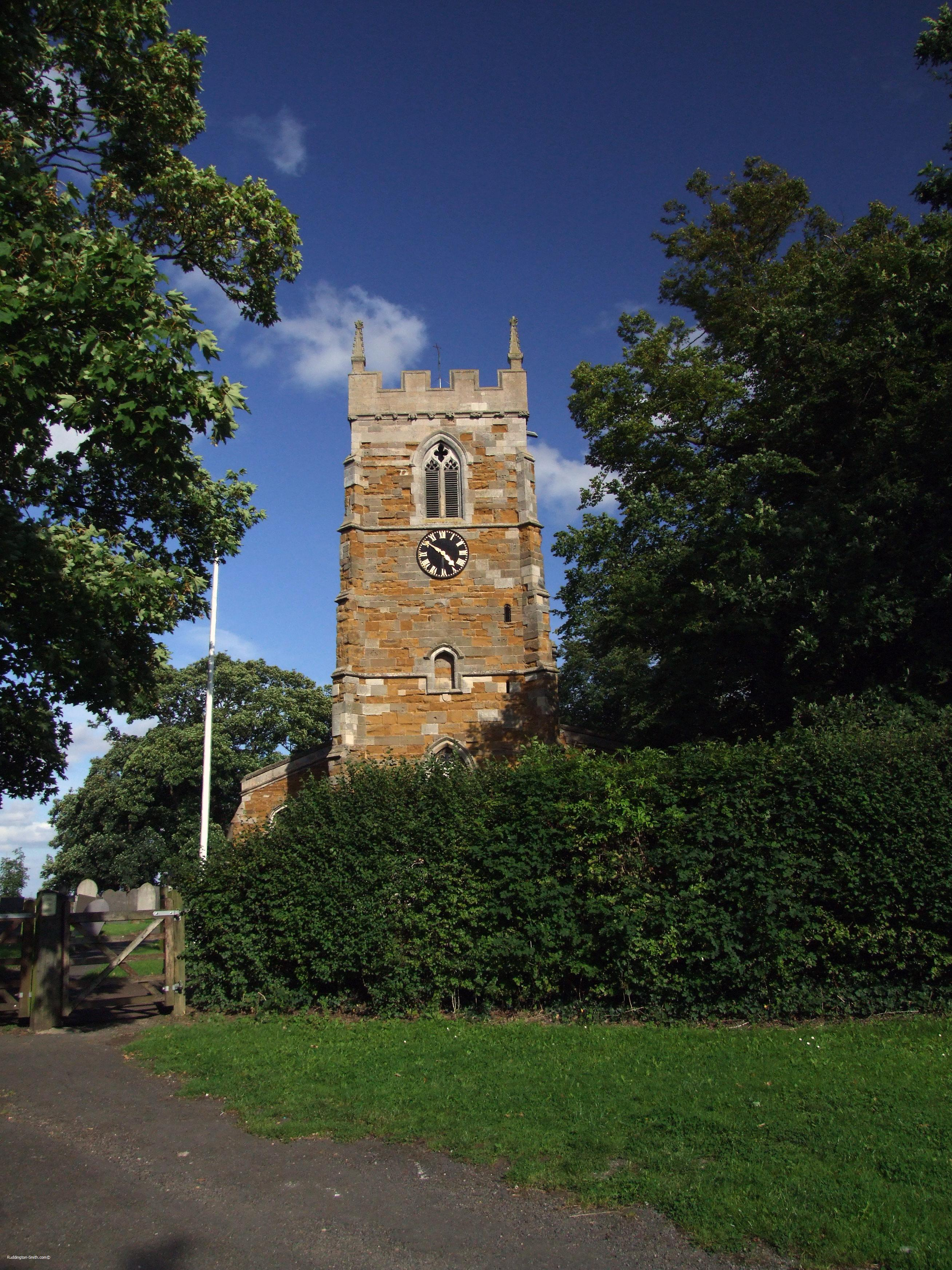
Church of St Mary the Virgin, Harby

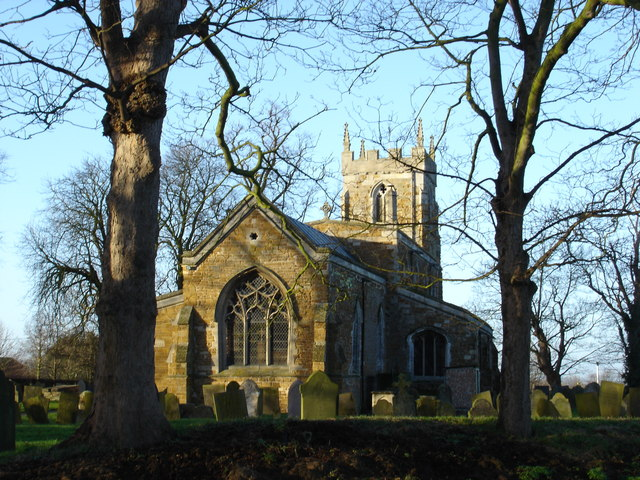
St Mary's Church, Harby

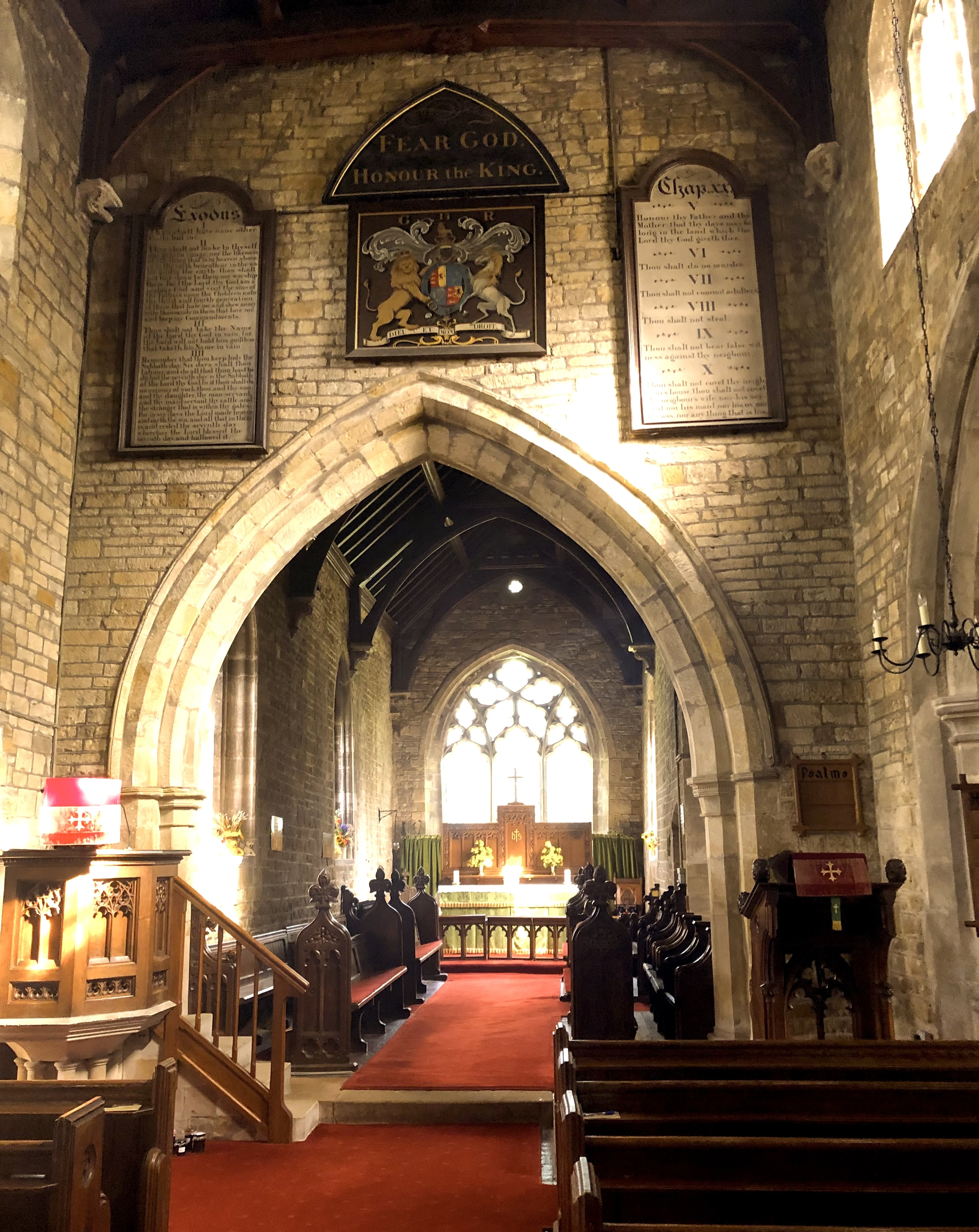
Inside of Parish Church, Harby

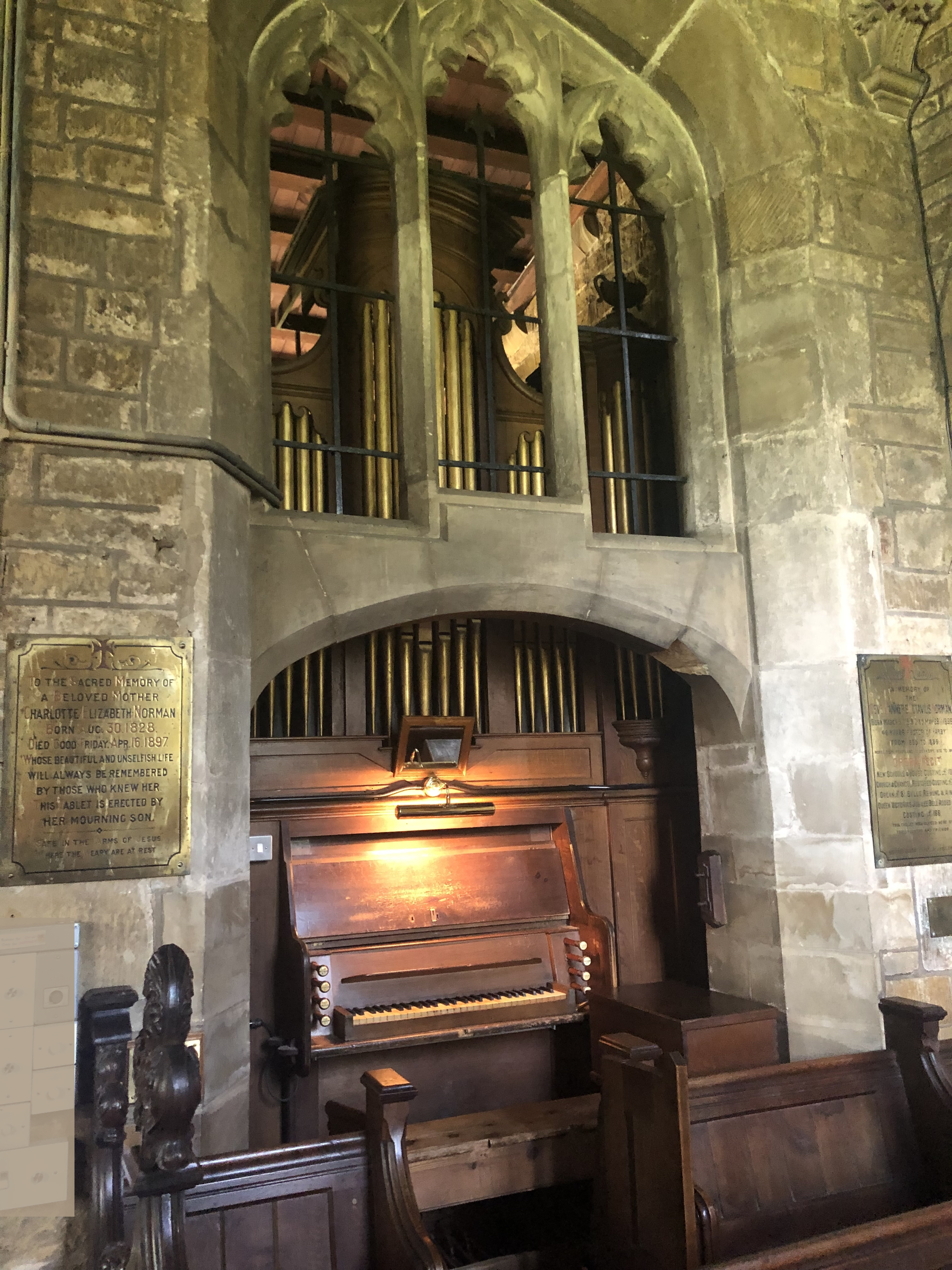
Elliot Organ - St Mary the Virgin Parish Church, Harby

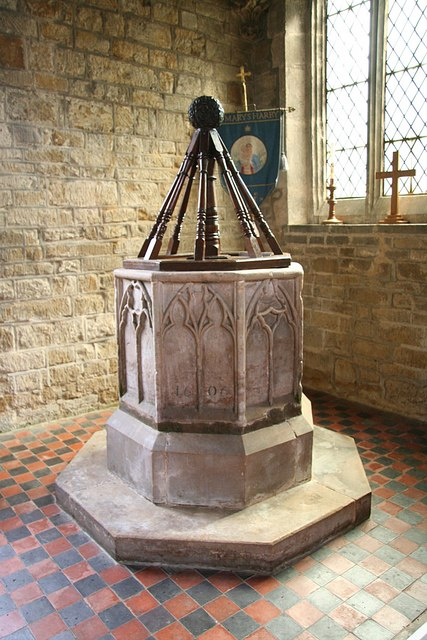
St Mary's font

The parish church at Harby is dedicated to St Mary the Virgin.

The earliest church on the site was probably made of wood, of which there is evidence in the west wall of the nave. The earliest written notice appears in the records of the Bishop of Lincoln, recording a priest at Harby in 1220 called Robert. In the 13th century, the present stone tower was built at the west end of the nave and the wooden nave and chancel were rebuilt in stone. The nave was widened, so that its walls joined the tower at the west end, on the outer edges of the tower buttresses.

The chancel roof was raised in about 1350 and new windows were added.

The first window in the north wall of the chancel nearest to the nave has three panes showing the letter W or VV. It stands for "Virgo virginum", "virgin of virgins" for the dedication of the church to the Blessed Virgin Mary. This is the only stained glass in the building. We do not know if this is left from Mediaeval times when all other stained glass was deliberately removed, or dates from after the Reformation in 1539.

A Victorian restoration took place in 1874–1876, the flagstone flooring being replaced by tiles. New pews in the chancel were decorated in the Gothic style. In 1874 the roof was renewed. In 1903, a vestry was built and the organ was placed to face into the chancel. The font was moved again to the east end of the north aisle.

On the wall above the arch at the east end of the nave are four panels. The middle two are wooden boards. One has the coat of arms of George II (reigned 1727–1760). The board above bears the inscription "Fear God, Honour the King". The other two panels show the ten commandments on canvas in wooden frames.

On 29 May 1839 William Aubrey de Vere Beauclerk, 9th Duke of St Albans (1801–1849) married Elizabeth Catherine Gubbins, the daughter of Maj. Gen. Joseph Gubbins (1785–1817). As a celebration, he donated to the church a new clock by James Henfrey of Leicester, a bible, a prayer book, and £30 with the rector to be invested for the poor. This marriage was held at Harby because Elizabeth Catherine Gubbins was the first cousin to Eliza Georgiana Gubbins who was the first wife of the Rector William Evens Hartopp. Eliza Georgiana Gubbins father was George Stamer Gubbins of Kilfrush, Co. Limerick. His brother was Maj. Gen. Joseph Gubbins of Kilfrush. His daughter was Elizabeth Catherine Gubbins.

Harby Church became a Grade II* listed building in 1968.

=== Bells ===
There are five bells in the tower dating from as early as 1610.

Bell	Weight	Note	Diameter	Cast	Founder	Inscription
1	4–2–21	D#	27.88"	1887	John Taylor & Co	"JUBILEE 1887. GOD SAVE THE QUEEN" "CHRIST REIGNETH EVER" E. HALL. T. FRECK, WARDENS"; It cost £186 when cast and commemorates the Golden Jubilee of Queen Victoria.
2	4–3–7	C#	29.25"	1610	Henry II Oldfield	"JESUS BE OUR SPEED"; This was the pancake bell, rung at 11 a. m. on Shrove Tuesday to remind housewives to prepare the pancake mixture.
3	5–0–9	B#	30.75"	1610	Henry II Oldfield	"GOD SAVE THE CHURCH"
4	7–2–0	A#	34.25"	1701	William Noone	"GOD SAVE HIS CHURCH" R. WHITTLE, I. BROOKBANK, WARDENS
5	8–2–16	G#	37.75"	1614	Henry II Oldfield	"GLORY BE TO GOD ON HIGH". The tenor or passing bell, rung to record a death is the heaviest in the tower.

=== Pipe organ ===
The organ in Harby parish church as listed on the National Pipe Organ Register.

Built by Thomas Elliot and installed at Gedling Parish Church, Nottinghamshire by Elliot's foreman Alexander Buckingham in 1808. The organ was built at Thomas Elliot's works in Tottenham Court Road, London.

It was removed from Gedling at a cost of more than £80 and transported to Harby in 1874, where it was first installed at an additional cost of £11 in the northeast corner of the north aisle, where the font stands now. When a new vestry was built in 1903, the organ was moved to face north into the chancel choir.

The organ has been maintained by Hawkins, organ builders of Walsall, West Midlands, who were initially requested to quote for an electric blower in 1945. Thereafter they overhauled and cleaned the organ in 1956 and 1975.

In 2025 the Elliot pipe organ was awarded a Historic Organ Certificate - Grade II. This is endorsed by BIOS - The British Institute of Organ Studies. This will ensure the safe keeping of the organ as a Historic instrument and will enhance any further campaign to restore the organ for the future.

=== Font ===
The font is from the Decorated period and presumably stood in the pre-Reformation position by the front door, in line with Catholic practice. The date 1606 may indicate when it was moved. After the Reformation, the font was moved again into the centre of the church and remained there until 1834. The font now stands in the northeast corner of the north aisle where the organ sat before the vestry was built in 1901.

=== Parish registers ===
The parchment skins of an early volume of Harby Parish Registers, long lost, are said to have been unstitched and wrapped around the trunk and limbs of the corpse of Anne Adcock, and so buried by her grandson, John Adcock, a man of eccentric character, in December 1776. Some transcripts exist at Lincoln for the years 1604, 1606 to 1609 and 1618; and at Leicester for 1581, 1612–1613, 1617, 1621, 1625–1629, 1632–1634, 1636–1638, 1661–1663, 1670, 1672, 1674–1683, 1685, 1687–1688, 1690–1691 and 1694–1700.

=== Incumbents ===
Year	Name	Position	Alma mater	notes
1220	Robert	Instituted by Hugh of Wells Bishop of Lincoln Rector Harby, Leicestershire		Patron: William de albini II
1235	William de Herdeby	Chaplain of Harby Leicestershire		Patron: William de albini III Was included in original John Nichols (printer) listing. No further listing available
1251–1275	Thomas de Bathon	Subdeacon		Patron: Robert Lord Ros Was included in original John Nichols (printer) listing. No further listing available
1275	Lambert de Trikingham	Subdeacon		Patron: Robert Lord Ros Lambert de Trinkinham is of a gentleman estimated to have been born between 1261 and Died 1280 at Threekingham, Lincolnshire. He was made Sir. There are life stone effigies of Lambert de Trikingham and his wife at St Peter's Church, Threekingham, Lincolnshire. In 1831 the Reverend John Curtis described Harby in "A Topographical History of the County of Leicester", Lambert de Trinkinham as owning 2 Virgates He may have been the advowson. Was included in original John Nichols (printer) listing as Priest.
1298	William de Keln			Patron: William Lord Ros I Was included in original John Nichols (printer) listing. No further listing for William de Keln. However a Listing for William de Kelm as Priest of Harby, Nottinghamshire was present at the death of Queen Eleanor wife of Edward I By 13 November the Queen's health was obviously failing and the court left Clipstone heading for Lincoln, possibly intending to visit the shrine of St Hugh to pray for her recovery. However, on 20 November Eleanor was brought to the manor house of Richard de Weston in Harby (Notts) suffering from a “slow fever” and in the ensuing days her health deteriorated rapidly. The local priest, William de Kelm, and the Bishop of Lincoln, Oliver Sutton, were at her deathbed when she died during the evening of 28 November 1290.
1336	Gilbert	Rector (ecclesiastical)		Patron: William Lord Ros I Was included in original John Nichols (printer) listing. No further listing available
1343	John de Langtoft	Rector of West Hanningfield 1334; Rector of Walton, Lincolnshire 1336; Rector of Eriswell, Suffolk 1337; Rector of Harby, Leicestershire; King's clerk by 1338; Protection on going overseas on the king's service granted 1338; A keeper of the temporalities of the see of Canterbury sede vacante 1348	Warden of the king's scholars, app.1331	Born: about 1262; In 1343, Master John de Langetoft, parson of the church of Herdeby filed a complaint that Robert, son of Simon Hauberk of Scladeford, Germanus (Gervas) son of Simon Hauberk of Scaldeford and others broke his close and houses at Herdeby, assaulted and imprisoned him, and carried away his goods after assaulting his men and servant. Siblings: Robert; Died: 1360
1373	Nicholas			Patron: Thomas Lord Ros Was included in original John Nichols (printer) listing. No further listing available
1468	William Reynolds			Patron: William Lord Hastings Was included in original John Nichols (printer) listing. No further listing available
	John			Was included in original John Nichols (printer) listing. No further listing is available
1526–1536	Robert Carleton	Ordained: 19 February 1502; Vicar of Foulden, Norfolk 3 February 1503 – 1508; Rector of Roos, Yorkshire 2 June 1508 – February 1529; Rector of Wilsthorpe, Lincolnshire 10 May 1513; Rector of Westmill, Hertfordshire 25 July 1518; Rector of Harby, Leicestershire	Gonville Hall College, Cambridge	or Robert Carlton; Born: 1404 perhaps in Norwich There are frequent examples of the sequestration of the fruits of a benefice because the incumbent disobeyed. In 1528 the rectory at Narborough was in ruins, so the incumbent must have been absent, therefore the fruits of the living were sequestered. Twenty-nine of these men were then, as Mrs Bowker puts it "pure pluralists”. It was amongst this group that the desire for financial gain was most blatant. Livings, when combined, could produce a considerable sum. Master Robert Carleton besides being rector of Harby and of Westmill, Herefordshire, which brought him a clear 630 when he had paid his curates, was also rector of Roos in Yorkshire. Died: 1600
1539	++++++++	English Reformation	by Henry VIII	reaches Melton Mowbray and Belvoir Priory
1548-1557	William Leigh	Ordained: Rector by Henry Holbeach Lincoln; Rector Harby, Leicestershire		Also listed as William Leighe
1557-1558	Simon Kellam	Ordained: Rector By Henry Holbeach, Lincoln; Rector of Somerby, Leicestershire 1551; Rector of Harby, Leicestershire; Rector Of Waltham on the Wolds 19 March 1559 – 16 March 1564; Rector of Ropsley, Lincolnshire 6 March 1565 – 30 November 1575		Also listed as Simonis Killam Died: 30 November 1575 Ropsley, Lincolnshire
1558- 1596	Richard Thorpe	Ordained by Nicholas Bullingham at Lincoln 22 September 1565; Rector of Harby, Leicestershire		Also listed as Richardus Thorpe
1570	George Benett			Patron: Henry Manners, 2nd Earl of Rutland
1596–1616	Robert Snoden	Ordained: Deacon and Priest (Lincoln) 21 February 1588/9; Rector of Harby, Leicestershire; Rector of Hickling, Nottinghamshire 1598–1616; Prebendary of Southwell, Nottinghamshire 1599–1616; Chaplain to James I in 1614; Bishop of Carlisle, Cumberland 1616–1621	Sizar at Christ's College, Cambridge; May 1580; BA 1582/3; MA 1586; BD 1593; DD 1598; Fellow, 1589–1599	Also Listed as Robertus Buoden; Born: about 1562; Parent: third son of Ralph Snoden of Mansfield Woodhouse, Nottinghamshire; Siblings: Richard Snoden 1575; Issue: Rutland Snoden 1615; Died: London, 15 May 1621
1601	John Bragg	Ordained by William Chaderton Bishop of Lincoln; Curate Harby, Leicestershire from 13 October 1601		Possible listing mistake with John Bugg listed 1738
1613	John White	Rector of Goadby, Leicestershire 1613-39; Rector of Harby, Leicestershire; Vicar of Norton-by-Galby, King's Norton Leicestershire 1626	Pembroke College, Oxford April 1 606; B.A. January 1610; M.A.	Born: about 1587; Married: Licence (Lincoln) 30 January 1617 (age 30), to marry Katherine Rudd of Stathern, Leicestershire; John Whyte & Catherine Rudd Married on 4 February 1617. Reverend Roger Rudd was Rector of Stathern and father of Catherine; Died: 1639
1613	George Ormerod	Ordained: Deacon Peterborough 20 September 1612; Priest 20 December 1612; Curate of Harby, Leicestershire	Trinity College, Cambridge; BA 1611/2	Born: about 1590; Died:1688
1647 - 1666	Thomas Dalby (Daffy)	Rector of Harby, Leicestershire; Rector of Redmile, Leicestershire 1666-1680		Patron John Manners, 1st Duke of Rutland Is listed as Thomas Dalby by John Nichols. Was this a mistake or a cover-up for the puritanical Duchess of Rutland who in 1666 had Thomas Daffy demoted to the poorer parish of Redmile, Leicestershire? The listing for Thomas Dalby on the Clergy of the Church of England database lists Thomas Dalby as a school teacher at Belton, Lincolnshire while Thomas Daffy is listed only as Rector of Redmile, Leicestershire. More intriguing is that Thomas Daffy is listed as having been ordained by Thomas Fulwar of Ardfert Abbey, County Kerry, Ireland 5 July 1660. Thomas Daffy was the inventor of Daffy's Elixir
1659	William Stevens	Rector of Harby, Leicestershire; Rector of Sutton, Bedfordshire 1666-1672	School: Honnington, Lincolnshire sizar age 17 at Magdalen College, Oxford; B.A. 1653/4; M.A.1657	Born: About 1633; Parent: William Stevens, Gentleman of Barkston, Lincolnshire; Died: about 1721 Buried at Sutton, Bedfordshire; In Oxford information was listed as perhaps and possibly for both Rector positions. Was included in original John Nichols (printer) listing.
1662	Daniel Pepys	Ordained Deacon by Robert Sanderson Bishop of Lincoln 6 April 1660; Priest 10 April 1661; Curate of Harby, Leicestershire; Vicar of Bisbrooke, Leicestershire 1678	Sizar aged 16 at Peterhouse, Cambridge; B.A. 1656-7	Born: about 1632 Norfolk; Parents: Son of Richard Pepys 1602; Siblings: Brother of Samuel 1639-40 (not the diarist Samuel Pepys but both are distant relatives); Married: Elizabeth Todd 27 January 1678 in Bisbrooke, Rutland, England; Died: 1691 aged about 59; Buried at Bisbrooke, Leicestershire
1660–1703	Anthony Harwood	Rector of Barnoldby, Lincolnshire 1642; Rector of Harby, Leicestershire; Rector of Corby, Northamptonshire 1660 Prebendary of Lincoln, Lincolnshire 1660-1703	School: Uppingham, Rutland sizar aged 15 at Sidney Sussex College, Cambridge; B.A. 1634/5; M.A. 1638; Created B.D. at Oxford 1642; Chaplain in the Royal Army 1643	Born: about 1614; Parents: Son of Henry Harwood Gentleman of Uppingham, Rutland; Married: Marriage bond 11 July 1642 to Mary Andrews spinster of Nottingham Charged with popish practices 1644 Died 12 May 1703 aged 89 Monumental Inscription at St John's Corby, Northamptonshire
1638–1698	Richardus Johnson	Instituted by William Laud Archbishop of Canterbury, Kent 5 June 1638; Rector of Harby, Leicestershire; Rector of Sheepy with Ratcliffe Culey, Leicestershire 1639 - 1679		
1680	Edvardus Browne	Ordained: 16 March 1679 Deacon by Thomas Barlow Bishop, Lincoln Priest 6 June 1680 by Thomas Barlow Bishop, Lincoln; Curate of Sysonby Chappel, Leicestershire 1679; Curate of Harby, Leicestershire		
1687	Laur. Howell, (Laurentius)	Ordained: Deacon: 25 September 1687 by Thomas Barlow Bishop, Lincoln; Listed as Preacher (appt. Licensing) Harby, Leicestershire		
1688	Gul Lewis (William)	Ordained: 11 3 1688 by Thomas Barlow Bishop, Lincoln; Listed as Preacher and Curate (appt. Licensing) Harby, Leicestershire		
1692	Robert Peete	Ordained: Deacon 26 May 1689 by Thomas Barlow Bishop of Lincoln; Ordained: Priest 22 May 1692 by Thomas Tenison Bishop of Lincoln; Preacher at Sedgebrook with East Allington, East Allington chapel, Totnes 27 May 1689; Preacher at Harby, Leicestershire		
1701-1703	Johannes Vincent	Ordained: Deacon by James Gardiner Bishop of Lincoln 21 September 1701; Ordained: Priest by James Gardiner Bishop of Lincoln 14 March 1703; Deacon of Harby, Leicestershire; Curate Harby, Leicestershire 15 March 1703; Curate Plungar, Leicestershire 15 March 1703; Vicar of Croxton Kerrial, Leicestershire 28 July 1703 – 15 February 1714; Rector of Barkston, Nottinghamshire 22 April 1713 – 15 October 1713	Emmanuel College, Cambridge BA	Died: 15 February 1714
1703–1739	John Major	Ordained: Deacon York September 1694; Priest July 1696; Chaplain to the Earl of Rutland; Vicar of Croxton Kerrial, Leicestershire, 1702–1703; Rector of Harby, Leicestershire; Rector of Tollerton, Nottinghamshire 1729-38	School: Worksop, Nottinghamshire; Christ's College, Cambridge 11 December 1690 age 19; B.A. 1692/3; M.A. 1729	Patron: John Manners, 1st Duke of Rutland Born: at Whitwell (or Holme) Derbyshire; Parents: Robert Major Husbandman; Married: Mary Trussel of Belvoir, 29 September 1704 at Harby Monument inscription in Parish Church: from John Nichols (printer) In this Chancel, on a flat grey stone, cut round with a deep channel by way of border, is inscribed: "Here Lieth the body of Mrs Mary Major, the wife of Mr John Major, rector of this parish. She departed this life 21st day of May, in the year of our lord 1707." On a blue plain stone adjoining, the following simple, but high encomium: "Here lieth interred the body of Mr John Major, A.M., late rector of this parish who led an exemplary, friendly and hospitable life among his parishioners for 35 years. He died on June 4, 1739, aged 67." Died: Died: 4 June 1739 Buried at Harby Leicestershire Buried: Chancel crypt, Harby, Leicestershire
1738	John Bugg	Ordained by William Chaderton Bishop of Lincoln; Curate Harby, Leicestershire		Possible mistake with John Bragg listed as Curate in 1601
1739–1741	William Turvile	Ordained: Deacon (London) 25 September 1726; Vicar of Claxton, Leicestershire 1729-39 now Long Clawson; Rector of Harby, Leicestershire 1739-40; Chaplain to the Duke of Rutland	Emmanuel College, Cambridge; B.A. 1721/2; M.A. 1725; Incorporated at Oxford University 1737	Patron: Lord William Manners for this time Born: 1 July 1701 Middlesex; Parents: Probable Son of George Turvile of Bromley, Middlesex; Siblings: Probable brother of George Turvile 1713; Died: 21 January 1740 Buried at Long Clawson, Leicestershire
1741–1749	Samuel Kerchevall	Ordained: Deacon Lincoln 9 March 1717; Priest 22 June 1718; Vicar of Little Dalby, Leicestershire 1718-1741; Rector of Cold Overton, Leicestershire 1732-1749; Rector of Harby, Leicestershire	School: School Grantham, Lincolnshire; St John's College, Cambridge; BA 1719	Patron: John Manners, 3rd Duke of Rutland Born: about 1693 - Orstone, Nottinghamshire; Parents: Son of John Kerchevall, Gemtalman; Died: 14 February 1749
1749–1751	Richard Stevens	Ordained: Deacon, Lincoln 22 February 1741; Priest York 6 March 1748; Rector of Weston, Nottinghamshire 1748; Rector of Harby, Leicestershire; Rector of Bottesford Leicestershire 1752-71 Prebendary of Lincoln, Lincolnshire 1767-71	School: Grantham, Lincolnshire; St John's College, Cambridge; B.A. 1739; M.A. 1749	Patron: John Manners, 3rd Duke of Rutland Born: about 1718 Grantham, Lincolnshire; Parents: Son of Thomas Stevens Grocer of Grantham, Lincolnshire; Died: 13 March 1771 aged 53; Buried at Grantham, Lincolnshire
1751	Richard Stoup	Ordained Curate by Frederick Cornwallis Archbishop or Canterbury, Kent; Ordained Priest 2 June 1751 by John Thomas Bishop of Lincoln; Curate of Harby, Leicestershire 3 June 1751 – 14 March 1755; Vicar of Barkestone, Leicestershire 14 March 1755 – 7 July 1788; Rector of Harston, Leicestershire 17 May 1762 – 14 March 1789; Rector of Woolsthorpe with Stainworth, Lincolnshire 7 December 1786 – 30 October 1788; Rector of Knipton, Leicestershire 16 November 1786 – 25 June 1788; Vicar Of Scalford, Leicestershire 19 May 1787 – 19 May 1787	Admission to Lambeth degree 29 May 1775	
1751–1763	William Cant	Ordained: Deacon, Lincoln 20 September 1730; Priest 24 September 1732; Rector of Harby, Leicestershire; Vicar of Somercotes, Lincolnshire	Sizar at Queens' College, Cambridge May 1725; B.A. 1728/9; M.A. 1734	Patron: John Manners, 3rd Duke of Rutland Born: about 1707; Justice of the Peace for Leicestershire issue: John Cant 1740-1781 Rector if Knaptoft Leicestershire and owner of the Wartnaby Estate, Leicestershire; William Cant 1734-1789 Curate of Saxelby, Leicestershire 1734 and Rector of Kirk Langley, Derbyshire 1768-1789
1792–1813	Daniel Wagstaff	1803–1841 Curate (appt. Licensing); Harby, Leicestershire; Eastwell, Leicestershire; Goadby Marwood, Leicestershire; Scalford, Leicestershire	School: Newcastle-on-Tyne School, Northumberland; Lincoln College, Oxford; BA 1791	Born: 1769; Parents: Josiah WAGSTAFF of Middleton-in-Teesdale, Co. Durham; Died: 17 December 1841 aged 74
1763–1804	Bennet Storer	Ordained deacon (Lincoln), 24 September 1749 Ordained priest 2 December 1750; Rector of Harby, Leicestershire; Prebendary of the Cathedral and Metropolitan Church of Christ Canterbury, Kent 1769–1804	School: Grantham, Lincolnshire; Trinity College, Cambridge BA 1748/9 MA 1763	Born: 1726; Parents: Francis Storer Vicar of St Mary Magdalene's Church, Stapleford, Leicestershire Baptised there 21 November 1726; Had the misfortune to kill a man in self-defence while in lodgings at the Swan public house at Westminster Bridge; tried at the Old Bailey, London on 17 January 1777 and honourably acquitted. Died: 9 July 1804 aged 78; Will held at The National Archives (United Kingdom)PROB 11/1404/82
1804–1826	Thomas Norris	Rector of Harby, Leicestershire	Trinity College, Cambridge; BA	Patron: John Manners, 3rd Duke of Rutland Born: 1772; Baptised: 20 March 1772 at St Wulfram's Church, Grantham, Lincolnshire; Married: Sarah Elye Towne on 21 December 1809 Bottesford Church, Leicestershire. Sarah's father was the Reverend Leonard Elye Towne of Utterby, Lincolnshire; Issue: Sarah Eyle Norris 1813, John Eyle Norris 1816, Frances Elizabeth Norris 1819, William Norris 1824; Died: Parish Rectory, Harby, Leicestershire
1826–1852	William Evans Hartopp	Vicar of Thurnby with Stoughton, Leicestershire, 1820- vacant 1832; Rector of Gt Kington, Dorset; 1825–26; Rector of Harby, Leicestershire	School: Sonning Hill, Sonning, Berkshire Trinity College, Cambridge. BA 1817, MA 1831	Born: Old Dalby, Leicestershire. on 30 October 1793 Parents: Edward Hartopp-Wigley; Hon. Juliana Evans 1760 – 20 May 1807 daughter of George Evans, 3rd Baron Carbery; Married: (1st) Eliza Georgiana Gubbins, died 15 February 1848 aged 51 years – daughter of George Stamer Gubbins of Kilfrush, Co. Limerick; Issue: Edward Samuel Evans Hartopp Edward Hartopp (cricketer) 7 September 1820 – 5 October 1894; Married: (2nd) Eliza Manners, daughter of Rev. E. Manners of Goadby Marwood, Leicestershire; Died: 2 October 1852 at Parish Rectory, Harby, Leicestershire
1852–1899	Manners Octavius Norman	Ordained deacon, Peterborough, 1844; Ordained priest, 1845; Rector of Croxton-Kerrial, Leicestershire 1846–1853; Rector of Harby Leicestershire; Rural Dean Framland III Deanery 1872–1885	School: Rugby School Rugby, Warwickshire; Corpus Christi College, Cambridge; BA 1845	Born: Melton Mowbray, Leicestershire 5 March 1818 Parents: Richard Norman 1758–1847; Lady Elizabeth Isabella Manners 1976–1853; Married: Charlotte Elizabeth Ralph, born 1828 Cork, Ireland; Issue: James Richard Norman 1868–1927 The memorial inscription reads: In memory of the Revd. Manners Octavius NORMAN, born March 5. 1818. Died May 28. 1899. 46 years rector of Harby from 1853 to 1899. rural dean, Framland III Deanery, 1872 to 1885. Opera fecit. New schools & house costing £1000. Church & chancel restored costing £1875. Organ £81. Bells re-hung & a new Queen Victoria's Jubilee bell added 1887 costing £166. This tablet was placed here by parishioners and friends. His first text at Harby St Luke 24.44. Died: 28 May 1899 at Parish Rectory, Harby, Leicestershire
1899–1925	Edward Henry Stone	Ordained: Deacon in 1889; Rector of Bottesford 1890 1894; Rector of St Barnabas, Kensington; Rector of Harby, Leicestershire		Born: 1860; Was at sea as a boy. Married: Life bachelor Died: 10 January 1925 at Parish Rectory, Harby, Leicestershire. Buried in Parish Churchyard, Harby, Leicestershire.
1926–1946	Arthur Evelyn Furnival	Rector	Exeter College, Oxford; BA	
1946–1949	William Paul Watkins	Acting curate at St Peter's, Maidstone, Kent; Chaplain to Eastern Command Forces in 1940; Rector of Harby, Leicestershire	Lincoln College, Oxford; BA	He was mentioned in despatches while serving in Africa and Italy Some of the church's achievements during his incumbency at Harby has been the levelling and grassing of the new churchyard, the passing of Harby's target of £300 for the Leicester Diocesan Appeal fund (it stood at £10 when he arrived), and for Harby's 15th-century church— St Mary's, a new window, a credence table, new hymn and prayer books. The church's heating system was repaired.
1949–1959	Alfred Cuthbert Holden	Rector of Oaks-in-Charnwood, Leicestershire; Rector of Harby, Leicestershire,	University of St Andrews, Scotland; MA	
1959–1961	Charles Brian Underwood	Rector of Harby, Leicestershire	University of Leeds; BA	
1961–1963	Joseph Henry Dransfield	Rector of Harby, Leicestershire		Not listed in Crockford's Clerical Directory; Born: 14 March 1893 Heaton Norris, Lancashire; Death: 10 December 1963 Leicester, Leicestershire
1964–1974	Ieuan Delvin Powell	Rector of Harby, Leicestershire	University of Wales BA	
1975–1977	John Sydney Savige	Priest-in-charge; Rector of Harby, Leicestershire; Rural Dean Framland III Deanery 1977 - 1989		Patron: Charles Manners, 10th Duke of Rutland Born: Leicester, Leicestershire, England on 18 Oct 1924 to Thomas Sydney Savige and Margaret Frances Benner. Married: Freda Amy Lacey. Died: 7 Jul 1997 in Eastbourne, Sussex, England.
1990–1994	Simon Bailey	Ordained Deacon 1983 (Ripon) and Priest 1984 (Ripon); Team Rector (Harby, Hose and Long Clawson)	MusB Hons., Manchester University; PGCE, Cambridge University; BCombStuds., Nottingham University (Lincoln Theological College)	Patron: Charles Manners, 10th Duke of Rutland (Harby). Born: 1956 in West Dorset. Married: Jane Elizabeth Lees 1985. Issue: Rebecca and Sarah (born in Melton Mowbray). Played cricket for Belvoir CC and Lincs Gents; Country member at Nottinghamshire County CC. Formed the Vale Choir with Colin Newel. With parishioners, founded the Fellowship Lunches that ran for many years in all three villages. More often than not, rode his bicycle between the three village churches. After an incumbency in Woodhall, Pudsey, in the Diocese of Bradford, the family migrated to Australia in 2003.
1994–1998	Mark Turner	Curate of Harby Leicestershire	Sarum and Wells Theological College, Salisbury	
1994–1998	Geoffrey Spencer	Priest-in-charge	Nottingham University, Nottingham	
1997–1999	David Francis Mills	Curate of Harby, Leicestershire	Oak Hill Theological College, London	
2000	+++	+++++	+++++	Formal Team of churches [Long Clawson, Hose, Harby, Stathern Plunger and Bottesford] officially came into effect
1999–2008	Robin Duncan Stapleford	Ordained at Leicester Cathedral in 1996; Curate of Evington Leicester; Team Rector based at Harby	St John's College, Nottingham	moved back to Norfolk now Rector with Diocese of Norwich; Charles Anthony Bradshaw as Rural dean at Bottesford
2002–2005	Stephen Patrick James Burnham	Curate	Christ Church, Oxford	
2005–2009	Stuart Jack Foster	Priest-in-charge	Oak Hill Theological College	
2009-2017	Frederick Philip Richard John Connell	Team Vicar	St John's College, Nottingham	
2017-2021	James (Jamie) Hugh Mackay	Priest in Charge (Rector Designate)		From 23 March 2017
2021	++++++	Conventional District of Harby Formation	++++++	The Conventional District of Harby was created in 2021 (its boundary to be contiguous with the Ecclesiastical Parish of Harby) to remove Harby (temporarily) from the Benefice of 6 parishes created in 2000 and to allow an independent incumbent to hold office within the District. It is intended that the role will develop new missional and ministry initiatives.
2021 - onwards	Paul Robert Towns	Ordained Deacon, 2 July 2017, by Martyn Snow Bishop of Leicester in Leicester Cathedral Ordained Priest 30 June 2018 by Martyn Snow Bishop of Leicester in Leicester Cathedral Family Chaplain to His Grace the Duke of Rutland 2014 to 2017 Curate - Asfordby with Ab Kettleby and Holwell, Shoby with Saxelbye, Grimston and Wartnaby. 2017 to 2021 Minister in Charge of the Conventional District of Harby, Leicestershire from 5 August 2021 2024 onwards appointed Chaplain to the Worshipful Company of Saddlers - Permission to officiate granted by the Bishop of London to act as Chaplain to the Worshipful Company of Saddlers, in the City of London.	Colchester Royal Grammar School Seale Hayne College (Plymouth University) 1993 B.Sc. (Hons) Agriculture Nottingham University - 2004 MA. Theology Westcott House Theological College, Cambridge 2015-2017 Cambridge University 2017 P.G. Dip. Theology	Patron: David Manners, 11th Duke of Rutland Born: Myland, Colchester, Essex Married: Helen Elizabeth (Cottle) 1997; Issue: Montgomery, Emily and Harriet Resident at Harby Hall (adjacent to Parish Church) where Paul keeps horses and sheep on the land surrounding the Church

== Harby Harlequins ==
Harby Harlequins in the village pantomime group, whom since 1999 have put on a performance in the first week of February. These performances would partake in the Village Hall, the same place as the group would rehearse. These performances would have a rough famous story (such as sleeping beauty), but then would be adjusted to fit the village’s humour, such as poking fun at neighbouring villages such as Hose or Plungar.

== Old Folk Stories ==
According the local people, there were stories of back in 1647, there was a village giant cyclops called ’Marcus’. Marcus was known as a strider and had 2 sons that he was very dissatisfied with. As a result of this, Marcus would wreak havoc in the streets unless the old famous chant was called:

‘’ Joel You look like a mole, Why you have a Coal Pole? Why you got a bowl with a hole? You have no soul, Why are you eating my pizza rolls. ‘’

His son was named Joel, and was the once who created the chant. The chant only worked if 10 sung it at the same time. This story was one of the original mention of ‘pizza rolls.

== Notable people ==
- Samuel Levis, born in Harby on 30 September 1649, son of Christopher Levis, was married on 4 May 1680 to Elizabeth Claytor. He received a Quaker certificate of removal in July 1684 and arrived in Pennsylvania by 4 November 1684. Levis died between 4 October 1728 (the date of his will) and 13 April 1734 (date of probate).
- Harby farm labourer Kemp, born in 1884, was recorded in 1956 by the University of Leeds, talking about sheep shearing, washing, dipping and the price of a fleece.

== Amenities ==
Harby has a post office, a village shop and a cafe, all located at the village garage in Nether Street. The nearest centre for trade, medical services and other amenities is Melton Mowbray.

== War memorial ==
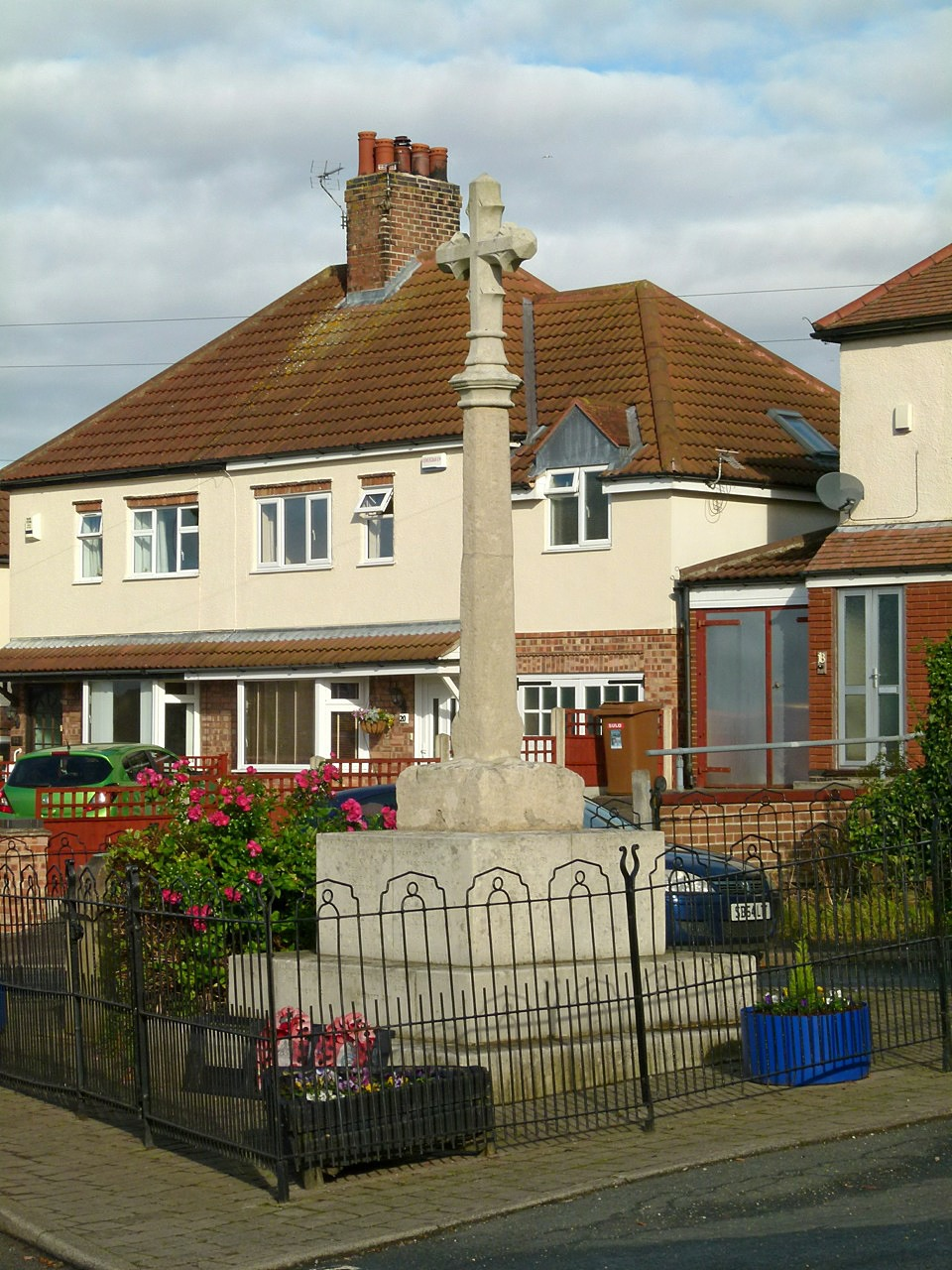
War memorial, Harby

The war memorial cross was erected in honour of the Harby soldiers and sailors who participated in the First World War.

The accepted plans were drawn up by Mr T. Burbidge and the work was entrusted to Mr S. Squires of Bingham.
The height is nearly 15 ft, the lower of the two bases being 8 ft square. The stone above is 4 ft square and 2 ft in height, containing 99 names, 19 on the front face being those who were killed in action or died on service. The remaining 80 are those who enlisted from the village and survived.

Surrounding this stone is an old shaft and base from an ancient village cross, capped with a new cross suggesting what the original may have looked like, drawn by a former rector, Rev. Manners Octavius Norman. The whole, old and new, is of Portland stone. This relic of the old village cross stood originally on the village green, some yards from its present position. It was moved to the churchyard when the school was built in 1860. The arrow marks where the new cross was fitted to the old. The steel brace which joins the two parts together was made by Mr. Martin Stead, the village blacksmith."

The unveiling ceremony on the night of Thursday, 20 May 1920, was performed by the Rev. E. H. Stone, Rector, in the presence of 200 people and of the church and chapel choirs. Sixty ex-servicemen formed a guard of honour. The text runs:

ERECTED BY THE PARISHIONERS IN MEMORY OF THOSE WHO FOUGHT IN THE GREAT WAR 1914 – 1919.

OFFERED UPON THE ALTAR OF THE NATION

Name	Regiment	Date killed in action	Age	Commemorated / buried	Notes
John William Hoyes	Leicestershire Yeomanry	13 May 1915	26	Panel 5 of the Ypres Menin Gate Memorial	Francis Arther Hoyes
Frederick Walter Mabbot	Leicestershire Yeomanry	13 May 1915	28	Panel 5 of the Ypres Menin Gate Memorial	Born: 1886 Harby, Leicestershire; Family Home: Burden Lane, Harby, Leicestershire
John Edgar Dewey	Northamptonshire Regiment	3 October 1915	24	Laos Memoria	Born: 1890 Harby, Leicestershire; Family Home: near The Post Office, Harby, Leicestershire
George Henry Moulds	Leicestershire Regiment	28 January 1916	25	Buried in XII.J.6 of the Amara War Cemetery	Born: Harby, Leicestershire; Family Home: Stathern Lane, Harby, Leicestershire Awarded Distinguished Conduct Medal
Albert Edward Moulds	Rifle Brigade	14 April 1916	23	Panel 46-48 & 50 of the Ypres (Menin Gate) Memorial	Born: 1893 Harby, Leicestershire; Family Home: 21 Stoney Street, Beeston, Nottinghamshire
Herbert Hand		30 July 1916		Panel 69 to 73 of the Loos Memorial	
Lesley Woodford	Royal Sussex Regiment	21 September 1916	23	1.1.4 Sucrerie Military Cemetery Colincamps	Born: 1893 Harby, Leicestershire; 13 Exchange Row, Harby, Leicestershire
William Wright	Leicestershire Regiment	25 September 1916	21	Pier and Face 2C. & 3A. Thiepval Memorial	Born: 1895 Hose, Leicestershire; Faily Home: Colston Lane, Harby, Leicestershire
Tom Rawlings	Royal Sussex Regiment	17 October 1916	32	Pier and Face 7.C Thiepval Memorial	Born: 1884 Harby, Leicestershire; Family Home: Sandy Lane, Harby, Leicestershire
Frank Williamson Wesson	Leicestershire Regiment	20 April 1917	36	IV.B.56, Longuenesse St Omer Souvenir Cemetery	Born: 1881 Harby, Leicestershire; Family Home: Burden Lane, Harby, Leicestershire
Jackson Smith		20 September 1917		7-17-23-25-27-29 31, Ypres Menin Gate Memorial	
James Henry Hall	Queen's Own Royal West Kent Regiment	26 October 1917	23	Hooge Crater Cemetery	Born: 1894 Harby, Leicestershire; Family Home: The Mill, Colston Lane, Harby, Leicestershire
Thomas Bernard Goodson	Nottinghamshire & Derbyshire Regiment (Sherwood Foresters)	5 November 1917	19	Panel 99 to 102 & 162 to 162A, Tyne Cot Memorial	Born: 16 August 1898 Stathern, Leicestershire; Family Home: Waltham Road, Harby, Leicestershire
Edward Cooke		6 December 1917		Panel B, Cambrai Memorial, Louvervai	
Thomas Alfred Kemp	Nottinghamshire & Derbyshire Regiment (Sherwood Foresters)	23 March 1918	19	Bay 7 Arras Memorial	Born: 2 February 1899 Harby, Leicestershire; Family Home: 9 Exchange Row, Harby, Leicestershire
Francis Arther Hoyes	North Staffordshire Regiment	6 June 1918	24	Soissons Memorial	Born: 1894 Harby, Leicestershire; Brother of John William Hoyes
Thomas Leonard Stevens		1 October 1918		A.14, Switch British Cemetery, Tjlloy-Les-Cambrai	
Harold W Moulds		1 October 1918		B.5, Conde-sur-l'Escaut Communal Cemetery	
John Thomas Bailey	Royal Garrison Artillery; Section - 76th Siege Battery	7 October 1918	31	I.C.8 Noyelles-sur-L'Escaut Communal Cemetery Extension	Born: 4 October 1887 Long Clawson, Leicestershire; Family Home: Harby, Leicestershire
William Hatton Greaves		3 November 1918		2130 Melton Mowbray, Thorpe Road Cemetery	
Robert Archibald Stokes	Durham Light Infantry	17 January 1919	19	St Mary's Parish Churchyard, Harby, Leicestershire	Born: 7 June 1899 Harby, Leicestershire; Family Home: Stathern Road, Harby, Leicestershire; Was held captive as a prisoner of war in Germany

After the 1939–1945 war, two names of men who did not return were carved on the base.

AND IN MEMORY OF THOSE WHO DIED IN THE 2ND WORLD WAR 1939 – 1945

Name	Regiment	Date killed in action	Age	Commemorated / Buried	Notes
Akerman Charlie Dewey	Middlesex Regiment	18 October 1943	20	plot XIV. A. 37. Sangro River War Cemetery	Born: 1923 Harby Leicestershire
John William Mabbott (Jack)	Royal West Kent Regiment	25 October 1944	33	plot I, F, 13.Santerno Valley War Cemetery	Born: 1911 Harby Leicestershire

== Public houses ==
Originally there were three:

- The Marquis of Granby stood opposite the junction of Boyers Orchard in Stathern Lane, as one of many named after John Manners, Marquess of Granby. Now a private house, it ceased trading some time between 1871 and 1881.
- The White Hart on Main Street traded opposite the Nags Head, both being managed by Home Breweries and of Nottingham. It Was Closed in 2008 and was demolished in 2010-2011. The land is now occupied by 5 houses. During the White Harts final years it operated as a Chinese restaurant and takeaway.
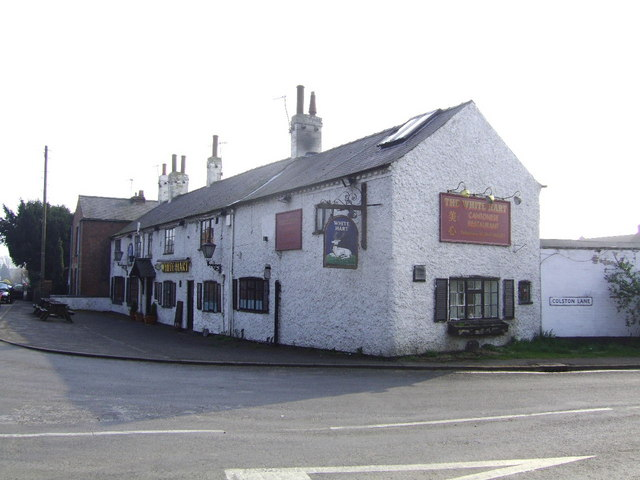
  White Hart, Harby
- The Nags Head, as the survivor, is one of the oldest buildings in the village and reputedly one of the oldest pubs in Leicestershire. It may once have been a priest house: evidence of a priest hole can be seen in one of the upper rooms. It forms one of the best examples of early timber-frame construction in the area.
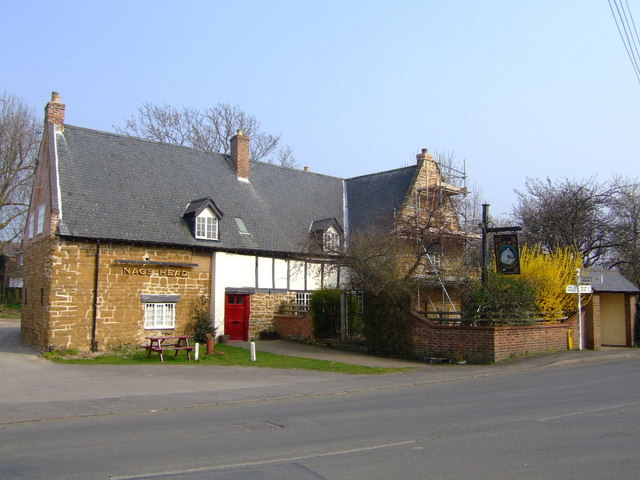
  Nags Head, Harby

== Transport ==
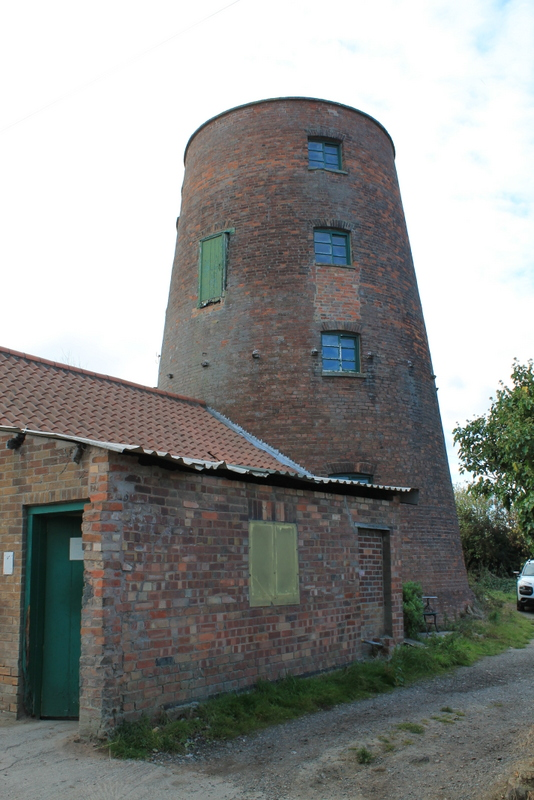
Remains of the Harby tower mill

Harby is almost equidistant at 7 miles (11 km) from the A46 between Leicester and Newark-on-Trent and the A52 trunk road between Nottingham and Grantham. It is just over 5 miles (8.0 km) from the main A607 between Leicester and Grantham. London is 126 miles (203 km) via the M1 motorway.

The village is served by the No. 24 bus between Melton Mowbray and Bottesford or Bingham.

Harby and Stathern railway station opened in 1879 and closed in 1962.

The wharf of Grantham Canal was formerly used to ship grain from the village windmill in Colston Lane, but is now closed.
