= John Avery (organ builder) =

English organ builder (c.1738–1808)

John Avery (c. 1738–1808) was one of the main organ builders in England during the late 18th and early 19th centuries.

== Life ==
Avery was mainly based in London. He had a reputation as a colourful character, occasionally falling foul of the law, being declared bankrupt in 1775 and again in 1801, and having a reputation as a 'shocking drunken character'. Despite this he was responsible for some important organs, including those in King's College, Cambridge and Winchester Cathedral.

He appeared at the Old Bailey as a witness in two trials in 1797:

- on 12 July 1797 in the trial of Henry Gray, who was accused of stealing a handkerchief from Avery's pocket.
- on 20 September 1797 in the trial of Joseph Robson, who was accused of stealing Avery's tools.

One of his apprentices, Alexander Buckingham, went on to work with Thomas Elliot before becoming an independent organ builder.

He died in Giltspur Street Compter.

== Organs ==
Little work by Avery survives, but there is an organ at Ponsonby Baptist Church, New Zealand, and one in the Finchcocks collection at Goudhurst, Kent.

New organs built by Avery include:

- Ditton Parish Church, Kent 1774
- St Stephen's Church, Coleman Street, London 1775
- St Michael's Mount, Cornwall 1786 (originally constructed for John Lemon, MP for Truro)
- Sevenoaks Parish Church 1788
- Quebec Chapel, Westminster 1788
- Coggeshall Parish Church, Essex 1790
- St Mary’s Church, Black Torrington 1791
- All Saints Church, Kingston upon Thames 1793
- Croydon Parish Church 1794
- Lambeth Asylum 1797
- Stroud Parish Church 1798
- Winchester Cathedral 1799
- Christ Church, Bath 1800
- King's College, Cambridge 1803
- St Margaret's Church, Westminster 1804
- Carlisle Cathedral 1806
