= Thomas Elliot (organ builder) =

Thomas Elliot (c. 1759 – 1832) was one of the main organ builders in England during the early 19th century.

== History ==
The first records of Thomas Elliot as an organ builder date from 1790 when he was established in Holborn. Later he moved to premises on the Tottenham Court Road. He is thought to have worked for the company founded by John Snetzler.

He is thought to have formed a partnership with John Nutt, until Nutt's death in 1804.

Alexander Buckingham was foreman to Thomas Elliot for many years until establishing himself as an independent organ builder.

William Hill (1789–1870) married Thomas Elliot's daughter Mary, and then joined the firm, which was renamed Elliot and Hill from 1825 until 1832.

Thomas Elliot died in 1832, and the business continued with William Hill, being known as William Hill & Sons.

== Organs constructed ==
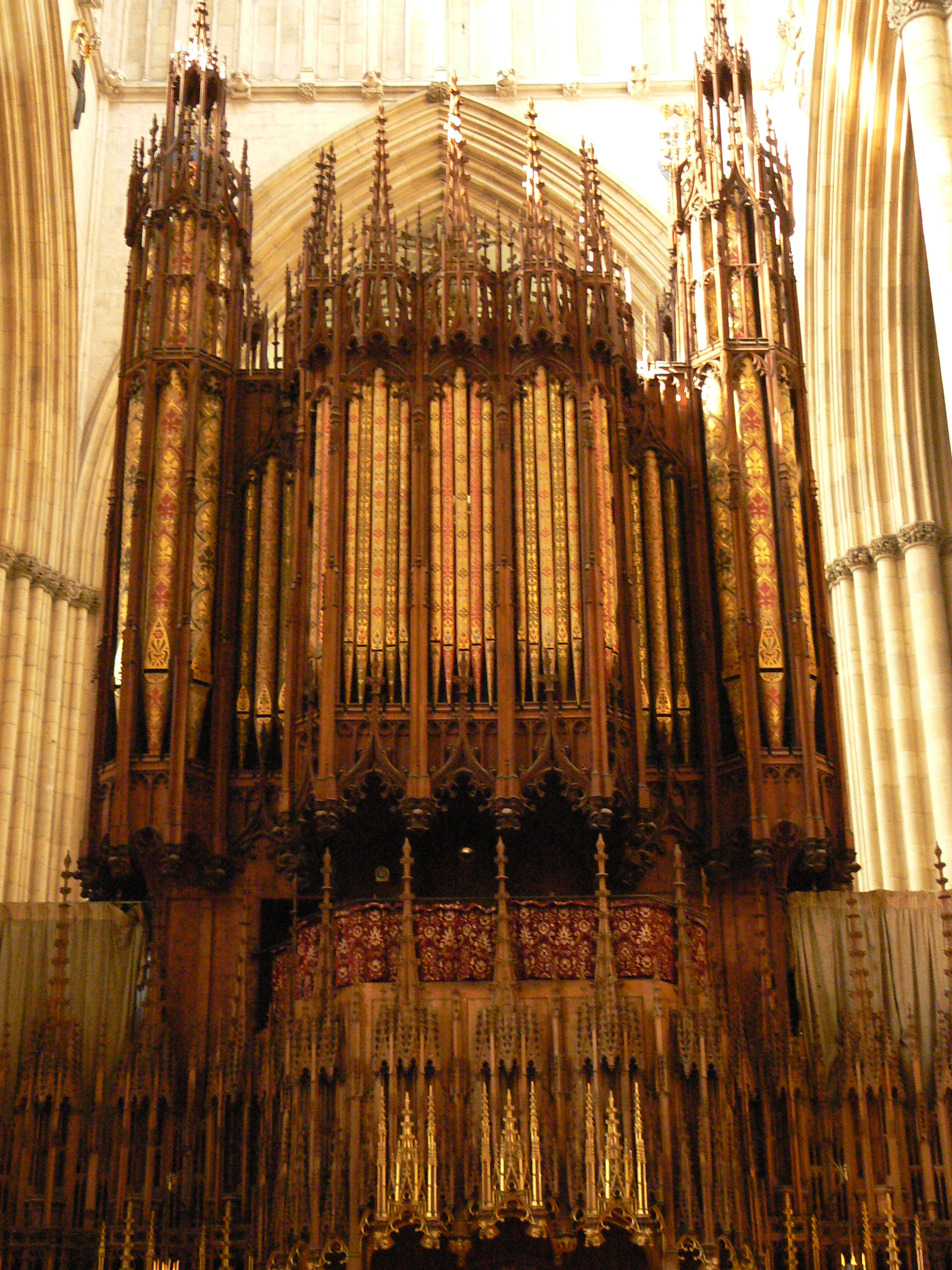
The case of the 1832 organ in York Minster

- Church of St John the Baptist, Bromsgrove, 1809
- All Saints' Church, Thornage, Norfolk, 1812
- High Pavement Chapel, Nottingham, 1815
- St. James' Church, Standard Hill, Nottingham, 1815
- Christ Church Cathedral, Waterford, 1817
- St Michael's Church, Broome, Norfolk, 1817
- St Cassian's Church, Chaddesley Corbett, Worcestershire, 1817
- St Michael Wood Street, 1818
- Westminster Abbey Organ (for Coronation of King George IV at Westminster Abbey, London, 1821)
- Old South Church (Third Church), Boston, Massachusetts, 1822
- St Mary's Church, Wirksworth, 1826
- St John The Baptist, Wolverley, 1830 (As "Elliot and Hill")
- York Minster, 1832
- Church of St Thomas the Martyr, Newcastle upon Tyne, 1832
- St Mary's Parish Church, Harby, Leicestershire. Built for Gedling Parish church, 1808 and installed by Alexander Buckingham. Transferred to Harby, Leicestershire, in 1874.
