= Clawson, Hose and Harby =

Civil parish in Leicestershire, England

Coordinates: 52.858°N 0.915°W

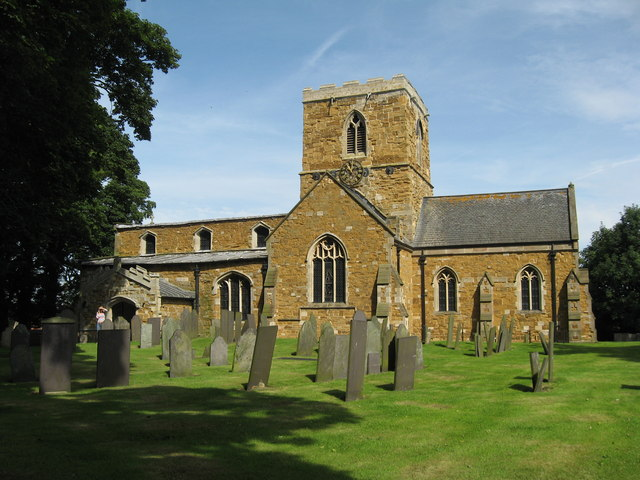
- St Remigius Church, Long Clawson

- Location within Leicestershire
- Population: 2,577 (2011 census)
- Civil parish: Clawson, Hose and Harby
- District: Melton
- Shire county: Leicestershire
- Region: East Midlands
- Country: England
- Sovereign state: United Kingdom
- Police: Leicestershire
- Fire: Leicestershire
- Ambulance: East Midlands

Clawson, Hose and Harby is a civil parish in Leicestershire, England, forming part of the Melton district. It contains the villages of Harby, Hose and Long Clawson and the parish was created from those former parishes on 1 April 1936 (originally named as just "Clawson and Harby"). The population of the civil parish at the 2011 census was 2,577.
