= Long Clawson =

Village in Leicestershire, England

Coordinates: 52°50.334′N 0°55.422′W

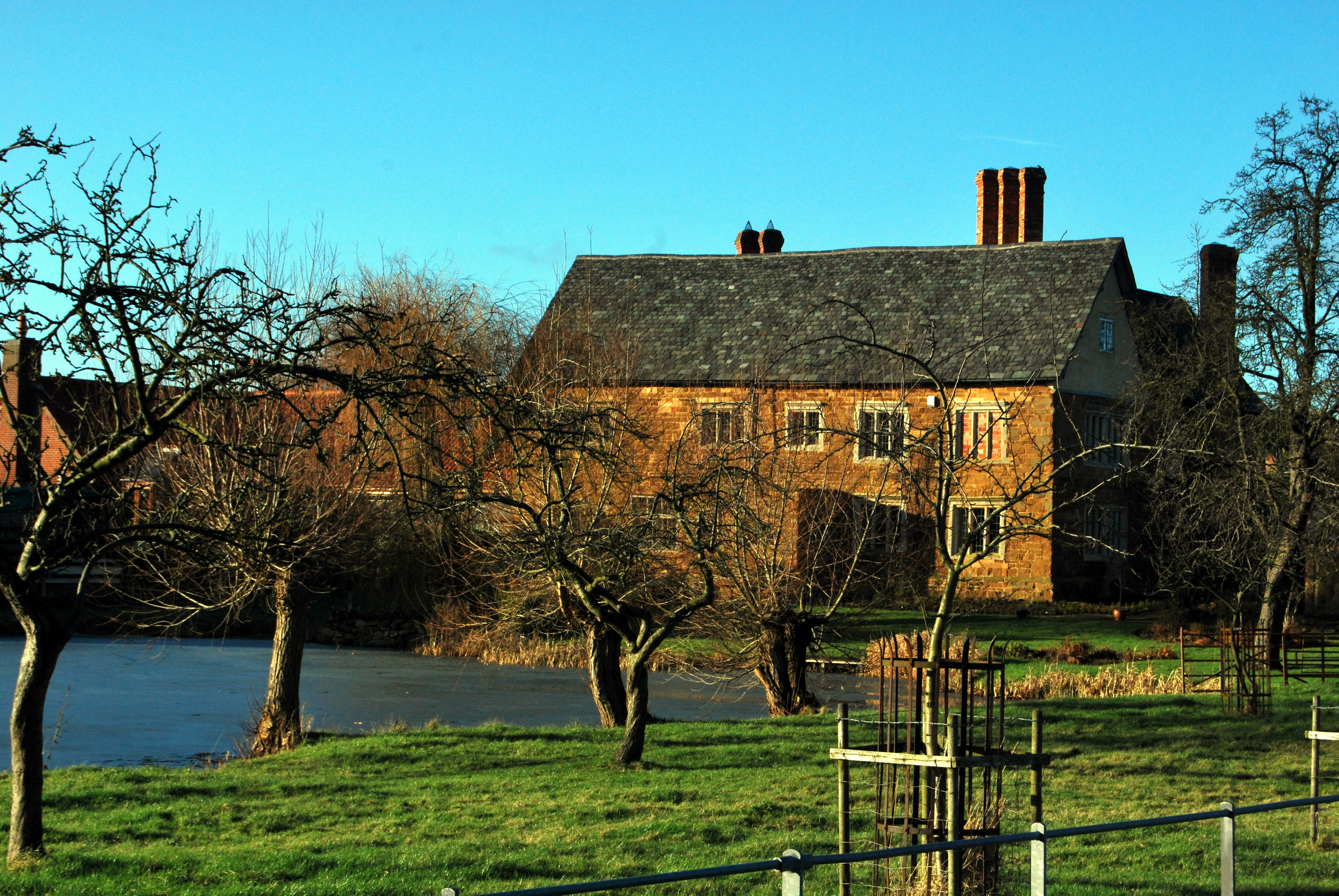
- Long Clawson Manor House

- Location within Leicestershire
- Civil parish: Clawson, Hose and Harby
- District: Melton
- Shire county: Leicestershire
- Region: East Midlands
- Country: England
- Sovereign state: United Kingdom
- Post town: MELTON MOWBRAY
- Postcode district: LE14
- Police: Leicestershire
- Fire: Leicestershire
- Ambulance: East Midlands
- UK Parliament: Melton and Syston

Long Clawson is a village and former civil parish, now included in that of Clawson, Hose and Harby, in the Melton district and the county of Leicestershire, England. Being in the Vale of Belvoir, the village is enclosed by farmland with rich soil ideal for pasture. Milk from local farms is used for Stilton cheese, of which the Long Clawson dairy is one of the largest producers. In 1931 the civil parish had a population of 664.

== Origin of the name ==
There is some debate about the village name; one theory is that there were two villages named Clawson and Claxton that grew into one. The "Long" in the name may have arisen from it being over 1 mile (1.6 km) in length, although the main road through the village has 14 sharp bends.

== History ==
The village features in the 1086 Domesday Book as Clachestone, but there is evidence of much earlier settlement. Embedded in a tarmac footpath against the wall of the Manor House is an ancient megalith, the Long Clawson Stone. It is about 3 ft (91 cm) long and thought to be a fragment of a larger stone. The Manor House itself has an ancient fish pond that is still stocked. On 1 April 1936 the parish was merged with Harby and Hose to form "Clawson and Harby" (now "Clawson, Hose and Harby").

As in many villages, the number of businesses has declined in recent years. It once had five pubs, numerous stores and traders and its own police presence, but now has one pub, the Crown and Plough, and a few shops. The community is strong and thriving with a growing population. Some 100 new houses were built in the early part of the 21st century and the primary school has doubled its pupil number.

A traditional saying about Long Clawson and Hose claims "there are more whores in Hose than honest women in Long Clawson"; this also puns on items of clothing.

== Religion ==
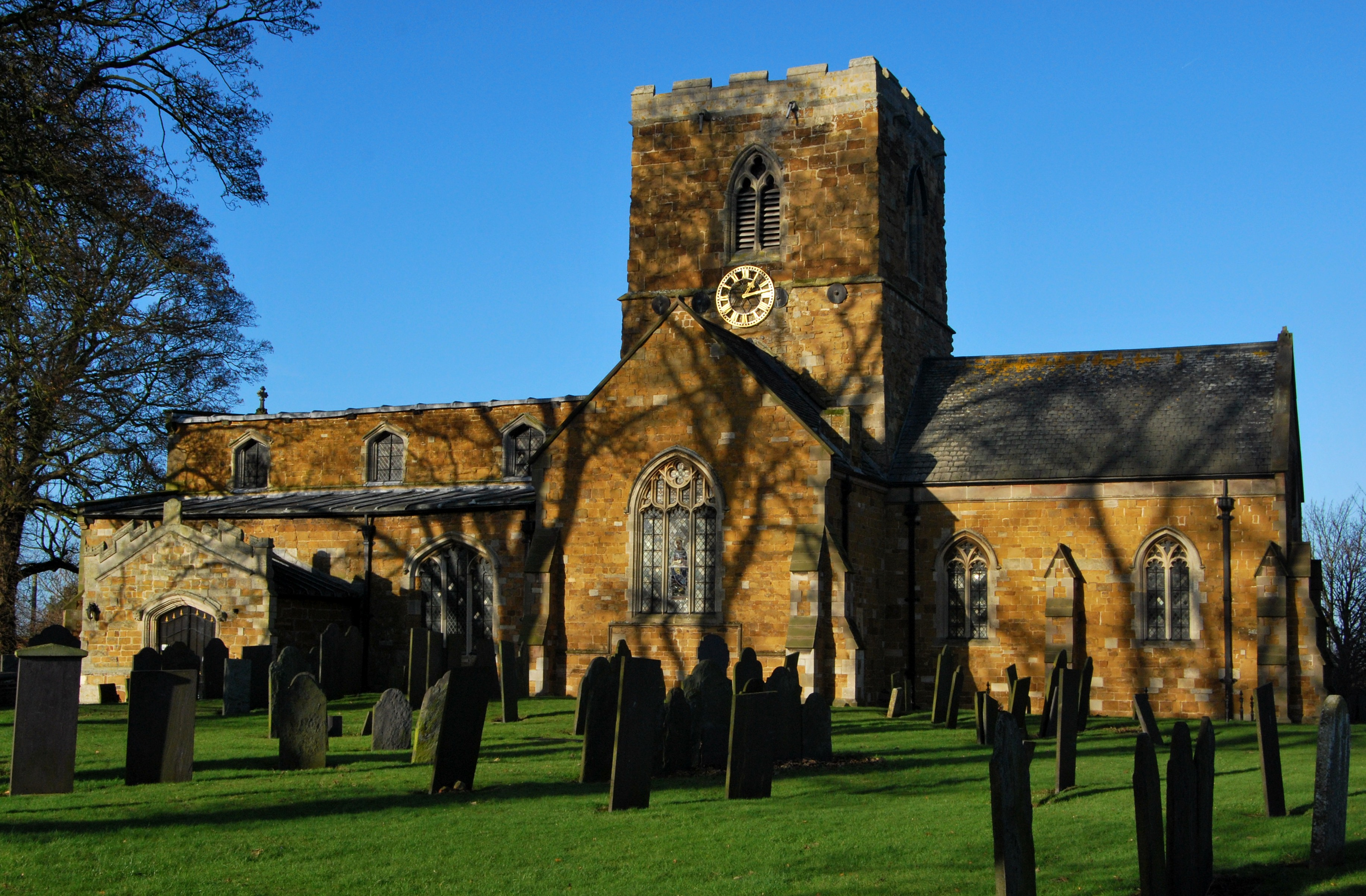
Church of St Remigius

The places of worship are the Anglican church of St Remigius, a Methodist church, and a Baptist church dating from 1845. The last two congregations now meet in 20th-century red brick buildings. The former Primitive Methodist chapel of 1868 has become a private residence.

The parish church of St Remigius dates from about the 14th century. Its walls, like those of the nearby manor house, are made of a rich red local stone. It contains a medieval effigy of the crusader William Bozon. The church was restored in 1893 and seats 300.

The present Methodist Church opened in 1956, a previous chapel dating from the early 19th century was destroyed by fire in 1954.

== Long Clawson Dairy ==
One of only six in England where Stilton cheese is manufactured, Long Clawson Dairy was founded in 1911 by a dozen farmers from the Vale of Belvoir. The firm has prospered and is supplied today by over 40 farms, all within Leicestershire, Nottinghamshire or Derbyshire, as the Protected Designation of Origin for Stilton requires.

The supplier farms range in production between 350,000 and over 4 million litres of milk per year. The dairy employs about 200 to make an annual 6,700 tonnes of cheese in 60 varieties. Exports account for about 20 per cent of its sales, which came to some £54 million in 2008. The firm now makes about 65 per cent of the 9000 tonnes of Stilton cheese sold.

The dairy continues to win several independent trophies and awards each year.

== Other landmarks ==
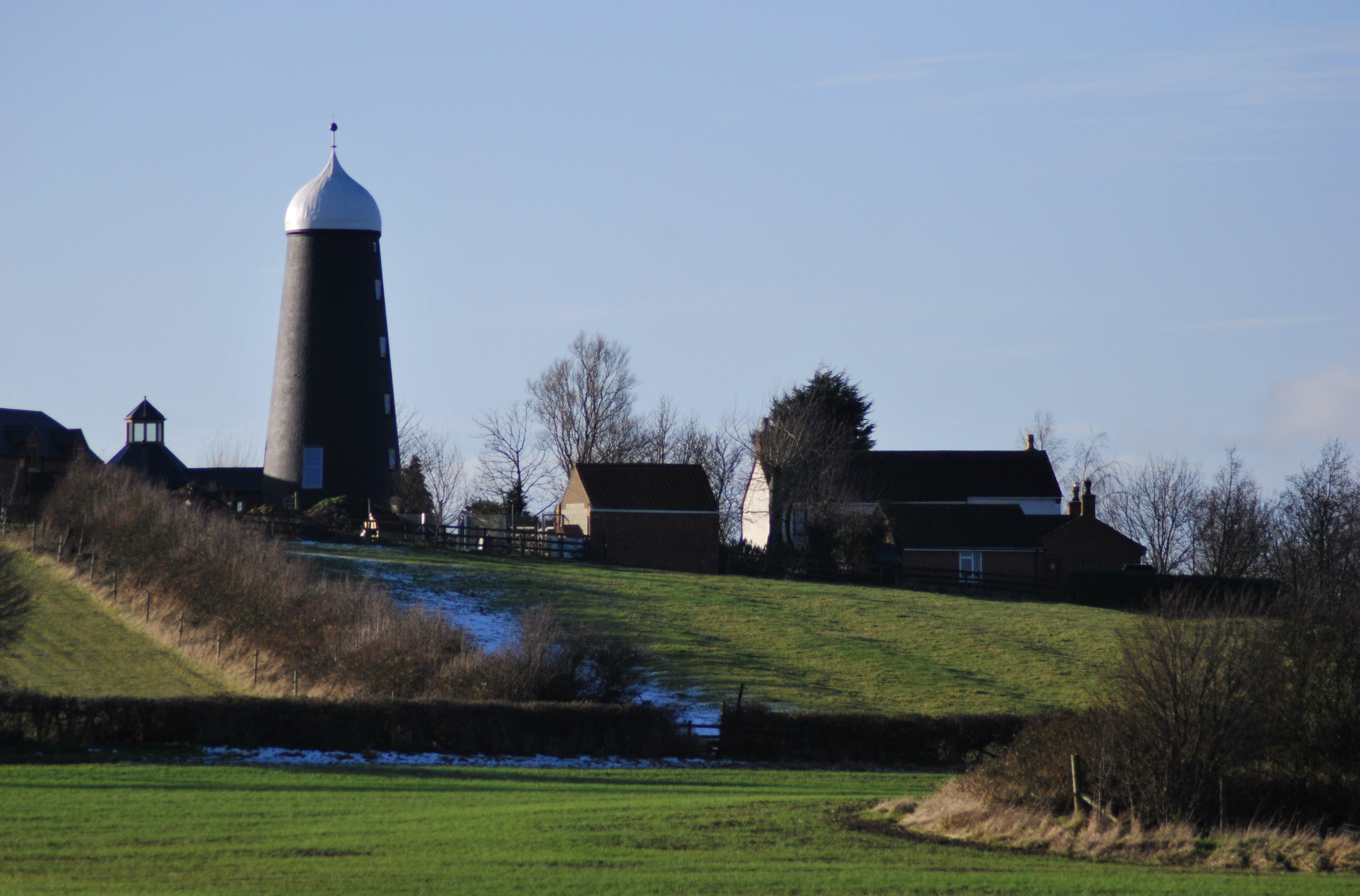
Long Clawson Windmill

The village has a recently restored windmill conspicuous on the skyline from the south. The mill, located at Mill Farm, has a typically Lincolnshire-style cap (white painted ogee-shaped) and counts as a Grade II listed building.
