= Hose, Leicestershire =

Village in Leicestershire, England

Coordinates: 52.85617°N 0.90839°W

Hose
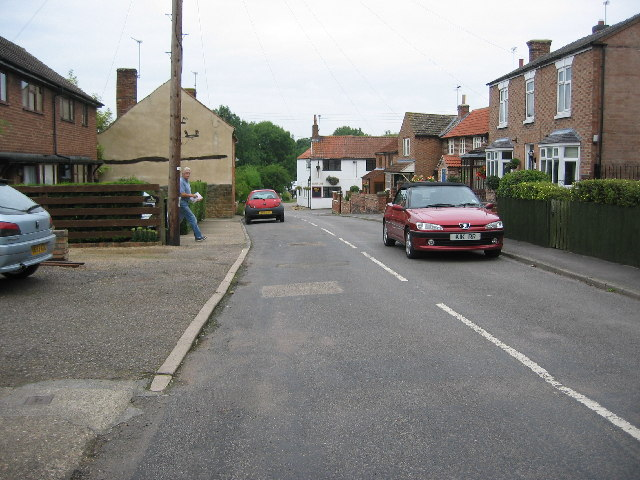
- Middle Street

- Location within Leicestershire
- Population: 580 (2011 Census)
- Civil parish: Clawson, Hose and Harby
- District: Melton
- Shire county: Leicestershire
- Region: East Midlands
- Country: England
- Sovereign state: United Kingdom
- Post town: MELTON MOWBRAY
- Postcode district: LE14
- Police: Leicestershire
- Fire: Leicestershire
- Ambulance: East Midlands
- UK Parliament: Melton and Syston

Hose is a village in the civil parish of Clawson, Hose and Harby, in the Borough of Melton and the county of Leicestershire, England. The town of Melton Mowbray is six miles (10 km) to the south. In 2011 the built-up area had a population of 580.

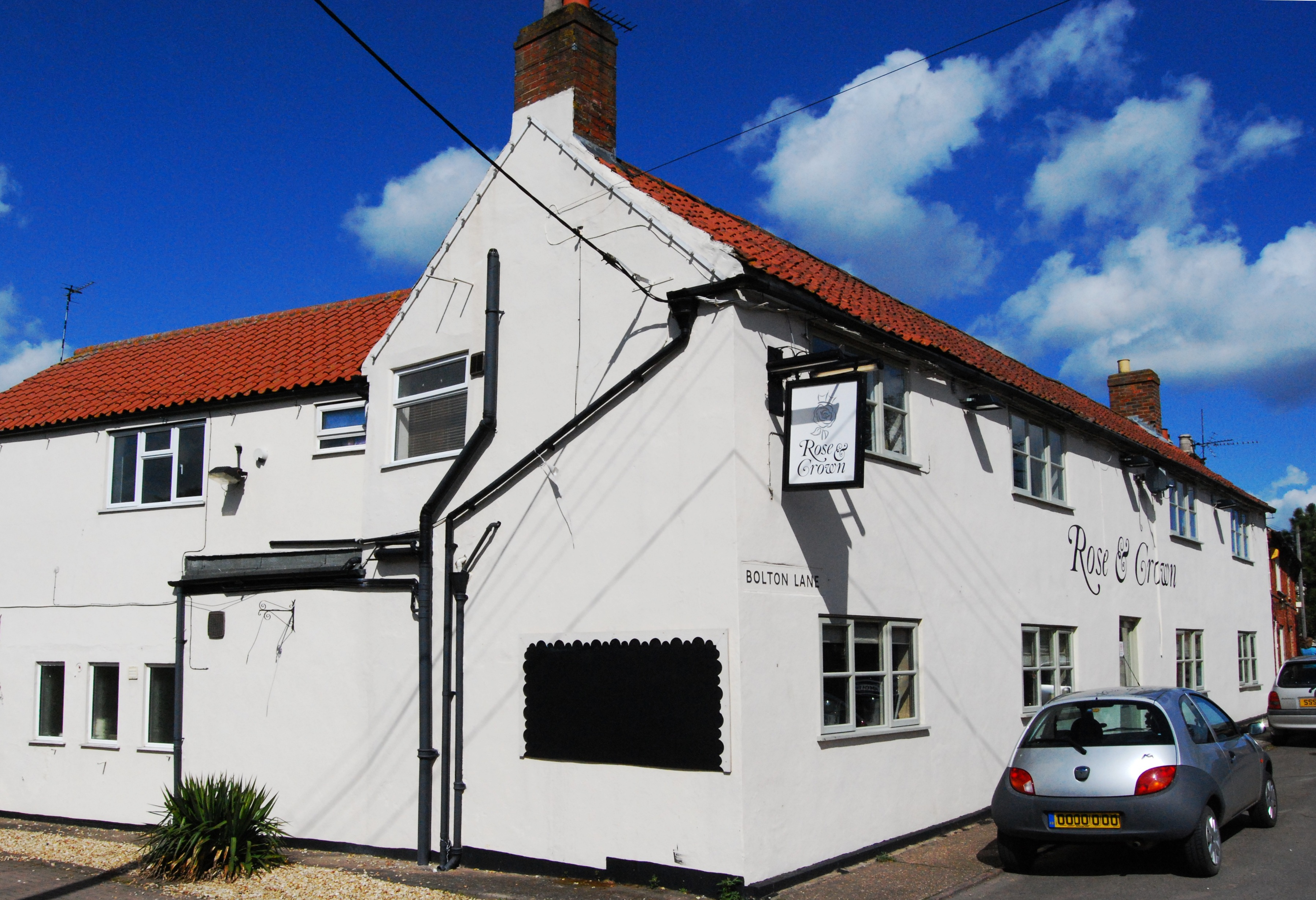
Rose and Crown, Hose

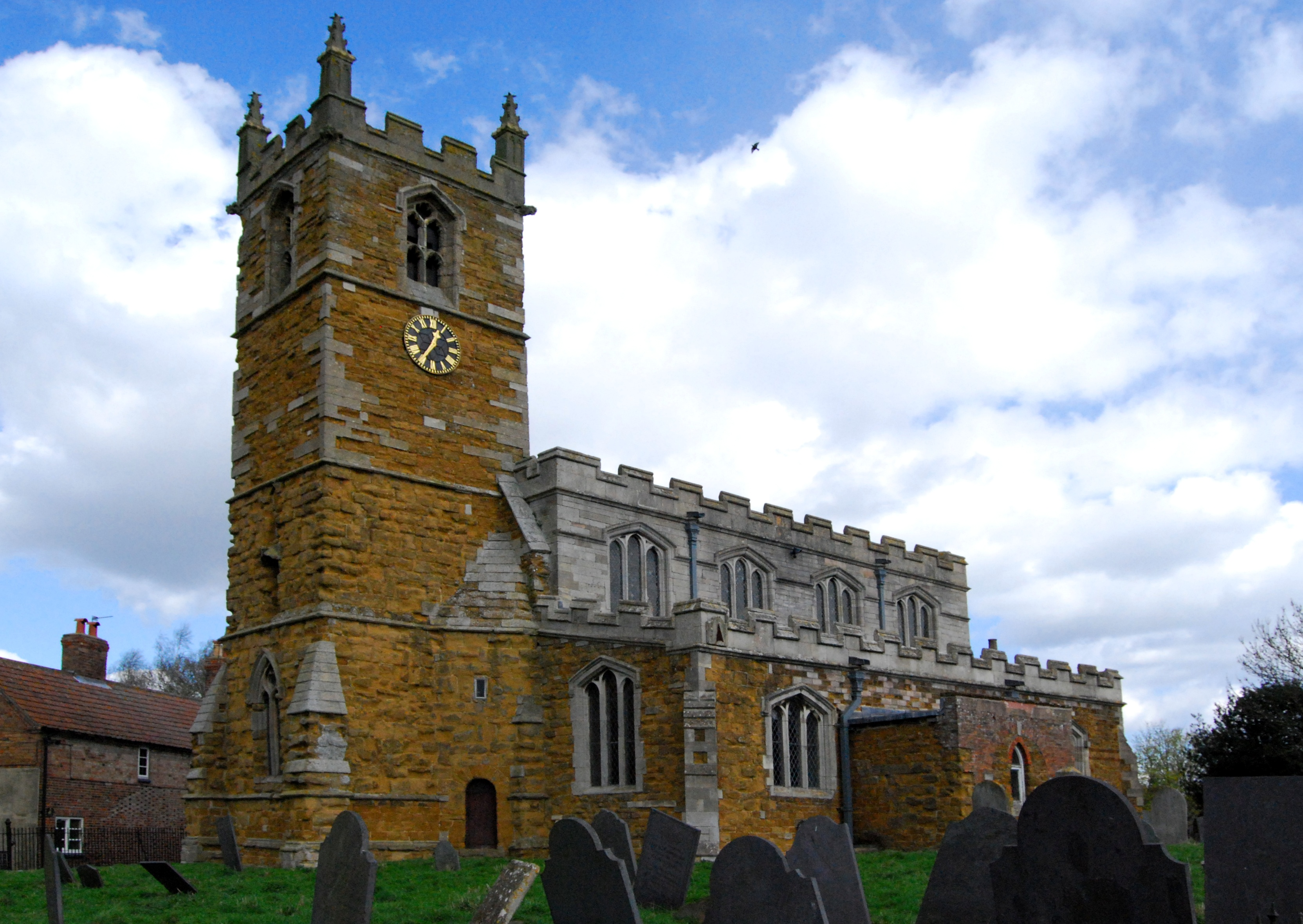
St Michael and All Angels Church, Hose

== Location and amenities ==
In 1931 the civil parish had a population of 421. Hose was merged with Harby and Long Clawson on 1 April 1936. It lies in the north-east of the county, in the Vale of Belvoir, close to the route of the defunct Grantham Canal, which has been designated a Site of Special Scientific Interest and underwent a campaign of environmental dredging and planting in 2014.

The weekday bus service No. 24, between Melton and Bottesford and Bingham runs through the village. All three termini have railway stations.

The village has a medieval Anglican church, a Baptist chapel, a shop and sub-post office, a village hall with playing fields, and a public house, the Rose and Crown. The village green is known as the Park, and includes the premises of a blacksmith.

== Toponymy ==
The village's name derives from the Old English word meaning 'the hill spurs'.

== Origins ==
A group of Bronze Age burial mounds of about 1500 BC have been identified a mile to the south of the parish boundary. Signs of more extensive occupation date from the Roman period of the 1st–4th centuries AD. The village probably existed from the late Saxon period. Hose was cited as "Hoches" and "Howes" in the Domesday Book of 1086.

== Notable People ==
Robert Hoe (machinist) Inventor and printing press manufacturer. Born at Hose, 1784.

== See also ==
- Long Clawson and Hose railway station
