= Gedling Country Park =

Country park in Nottinghamshire, England

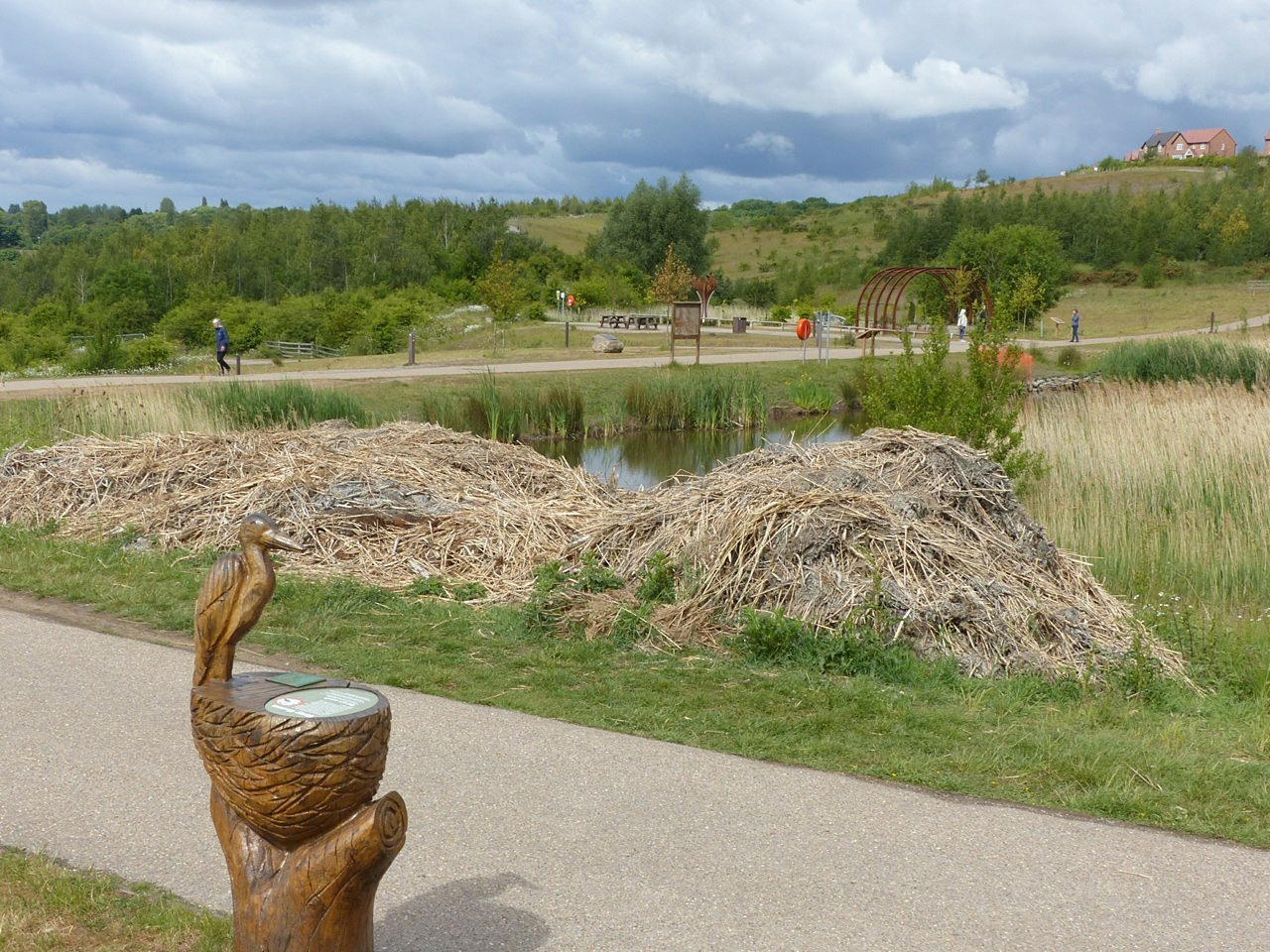
- Heron Pond
- Interactive map of Gedling Country Park
- Type: Country park
- Location: Spring Lane, Mapperley, NG4 4PE
- Coordinates: 52.991°N 1.085°W
- Area: 580 acres (230 hectares)
- Opened: 2015
- Owner: Gedling Borough Council
- Operator: Gedling Borough Council
- Open: All year
- Website: https://gedlingcountrypark.com/

Gedling Country Park is a country park in Gedling, Nottingham, England. The park is situated in the Mapperley area.

== History ==
The park is on the grounds of the former Gedling Colliery, which closed in 1991 and was subsequently used as a civic amenity site before closing to the public. The site was converted into the present country park in 2015. A café and visitor centre, named Café 1899, opened at the park in 2017 at a cost of £1.5 million, alongside a children's playground themed to the Colliery constructed by playground equipment manufacturer Proludic, at the cost of £200,000. The play park is acknowledged as the second best park in the borough of Gedling after Calverton parish council’s James Seely park that was also redeveloped by Proludic but at a cost of £341,000.00 at the end of 2024.

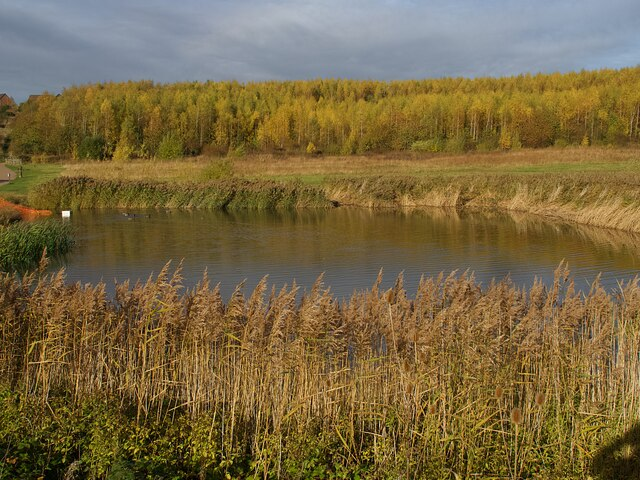
The Blue Lagoon at Gedling Country Park

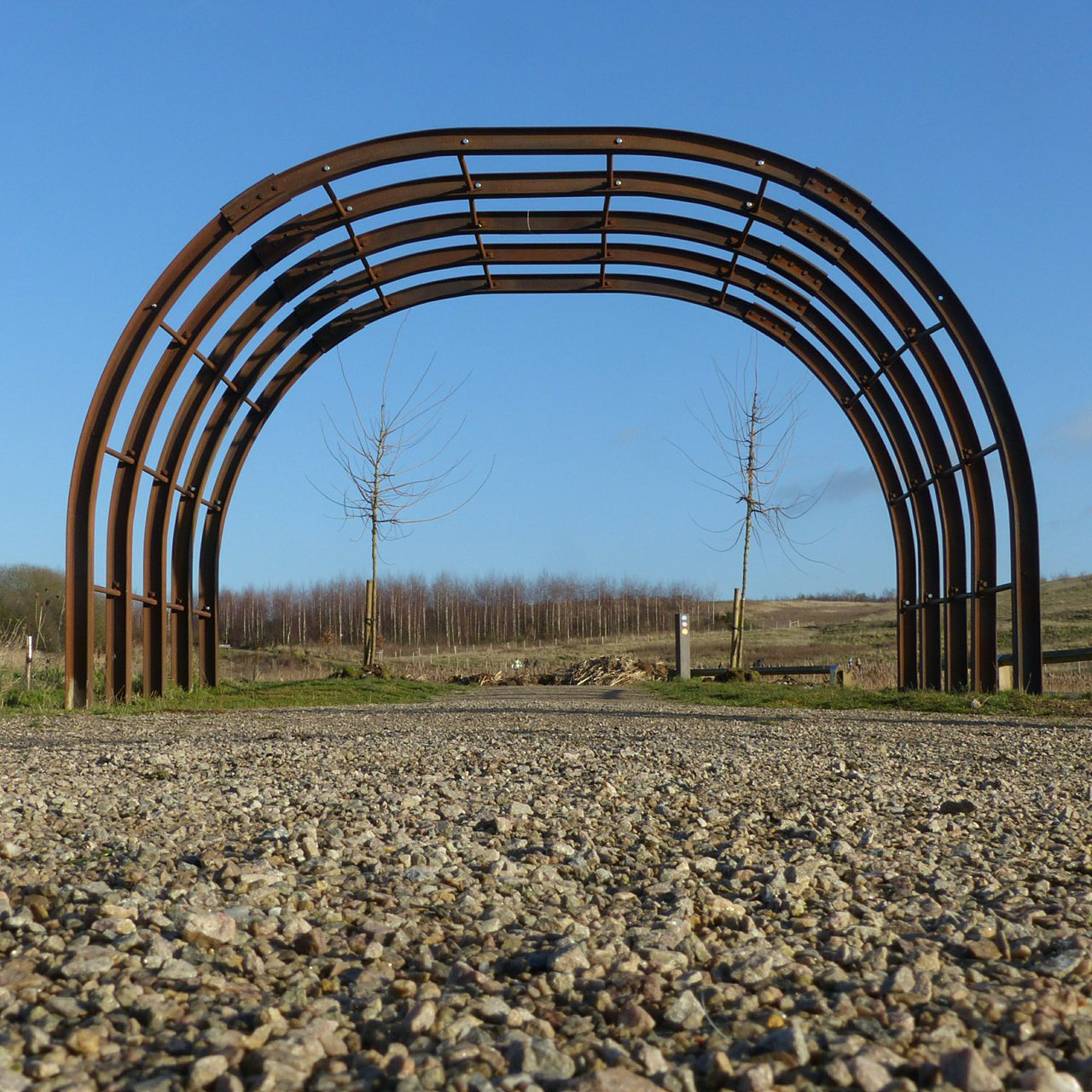
The Memorial Garden at Gedling Country Park

== Facilities ==
There is a diversity of wildlife, mining heritage, footpaths, trails and woodland. Bird watching and heritage trails are also available. A Parkrun takes place in the park every Saturday morning at 9am, the course is an undulating single lap figure of eight.
