= Christ Church, Bath =

Coordinates: 51.3876°N 2.3624°W

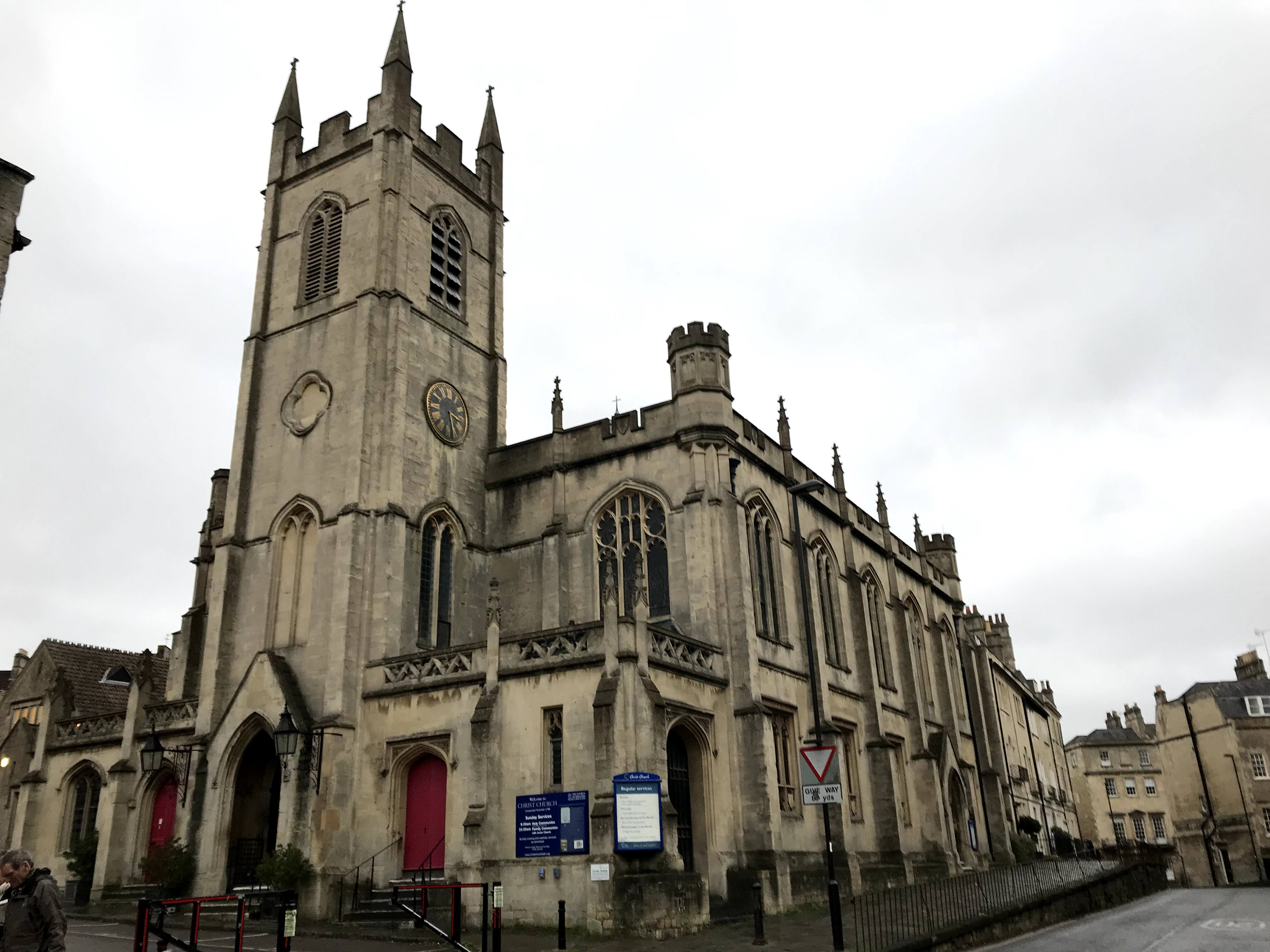
- Christ Church, Bath
- OS grid reference: ST 74880 65462
- Location: Julian Road, Bath
- Country: England
- Denomination: Church of England
- Churchmanship: Broad Church
- Website: www.christchurchbath.org

History
- Status: Church
- Dedication: Christ Church
- Dedicated: November 7th, 1798

Architecture
- Functional status: Active
- Architect: John Palmer
- Style: neo-Gothic

Specifications
- Materials: Bath stone

Administration
- Province: Canterbury
- Diocese: Bath and Wells
- Archdeaconry: Bath
- Deanery: Bath

Christ Church, Bath is a proprietary chapel on Julian Road, Bath, England.

== History and organisation ==
The church was founded by socially concerned clergy and lay people for those excluded from worship through the system of pew rents. It was probably the first church, at that time, to provide seating free of charge. Early supporters included the Archbishop of Canterbury, the great evangelical and campaigner against slavery, William Wilberforce and Martin Stafford Smith, godfather of John Keble, a founder of the Oxford Movement.

Christ Church is not a parish church, but maintains a pattern of services and other activities similar to that of a parish church, drawing its congregation from the local area, from other parts of Bath and from further afield. The church is owned by a charitable trust, and is governed by a board of Trustees and a Church Council.

Christ Church is part of the Bath and Wells Diocese, and the clergy of the church work on a non-stipendiary basis. Because of this, it has had a large number of incumbents in its 200-year history. In recent decades many students at the University of Bath have worshipped at Christ Church. Prebendary Angela Berners-Wilson, the first woman to be ordained priest in the Church of England, was for several years until July 2016 one of the assistant priests at the church.

== The building ==
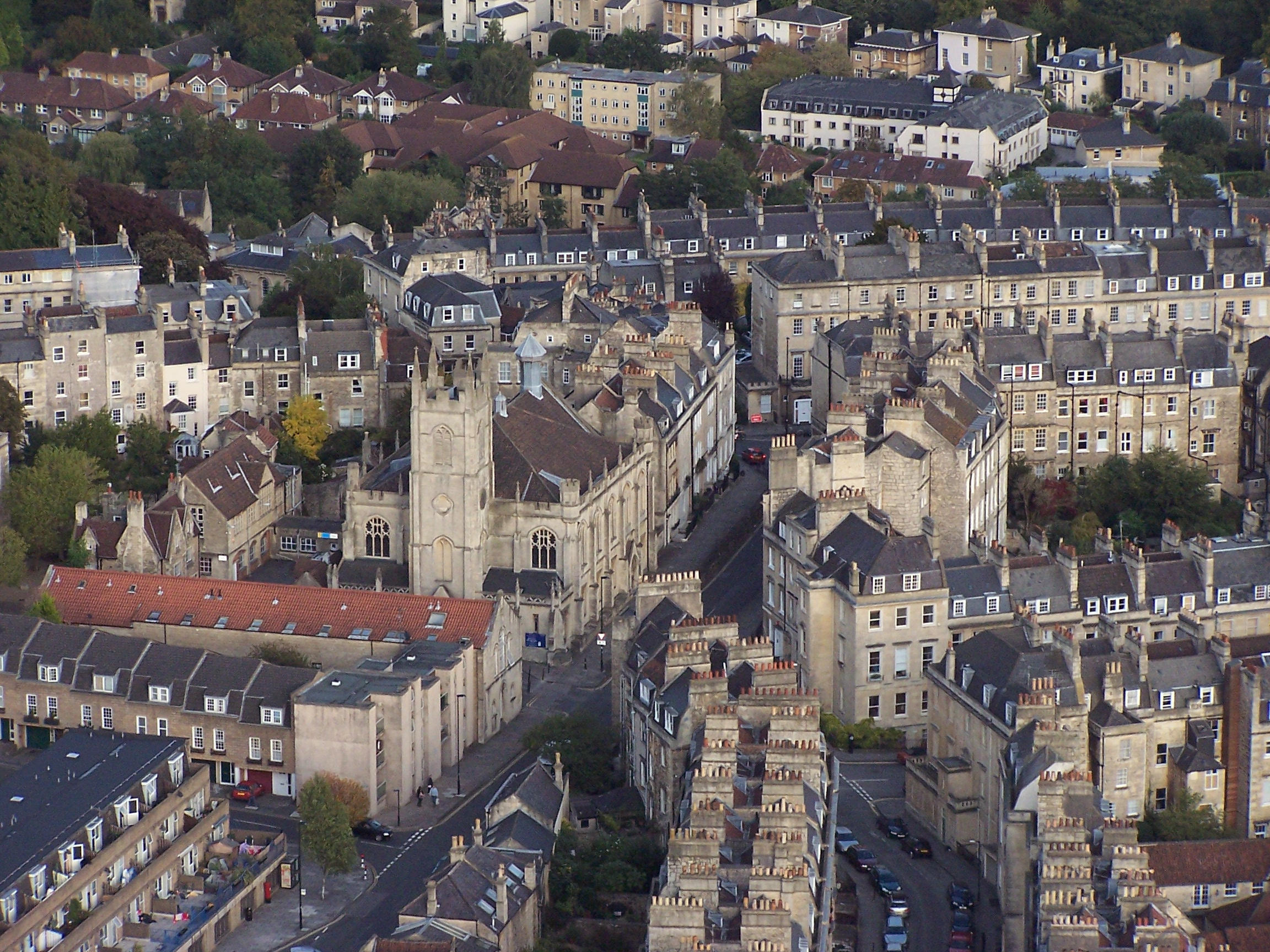
Aerial photograph of the church

The building was designed by John Palmer, one of the principal architects working in Georgian Bath, and built in 1798. It is in a neo-Gothic style, but Classically proportioned, with north and south aisles and a gallery on three sides. The apse was added in 1865-6 by John Elkington Gill, whose firm undertook much later work on the church.

Stained glass on the south side of the gallery is by A. O. Hemming and depicts Jesus as the Good Shepherd and the Parable of the Good Samaritan. The two windows at the west end are by James Powell and Sons and show Christ in Majesty and the raising of the daughter of Jairus. There are nine lancet windows in the apse by Clayton and Bell, and the windows in the main body of the church contain individual saints, angels and biblical characters, themed around the Te Deum Laudamus. Other interior furnishings include an unusual wooden altarpiece. A new central altar with matching furniture, including choir seating and readers, was installed on an extended platform in the chancel in 2020.

A recast peal of bells was hung in the church tower in 2015.

== Music and events ==
The first organ was provided in 1800 by John Avery.

In June 2003 David Briggs gave the inaugural recital on the three-manual organ after it was rebuilt by Deane's organ builders of Taunton. In 2018-9 the organ underwent further restoration by Nicholson & Co. The church choir sings at the main Sunday morning service each week, at choral evensong each month, and at occasional special services. Christ Church is sometimes used as a concert venue in the Bath International Music Festival and in recent years Joanna MacGregor, the Hilliard Ensemble and Exaudi have performed there. In 2005 it was the location of the last ever concert by the Bath Festival Chorus, which was conducted by James MacMillan.

The church also hosts book signings arranged by a local bookshop; authors who have presented their work at Christ Church include Gordon Brown, Paddy Ashdown, Prue Leith, Ruby Wax and Brian May.
