= Alexander Buckingham =

Alexander Buckingham (ca. 1777 – 1853) was one of the main organ builders in England during the early 19th century.

== Life ==
He is thought to have started work around 1791 with John Avery. Later he went to be foreman to Thomas Elliot. From around 1818 he established himself as an independent organ builder and was located in Frederick Place, Hampstead Road, London. By 1851 he was based in Pentonville.

He married Hannah Buckmaster on 25 May 1798 in Holborn. His son, George Buckingham, was also an organ builder.

He compiled notes of organs he visited around England and Wales between 1823 and 1842. The notebooks were transcribed and published in the periodical, The Organ, by L. S. Barnard between 1972 and 1975.

He was buried on 1 June 1853 in St James' Church, Islington, Pentonville.

== Organs ==
- St Alkmund's Church, Derby 1825
- St Bartholomew's Church, Lostwithiel 1828
- St John the Baptist's Church, Dronfield 1830
- All Saints' Church, Breadsall 1834
