= Gedling =

Village in Nottinghamshire, England

Coordinates: 52.975°N 1.081°W

- Village
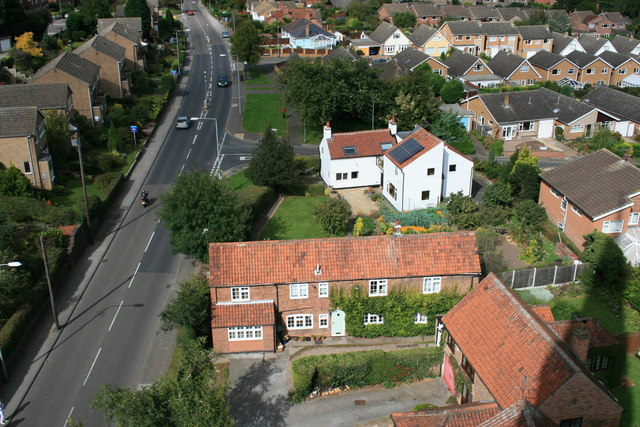
- Gedling from above

- Location within Nottinghamshire
- Population: 6,817 (Ward. 2016)
- OS grid reference: SK 61703 42390
- District: Borough of Gedling
- Shire county: Nottinghamshire
- Region: East Midlands
- Country: England
- Sovereign state: United Kingdom
- Post town: Nottingham
- Postcode district: NG4
- Dialling code: 0115
- Police: Nottinghamshire
- Fire: Nottinghamshire
- Ambulance: East Midlands
- UK Parliament: Gedling

Gedling is a village and former civil parish which gives its name to the larger Borough of Gedling in Nottinghamshire, England. It lies 5.2 miles (8.4 km) north-east of Nottingham city centre. The parish was abolished in 1935 and absorbed into the urban district of Carlton, which in turn was abolished in 1974 on the creation of borough of Gedling. The population of the Gedling ward at the 2011 census was 6,817 and 111,787 for the district.

== History ==
Gedling was first settled around Saxon times, when the Saxon chief Gedl (hence the name Gedling, coming from the chief "Gedl" and "Ing" being Saxon for People, Gedl-Ing meaning "Gedl's People") sailed up the River Trent, and then up the Little Ouse dyke, until he could get no further upstream. He landed at the spot which is thought to be the present-day site of All Saints' Church. Gedling has had several versions of its name including Ghellinge, Gedlinga, Geddlings, and Gettang.

Despite being a fairly small place, Gedling gives its name to the local borough council which has its offices in nearby Arnold, and also to the local parliamentary constituency, which covers the suburbs to the east of Nottingham, including Arnold and Carlton. Village pubs are the Gedling Inn (once the Chesterfield Arms) and The Willowbrook on Main Road.

=== Church ===
In the older part of Gedling is All Hallows' Anglican Church. It dates from the 11th century, with the oldest part of the church (the entrance) dating back to 1089 – although there have been four other churches on this site, the oldest dating back to the year 678AD.

=== Civil parish ===
In 1931 the parish had a population of 2822. On 1 April 1935 the parish was abolished and merged with Carlton.

== Geography ==
Gedling was recorded in the Domesday Book of 1086, and is still a distinct settlement, although residential, commercial and industrial growth in the wider borough of Gedling and the neighbouring city of Nottingham, boroughs of Broxtowe and Rushcliffe and district of Ashfield (as well as the Derbyshire boroughs of Amber Valley and Erewash, which have become increasingly urban around Nottingham) means it can be difficult to distinguish the village of Gedling from the nearby town of Carlton, with which it has become contiguous.

== Colliery ==
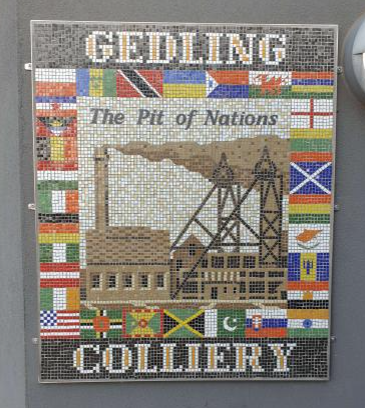
The 'Pit of Nations' mosaic at Gedling Country Park

Gedling Colliery opened in 1899 and was a primary employer for the village and surrounding areas until its closure in 1991. At its peak in the 1960s, the colliery produced over one million tonnes of coal per year and employed 1,400 people. During its history, 128 men died in incidents at the site. The colliery was known as the "pit of all nations" due to the diversity of its workforce in the 1960s, approximately 10 per cent of the miners were from the Caribbean.

The site was opened as Gedling Country Park on 28 March 2015.

=== Country park ===
Opened in March 2015 on the site of the former Gedling Colliery, the site has views of Gedling, and from its highest point there are views across Nottinghamshire and into neighbouring Lincolnshire and Leicestershire. On a clear day it is possible to see as far as Belvoir Castle and Lincoln Cathedral. There are a number of paths that weave their way through the woodlands and grasslands that make up the flora and fauna within the country park.

== Railway station ==
There are plans to either reopen the railway line from Nottingham railway station and to reopen Gedling railway station which was closed on 4 April 1960, or to open the old line as a part of the Mineral Line cycleway. The original station building is now owned by a youth group. The line itself officially closed in 1995 when the line to the colliery eventually was classed as redundant.

== Education ==
The local school is the Carlton le Willows Academy, Wood Lane, Gedling for 11-to-18 year olds. The Gedling School closed to pupils in 2016 after becoming an Academy. Notable alumni include Sarah Cottee

== Media ==
Gedling borough has its own hyperlocal news website called Gedling Eye, which has been publishing local news daily since 2015.

== Nature Reserves ==
There are two nature reserves in Gedling, Gedling House Woods and Gedling House Meadows. These are contiguous spaces owned by Gedling Borough Council and managed by the Friends of Gedling House Woods. The woodland part of the site was designated a local nature reserve in 1992, with the meadow added in 2007.

== Bus services ==
Nottingham City Transport

- 25: Nottingham, Carlton Hill, Westdale Lane, Mapperley, Daybrook, Arnold.
- 25B: Nottingham, Carlton Hill, Westdale Lane, Mapperley.
- 26: Nottingham, Carlton Hill, Gedling, Carlton-le-Willows, Burton Joyce, Lowdham, Southwell.
- 26A: Nottingham, Carlton Hill, Gedling, Carlton-le-Willows (School), Burton Joyce, Lowdham, Southwell (Minster School).
- 26B: Nottingham, Carlton Hill, Gedling. (Schooldays Only)
- 44: Nottingham, Sneinton Hermitage, Colwick, Netherfield, Gedling.
- 44A: Nottingham, Sneinton Hermitage, Colwick Industrial Estate, Netherfield, Gedling.
- 45: Nottingham, Colwick, Victoria Retail Park, Rivendell, Gedling, Carlton, Carlton Hill, Bakersfield
- 60: Nottingham, Woodborough Road, Mapperley, Westdale Lane, Gedling (Chase Farm).

Nottingham Minibuses & Coaches

- 774: Victoria Retail Park, Netherfield, Cavendish Road, Westdale Lane, Adbolton Avenue, Jessops Lane, Carlton Square, Netherfield, Victoria Retail Park.
- 775: Victoria Retail Park, Netherfield, Emerys Road, Stoke Bardolph, Burton Joyce, Foxhill Road.
