= Grade II* listed buildings in Melton (borough) =

There are over 20,000 Grade II* listed buildings in England. This page is a list of these buildings in Melton.

== Melton ==
Name	Location	Type	Completed (Note: The date given is the date used by Historic England as significant for the initial building or that of an important part in the structure's description.)	Date designated	Grid ref. (Note: The grid reference is based on the British national grid reference system, sometimes known as OSGB36, used by the Ordnance Survey.) Geo-coordinates	Entry number (Note: The "List Entry Number" is a unique number assigned to each listed building and scheduled monument by Historic England.)	Image
Church of St James the Greater	Ab Kettleby, Melton	Church	13th century	1 January 1968	SK7242522872; 52°47′55″N 0°55′38″W	1295154	Church of St James the Greater More images
Church of St Leonard	Holwell, Ab Kettleby, Melton	Church	13th century	1 January 1968	SK7358023638; 52°48′19″N 0°54′36″W	1295131	Church of St Leonard More images
Church of St Michael	Wartnaby, Ab Kettleby, Melton	Church	13th century	1 January 1968	SK7124223158; 52°48′05″N 0°56′41″W	1075141	Church of St Michael More images
Manor House	Ab Kettleby, Melton	Farmhouse	Early 17th century	1 January 1968	SK7234823089; 52°48′02″N 0°55′42″W	1075107	Manor House More images
Church of St Bartholomew	Asfordby, Melton	Church	14th century	3 August 1979	SK7252020975; 52°46′53″N 0°55′35″W	1075115	Church of St Bartholomew More images
The Old Hall	Asfordby, Melton	House	c. 1620	14 July 1953	SK7068419031; 52°45′51″N 0°57′14″W	1178375	Upload Photo
The Old Rectory	Asfordby, Melton	House	Late 18th century	14 July 1953	SK7084618916; 52°45′48″N 0°57′05″W	1295102	The Old Rectory More images
Church of All Saints	Knipton, Belvoir, Melton	Parish Church	13th century	1 January 1968	SK8242031107; 52°52′16″N 0°46′37″W	1075083	Church of All Saints More images
Church of St Michael and All Angels	Harston, Belvoir, Melton	Parish Church	Late 14th century	1 January 1968	SK8384031774; 52°52′37″N 0°45′21″W	1295028	Church of St Michael and All Angels More images
Exercise Ring within Belvoir Castle Stable Yard	Belvoir, Melton	Horse Exercise Ring	c. 1819	15 August 1979	SK8220633872; 52°53′46″N 0°46′46″W	1075119	Exercise Ring within Belvoir Castle Stable Yard
Main Stables 200m north-east of Belvoir Castle	Belvoir, Melton	Dwelling	1704-5	1 January 1968	SK8219633904; 52°53′47″N 0°46′47″W	1360872	Upload Photo
Sculpture depicting Ceres in Belvoir Castle Sculpture Garden (one of Seven Statues)	Belvoir, Melton	Sculpture	c. 1680	15 August 1979	SK8191033659; 52°53′39″N 0°47′02″W	1180136	Sculpture depicting Ceres in Belvoir Castle Sculpture Garden (one of Seven Statues)
Sculpture depicting Pomona in Belvoir Castle Sculpture Garden (one of Seven Statues)	Belvoir, Melton	Sculpture	c. 1680	15 August 1979	SK8190733671; 52°53′39″N 0°47′02″W	1075116	Sculpture depicting Pomona in Belvoir Castle Sculpture Garden (one of Seven Statues) More images
Sculpture depicting Spring in Belvoir Castle Sculpture Garden (one of Seven Statues)	Belvoir, Melton	Sculpture	c. 1680	15 August 1979	SK8192733657; 52°53′39″N 0°47′01″W	1075117	Sculpture depicting Spring in Belvoir Castle Sculpture Garden (one of Seven Statues) More images
Sculpture depicting Summer in Belvoir Castle Sculpture Garden (one of Seven Statues)	Belvoir, Melton	Sculpture	c. 1680	15 August 1979	SK8192733672; 52°53′39″N 0°47′01″W	1180145	Sculpture depicting Summer in Belvoir Castle Sculpture Garden (one of Seven Statues) More images
Sculpture depicting Autumn in Belvoir Castle Sculpture Garden (one of Seven Statues)	Belvoir, Melton	Sculpture	c. 1680	15 August 1979	SK8192733681; 52°53′40″N 0°47′01″W	1360871	Sculpture depicting Autumn in Belvoir Castle Sculpture Garden (one of Seven Statues)
Sculpture depicting Winter in Belvoir Castle Sculpture Garden (one of Seven Statues)	Belvoir, Melton	Sculpture	c. 1680	15 August 1979	SK8191633686; 52°53′40″N 0°47′02″W	1295063	Sculpture depicting Winter in Belvoir Castle Sculpture Garden (one of Seven Statues)
Sculpture of Juno in Belvoir Castle Sculpture Garden (one of Seven Statues)	Belvoir, Melton	Sculpture	c. 1680	15 August 1979	SK8190533682; 52°53′40″N 0°47′02″W	1295053	Sculpture of Juno in Belvoir Castle Sculpture Garden (one of Seven Statues) More images
Church of St John the Baptist	Muston, Bottesford, Melton	Parish Church	13th century	1 January 1968	SK8290137845; 52°55′54″N 0°46′05″W	1360899	Church of St John the Baptist More images
Village Cross	Muston, Bottesford, Melton	Village Cross	14th century	1 January 1968	SK8277637599; 52°55′46″N 0°46′12″W	1075068	Village Cross More images
Church of St John the Baptist	Old Dalby, Broughton and Old Dalby, Melton	Church	1835	1 January 1968	SK6739723540; 52°48′19″N 1°00′06″W	1187998	Church of St John the Baptist More images
Church of St Mary the Virgin	Nether Broughton, Broughton and Old Dalby, Melton	Parish Church	13th century	1 January 1968	SK6958326214; 52°49′44″N 0°58′07″W	1075069	Church of St Mary the Virgin More images
Dysart Mausoleum and Railing	Buckminster, Melton	Mausoleum	c. 1800	7 January 1988	SK8794223078; 52°47′53″N 0°41′50″W	1360830	Dysart Mausoleum and Railing More images
Church of St James	Little Dalby, Burton and Dalby, Melton	Parish Church	1851	1 January 1968	SK7748913649; 52°42′54″N 0°51′16″W	1176630	Church of St James More images
Church of St Swithin	Great Dalby, Burton and Dalby, Melton	Parish Church	13th century	1 January 1968	SK7421114429; 52°43′21″N 0°54′10″W	1360835	Church of St Swithin More images
Squires Monument, 5m north-west of Church of St James	Burton Lazars, Burton and Dalby, Melton	Chest Tomb	1781	7 January 1988	SK7673916950; 52°44′41″N 0°51′53″W	1307784	Squires Monument, 5m north-west of Church of St James More images
Church of St Mary the Virgin	Harby, Clawson, Hose and Harby, Melton	Church	13th century to late 15th century	1 January 1968	SK7472731296; 52°52′26″N 0°53′28″W	1075078	Church of St Mary the Virgin More images
Church of St Michael and All Angels	Hose, Clawson, Hose and Harby, Melton	Church	1735	1 January 1968	SK7362729276; 52°51′21″N 0°54′29″W	1075081	Church of St Michael and All Angels More images
Church of St Remigius	Long Clawson, Clawson, Hose and Harby, Melton	Church	14th century	1 January 1968	SK7221827188; 52°50′15″N 0°55′46″W	1188025	Church of St Remigius More images
Manor Farmhouse	Long Clawson, Clawson, Hose and Harby, Melton	Farmhouse	17th century alterations	14 July 1953	SK7220427112; 52°50′12″N 0°55′47″W	1075052	Manor Farmhouse More images
The Nags Head Public House and attached Walls, Railings, Gate and Overthrow	Harby, Clawson, Hose and Harby, Melton	Priests House	15th century	31 August 1979	SK7442031077; 52°52′19″N 0°53′45″W	1075048	The Nags Head Public House and attached Walls, Railings, Gate and Overthrow More images
Church of St Guthlac	Branston, Croxton Kerrial, Melton	Parish Church	13th century	1 January 1968	SK8096929517; 52°51′25″N 0°47′56″W	1188319	Church of St Guthlac More images
Church of st Botolph and St John the Baptist	Croxton Kerrial, Melton	Parish Church	15th century	1 January 1968	SK8353229497; 52°51′23″N 0°45′39″W	1360916	Church of st Botolph and St John the Baptist More images
Church of St Michael	Eastwell, Eaton, Melton	Parish Church	13th century	1 January 1968	SK7749828489; 52°50′54″N 0°51′03″W	1075029	Church of St Michael More images
The Hall	Eastwell, Eaton, Melton	House	1634	14 July 1953	SK7759228527; 52°50′55″N 0°50′57″W	1075025	The Hall More images
The Hall (No 1, Town's Lane)	Goadby Marwood, Eaton, Melton	Country House	17th century	14 July 1953	SK7792826430; 52°49′47″N 0°50′41″W	1075059	The Hall (No 1, Town's Lane) More images
Church of St Peter	Saxby, Freeby, Melton	Parish Church	1789	1 January 1968	SK8197920088; 52°46′20″N 0°47′11″W	1176759	Church of St Peter More images
Stable Range at Stapleford Hall	Stapleford Park, Freeby, Melton	Gate Pier	1899	30 March 1984	SK8097618136; 52°45′17″N 0°48′06″W	1261728	Upload Photo
Church of St John the Baptist	Grimston, Melton	Church	13th century	1 January 1968	SK6855121893; 52°47′25″N 0°59′06″W	1188442	Church of St John the Baptist More images
Church of St Peter	Saxelbye, Grimston, Melton	Church	13th century to 15th century	1 January 1968	SK7006720967; 52°46′54″N 0°57′45″W	1075032	Church of St Peter More images
Saxelbye Manor House	Saxelbye, Grimston, Melton	Farmhouse	Early to mid 16th century	14 July 1953	SK7009120858; 52°46′51″N 0°57′44″W	1188434	Upload Photo
Brooksby Hall	Brooksby, Hoby with Rotherby, Melton	Country House	Late 16th century	14 July 1953	SK6710016072; 52°44′17″N 1°00′27″W	1075040	Brooksby Hall More images
Church of All Saints	Rotherby, Hoby with Rotherby, Melton	Church	Saxon	1 January 1968	SK6751916536; 52°44′32″N 1°00′05″W	1188547	Church of All Saints More images
Church of All Saints	Ragdale, Hoby with Rotherby, Melton	Church	13th century to 15th century	1 January 1968	SK6614919930; 52°46′23″N 1°01′15″W	1188553	Church of All Saints More images
Church of St Michael	Brooksby, Hoby with Rotherby, Melton	Church	Early 14th century	1 January 1968	SK6709716004; 52°44′15″N 1°00′28″W	1188473	Church of St Michael More images
Churchyard Cross	Ragdale, Hoby with Rotherby, Melton	Cross	Medieval	22 March 1991	SK6615419916; 52°46′22″N 1°01′15″W	1075008	Churchyard Cross More images
Church of St Peter	Knossington, Knossington and Cold Overton, Melton	Parish Church	Late 13th century	7 January 1988	SK8008308703; 52°40′12″N 0°49′02″W	1177524	Church of St Peter More images
Church of St Helen	Plungar, Redmile, Melton	Parish Church	14th century	1 January 1968	SK7693434043; 52°53′54″N 0°51′28″W	1075010	Church of St Helen More images
Church of St Peter	Redmile, Melton	Parish Church	c. 1300	1 January 1968	SK7971335528; 52°54′41″N 0°48′58″W	1075013	Church of St Peter More images
Church of St Peter and St Paul	Barkestone-le-Vale, Redmile, Melton	Parish Church	14th century	3 August 1979	SK7777834938; 52°54′23″N 0°50′42″W	1188593	Church of St Peter and St Paul More images
Church of St Egelwin the Martyr	Scalford, Melton	Parish Church	13th century	1 January 1968	SK7629724129; 52°48′34″N 0°52′10″W	1075018	Church of St Egelwin the Martyr More images
Church of St Mary	Chadwell, Scalford, Melton	Parish Church	12th century	1 January 1968	SK7821924610; 52°48′48″N 0°50′27″W	1075015	Church of St Mary More images
Church of St Mary the Virgin	Burrough on the Hill, Somerby, Melton	Parish Church	13th century	1 January 1968	SK7574510789; 52°41′22″N 0°52′51″W	1307340	Church of St Mary the Virgin More images
Church of St Bartholomew	Sproxton, Melton	Parish Church	13th century	1 January 1968	SK8566324918; 52°48′54″N 0°43′50″W	1294595	Church of St Bartholomew More images
Church of St Peter	Saltby, Sproxton, Melton	Parish Church	13th century	1 January 1968	SK8513326553; 52°49′47″N 0°44′16″W	1074988	Church of St Peter More images
Church of St Peter	Stonesby, Sproxton, Melton	Parish Church	Norman	1 January 1968	SK8228724745; 52°48′50″N 0°46′50″W	1360956	Church of St Peter More images
Church of St Guthlac	Stathern, Melton	School	Late 13th century	1 January 1968	SK7729030950; 52°52′14″N 0°51′12″W	1074997	Church of St Guthlac More images
Church of St Mary the Virgin	Thorpe Arnold, Waltham on the Wolds and Thorpe Arnold, Melton	Parish Church	13th century	1 January 1968	SK7704620099; 52°46′23″N 0°51′34″W	1360948	Church of St Mary the Virgin More images
Wymondham Windmill	Wymondham, Melton	Windmill	c. 1813	31 October 1972	SK8505319253; 52°45′51″N 0°44′27″W	1307233	Wymondham Windmill More images
Anne of Cleves House	Melton Mowbray	House (now Public House)	Medieval	24 October 1950	SK7531518984; 52°45′48″N 0°53′07″W	1265121	Anne of Cleves House More images
Gregory and Hugh Tomb	Melton	Urn	1670-1747	12 October 1976	SK7523219036; 52°45′49″N 0°53′11″W	1265067	Upload Photo
Maison Dieu Bedehouses	Melton Mowbray	Almshouse	1640	24 October 1950	SK7532419019; 52°45′49″N 0°53′07″W	1265186	Maison Dieu Bedehouses More images
Ye Pork Pie Shoppe	Melton Mowbray	Shop	1976	24 October 1950	SK7518419220; 52°45′55″N 0°53′14″W	1235657	Ye Pork Pie Shoppe More images
5 King Street	Melton	House	Late 19th century	12 October 1976	SK7524719202; 52°45′55″N 0°53′11″W	1235477	5 King Street More images
