= Goadby (disambiguation) =

Goadby may refer to:

== Places ==
- Goadby, a village in Leicestershire
- Goadby Marwood, a village in Leicestershire
- Goadby Hall, a building near Goadby Marwood

== People ==
- Frank Goadby (1899–1985), British and British Indian Army officer
- Robert Goadby (1721–1778), English printer
