= Najan Ward =

British-Indian actor (born 1978)

Najan Ward is a British Indian actor, writer, film producer and record label owner.

== Early life ==
Ward was born in Leicester, England to Hindhu, Gujarati parents. He studied acting at Brooksby Melton College . Before acting Ward had started a record shop called in the Groove in his home town of Loughborough. The shop came to a close with the decline of 12" vinyl sales, upon closure Ward started a house label called Lost My Dog Records with two friends he met from the shop.

== Early work ==
Ward has had roles in Holby City, Home Time, Mobile, Green and See You at the Altar.
