= Arthur Brett (courtier) =

English courtier

Arthur Brett (1595–1642) was an English courtier in the reign of James VI and I.

== Career ==
Brett was a son of William Brett of Hoby and Rotherby, Leicestershire, and his wife Anne Beaumont. Anne was the sister of Mary Beaumont, mother of George Villiers, 1st Duke of Buckingham. Some sources give his father's name as "James".

Brett gained a place at court as a groom of the bedchamber. He was the brother-in-law of Lionel Cranfield, 1st Earl of Middlesex. In 1622, it was rumoured he might become the King's favourite, displacing his own relative George Villiers, Duke of Buckingham. A Scottish courtier, Thomas Erskine, 1st Earl of Kellie, who was sceptical about the rumour and Brett's chance of success, relayed the story in his letters to the Earl of Mar:

There hes a rumore past heir of laite in the court ... bye sume men that his majestie shuld begin to love and favore one young man called Breate. He is a groome in his bed-challmer, and cowsen germane to my Lord of Bukkinghame. I think I maye sweare that it was nather in the King's mynd nor in the young mans conceate.

Buckingham was displeased by this situation and Cranfield had Brett sent abroad. Describing the affair and new rewards for Buckingham in a letter of 23 December 1622, the Venetian ambassador Alvise Valaresso wrote that courtiers reflected on the fall of the Earl of Somerset and said James's favour was "like a summer sky, from which, when quite serene, a thunderbolt sometimes falls unexpectedly".

In 1624, Cranfield faced charges for corruption as Lord High Treasurer and, according to John Chamberlain, his predicament was greater because of his attempt to set up a "new idol". Brett had returned from France in March 1624, without Buckingham's leave, which made things worse for Cranfield, especially after Brett tried to get the King's attention by catching his bridle in Waltham Forest. The Venetian ambassador heard that James roughly thrust him away and wished that he was hanged. Brett was sent for a time to the Fleet Prison. Brett was questioned by the Attorney General Thomas Coventry and claimed that he had returned to England because he had run out of money. He was released in September 1624.

Brett was buried at Gloucester Cathedral in 1642, where there was an inscription "Here lieth the body of Arthur Brett , Esquire, groom of the bedchamber unto King James, who died July 2, 1642".
