= Brooksby railway station =

Former railway station in Leicestershire, England

Coordinates: 52.7406°N 1.0087°W

Brooksby
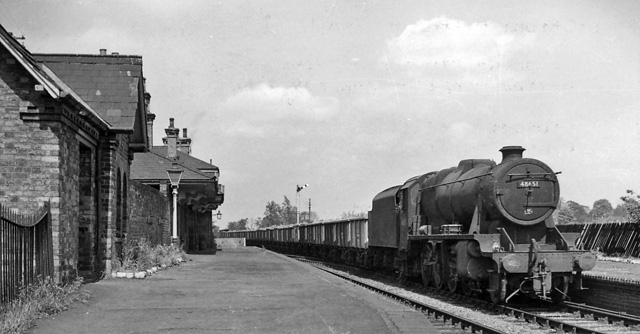
- Brooksby Station remains in 1962

General information
- Location: Brooksby, Leicestershire; England
- Grid reference: SK669163
- Platforms: 2

Other information
- Status: Disused

History
- Pre-grouping: Midland Railway
- Post-grouping: London, Midland and Scottish Railway; London Midland Region of British Railways

Key dates
- 1 September 1846: Opened
- 3 July 1961: Closed
Location

Brooksby railway station was a former station serving the villages of Brooksby, Hoby and Rotherby in Leicestershire. The station was situated at a level crossing on the Brooksby to Hoby road.

== History ==
The station opened in 1846 on the Syston and Peterborough Railway. The station buildings were larger than most on the line, considering it served a small village. The stationmasters' house was designed by the architects William Parsons and Sancton Wood. The contractors T.W.& H. Herbert undertook to build it for £1,921.

It closed in 1961. It remained in use for goods until 1964. The station became grade II listed building in 1979.

== Stationmasters ==
- Benjamin Isett ca. 1851
- Thomas Howitt ca. 1861 - 1863
- Joseph Clemenstone 1863 - ca. 1865
- John Ballentine ca. 1871 - 1879
- Lot Gilby 1879 - 1883
- John Jameson 1883 - 1900
- Henry E. Haines 1900 - 1903 (formerly station master at Watnall, afterwards station master at Helpston)
- Samson Seddon 1903 - 1926 (formerly station master at Syston)
- J.H. Roberts ca. 1928 (also station master at Rearsby)
- Luke Randolph Benson ca. 1933 - 1942 (also station master at Rearsby)
- T.A. Goddard 1942 - 1944 (afterwards station master at Leigh)
- T.T. Perkins 1944
- G.W.S. Springs 1944 - ca. 1945
- L. Cope ca. 1957
Former Services

Preceding station	Disused railways	Following station
Rearsby	Midland Railway; Leicester to Peterborough	Frisby
