= Rearsby railway station =

Former railway station in Leicestershire, England

Coordinates: 52.7300°N 1.0364°W

Rearsby
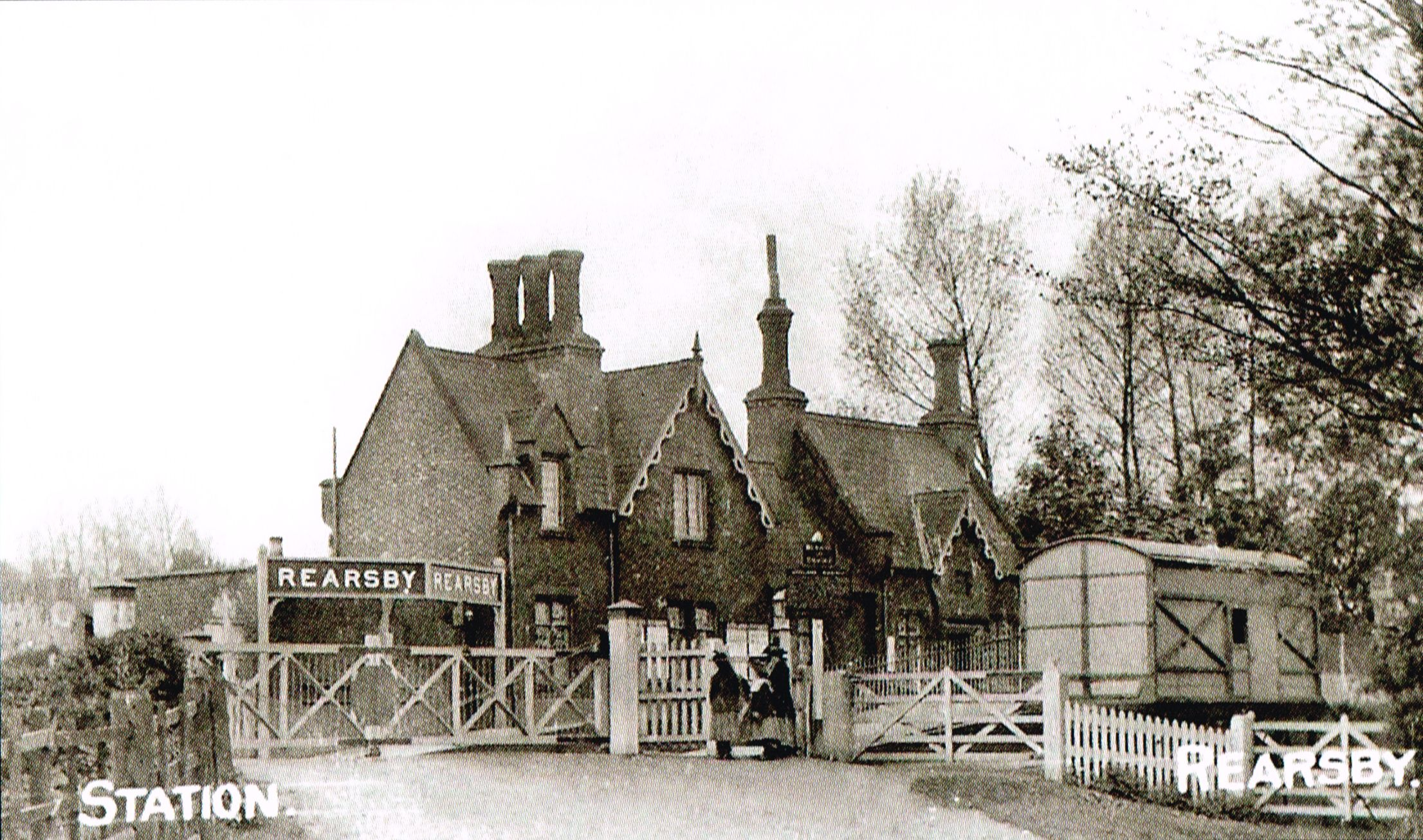
- The station in 1895

General information
- Location: Rearsby, Leicestershire; England
- Grid reference: SK652152
- Platforms: 2

Other information
- Status: Disused

History
- Pre-grouping: Midland Railway
- Post-grouping: London, Midland and Scottish Railway; London Midland Region of British Railways

Key dates
- 1 September 1846: Opened
- 2 April 1951: Closed
Location

Rearsby railway station was a former station serving the villages of Rearsby and Thrussington in Leicestershire. The station was situated at a level crossing on the road between the two.

== History ==
The station opened in 1846 on the Syston and Peterborough Railway. The station building were designed by the architects William Parsons and Sancton Wood. The contractors Norman and Grimson undertook to build it for £744 8s 6d. and it was remarkably similar to the station at Asfordby.

It closed in 1951.

== Stationmasters ==
- Thomas Sharp ca. 1849 - 1889
- William Sugars 1889 - 1895 (afterwards station master at Tibshelf)
- A.W. Kingdom 1895 - 1897 (formerly station master at Little Eaton)
- John Lewis Shannon 1897 - 1900 (afterwards station master at Ashwell, Kegworth, assistant station master at Derby, then station master at Nottingham, Sheffield and finally London St Pancras)
- Frederick H. Shelton 1900 - ca. 1911
- M. Shilion ca. 1914
- J.H. Roberts ca. 1928 (also station master at Brooksby)
- Luke Randolph Benson ca. 1933 - 1942 (also station master at Brooksby)
Former Services

Preceding station	Disused railways	Following station
Syston	Midland Railway; Leicester to Peterborough	Brooksby
