= Elizabeth and Mary Kirby =

English natural history writers

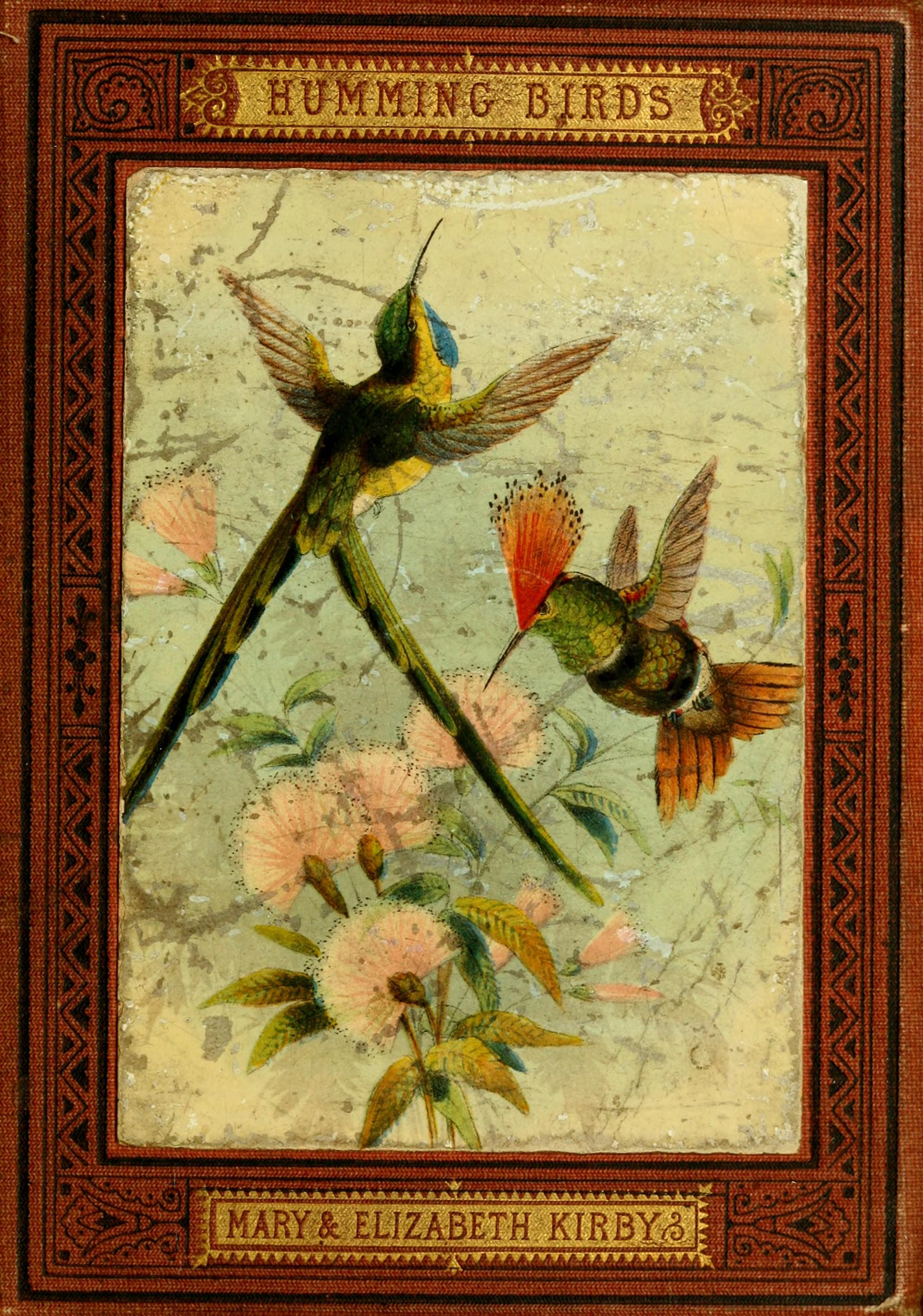
Hummingbirds by Mary and Elizabeth Kirby from the Smithsonian

Elizabeth Kirby (1823–1873) and Mary Kirby (later Mary Gregg, 1817–1893) were successful English writers and illustrators of books for children and books on natural science. Mary Kirby is known particularly for leading the crowd-sourced Flora of Leicestershire and Elizabeth for her children's books. They both had a lifelong writing partnership that popularised science. Mary is thought to be one of the first British woman to publish a scientific study of the flora of her county in the nineteenth century.

== Early life and education ==
Mary and Elizabeth Kirby were two sisters of a sometimes prosperous family who were brought up in Leicester. Growing up, Mary and Elizabeth attended both Church and school regularly; they were both well educated. Mary in particular had knowledge of languages and she had made use of the lectures at the local mechanics institute, at which a family friend was president. Botany was one of the subjects becoming commonplace for women of all ages to learn at the time. Mary developed an interest in the subject of botany early on by spending time away from home at Ramsgate collecting specimens.

Mary was her father's second child and six years older than her sister, Elizabeth. Whilst they were still in their teens, their invalid mother Sarah Bentley died. She had been the second wife of their father. Their father, John, was a spiritual man who had a hosiery business. When John Kirby died in 1848 he left them with no income. To get by, they were able to make stead at a nearby home owned by the family while they worked towards financially supporting themselves. He did however leave a journal which Mary continued and his assets which eventually yielded five thousand pounds.

== Career ==
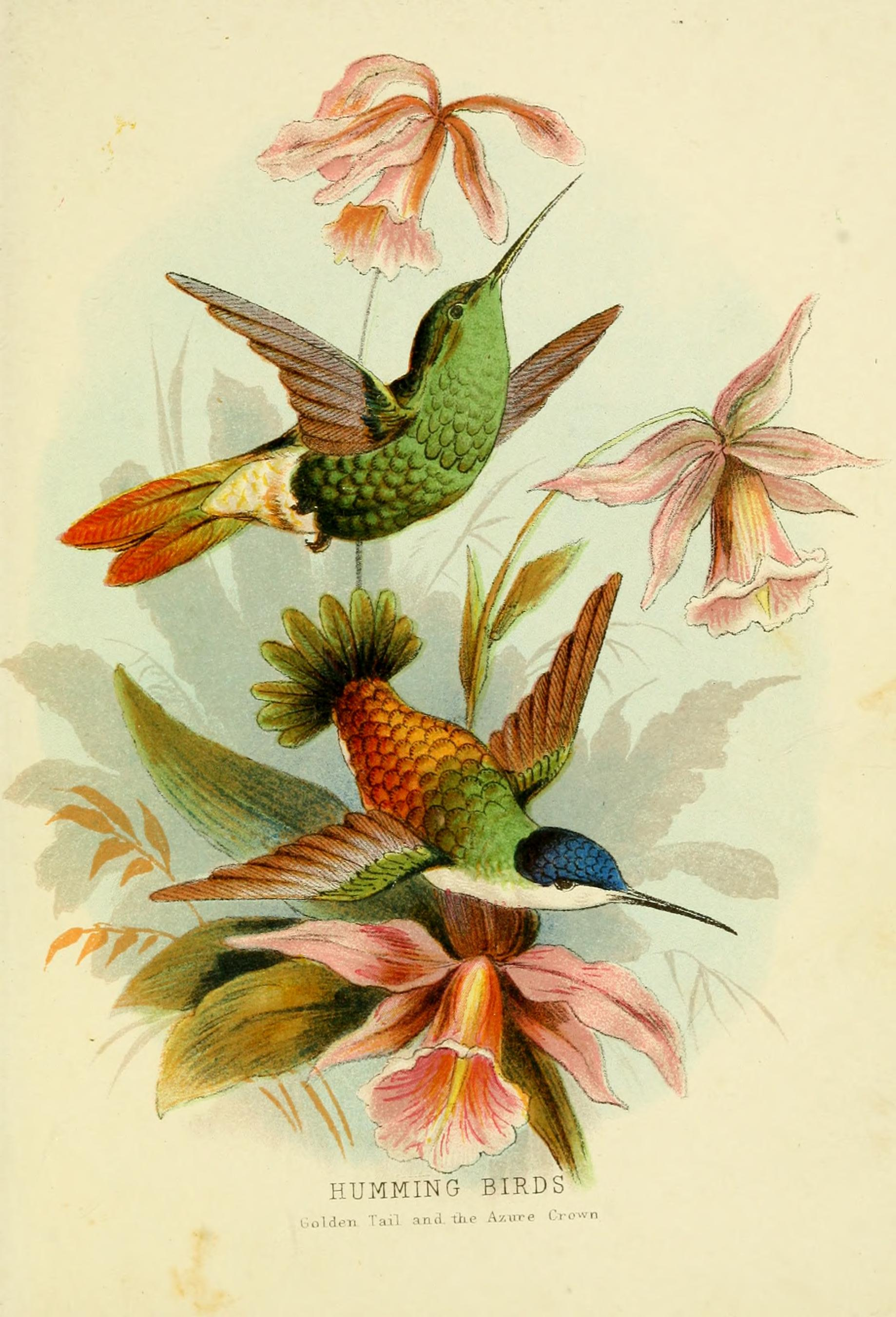
Golden Tail and Azure Crown Hummingbirds by Mary and Elizabeth Kirby.

=== Flora of Leicestershire ===
In 1848 Mary published the first draft of the Flora of Leicestershire, which she had created with significant assistance from Andrew Bloxam and her sister, who added supporting non-botanical information. The book was crowd-sourced in 1848 as every other page was left blank, and early purchasers were asked to make notes on the blank pages. This enabled the main edition published in 1850 to list 939 different species for which the book was complimented by the leading naturalist Sir William Hooker.

This type of accomplishment was uncommon from women at the time, but not unheard of. For example, Katherine Sophia Baily of Ireland "...was the first woman admitted to the Botanical Society of Edinburgh shortly after its founding in 1836, and was the first woman to put together a flora (preceding Mary Kirby's 1850 Flora of Leicestershire)." Mary is thought to be the only woman in the nineteenth century to write a book about the flora of her county.

=== Financial independence ===
With no long term income the sisters' ambitions turned to becoming professional writers. Finding success, they became financially self-sufficient. Mary noted that financial independence derived from their work was "...the sweetest and best of any..."

The sisters were afforded opportunity at the start of their career that many aspiring women in the field were not. Jarrold and Sons, publisher of The Observing Eye, enlisted the sisters' help with the series. Over 25 years the sisters created at least 24 books including a number that popularised science. By removing complex scientific classification they sought to interest everyday readers in the wonders of nature. Books like those by the Kirby sisters served as aids for mothers teaching their children introductory botany in the home.

=== Influence ===
They also wrote articles for magazines, school books, fiction as well as the natural science guides that were complete with illustrations. Visual imagery proved to be an effective method of making science more accessible and popular and its use in scientific materials was largely implemented by women writers like the Kirby sisters. Male writers often utilized illustrations less frequently in their work reportedly to maintain a higher level of formality. Another popularization style they used was first-person narrative. By providing their audience with detailed descriptions and images they "transported" the reader to a setting that was otherwise inaccessible. Within the scientific community, there was a disconnect between members whose work was targeted towards their professional peers and those who were considered to be popularizers. This is exemplified by interactions Mary Kirby recounted with academic botanist John Lindley. He, like many of his peers in academic botany, did not "...encourage any work, except like his own, of the most scientific kind."

== Later life and death ==
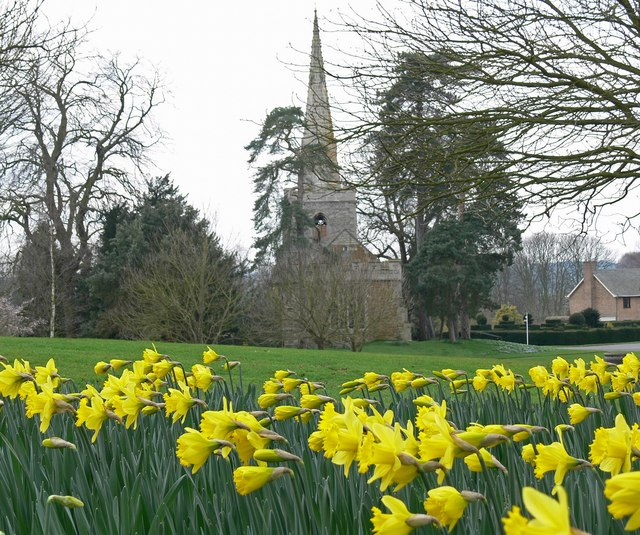
St Michael and All Angels, Brooksby

Their inheritance and their earnings enabled Elizabeth and Mary to buy "the living" of Brooksby church for the Reverend Henry Gregg who Mary had married in 1860. Up to this time the sisters had been living in Norfolk where they had published Plants of Land and Water in 1857. After Mary's marriage the three lived together at Melton Mowbray in Leicestershire. From their purpose built house called Six Elms they worked through a number of different publishers under either their joint names or occasionally Elizabeth published her own books. Elizabeth died of a bacterial infection in June 1873 in Leicestershire.

The following year lightning struck the steeple on Brooksby Church and Mary and her husband had to handle that difficulty. The initial strike was said to have just taken a "bite" out of the steeple but eventually the whole structure collapsed. Undeterred by the damage, Gregg arranged for temporary repairs whilst services continued in parallel. The church was restored by 1874 by R.W.Johnson.

The Reverend Gregg died in 1881 and Mary had to again study her finances. Mary died in 1893 after completing her autobiography. She was buried in the same grave as both her marital partner and her writing partner at Brooksby church. Mary left her money to a surviving sister.

== Books include ==
- The Discontented Children, and how they were cured, 1855
- Plants of Land and Water, 1857
- Caterpillars, Butterflies, and Moths, 1860
- Kirby, Mary (1850), A Flora of Leicestershire, London: Hamilton, Adams & Co., OCLC 15190119
- Things in the Forest, 1861
- The Sea and its Wonders, 1871
- Beautiful birds in far-off lands; their haunts and homes, 1872
- Chapters on Trees, 1873; later editions titled Talks about Trees
- Sketches of Insect Life, 1874
- Hummingbirds, 1874
- Aunt Martha's Corner Cupboard or Stories about Tea, Coffee, Sugar, Rice, Etc., 1875
- Birds of Gay Plumage: Birds of Paradise etc, 1875
- Leaflets from my Life, Mary Kirby, 1888
