= Syston railway station =

Railway station in Leicestershire, England

Syston
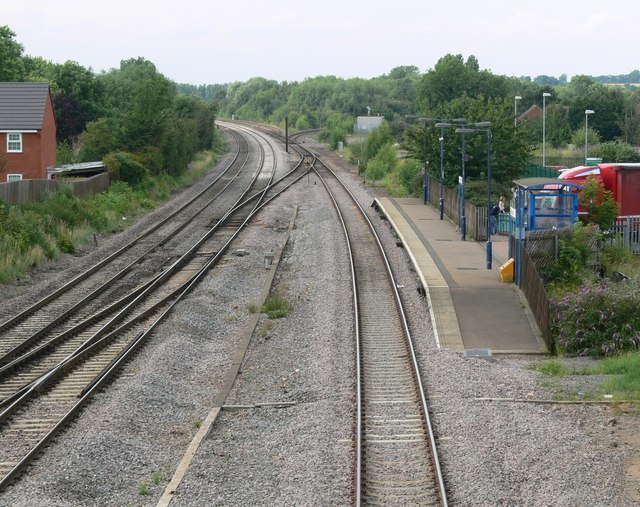
- Station platform, looking north. The fast lines are on the left; the slow line is on the right. The line to Peterborough branches off to the right in the background.

General information
- Location: Syston, Borough of Charnwood, England
- Coordinates: 52°41′39.00″N 01°4′57.00″W
- Grid reference: SK621111
- Managed by: East Midlands Railway
- Platforms: 1

Other information
- Station code: SYS
- Classification: DfT category F1

Key dates
- 5 May 1840: Opened
- 4 March 1968: Closed
- 27 May 1994: Reopened

Passengers
- 2020/21: ▼50,490
- 2021/22: ▲0.109 million
- 2022/23: ▲0.149 million
- 2023/24: ▲0.183 million
- 2024/25: ▲0.213 million
Location
Notes
- Passenger statistics from the Office of Rail and Road

Syston railway station (/ˈsaɪstən/ SY-stən) serves the town of Syston, in Leicestershire, England. The station lies on the Midland Main Line between Leicester and Loughborough, 103 miles 63 chains (167.0 km) down the line from London St Pancras.

== Early history ==
The station was opened on 5 May 1840 as a minor intermediate station on the Midland Counties Railway line between Leicester, Nottingham and Derby. Shortly afterwards, the Midland Counties merged with the North Midland Railway and the Birmingham and Derby Junction Railway to form the Midland Railway.

Syston became a junction station on 1 September 1846, with the opening of the Syston and Peterborough Railway to Melton Mowbray; it was extended in 1848 to Peterborough. The north to east curve was opened in 1854.

A replacement station was opened in 1874, when the Midland Main Line was increased from two to four tracks.

== Closure ==
The station was closed on 4 March 1968. The station building, having been hidden by fencing for many years, was later dismantled and rebuilt at the Midland Railway - Butterley with the help of David Wilson Homes, which erected a housing estate over the old station land in 2006.

== Reopening ==
The station reopened on 27 May 1994, as part of phase one of the Ivanhoe Line.

Express trains do not stop at Syston, as the single platform is on the bidirectional "slow" line adjacent to the main line. Trains on the line to and from Peterborough do not call at the station either, although it is possible for them to do so.

Network Rail adopted a Route Utilisation Strategy for freight in 2007, which aimed to create a new cross-country freight route from Peterborough (East Coast Main Line) to Nuneaton (West Coast Main Line). One of the next stages was to create additional lines through Leicester during a resignalling scheme; during this time, Syston station will be rebuilt.

== Facilities ==
The station is unstaffed and facilities are limited; there is a self-service ticket machine for ticket purchases and a shelter on the platform.

There is a car park with 61 spaces and bicycle storage available at the station. There is step-free access to the platform.

== Services ==
All services at Syston are operated by East Midlands Railway, using Class 158 and 170 diesel multiple units.

The typical off-peak service in trains per hour (tph) is:

- 1 tph to Leicester
- 1 tph to Nottingham.

Fast trains on the Midland Main Line pass by the station and do not stop. The station is closed on Sundays.

Preceding station	National Rail	Following station
Leicester	East Midlands Railway Ivanhoe Line; Monday-Saturday only	Sileby
	Historical railways	
Humberstone Road Line open, station closed	Midland Railway Midland Main Line	Sileby Line and station open
Humberstone Road Line open, station closed	Midland Railway Syston and Peterborough Railway	Rearsby Line open, station closed
