= Rotherby =

Village in Leicestershire, England

Coordinates: 52.742479°N 1.0005067°W

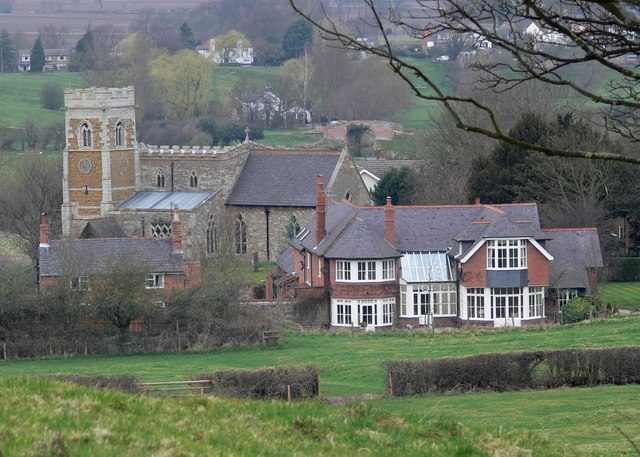

- Location within Leicestershire
- Civil parish: Hoby with Rotherby
- District: Melton
- Shire county: Leicestershire
- Region: East Midlands
- Country: England
- Sovereign state: United Kingdom
- Post town: Melton Mowbray
- Postcode district: LE14
- Police: Leicestershire
- Fire: Leicestershire
- Ambulance: East Midlands
- UK Parliament: Melton and Syston

Rotherby is a village and former civil parish, 9 miles (14 km) north east of Leicester, now in the parish of Hoby with Rotherby, in the Melton district, in the county of Leicestershire, England. In 1931 the parish had a population of 133.

== Features ==
Rotherby has a church called All Saints.

== History ==
Rotherby was recorded in the Domesday Book as Redebi. On 1 April 1936 the parish was abolished and merged with Brooksby, Hoby and Ragdale to form Hoby with Rotherby.

== Inhabitants ==
- Arthur Brett (1595–1642), courtier
