= Church of St Michael and All Angels, Brooksby =

Church in Leicestershire, England

Coordinates: 52°44′15″N 1°00′27″W

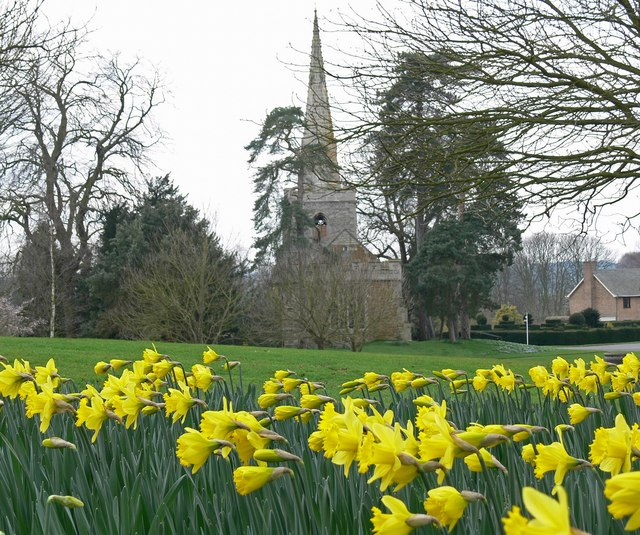
- Church of St Michael and All Angels, Brooksby
- Denomination: Church of England

History
- Dedication: St Michael, All Angels

Administration
- Diocese: Leicester
- Archdeaconry: Leicester
- Parish: Brooksby, Leicestershire

Clergy
- Rector: David Harknett

The Church of St Michael and All Angels is a church in Brooksby, Leicestershire. It is a Grade II* listed building.

== History ==
The church lies within the grounds of Brooksby Hall. The church consists of a tower, chancel and nave. The tower was built in the 14th century and has battlements, a frieze and a spire. The rest of the church is from the Perpendicular period and late Tudor period.

The church was restored R. W. Johnson in 1879. The chancel has a slab to Henry Villiers (died 1481) and his wife.
