= Sileby railway station =

Railway station in Leicestershire, England

Coordinates: 52°43′52.42″N 1°6′34.42″W

Sileby
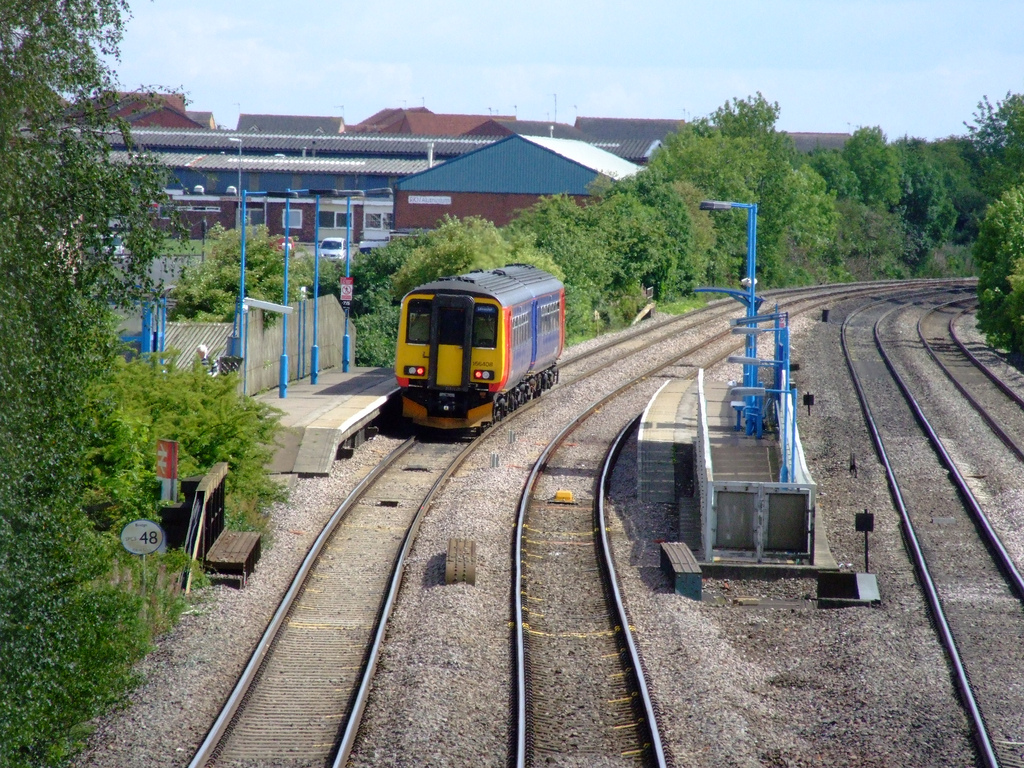

General information
- Location: Sileby, Charnwood; England
- Grid reference: SK602151
- Managed by: East Midlands Railway
- Platforms: 2
- Tracks: 4

Other information
- Station code: SIL
- Classification: DfT category F2

Key dates
- 1840: Opened
- 4 March 1968: Closed
- 27 May 1994: Reopened

Passengers
- 2020/21: ▼28,462
- 2021/22: ▲72,410
- 2022/23: ▲0.109 million
- 2023/24: ▲0.134 million
- 2024/25: ▲0.153 million
Location
Notes
- Passenger statistics from the Office of Rail and Road

Sileby railway station serves the industrial village of Sileby in Leicestershire, England. The station is located on the Midland Main Line, 106 miles 50 chains (171.6 km) north of London St Pancras.

== History ==
The original station was built in 1840 for the Midland Counties Railway, which in 1844 joined the North Midland Railway and the Birmingham and Derby Junction Railway in forming the Midland Railway.

The line cut the village in two, the halves subsequently being connected by a substantial stone bridge.

There were complaints from local residents about the facilities provided at the station. In 1897 the parish council was petitioning the company for improvements, but the Midland Railway company was resistant. By 1910 the council raised a petition to the company to resolve five issues:

- The dangerous level crossing, of which it was stated that several accidents had been narrowly avoided;
- The need of better accommodation for vehicular traffic – for the number of vehicles using the station had increased, and blocking of the road (especially by milk carts) was a danger as well as an inconvenience;
- The want of a comfortable waiting room on the up platform, where there was only an open shelter with no provision for a fire in cold weather;
- The lowness of the platforms, which was thought to be the cause of a passenger suffering a fractured ankle when alighting from a train;
- The need for an entrance from Brook Street.

This time the council was more successful, for early in 1912 it received a letter from the Midland Railway confirming the improvements that would be made:

- Access from King Street to the up platform without passengers having to cross the running lines;
- Improved vehicular access to the station;
- The additional waiting room;
- Raising and lengthening the platforms;
- Footpath access from Brook Street.

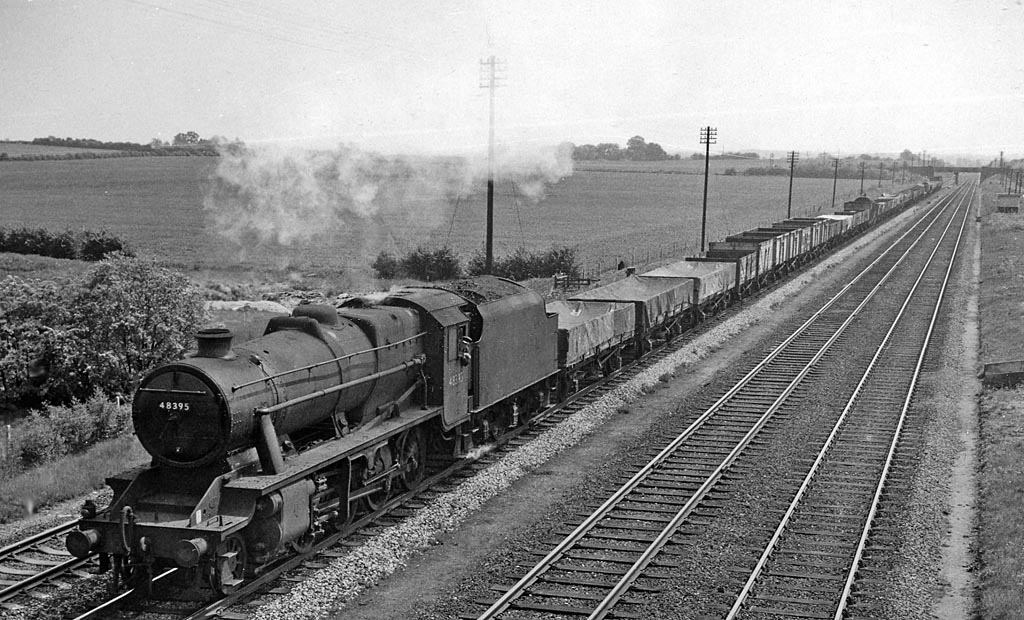
Down empties south of Sileby in 1962

The platform structures were of timber construction, and very little remains of the original station apart from the station house.

It reopened on 27 May 1994 as part of phase one of the Ivanhoe Line.

== Facilities ==
The station is unstaffed and facilities are limited, although there are shelters on both platforms and a self-service ticket machine for ticket purchases.

Step-free access is not available to either of the platforms at the station.

== Services ==
All services at Sileby are operated by East Midlands Railway using Class 158 and 170 DMUs.

The typical off-peak service in trains per hour is:

- 1 tph to Leicester
- 1 tph to Nottingham

Fast trains on the Midland Main Line pass by the station but do not stop.

The station is closed on Sundays.

Preceding station	National Rail	Following station
Syston	East Midlands Railway Ivanhoe Line; Monday-Saturday only	Barrow-upon-Soar
