= Frank Goadby =

British Army officer (1899–1985)

Brigadier Frank Goadby, OBE
- Born: 1899; Reading, Berkshire
- Died: 1985 (aged 85–86)
- Allegiance: United Kingdom
- Branch: (United Kingdom) British Army (1917-1926, 1947-1949) (British Raj) British Indian Army (1926-1947)
- Service years: 1917-1949
- Rank: Brigadier
- Conflicts: Waziristan campaign Second World War
- Awards: Officer of the Order of the British Empire

Brigadier Franz Reginald Lindsay "Frank" Goadby OBE (1899–1985) was a British Army and British Indian Army officer.

After training at Royal Military College, Sandhurst, he was commissioned into the Royal Engineers, though he transferred to the Royal Corps of Signals in 1920. Goadby served much of his early career in India, including during the Waziristan campaign in the early 1920s, his actions in which were recognised by appointment as a Member of the Order of the British Empire.

Goadby transferred to the British Indian Army in 1926, in the rank of captain, and served with the 3rd Sikh Pioneers and 6th Rajputana Rifles. During the Second World War he served in the Burma campaign, for which he was twice mentioned in despatches. Upon Indian independence in 1947, Goadby became the last British senior officer to hold a position in Calcutta and the last British commander of Bombay.

Goadby retired in 1949, after which he lived in a 400-year-old mill at Standlake, Oxfordshire. He held many voluntary positions, including as treasurer of the local football club, president of the youth centre, manager of the Nuffield Orthopaedic Centre and president of the Oxford branch of the Burma Star Association. He had a long association with the Royal British Legion, serving as chairman and then president of their Oxfordshire branch from 1953 until 1977. Goadby was deputy lieutenant of Oxfordshire from 1964. A keen local historian, he wrote a history of Standlake church that was published in 1965. Upon his death, his papers were split among a number of archives.

== Early life and British Army ==
Goadby was born in Reading, Berkshire, in 1899; his father was a dentist. As a child he had an interest in nature, particularly in collecting wildflowers.

Goadby attended the Royal Military Academy Sandhurst from 1917 and whilst there was known as the "gardener-in-chief" because of his fascination with flowers. After passing out he was appointed a second lieutenant in the Royal Engineers on 20 September 1918. By 1919, the same year he married Kathleen Mary Clark, Goadby was serving in British India.

He was promoted to lieutenant on 20 March 1920 and transferred to the Royal Corps of Signals in that rank on 7 January 1921. Goadby served in the Waziristan campaign against rebel tribes during 1922 and 1923 and, on 20 May 1924, was appointed a Member of the Order of the British Empire in recognition of this.

== British Indian Army ==
Goadby transferred to the British Indian Army in the rank of captain on 1 September 1926, though he was granted seniority in rank from 20 September 1924. He served initially with the 2nd battalion of the 3rd Sikh Pioneers. One of his duties in India was to review routes used by the British armed forces, which involved walking hundreds of miles at high altitudes.

In 1933 he transferred to the 1st battalion of the 6th Rajputana Rifles as staff captain. Goadby was appointed brigade major on 2 September 1935 and promoted to the rank of major on 20 September 1936. His appointment as brigade major ended on 15 June 1937. He later served with Southern Command in Simla, Calcutta, Bihar and Bombay.

Goadby held the temporary rank of lieutenant-colonel by 20 September 1944, when he was promoted to the substantive rank. Goadby served in the Burma campaign and was twice honoured with mentions in despatches for "gallant and distinguished service", on 19 July 1945 and 10 January 1946.

Goadby held the temporary rank of brigadier by the time he was appointed an Officer of the Order of the British Empire on 14 August 1947. India was granted independence as the Dominion of India the following day. Goadby became the last British senior officer to hold a position in Calcutta and the last British commander of Bombay.

Goadby had reverted to the temporary rank of colonel by 20 October 1947, when he was promoted to the substantive rank. He retired from the army on 13 June 1949; on the same date he was granted the honorary rank of brigadier.

== Retirement ==
In retirement Goadby and his wife moved to the 400-year-old Gaunt Mill at Standlake, Oxfordshire. They developed an area of wilderness there into a show garden. Goadby became active in a number of voluntary roles in the local area. He was treasurer of Standlake Football Club, president of Standlake Youth Centre, manager of the Nuffield Orthopaedic Centre in Oxford and president of the Oxford branch of the Burma Star Association. Goadby reckoned that he served on 44 committees but prioritised the Royal British Legion, of whose Oxfordshire branch he became chairman in 1953. Goadby stood down from the role in 1971 to become president of the branch before retiring in 1977.

On 9 April 1964 Goadby was appointed deputy lieutenant of Oxfordshire. At other times he was elected district and county councillor. He was a keen local historian and wrote a history of the parish church at Standlake that was published in 1965 as St. Giles Church, Standlake, Oxon.

Goadby and his wife moved from Gaunt Mill in 1981, entering a Royal British Legion flat in Kidlington. Goadby died in 1985. Goadby's papers were split among a number of archives. Some papers on his work with the Royal British Legion and on local and family history are held by the Oxfordshire History Centre. A collection of printed material is held by the Radcliffe Science Library and John Johnson collection at the Bodleian Library, and other papers are held in the University of Cambridge South Asian Archive.
