= Brooksby College =

College in Leicestershire, England

- Type: FE
- Established: 1951
- Principal: James Fryer
- Location: Melton Mowbray, Leicestershire, England; 52.7383°N 1.0070°W
- Campus: Brooksby Melton Mowbray
- Colours: Green
- Website: www.brooksby.ac.uk

Brooksby College is a further education campus situated on the historic Brooksby estate in Leicestershire, England. Originally established as an independent agricultural institute, the college specialises in land-based, animal care, and vocational educational programmes. As of August 2025, the campus operates as part of the Loughborough College Group, following a series of institutional mergers involving the former SMB College Group. The college administration and several educational facilities are housed within the Grade II* listed Brooksby Hall and its surrounding estate.

== History and origins ==
The Brooksby estate possesses a deep historical lineage, originating as a late 9th-century Danish settlement before being recorded in the 1085 Domesday Book under the purview of Hugh Lupus, Earl of Chester, and his wife, Countess Judith. During the 15th and 16th centuries, the village was heavily depopulated due to enclosures made by Sir John Villiers to profit from the wool trade. For several centuries, the manor was held by the prominent Villiers family; it was the birthplace of George Villiers, 1st Duke of Buckingham, in 1592.

In 1906, David Beatty (later Admiral of the Fleet Earl Beatty) leased the hall, and during the Second World War, the property functioned as a Red Cross convalescent home. The estate officially transitioned into an educational establishment in 1945. In 1950, it was formally renamed the Leicestershire and Rutland Farm Institute. The institute was subsequently renamed Brooksby Agricultural College, reflecting its core curriculum, before eventually being known simply as Brooksby College.

== Mergers and evolution ==
In September 2000, Brooksby College merged with the financially struggling Melton Mowbray College to form Brooksby Melton College. This unification expanded the institution's remit beyond land-based studies to include performing arts, engineering, and social care programmes. In February 2020, the institution merged with Stephenson College to create the SMB College Group, consolidating further education provision across Leicestershire. The most recent structural evolution occurred in August 2025, when the SMB College Group formally merged with Loughborough College to establish the Loughborough College Group.

== Estate, campus and facilities ==
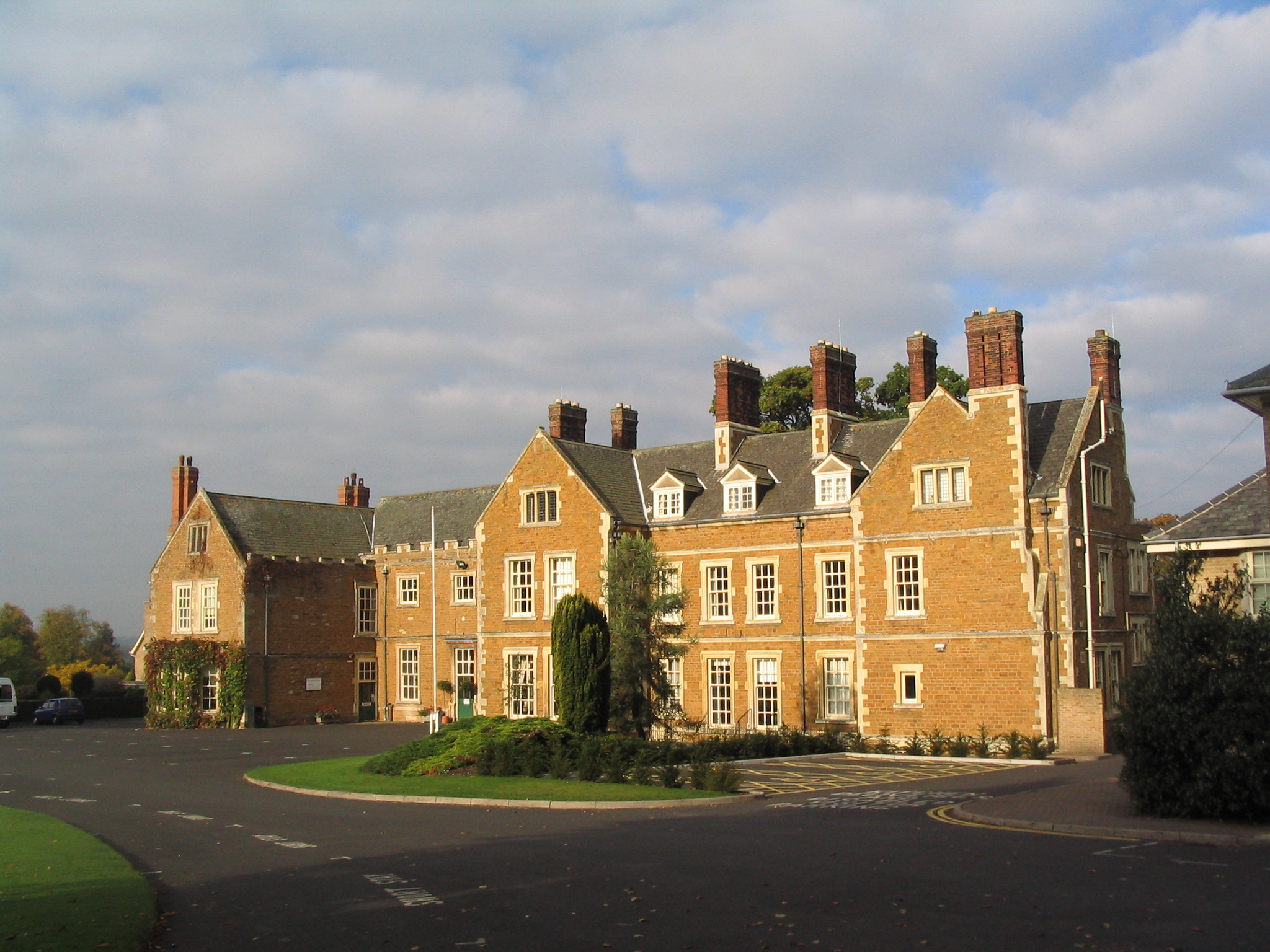
Brooksby Hall

The focal point of the college is Brooksby Hall, a Grade II* listed manor house originally constructed in the late 16th century, later expanded in the late 19th century by Leicester architects R.J. and J. Goodacre. Today, the hall serves as both an administrative centre and a commercial venue.

Beyond the hall, the Brooksby campus occupies an 850-acre working estate dedicated to practical, land-based education. The grounds incorporate a commercial working farm, five acres of formal gardens, and industry-standard agricultural glasshouses. For specific disciplines, the campus houses a £3.6 million sports facility, alongside an Equine Rehabilitation Centre equipped with both indoor and outdoor riding arenas.

== Academic scope and curricula ==
Operating primarily as a specialist land-based campus, Brooksby College's core curricula encompass Agriculture, Horticulture, Countryside Management, Animal Care, and Equine Studies. Beyond its agrarian roots, the campus has diversified its vocational offerings to include Land-based Engineering, Motor Vehicle Technology, Construction, Sport, and Performing Arts.

== Student demographics and pathways ==
The institution serves a highly stratified demographic, offering targeted educational pathways ranging from entry-level skills to degree-level study:

- School Leavers (16–18): Provides vocational diplomas (BTECs) and T Levels, which integrate rigorous classroom study with extended industry placements equivalent to three A-Levels.
- Apprentices: Facilitates workplace-based training with no upper age limit, spanning from Intermediate (Level 2) through to Degree Apprenticeships (Level 6).
- Adult Learners (19+): Offers Dog Grooming Level 2 studied over a 17-week period, and Dog Grooming Level 3 studied over a 34-week period.
- Higher Education (HE): Delivers undergraduate programmes (Levels 4, 5, and 6), including full BSc (Hons) degrees in subjects such as Animal Management, Science and Welfare. These degrees are validated and awarded by partner universities.
- Foundation Learning: Operates Entry Level and Level 1 courses designed specifically for students requiring additional educational support (including SEND). These programmes focus on building life skills to facilitate progression into supported employment or independent living.

== Notable alumni ==
The modern college has produced notable alumni across contemporary sectors. These include television and film actors Adrian Scarborough and Owen Warner, professional rugby union players George Martin and Will Wand, and photographic colouriser Tom Marshall.
