= St James' Church, Ab Kettleby =

Coordinates: 52°47′54.82″N 0°55′38.14″W

St James’ Church, Ab Kettleby
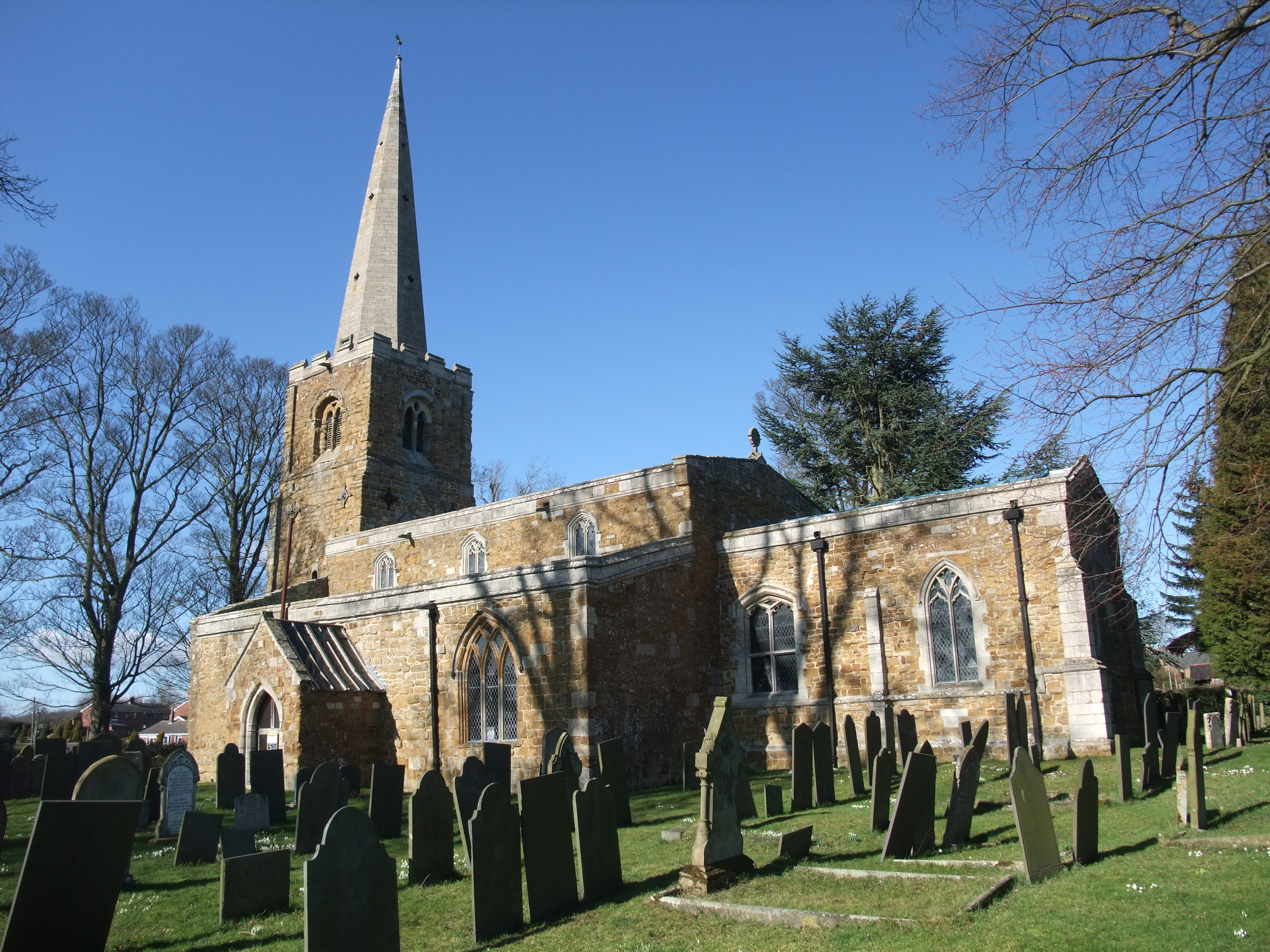
- St James’ Church, Ab Kettleby

- Location within Leicestershire
- OS grid reference: SK 72425 22872
- Location: Ab Kettleby
- Country: England
- Denomination: Church of England

History
- Dedication: James the Greater

Architecture
- Heritage designation: Grade II* listed

Administration
- Diocese: Diocese of Leicester
- Archdeaconry: Leicester
- Deanery: Framland (Melton Mowbray)
- Parish: Ab Kettleby and Holwell

St James’ Church, Ab Kettleby is a Grade II* listed parish church in the Church of England in Ab Kettleby, Leicestershire.

== History ==
The church dates from the 13th century, but was restored between 1852 and 1853 by Broadbent and Hawley when repairs were made and new oak benches were installed.

The remains of a Roman villa, and a ditch running from north to south underneath the nave have caused serious structural problems for the church. The church closed in 2006 due to its structural problems and, following the raising of over £250,000 for repairs, it re-opened in 2013.

== Memorials ==
- Everard Digby, (died 1628)
- Joye Elizabeth, wife of William Neale, (died 1604)
- John Neale (died 1606)
- Christopher Dexter (died 1726)
- Matthew Dexter (died 1728)

== Parish status ==
The church is in a joint parish with St Leonard's Church, Holwell

Together, they form part of a wider benefice which includes

- All Saints' Church, Asfordby
- St Michael, Wartnaby
- St Peter, Saxelbye
- St John the Baptist, Grimston

== Bells ==
The peal of three bells, dating from 1599, 1653 and 1765 was augmented to six in 2015 with the addition of two new bells cast by John Taylor & Co, and a third bell, cast in 1929 and relocated from Gorran Churchtown, Cornwall.
