= Ab Kettleby Manor =

17th-century manor house in Leicestershire, England

Coordinates: 52°48′1.80″N 0°55′42.06″W

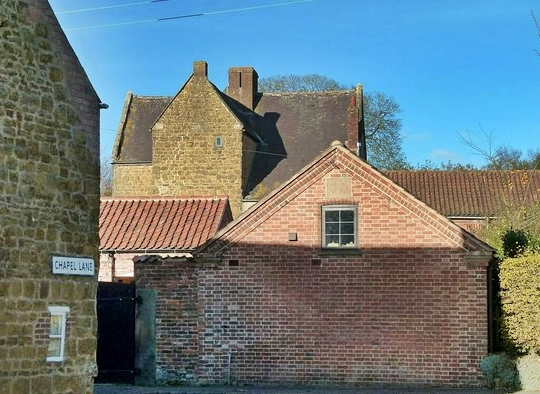
Ab Kettleby Manor House

Ab Kettleby Manor is an early 17th-century house in the village of Ab Kettleby, Leicestershire. Built of ironstone with a central brick chimney the house is cruciform in plan.

== Notes and references ==
=== Sources ===
- Pevsner, Nikolaus (1960). The Buildings of England: Leicestershire and Rutland (Harmondsworth: Penguin Books)
