= Goadby Marwood =

Village in Leicestershire, England

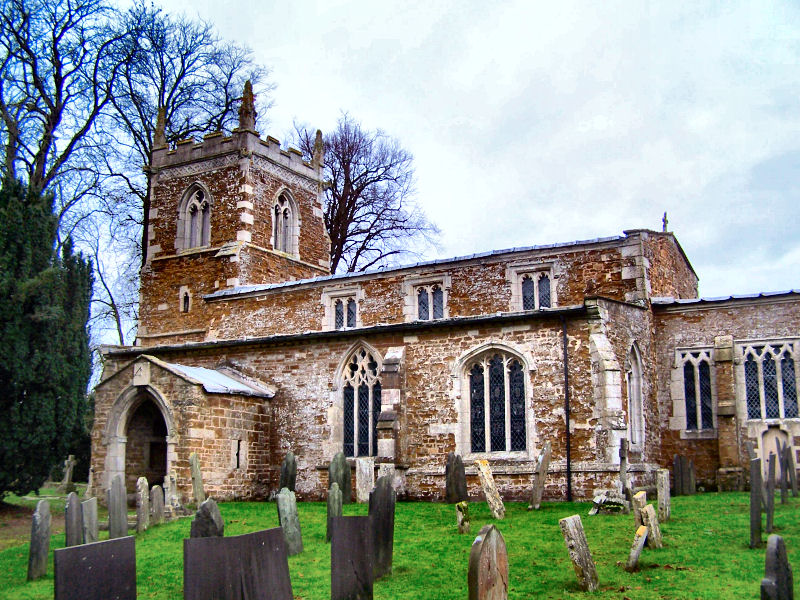
- St. Denys parish church

- Location within Leicestershire
- Civil parish: Eaton
- District: Melton
- Shire county: Leicestershire
- Region: East Midlands
- Country: England
- Sovereign state: United Kingdom
- Post town: Melton Mowbray
- Postcode district: LE14
- Police: Leicestershire
- Fire: Leicestershire
- Ambulance: East Midlands
- UK Parliament: Melton and Syston

Goadby Marwood is a village and former civil parish, now in the parish of Eaton, in the Melton district, in the north of the English county of Leicestershire. It is about 6 miles (10 km) north of Melton Mowbray and a few miles from the Vale of Belvoir. In 1931 the parish had a population of 144.

== History ==
Most of the houses are built from locally mined ironstone and some, including Goadby Hall, date from the 17th century. There is only one primary road into, and out of, the village. Goadby Marwood has no public house, shop or post office. The village's name means 'farm/settlement of Gauti'. In 1247, the village was held by Gaufridus Maureward.

On 1 April 1936 the parish was abolished and merged with Eaton.

== Wycomb villa ==
In the 1950s the remains of a Roman villa were discovered in a field on the ridge of a hill overlooking the village. Named the "Wycomb Villa" it was field-walked in 1979, 1981 and 1985 and numerous tesserae were found. In 2002 a resistivity survey showed the position of the villa walls. Excavations in 2003 and 2004 found pottery fragments, part of a mortarium, a number of wall foundations, and building debris. One room was found to have a hypocaust, and a small area of complete mosaic was uncovered. The mosaic was tentatively dated to the fourth century, and other finds indicated that the site as a whole had been occupied from the late first century.
