= Brooksby Hall =

Manor house to the northeast of Leicester, England

Coordinates: 52.7380°N 1.0074°W

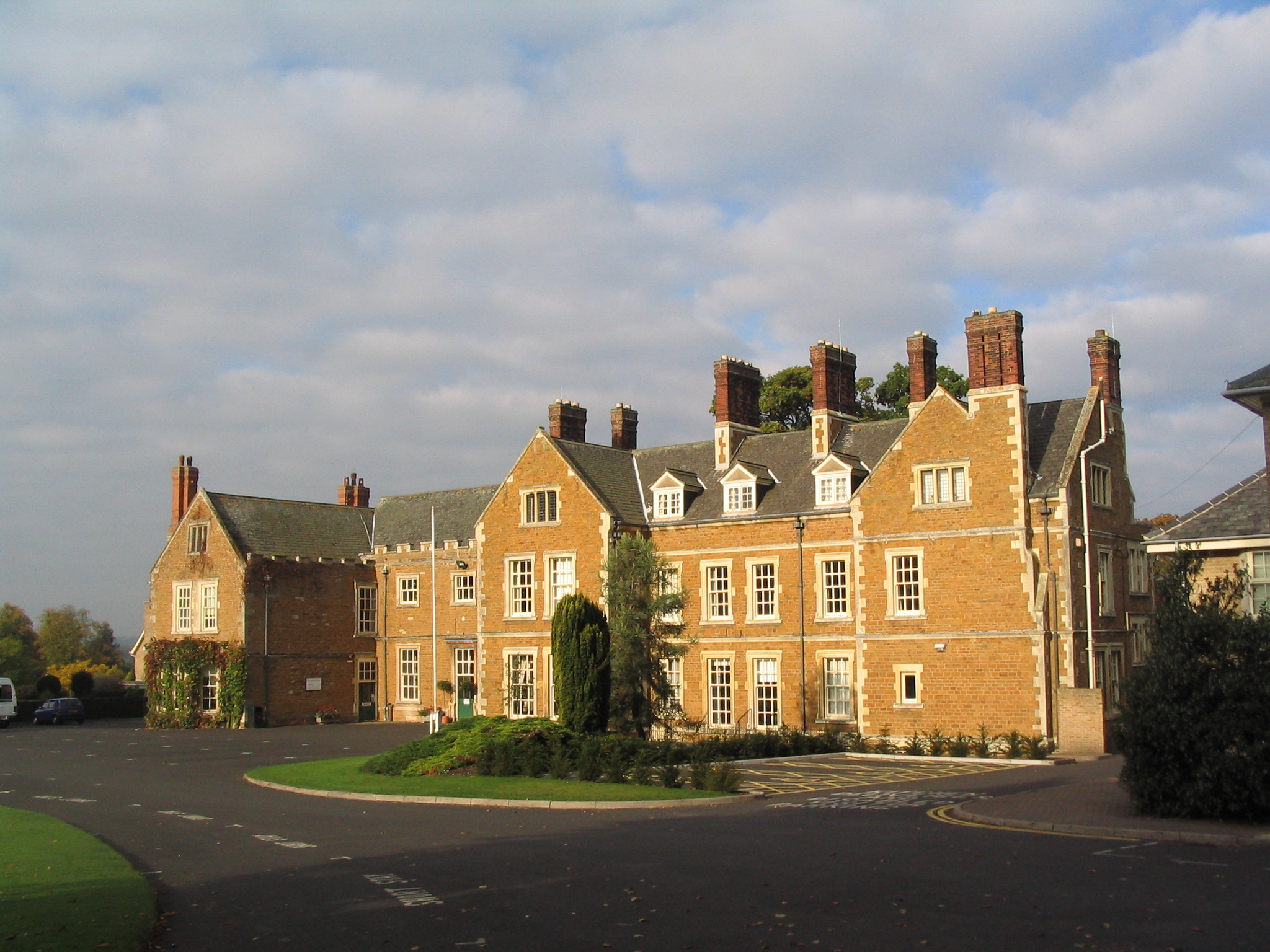
Brooksby Hall

Brooksby Hall is a late–16th-century manor house on 3.2 square kilometres (800 acres) of land between Leicester and Melton Mowbray. Situated 13 kilometres (8.1 mi) northeast of Leicester, the hall and the neighbouring church of St Michael and All Angels are the last remnants of the medieval village of Brooksby, which was founded during the period of the Danelaw in the 9th century AD. In the 15th and 16th centuries Brooksby was depopulated by enclosures carried out by the estate's owners, which turned its cultivated land into sheep pastures in order to profit from a boom in wool.

A 31-acre garden adjoins the hall, leading down to the River Wreake and the railway line from Leicester to Peterborough. The hall, which is Grade II* listed, was occupied for centuries by the Villiers family and later by Admiral David Beatty, the British commander at the Battle of Jutland in 1916. It is now part of the Brooksby Melton College and is also used as a wedding and conference venue.

== Architecture ==
A manor house has probably stood at Brooksby since at least the 13th century, but the core of the present hall dates to the Jacobean era in the late 16th century. It was extensively remodelled in 1890–91, and further changes were made in 1911. After it became an agricultural college in 1951, a set of college and residential buildings were constructed next to the hall. Further teaching blocks and a hostel were constructed in 1970–72, on the site of the hall's old coach house.

Brooksby Hall is built on an H-shaped plan. It was constructed from coursed squared ironstone dressed with limestone, with roofs covered with Swithland slate. The building's main front faces south, away from the river, with a facade that has five bays and one and a half storeys faced with sash windows and a parapet with crenelations. The 1890–91 extension on the east side of the original part of the hall mimics the same style but adds a series of tall chimney stacks and mullioned windows in the gables. The hall-cum-drawing room was redesigned by Lutyens in 1911 in an imitation early Georgian style, with enriched panelling and an overmantel with a pediment. Elsewhere in the house, some of the panelling is said to have come from Admiral Beatty's flagship.

== History ==
=== Establishment and ownership by the Villiers family ===
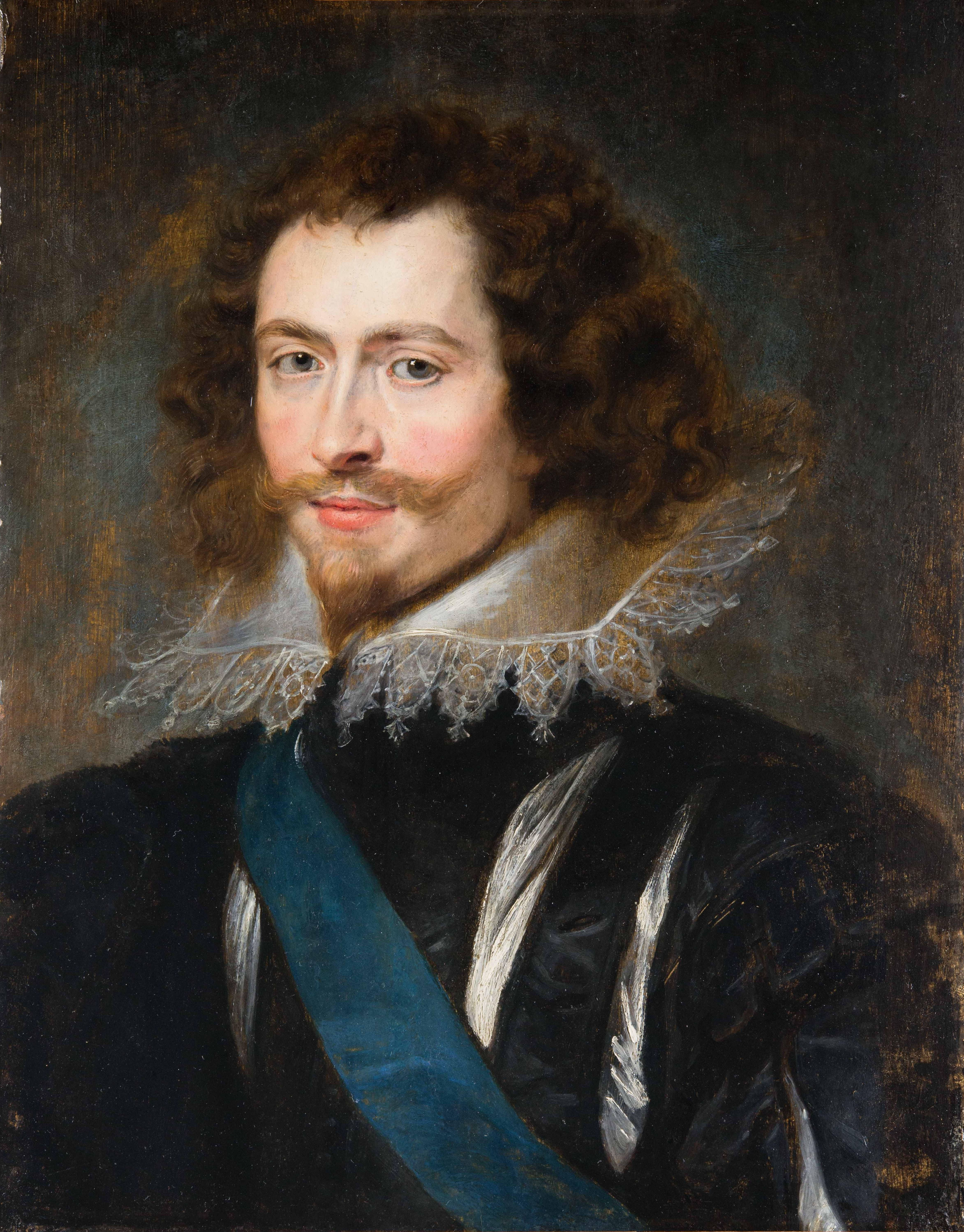
The most famous inhabitant of Brooksby Hall, George Villiers, 1st Duke of Buckingham, was born there in 1592.

The name Brooksby, recorded in Domesday Book as Brochesbi, derives from the Old English brochi, "badger", and perhaps indicates that the area was once noted for its badger population. It was held by Hugh d'Avranches after the Norman Conquest of England in 1066. In the early 13th century the tenant of Brooksby, Gilbert de Seis, married a member of the Villiers family, a line of minor gentry of Norman descent. The estate remained in Villiers hands for the next 500 years. At this time, Brooksby consisted of the hall, the nearby Church of St Michael and All Angels, a small number of peasants' houses and a field system with common land.

Over the next couple of hundred years, the village gradually became almost entirely depopulated. The Black Death of 1348–49 probably played a part, but its final extinction came about through a programme of enclosure carried out by the Villiers. The arable common land was fenced off and turned into more profitable sheep pastures, at the cost of the residents losing their homes and livelihoods. Sir John Villiers is recorded to have enclosed four farms on the estate on a single day, 6 December 1492, fencing off 160 acres and forcing 24 people to leave their homes and occupations. This was probably neither the first nor the last act of enclosure on the estate and by the mid-16th century the manor had probably been entirely enclosed and the village depopulated. In 1603 an ecclesiastical return records that "the patrone of Brokesbie [was] but one entire household within the said [parish] is Villiers, Esq." The same process of enclosure took place throughout the English Midlands, depopulating dozens of villages. A few traces of the village can still be seen to the south of the church in the form of a house platform and some fragmentary enclosures and mounds.

With the villagers gone, the Villiers family prospered from the lucrative wool trade. Sir George Villiers was father of George Villiers, one of the closest confidantes – according to some, the lover – of King James I and advisor to Charles I. He was made Duke of Buckingham and Lord High Admiral, becoming the highest-ranking non-royal subject in the country before his assassination in 1628. The last baronet, Sir William Villiers, 3rd Baronet, died without issue in 1711.

=== After the Villiers ===
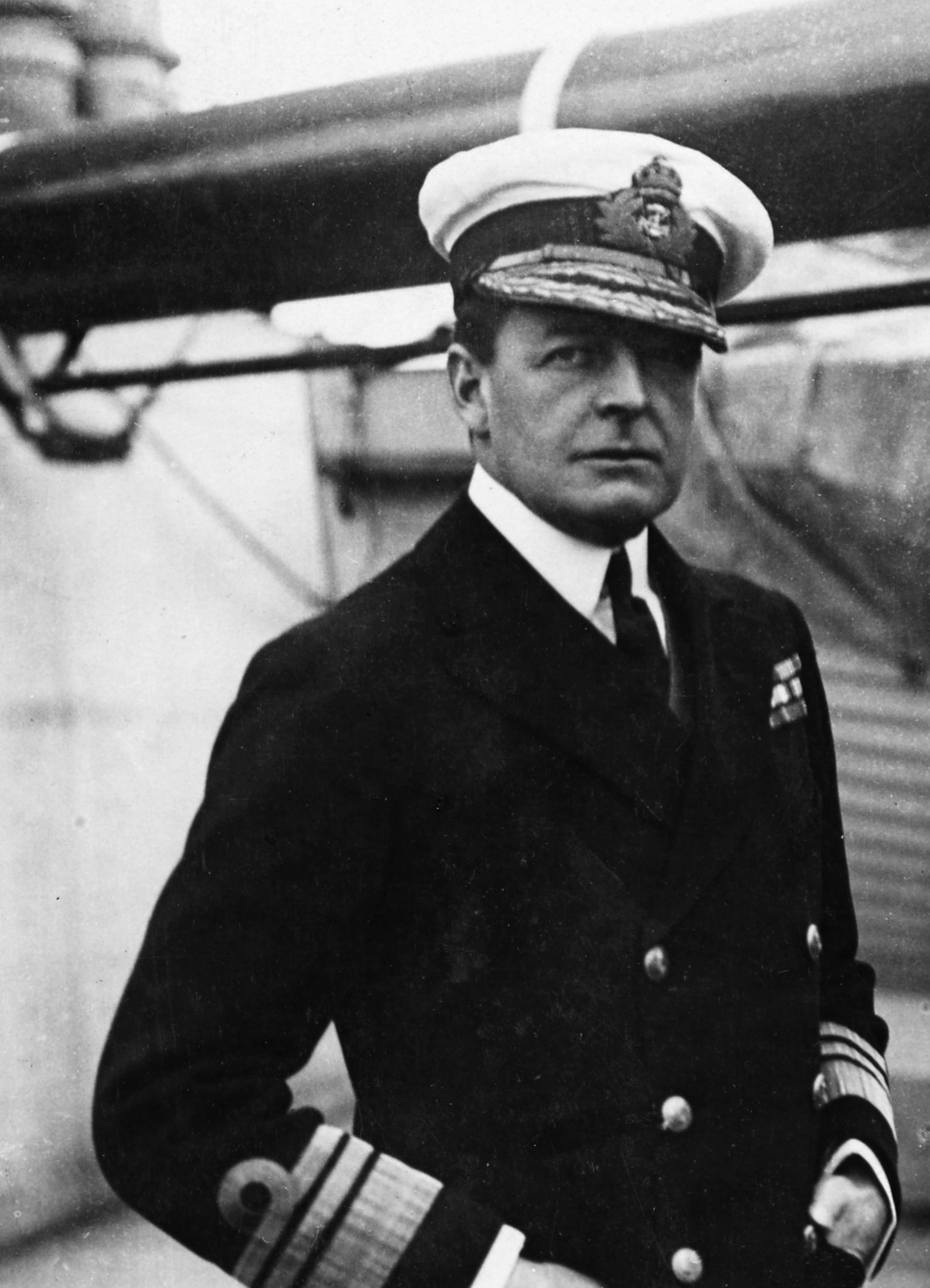
Admiral David Beatty, occupier of Brooksby Hall from 1906–36

With the death of Sir William Villiers the title became extinct and the manor was sold to Sir Nathan Wright, Lord Keeper of the Great Seal. He did not live there and died in 1721. The hall subsequently passed through a series of owners and seems to have been rented out for a while in the late 18th century. In 1830 it passed by marriage to the Wyndhams of Cromer in Norfolk. They used it as a hunting lodge, with a number of illustrious individuals leasing it and the Quorn Hunt meeting there. Lord James Brudenell, later to gain the title of 7th Earl of Cardigan and fame in the Charge of the Light Brigade, leased it and buried his favourite horse, Dandy, under a large elm tree on the lawn in 1831. A memorial to the horse can still be seen on the west wall of the house.

Brooksby Hall was sold to the Charlton family in 1850 but by 1863 it was boarded up and empty. It was purchased two years later by the Chaplin family, who lived there until 1891 when it was purchased by Joseph Grout Williams, a Welsh mining magnate. Although he did not live there, leaving the occupation of the hall to his brother Captain Stanley Williams, he commissioned the Leicester architects R. J. and J. Goodacre to carry out a major expansion and redevelopment. After Stanley Williams' death in a hunting accident, the Duchess of Marlborough leased the hall between 1894–95, and the banker H. T. Barclay also leased it in 1898. In 1904 the estate was advertised for sale, but failed to find a buyer when it was auctioned.

It was subsequently left empty until 1906, when Captain (later Rear Admiral and Earl) Beatty of the Royal Navy and his immensely wealthy American wife, Ethel Field, leased the hall and 0.26 square kilometres (64 acres) from Joseph Grout Williams. He purchased the hall and 0.75 square kilometres (186 acres) for £22,000 in 1911 (£2,240,000 in 2025), and engaged Lutyens to carry out alterations to the interior of the building. Over the next four years he had the gardens extended westwards into the hall's parkland and had a lake and a stone pergola constructed. An ornamental stream was also created around this time, piping water from the slope above the hall to create a series of cascades running through a rockery. Many trees and shrubs were planted, with a number coming from Kew Gardens in London. Beatty also added an unusual reminder of his wartime service by putting a floating sea mine in the lake, though a story that he used to shoot at it for target practice is probably apocryphal.

After the hall was burgled in a jewel robbery in the 1920s, the Beattys preferred to live at their other residence, Dingley Hall near Market Harborough. Ethel Field died in 1932 and three years later Beatty put Brooksby up for sale. Once again it did not sell and Beatty passed the hall to his son David on his death in 1936. In September 1938, when the Munich Agreement was signed, David Beatty decided that the hall should be used as a convalescent home for naval officers if war broke out. On the outbreak of the Second World War a year later this plan was put into effect, but the hall was subsequently opened to all ranks and services under the supervision of the Red Cross. Beatty himself lived in the former gardener's cottage near the church.

=== Post-war usage ===
On 1 June 1945, shortly before the end of the war, Leicester and Rutland County Councils jointly purchased the hall for £20,000 for use as an agricultural training college. It became the Brooksby Hall Training Centre for ex-servicemen, who were to be trained in agricultural methods under the auspices of the Leicestershire Agricultural Executive Committee. It became a Farm Institute in 1950–51, and was converted into an agricultural college in 1961.

While the hall is now used for weddings, conferences and banquets, the rest of the estate forms part of the merged Brooksby Melton College, which serves the county of Leicestershire and delivers a range of vocational courses. The college's administrative offices are housed in the hall.
