= Goadby Hall =

Country house in Goadby Marwood, Leicestershire, England

Coordinates: 52.8298°N 0.8448°W

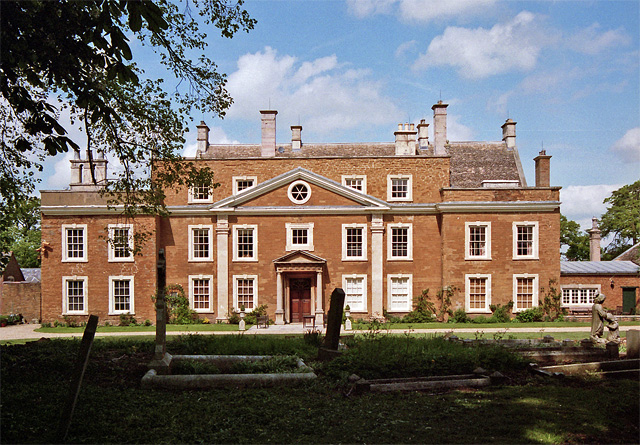
Goadby Hall, 2013

Goadby Hall is a privately owned 17th-century country house located in Towns Lane, Goadby Marwood, Leicestershire. It is an historical Grade II* listed building.

The house was substantially renovated in 1750, when a new south front was built in the Palladian style. Five recessed central bays extend to two storeys with attics, the central three bays of which are pedimented with Doric order columns. Two flanking wings of two storeys have two bays each. The plainer north front has three storeys and seven bays. A large service wing adjoins to the west. A nearby stable block has Grade II listed status.

The 180-acre (0.7 km2) estate was a subsidiary holding of the Duke of Rutland, and the property was often the residence of junior members of the Manners family. Lady Elizabeth Manners, daughter of the 4th Duke, married Richard Norman MP in 1798. Their son, George Norman, inherited the estate and hall from his cousin, the 7th Duke.
