= Brooksby =

Village in Leicestershire, England

Coordinates: 52.738°N 1.006°W

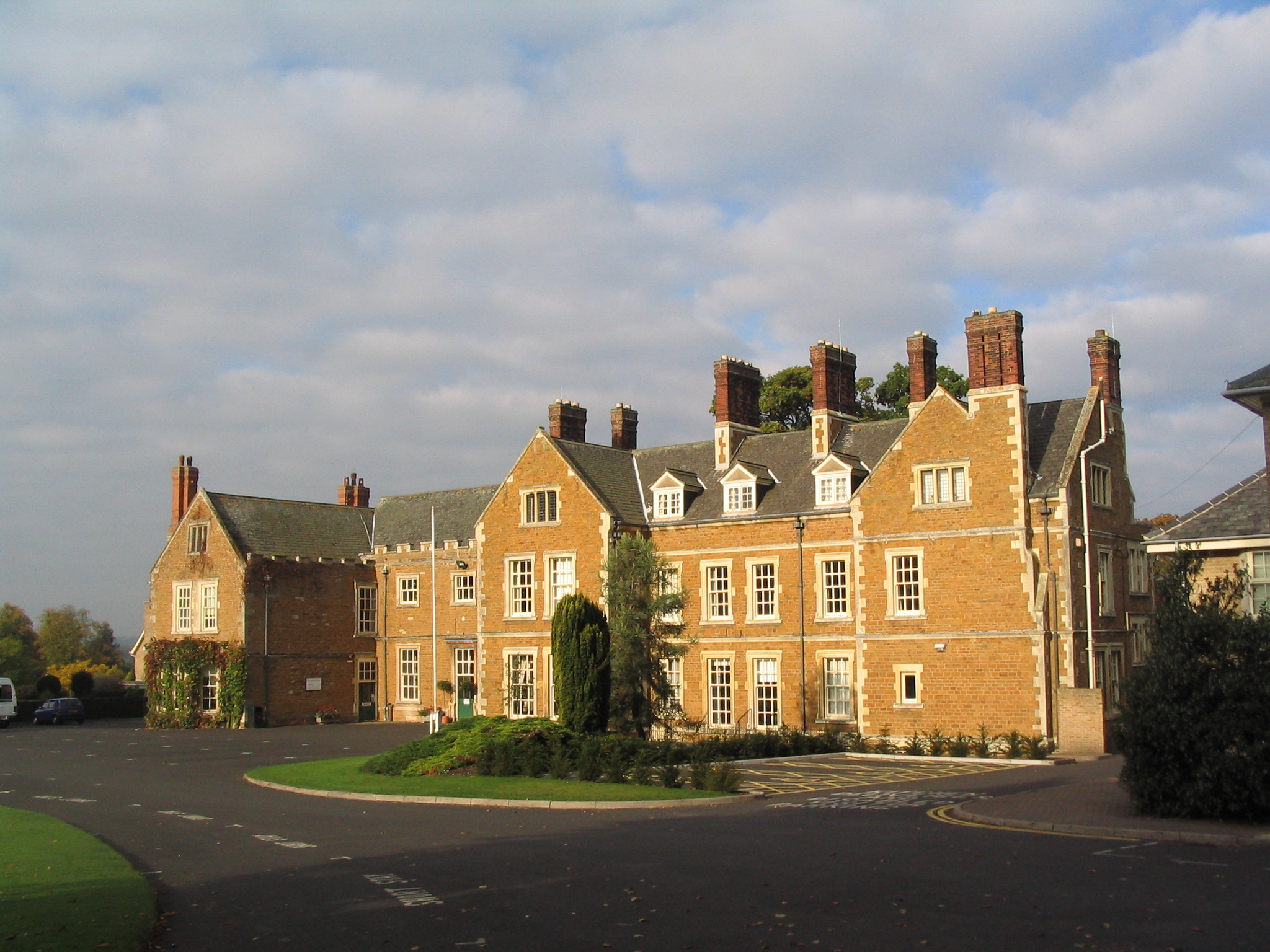
- Brooksby Hall

- Location within Leicestershire
- OS grid reference: SK6716
- Civil parish: Hoby with Rotherby
- District: Melton
- Shire county: Leicestershire
- Region: East Midlands
- Country: England
- Sovereign state: United Kingdom
- Post town: MELTON MOWBRAY
- Postcode district: LE14
- Dialling code: 01664
- Police: Leicestershire
- Fire: Leicestershire
- Ambulance: East Midlands
- UK Parliament: Melton and Syston

Brooksby was a deserted village and former civil parish, now in the parish of Hoby with Rotherby, in the Melton district of Leicestershire, England. It was the ancestral home of the Villiers family. Brooksby and surrounding villages were served by Brooksby railway station. In 1931 the parish had a population of 69.

The name 'Brooksby' means 'farm/settlement of Brok' or 'farm/settlement with a brook'.

On 1 April 1936 the parish was abolished to form Hoby with Rotherby.

Brooksby Hall, a 16th-century manor house, and the Church of St Michael and All Angels, Brooksby, are all that remains of a village that was cleared to enable sheep to be grazed. The church was once the living for Henry Gregg who was married to the writer Mary Kirby. Today the hall has conference and banqueting facilities. Brooksby Melton College offers apprenticeships and further education training courses in animal care, countryside, equine, fisheries, and land based service engineering. As of 2022 Bloor Homes constructed Brooksby Spinney, a new development of luxury modern housing.
