= Hoby with Rotherby =

Civil parish in Leicestershire, England

Coordinates: 52°45′N 1°01′W

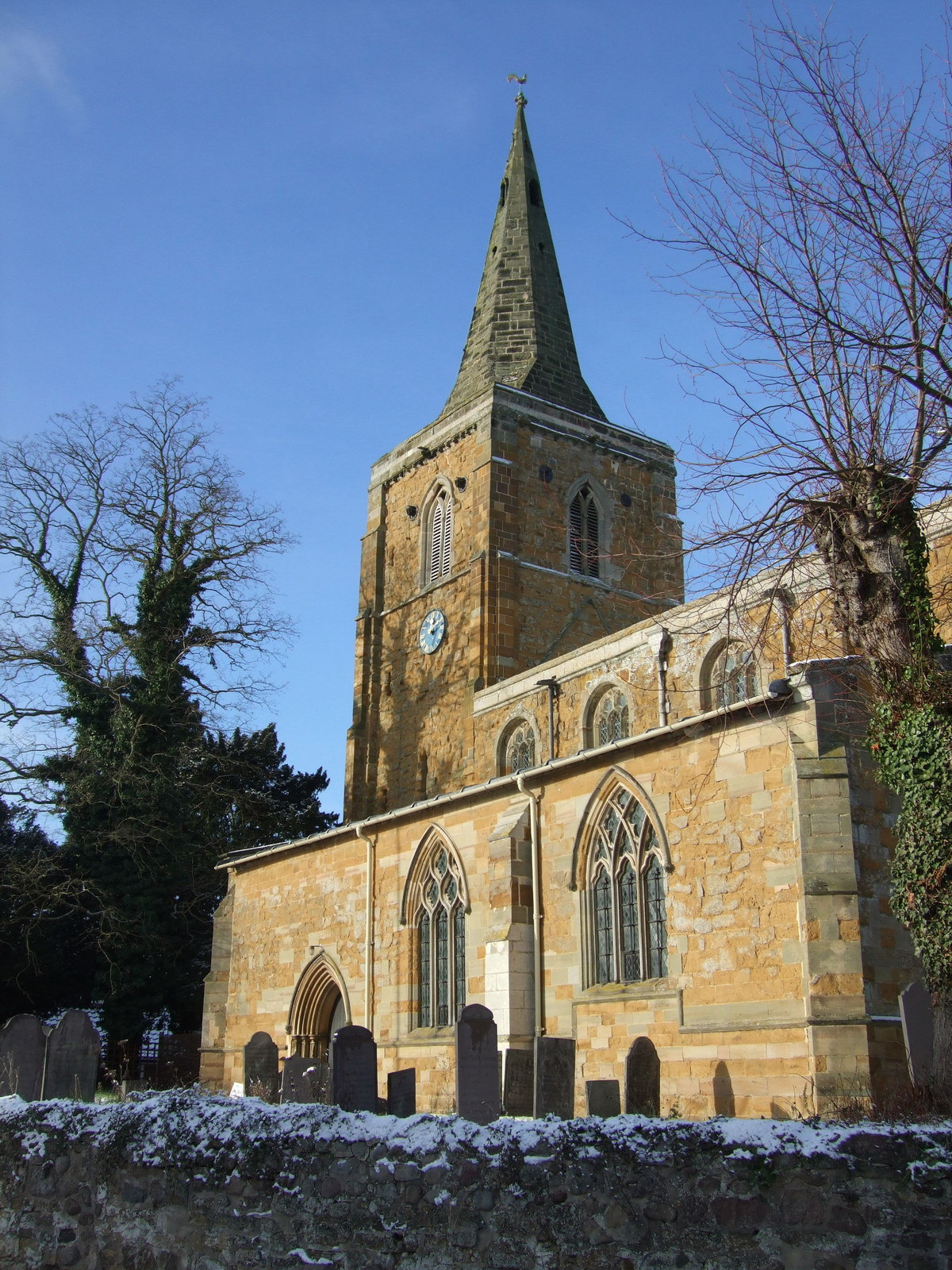
- All Saints church

- Location within Leicestershire
- Population: 556 (2011 census)
- Civil parish: Hoby with Rotherby
- District: Melton
- Shire county: Leicestershire
- Region: East Midlands
- Country: England
- Sovereign state: United Kingdom
- Post town: Melton Mowbray
- Postcode district: LE14
- UK Parliament: Melton and Syston

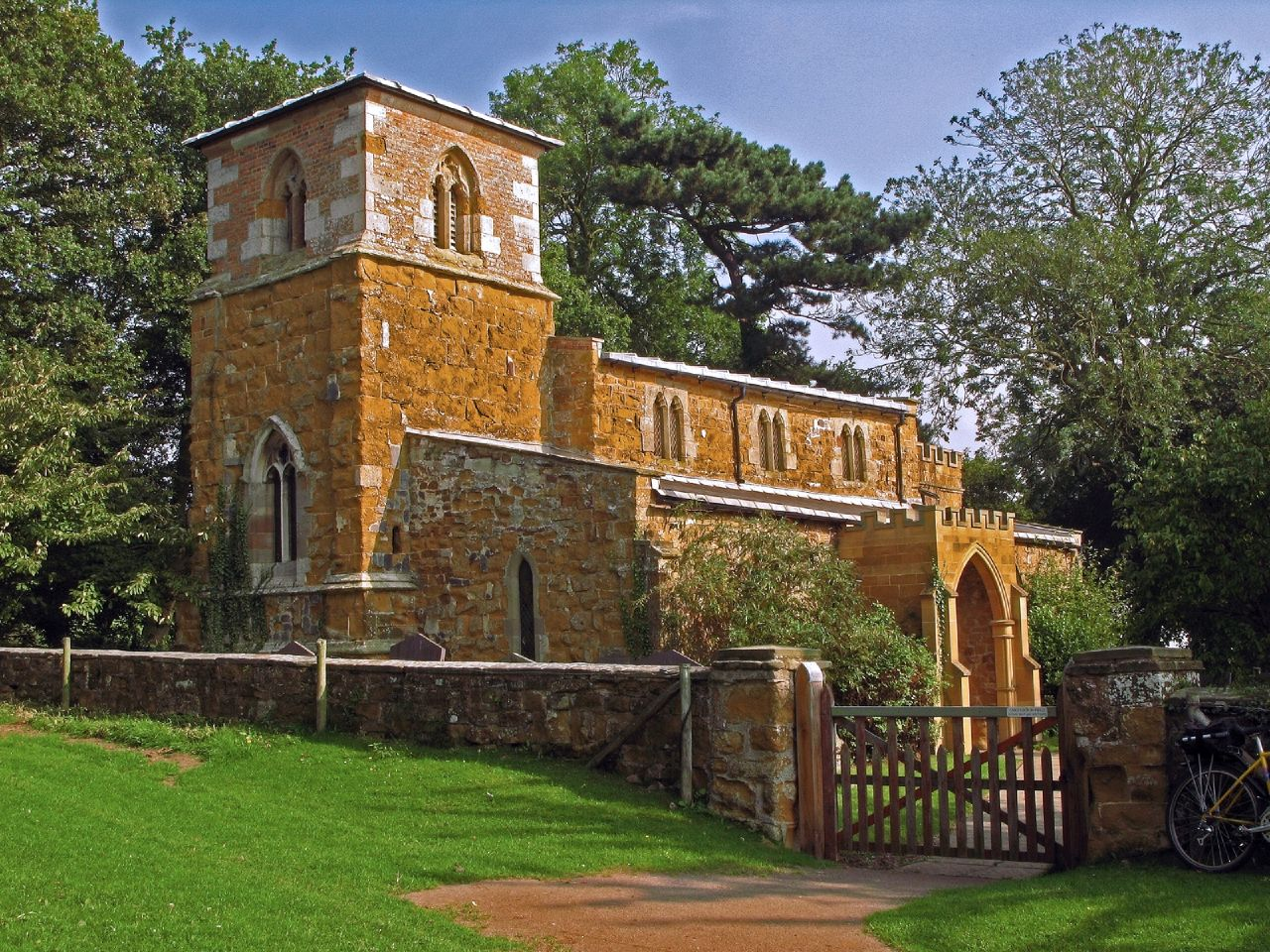
The ironstone church at Ragdale

Hoby with Rotherby is a civil parish in Leicestershire, England. In the 2001 census it had a population of 594, reducing to 556 at the time of the 2011 census. It includes the villages of Hoby, Rotherby, Ragdale and Brooksby. The parish is part of Melton local government district, and within the Melton and Syston constituency. There is a Parish Council for Hoby with Rotherby that manages the area. It meets six times a year and the meetings are open to the public.

Hoby Church All Saints, located on a slight hill overlooking the Wreake Valley, has a west tower with recessed spire, north and south aisles, a nave and a chancel. The tower has a 13th-century base with a later spire added probably in the 14th century, at the same time as the clerestory. The remaining parts of the church date to the 13th century, but there is also some Victorian restoration work in the chancel. The church has been a Grade I listed building since January 1968.

== Toponymy ==
The name 'Hoby' derives from the Old Norse for 'farm/settlement on a hill spur'.

The name 'Rotherby' means 'farm/settlement of Hreitharr'.

The name 'Ragdale' means 'throat valley' probably suggesting that the valley was narrow, like a throat.

== Notable people ==
Racehorse trainer Jenny Pitman was born in Hoby.
