= Melton Borough Council elections =

Local government elections in Leicestershire, England

Melton Borough Council elections are held every four years. Melton Borough Council is the local authority for the non-metropolitan district of Melton in Leicestershire, England. Since the last boundary changes in 2003, 28 councillors have been elected from 16 wards.

== Council elections ==
- 1973 Melton Borough Council election
- 1976 Melton Borough Council election
- 1979 Melton Borough Council election (New ward boundaries)
- 1983 Melton Borough Council election
- 1987 Melton Borough Council election (Borough boundary changes took place but the number of seats remained the same)
- 1991 Melton Borough Council election
- 1995 Melton Borough Council election
- 1999 Melton Borough Council election
- 2003 Melton Borough Council election (New ward boundaries)
- 2007 Melton Borough Council election
- 2011 Melton Borough Council election
- 2015 Melton Borough Council election
- 2019 Melton Borough Council election
- 2023 Melton Borough Council election

== Election results ==
	Overall control	Conservative	Labour	Green	Liberal Democrats	Independent
2023	NOC	11	5	1	1	10
2019	Conservative	22	-	1		5
2015	Conservative	26	-	-		2
2011	Conservative	19	7	-		2
2007	Conservative	20	3	-		5
2003	Conservative	19	4	-		5

== Results maps ==
2003 results map

2007 results map

2011 results map

2015 results map

2019 results map

2023 results map

== By-election results ==
=== 2003-2007 ===
Melton Sysonby By-Election 11 March 2004
Party	Candidate	Votes	%	±%
Conservative		361	45.9	−6.5
Labour		238	30.2	−0.2
Independent		188	23.9	+23.9
Majority		123	15.6	
Turnout		787		
Conservative hold		Swing		

Melton Craven By-Election 26 August 2004
Party	Candidate	Votes	%	±%
Independent		304	43.9	+43.9
Conservative		251	36.3	+17.3
Labour		137	19.8	+3.8
Majority		53	7.7	
Turnout		692		
Independent hold		Swing		

Melton Dorian By-Election 26 August 2004
Party	Candidate	Votes	%	±%
Conservative		397	60.0	+27.2
Labour		140	21.1	−2.8
Independent		125	18.9	+18.9
Majority		257	38.8	
Turnout		662		

=== 2007-2011 ===
Melton Egerton By-Election 4 September 2008
Party	Candidate	Votes	%	±%
Labour		314	43.2	−4.8
BNP		236	32.5	+4.5
Conservative		177	24.3	+0.2
Majority		78	10.7	
Turnout		727		
Labour hold		Swing		

Long Clawson and Stathern By-Election 26 March 2009
Party	Candidate	Votes	%	±%
Conservative		463	50.7	−6.9
Independent		231	25.3	+25.3
BNP		120	13.1	+13.1
Labour		100	10.9	+10.9
Majority		232	25.4	
Turnout		914		
Conservative hold		Swing		

=== 2011-2015 ===
Frisby-on-the-Wreake By-Election 15 December 2011
Party	Candidate	Votes	%	±%
Independent	Edward Hutchinson	212	38.5	+38.5
Conservative	Leigh Higgins	187	34.0	−37.0
Labour	Shaheer Mohammed	89	16.2	−12.8
Independent	Mark Twittey	62	11.3	+11.3
Majority		25	4.5	
Turnout		550		
Independent gain from Conservative		Swing		

Melton Egerton By-Election 15 November 2012
Party	Candidate	Votes	%	±%
Independent	Mark Twittey	253	43.8	+43.8
Labour	Mike Brown	232	40.2	−0.3
Conservative	Paul Phizacklea	92	15.9	−17.4
Majority		21	3.6	
Turnout		577		
Independent gain from Labour		Swing		

Asfordby By-Election 27 November 2014
Party	Candidate	Votes	%	±%
Conservative	Ronnie de Burle	265	54.3	+16.2
Labour	Michael Blase	129	26.4	−7.7
UKIP	Sacha Barnes	94	19.3	+19.3
Majority		136	27.9	
Turnout		488		
Conservative gain from Labour		Swing		

=== 2015-2019 ===
Melton Egerton By-Election 5 May 2016
Party	Candidate	Votes	%	±%
Labour	Michael Blase	255	38.7	+7.2
Conservative	Maddie Smith	158	24.0	−11.0
UKIP	John Scutter	136	20.6	+20.6
Independent	Marilyn Gordon	70	10.6	+10.6
Independent	Andrea Lovegrove	40	6.1	+6.1
Majority		97	14.7	
Turnout		659		
Labour gain from Conservative		Swing		

Melton Egerton By-Election 4 May 2017
Party	Candidate	Votes	%	±%
Conservative	Peter Faulkner	356	52.7	+17.7
Labour	Mike Brown	320	47.3	+15.8
Majority		36	5.3	
Turnout		676		
Conservative gain from Independent		Swing		

Melton Sysonby By-Election 4 May 2017
Party	Candidate	Votes	%	±%
Conservative	Alison Freer-Jones	799	68.7	+36.2
Labour	Vanessa Jackson	364	31.3	+10.0
Majority		435	37.4	
Turnout		1,163		
Conservative hold		Swing		

=== 2019-2023 ===
Melton Dorian By-Election 11 November 2021
Party	Candidate	Votes	%	±%
Conservative	Timothy Webster	362	56.0	+3.9
Labour	Sarah Cox	284	44.0	+44.0
Majority		78	12.1	
Turnout		646		
Conservative hold		Swing		

Melton Sysonby By-Election 31 March 2022
Party	Candidate	Votes	%	±%
Conservative	Siggy Atherton	396	53.2	+8.3
Liberal Democrats	Jim Adcock	183	24.6	+24.6
Labour	Pip Allnatt	165	22.2	−3.5
Majority		213	28.6	
Turnout		744		
Conservative hold		Swing		

=== 2023-2027 ===
Asfordby By-Election 2 November 2023
Party	Candidate	Votes	%	±%
Labour	Margaret Clay	163	34.1	
Conservative	Chris Gray	123	25.7	
Independent	Peter Faulkner	100	20.9	
Green	Issy Taylor	92	19.2	
Majority		40	8.4	
Turnout		478		
Labour gain from Green		Swing		

Wymondham By-Election 23 May 2024
Party	Candidate	Votes	%	±%
Conservative	David Chubb	233	65.6	−6.1
Independent	Samantha Seaward	122	34.4	+34.4
Majority		111	31.2	
Turnout		355		
Conservative hold		Swing		

Croxton Kerrial By-Election 1 May 2025
Party	Candidate	Votes	%	±%
Conservative	Elaine Holmes	329	52.6	+8.2
Independent	Max Clift	296	47.4	+47.4
Majority		33	5.2	
Turnout		625		
Conservative gain from Independent		Swing		
