= Old Dalby =

Village in Leicestershire, England

Coordinates: 52.807°N 1.001°W

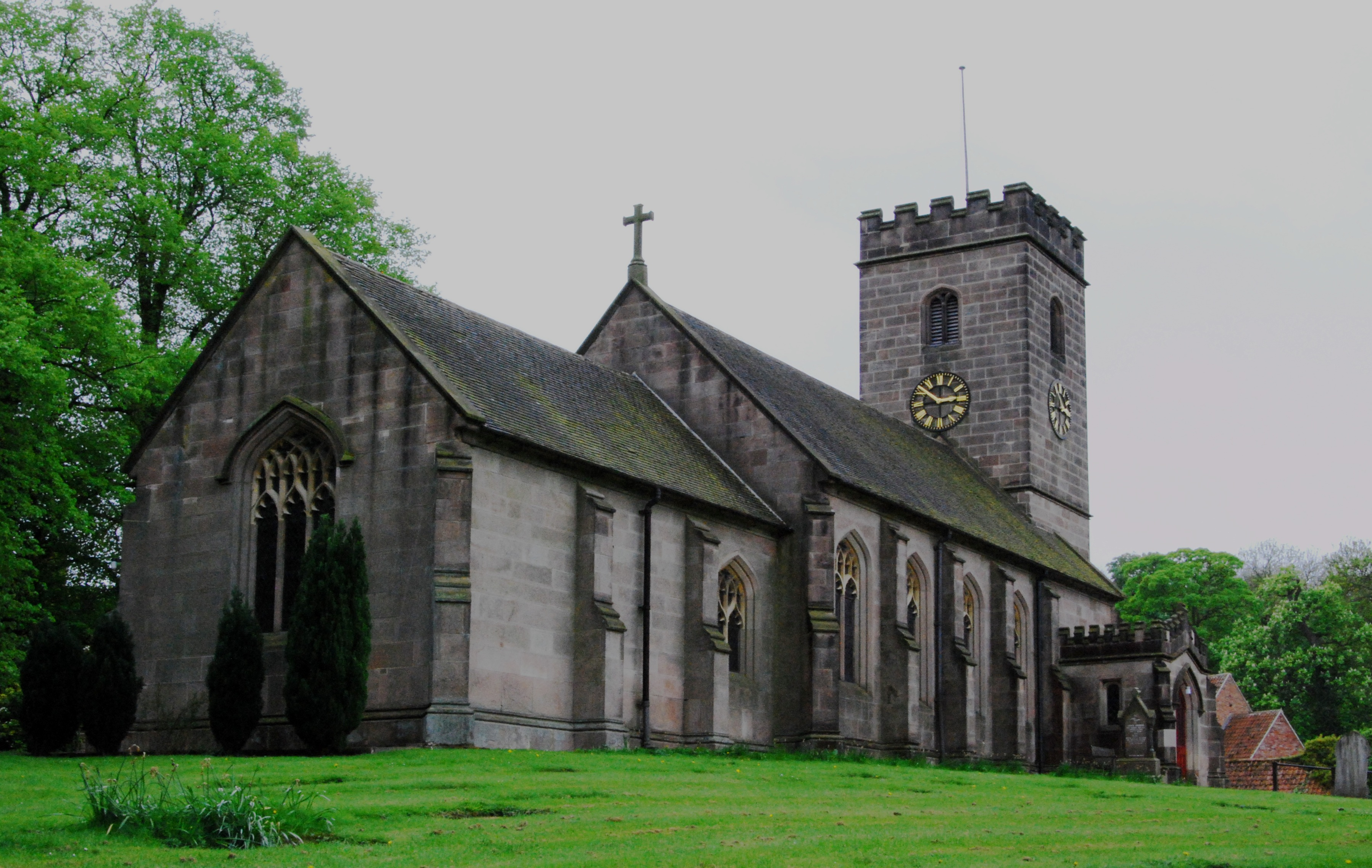
- St John the Baptist

- Location within Leicestershire
- Civil parish: Broughton and Old Dalby
- District: Melton
- Shire county: Leicestershire
- Region: East Midlands
- Country: England
- Sovereign state: United Kingdom
- Post town: MELTON MOWBRAY
- Postcode district: LE14
- Dialling code: 01664

Old Dalby is a village and former civil parish, now in the parish of Broughton and Old Dalby, in the Melton district of Leicestershire, England. It is located to the north-west of Melton Mowbray. It was originally known as "Wold Dalby" or "Dalby on the Wolds". In 1931 the parish had a population of 315. On 1 April 1936 the parish was abolished to form "Broughton and Old Dalby".

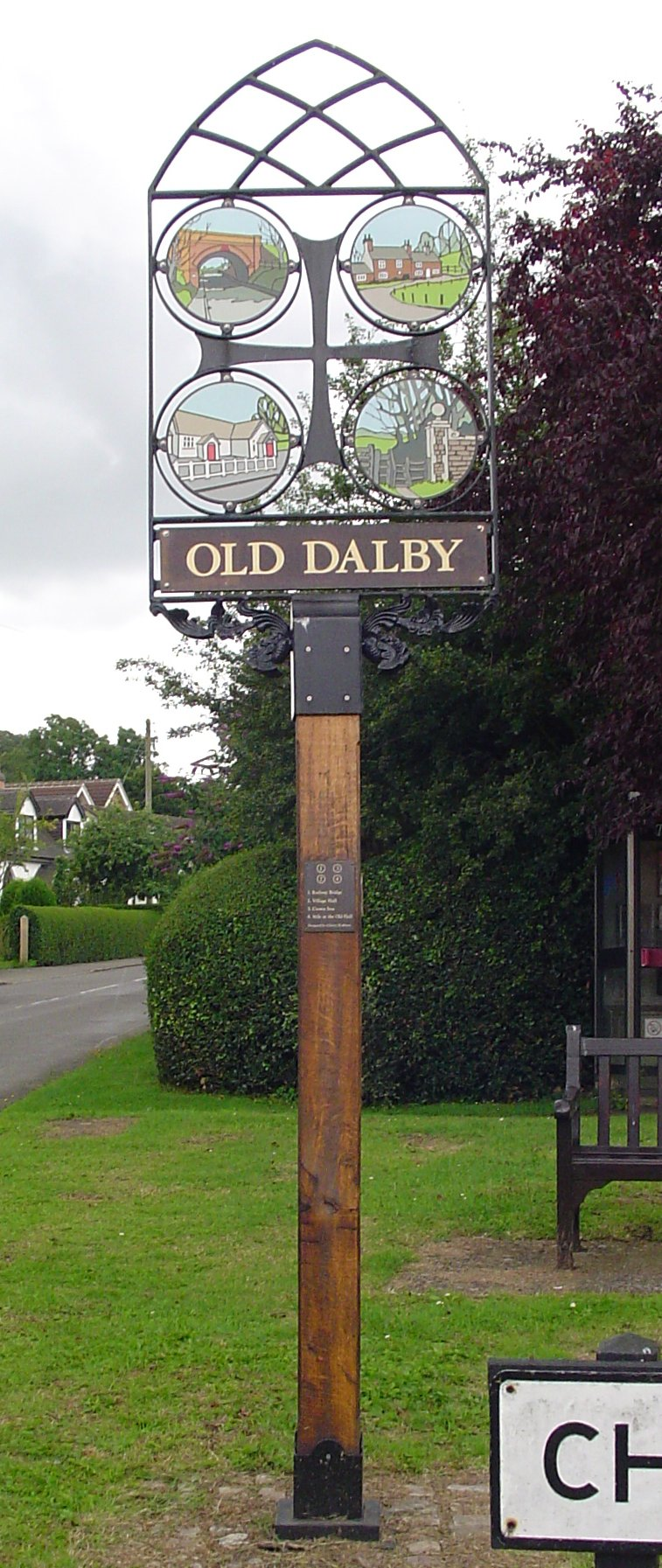
Signpost in Old Dalby by Christy Radburn

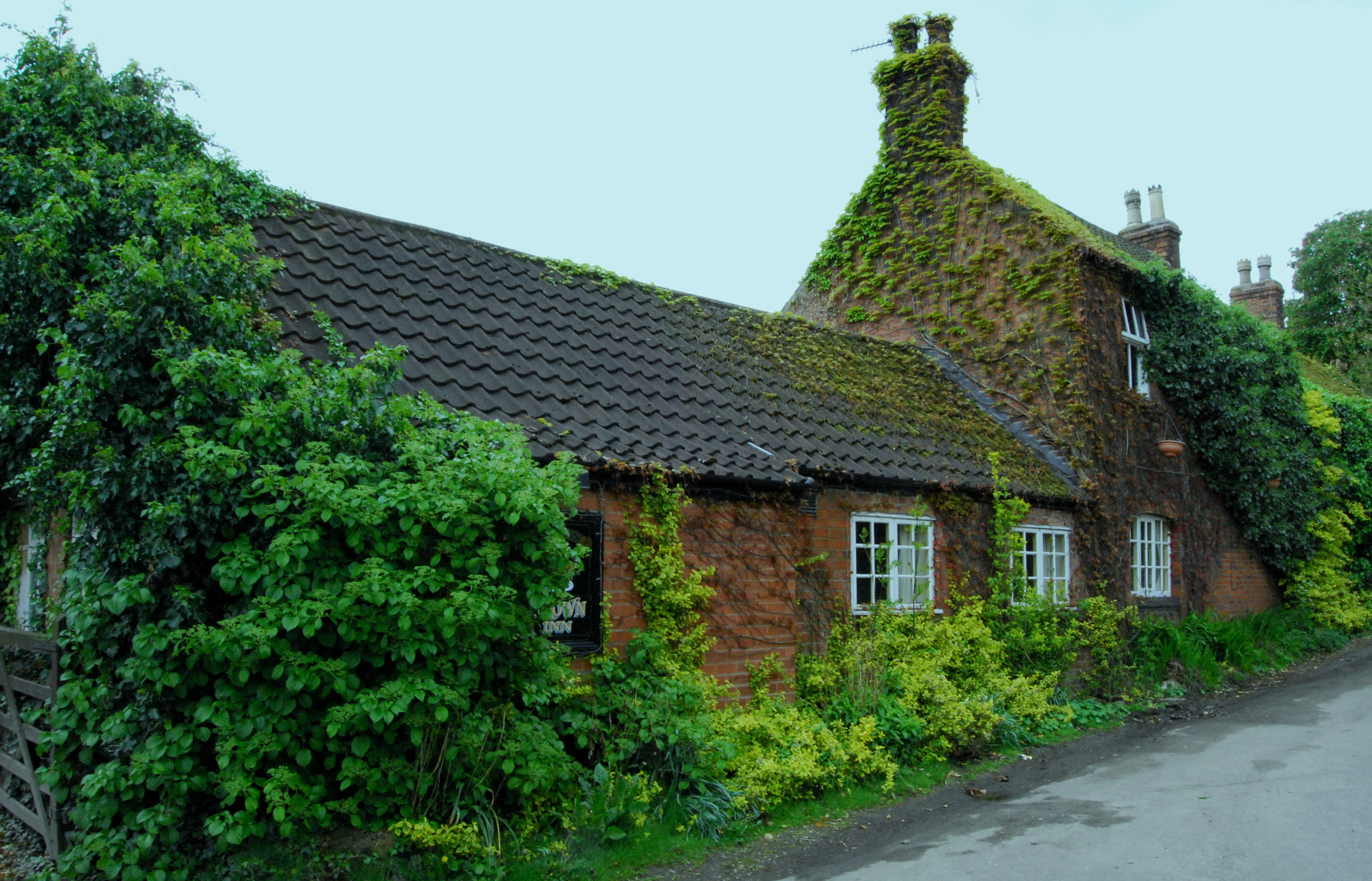
The Crown, Old Dalby

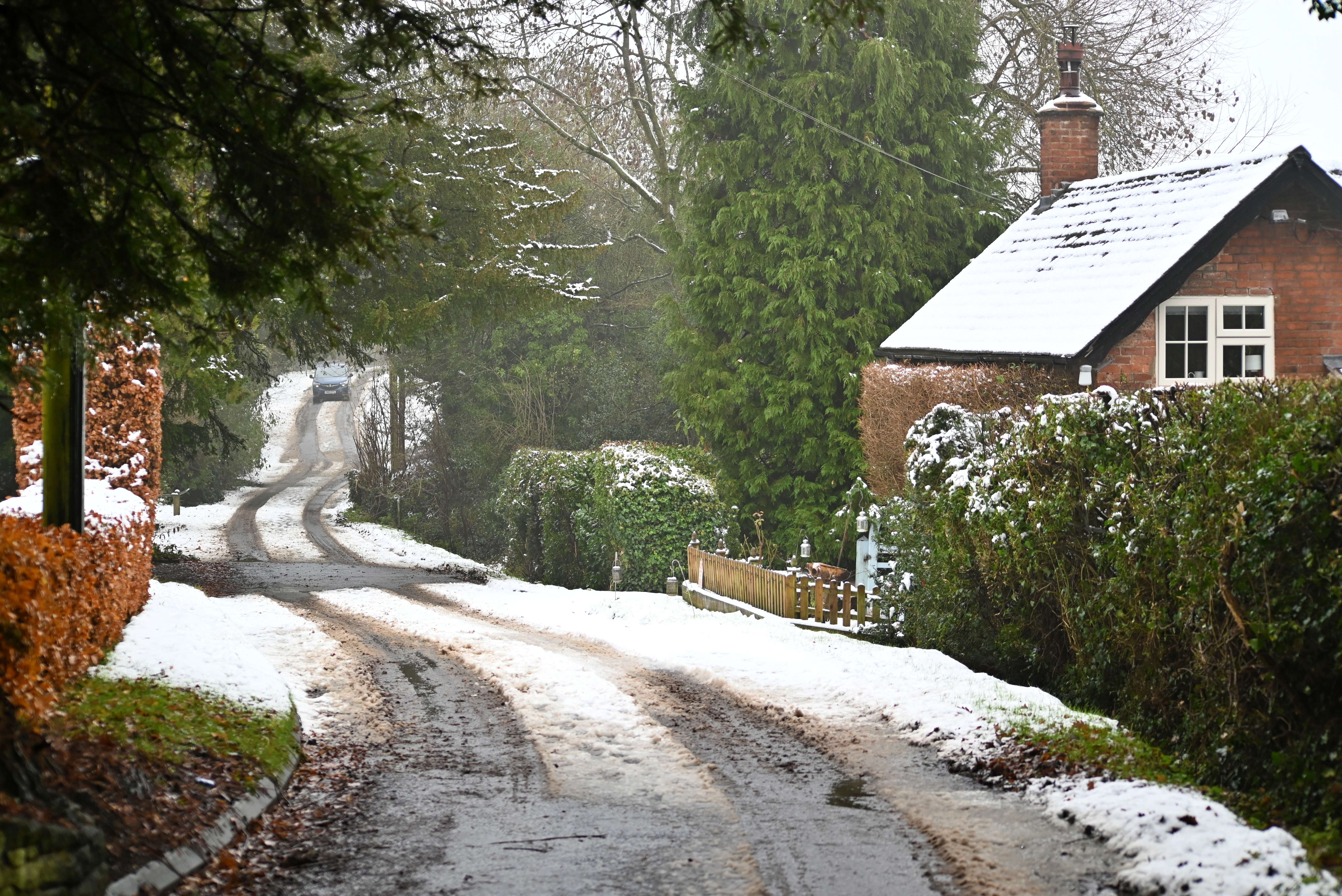
Paradise Lane in snow

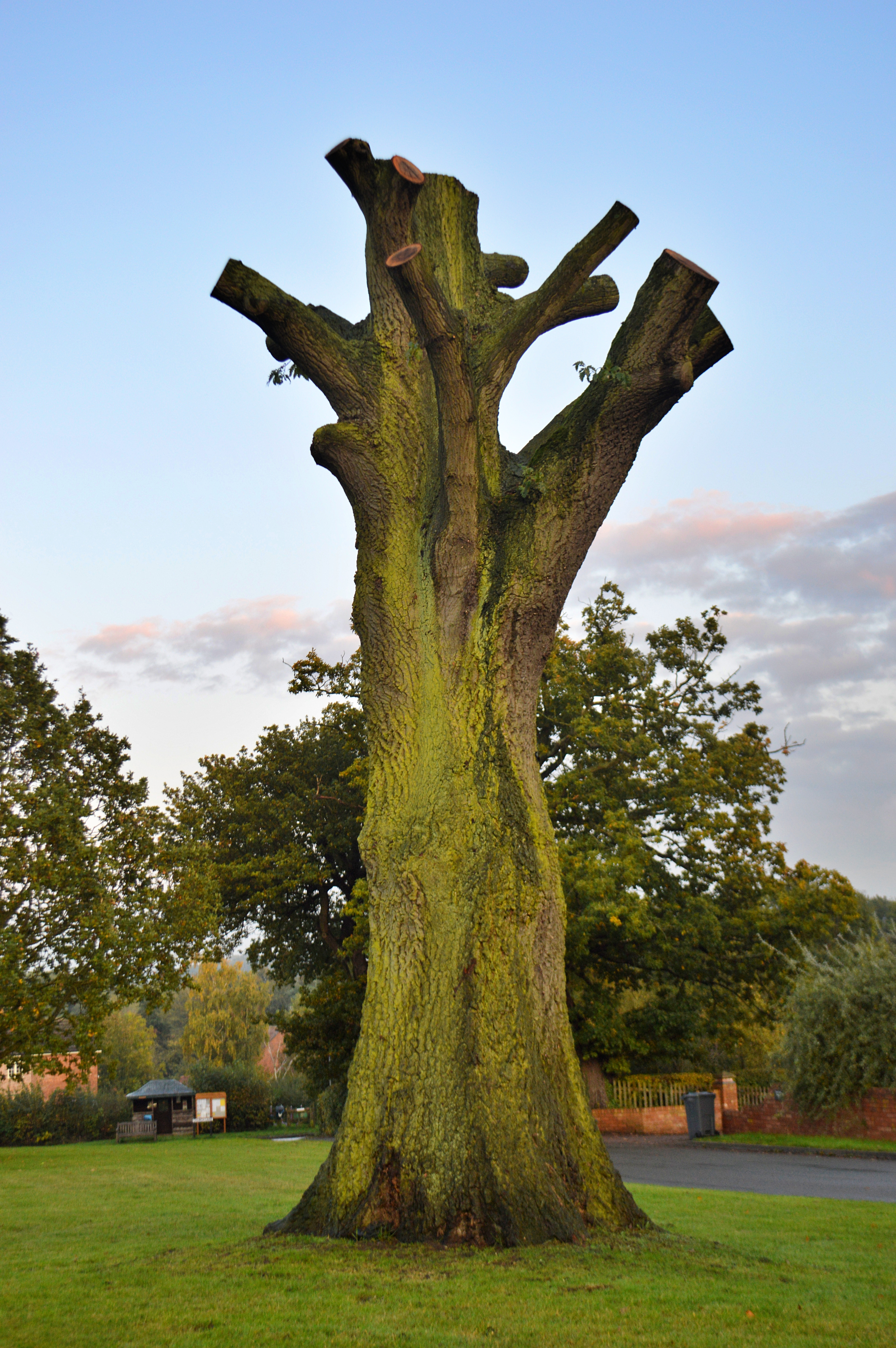
The old turkey oak at Old Dalby after pollarding

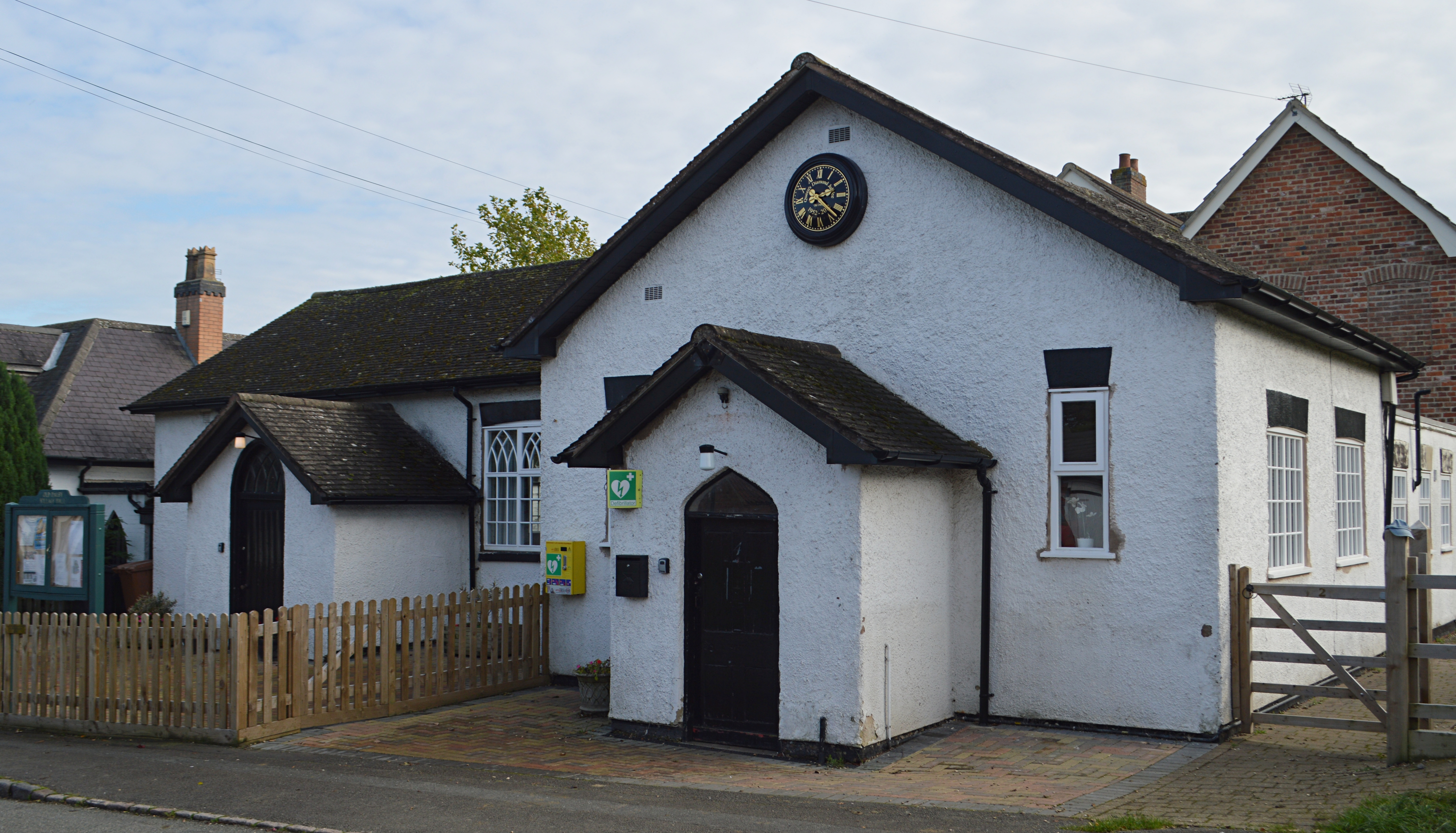
Once a school house Old Dalby Village Hall is a distinctive part of the village

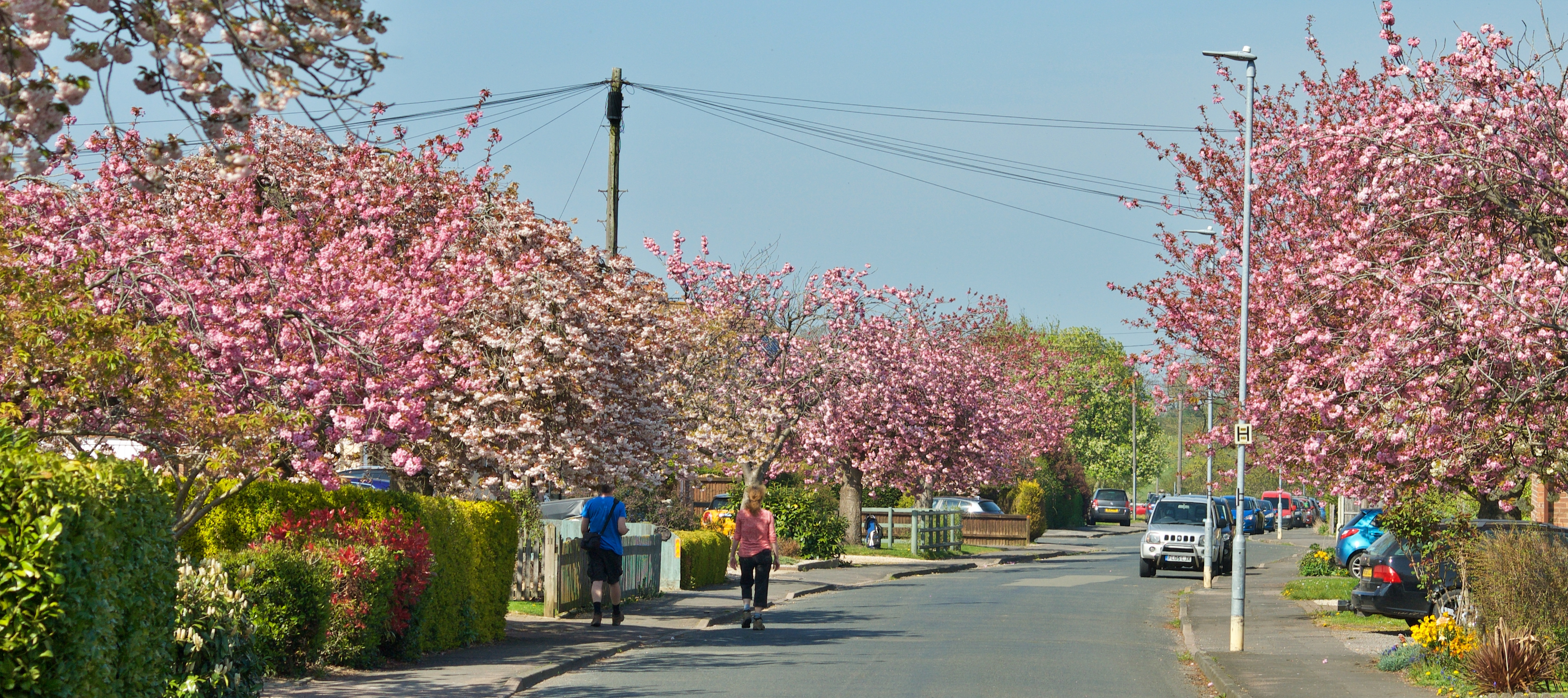
A view of Queensway, Old Dalby with cherry blossom.

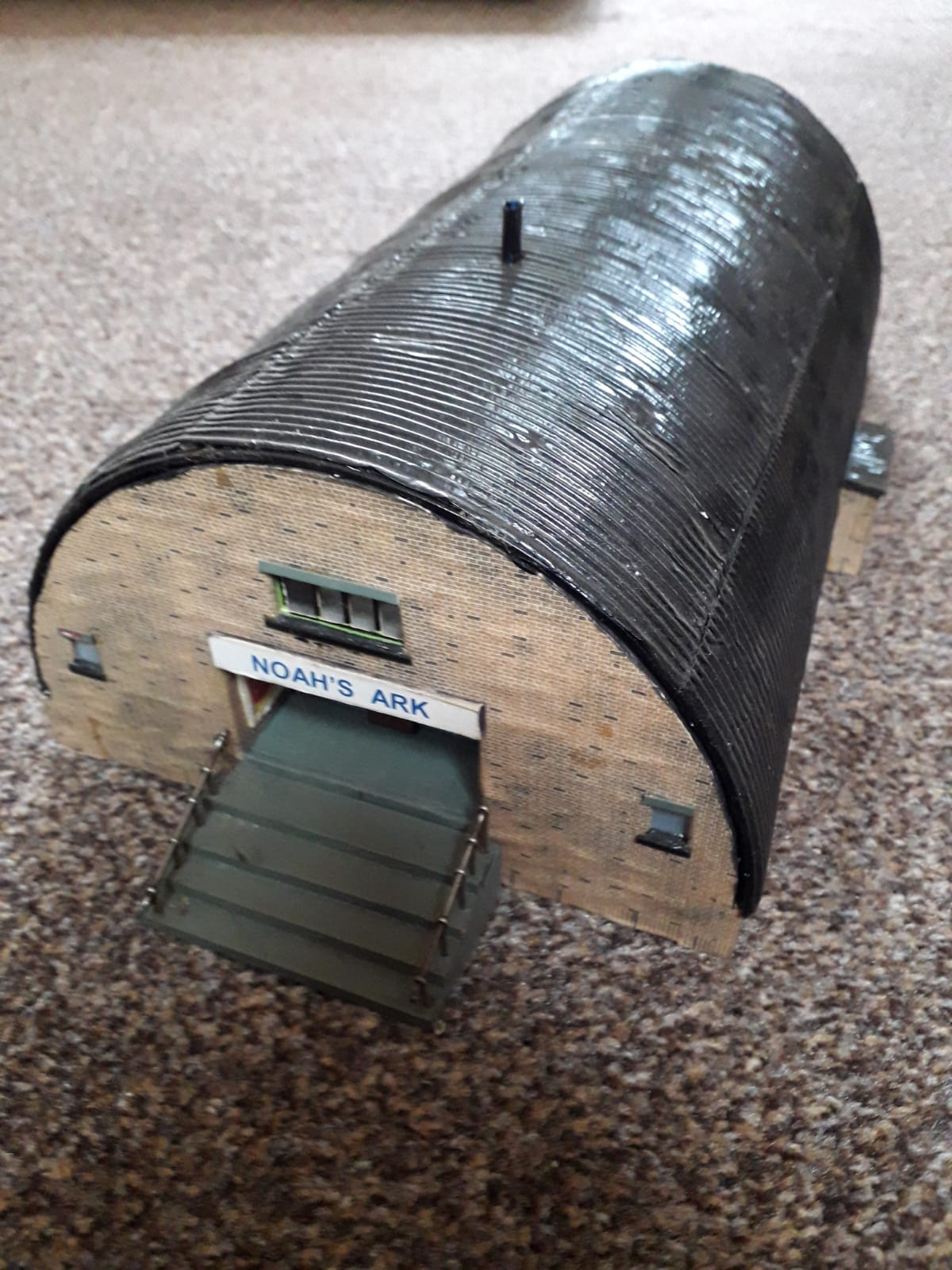
Front of Noah's Ark cinema, model made by Chris Chellis

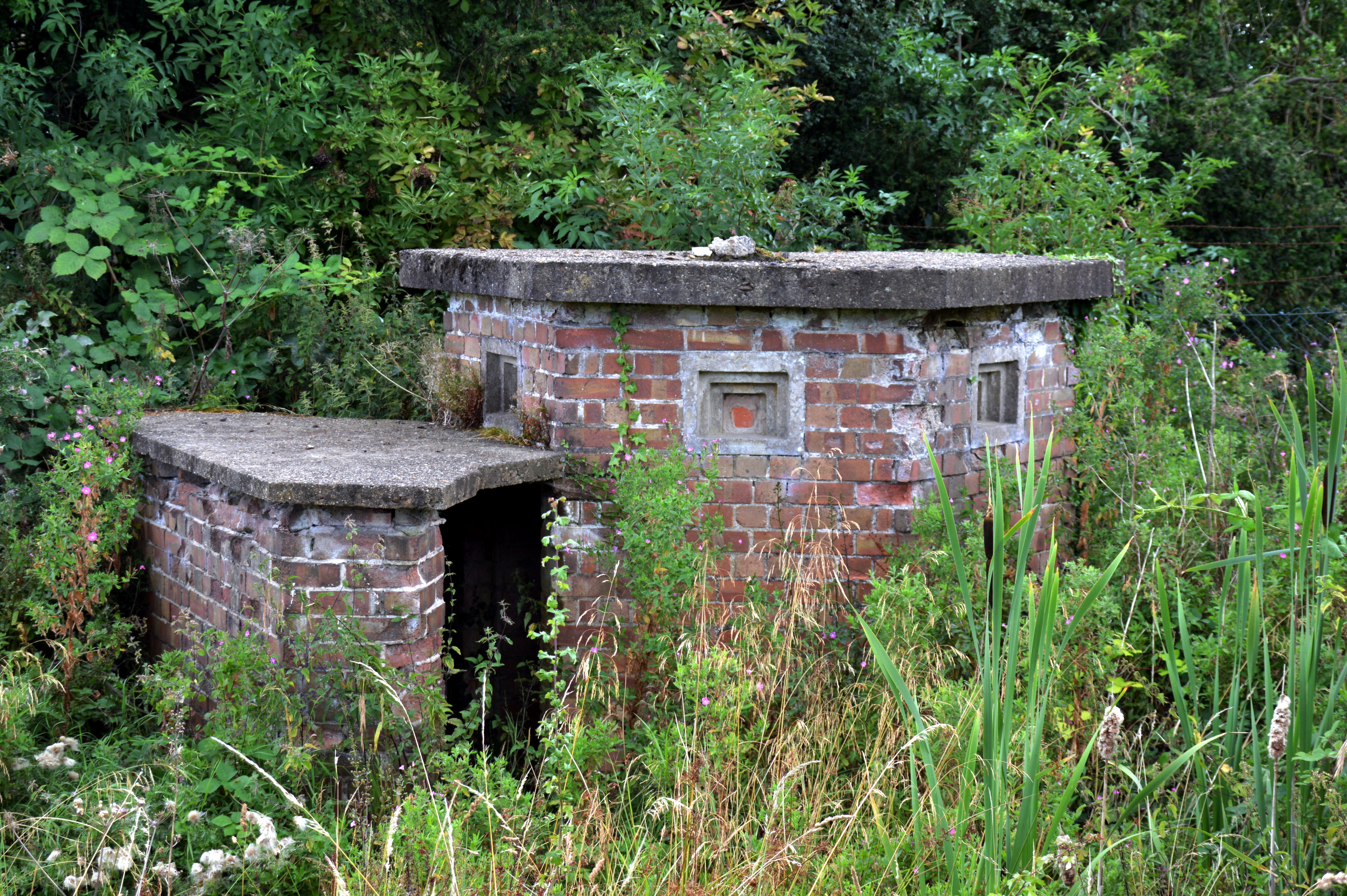
A Second World War gun emplacement on Station Road, Queensway

== Village ==
Old Dalby is a rural village with an active community. It has its own primary and pre-schools, Church, Scout, Cubs and Beaver Building at Queensway, and a retirement home, Hunter's Lodge. There is a pub/restaurant, the ancient refurbished 'The Crown'. There has been no post office for several years but there is a "pop-up" post office service. Details are available on the Old Dalby Village Hall website.

For around 33 years, on the August bank holiday Monday, the village held a fête known as "Old Dalby Day" to raise money for charities connected with the village. The fête grew to feature many events and attracted visitors from many miles around. In 2019 insufficient volunteers were prepared to help organise the event and Old Dalby Day was suspended.

In 2019 the prominent Turkey oak that stood at the village green was found to be diseased; it was initially pollarded rather than felled outright but finally removed in February 2024. In November 2025 the bole of the former Turkey Oak was carved and placed onto the village green.

The Knights Hospitallers owned a preceptory in the village from the early 12th century. Traces of the historically important Dalby Preceptory are still just visible on the surface. The ancient carp ponds survive to this day.

Before and early in the Second World War an Ordnance Depot was established to the east of the village serving as a storage depot for machinery, associated spares and tools. The depot closed in 1996 and now serves as Old Dalby Business Park. The camp that grew nearby to house the workers and military personnel for the depot was originally a series of Nissen huts housing nearly 3,500 soldiers and around 300 prisoners of war. These later became derelict and a housing estate developed there which is now a separate settlement known as Queensway.

== Village hall ==
The village hall is located at the centre of the village and was originally a school house. is the meeting place of several local societies, including the, Wine Club, yoga classes, the crafters and a "drop in" mornings. Other entertainment and events take place throughout the year. In 2018/9 the Hall was awarded a grant towards its refurbishment by the Heritage Lottery Fund. Events designed to further knowledge of the village's heritage and history have included a Feast Day with a visit from Tony Rotherham, a lecture on archaeology by Carenza Lewis and lessons in Edwardian dress and manners for children from the local school.

In September 2019 several test mini pits were excavated throughout the village under the supervision of Carenza Lewis. Amongst the finds were an array of clay pipes, 8th century earthernware and, from near the long gone Queensway Camp guardhouse, a soldier's cap badge. The heritage group has, with the advice and help of The Heritage Lottery Fund and Lincoln University, created an Archive to collate, record, digitise and archive a series of historical photographs and documents submitted by long-term residents. This initiative is in progress and can be accessed via the Village Hall website.

During lockdown, in 2020, many of the activities were suspended but the village hall committee worked hard to design and produce a display of the history of Old Dalby. This takes the form of a 3 metre long wall chart hung inside the hall at the end of December 2020.

== Queensway ==
Queensway, part of Old Dalby, is a housing estate of more than 200 homes around one mile (1.5 kilometres) east of the village. Green fields until 1938 the land was bought by the War Office and a camp established to serve the ordnance and maintenance depot that was built nearby at the outbreak of the Second World War. At the height of its use the camp housed some 3,500 army and civilian personnel, mainly in Nissen huts. The camp also guarded around 300 prisoners of war. Gradually houses were built, from the early 1950s and throughout the '60s, as homes for permanent officers and staff. The road “Queensway” was named for the Queen on her coronation in June 1953 and the entire settlement shortly thereafter adopted the name. The camp and depot had its own cinema, canteen/ restaurants, officers mess, dance hall and sports pitches.

After the war ended and the need for staff diminished, houses were sold and the army presence gradually reduced. The depot remained busy, however, repairing large weapons, their transport and equipment. A fence remained around the base for many years and the gates were actually locked and guarded for a while after IRA attacks on mainland Britain in the 1980s.

The depot continued in use throughout the Cold War and became a centre of excellence for maintenance of electronic and radar equipment. Finally closing as a military base in the 1990s the buildings became industrial units and remain as such. One of the buildings was taken by Belvoir Brewery who produce a wide range of ales and had their own alehouse and restaurant until their closure in 2020.

== Railway test track ==
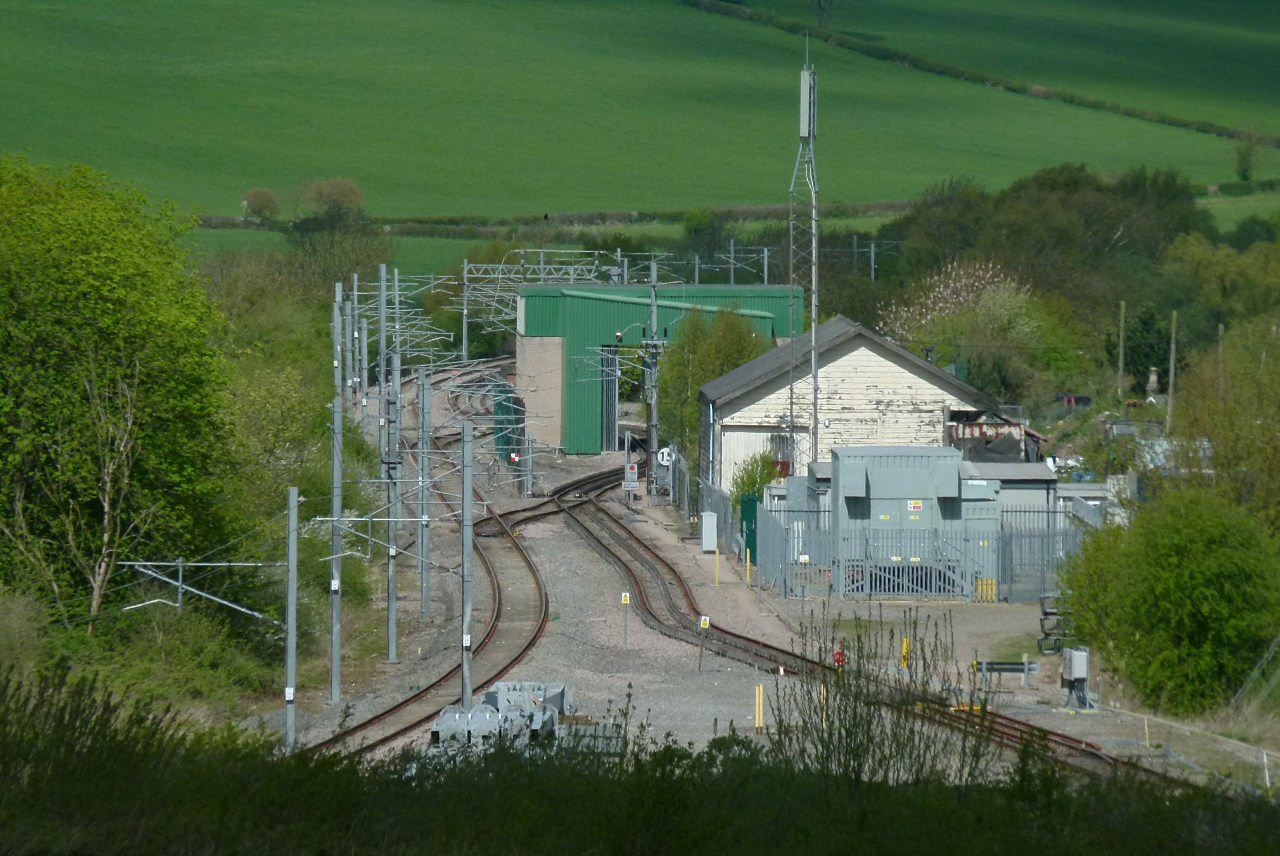
Old Dalby Test Track in April 2015

Old Dalby is the location of the control centre of the former British Rail Research Division's railway Old Dalby Test Track, which runs between Melton Mowbray and Edwalton.

It was established in 1970 to test the Advanced Passenger Train. In July 1984 the track was used to run a Class 46 locomotive and train into a stationary nuclear flask in order to prove the safety of the container. The test was recorded and reported widely enough to make Old Dalby famous for a while. A video of the test can be seen here.

As part of the privatisation of British Rail, the track was leased to Serco, with ownership passing from British Rail to BRB (Residuary) Limited.

In the early 2000s, the track was taken over by Alstom and electrified on the 25 kV overhead system in order to test the Class 390 Pendolinos it was building for Virgin Trains West Coast. During this upgrade phase the centre of operations moved from Old Dalby to Asfordby (on the outskirts of Melton Mowbray) where a depot was converted from the former National Coal Board's buildings. After the Pendolino project was completed in 2005, the line was mothballed.

In February 2007, Metronet the consortium charged with renewing a large proportion of the London Underground's lines, announced it had taken over the test track for the testing of new London Underground S7 and S8 Stock. To accomplish this it electrified part of the line with third and fourth rail system but the original 25 kV line was also retained for future use.
