= Nether Broughton =

Village in Leicestershire, England

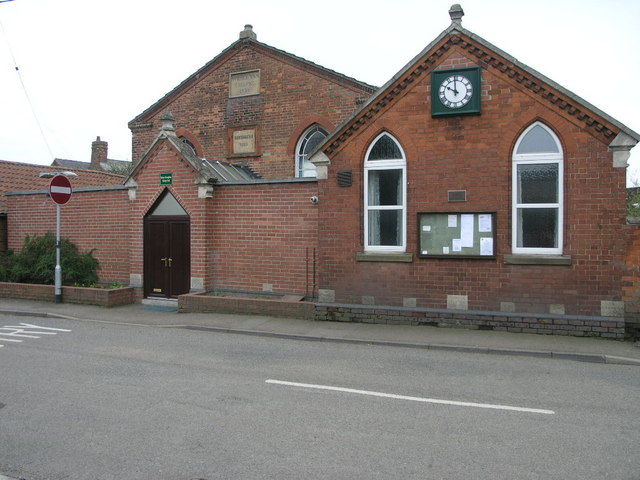
- The Old Chapel

- Location within Leicestershire
- Civil parish: Broughton and Old Dalby
- District: Melton
- Shire county: Leicestershire
- Region: East Midlands
- Country: England
- Sovereign state: United Kingdom
- Post town: Melton Mowbray
- Postcode district: LE14
- Dialling code: 01664
- Police: Leicestershire
- Fire: Leicestershire
- Ambulance: East Midlands
- UK Parliament: Melton and Syston

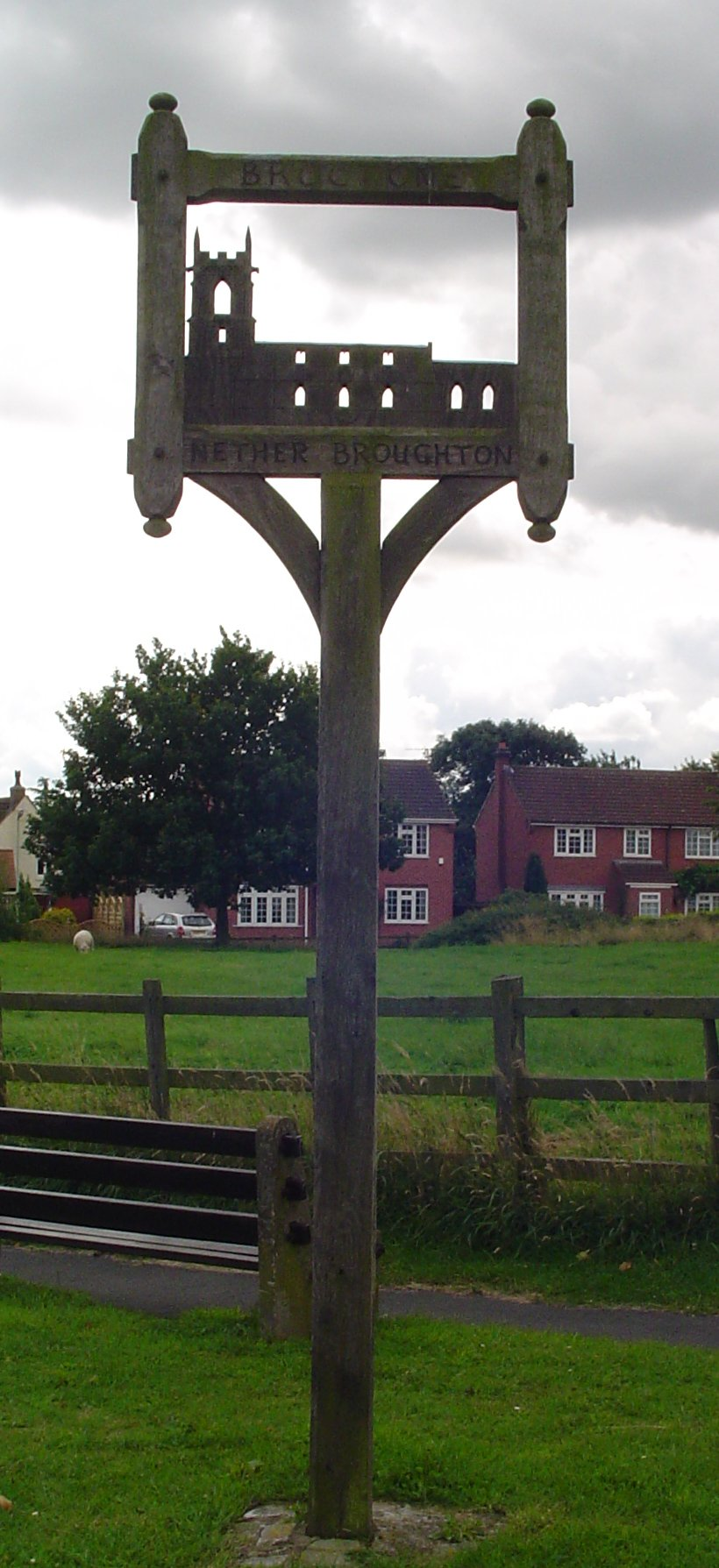
Signpost in Nether Broughton

Nether Broughton is a village and former civil parish, now in the parish of Broughton and Old Dalby, in the Melton district of Leicestershire, England. Broughton and Old Dalby's parish council is based in Nether Broughton. The village lies on the main A606 road between Melton Mowbray and Nottingham. The neighbouring village of Upper Broughton is on the same road, but within Nottinghamshire. In 1931 the parish had a population of 345. On 1 April 1936 the parish was abolished to form "Broughton and Old Dalby".

== Heritage ==
In 1887, John Bartholomew described the village as follows:

"Broughton, Nether, par., N. Leicestershire, on border of co., 5½ miles NW. of Melton Mowbray"

The Parish Church of St Mary the Virgin, in the Diocese of Leicester, is a Grade II* listed building dating back to the 13th and 14th centuries. A clerestory was added and the chancel rebuilt in the 15th century. It was restored in 1881 and the north wall of the north aisle rebuilt in 1903.

The village hall was originally the Wesleyan chapel. This was converted in the early 1990s into a venue that can be hired by local residents and groups and external parties.

A trail was developed in 2007 to depict the history of the village and local area. It provides nine interpretative boards at locations around the village.

== Education ==
The nearest primary school is Old Dalby Church of England Primary School. Secondary education is provided in Melton Mowbray.

== Transport ==
The village is served by infrequent Centrebus North daytime, weekday buses between Melton Mowbray and Bottesford (Service 23).

== Notable people ==
In order of birth:

- William Boultbee Sleath (c. 1763–1843), schoolmaster and cleric, who was headmaster of Repton School in 1800–1830, was born in the village.
- Stephen Glover (1794–1870), writer and antiquary, was brought up here by his grandmother.
- Charles Deedes (1879–1969), British Army officer, was born in the village. He held the high post of Military Secretary in 1934–1937.
