= John Sleath =

English cleric

John Sleath (1767–1847) was an English cleric and High Master of St Paul's School, London. He was elected a Fellow of the Royal Society in 1820.

== Life ==
The son of William and Millicent Sleath, he was baptised on 19 June 1767 at Osgathorpe, Leicestershire; his elder brother, William Boultbee Sleath, was headmaster of Repton School from 1800 to 1832. He entered Rugby School in 1776, his parents being then described as of Leighton, near Kimbolton. In 1784 he went up as a Rugby exhibitioner to Lincoln College, Oxford, but in 1785 was elected to a scholarship at Wadham. He was Hody exhibitioner in 1786–7. He graduated B.A. in 1789, M.A. in 1793, B.D. and D.D. in 1814.

In 1787, before taking his degree, Sleath was appointed to an assistant-mastership at Rugby School. Among his pupils there was Walter Savage Landor, who later wrote of him "elegant and generous". On 16 June 1814 Sleath was appointed High Master—headmaster—of St Paul's School, and was in post to 10 October 1837. The university entrance results for his pupils were good, with Benjamin Jowett being among them, and nine fellows of Trinity College, Cambridge. He was elected Fellow of the Society of Antiquaries of London on 9 March 1815, and Fellow of the Royal Society on 23 March 1820. For all his prestige, he was stymied on curriculum reform at the school by its governing body.

Sleath was made prebendary of Rugmere in St Paul's Cathedral, 5 July 1822; chaplain in ordinary to King George in 1825; subdean of the Chapel Royal, St James's, 28 June 1833; rector of Thornby, Northamptonshire, in 1841. He died 30 April 1847, and was buried in the crypt of St Paul's. A marble bust of him by William Behnes was executed in 1841.

== Family ==
Sleath was married, but left no family.
