= Saxelbye =

Village in Leicestershire, England

Coordinates: 52.7821°N 0.9636°W

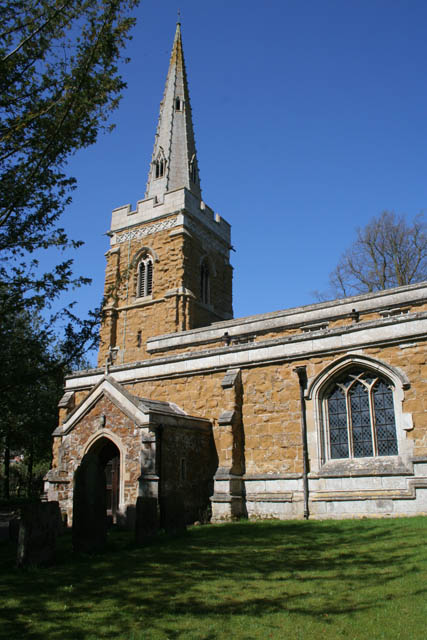
- St Peter's Church

- Location within Leicestershire
- OS grid reference: SK7021
- Civil parish: Grimston
- District: Melton
- Shire county: Leicestershire
- Region: East Midlands
- Country: England
- Sovereign state: United Kingdom
- Post town: MELTON MOWBRAY
- Postcode district: LE14
- Dialling code: 01664
- Police: Leicestershire
- Fire: Leicestershire
- Ambulance: East Midlands
- UK Parliament: Melton and Syston

Saxelbye (or Saxelby) is a village in the civil parish of Grimston, in the district of Melton in Leicestershire, England. The village lies about three miles to the north-west of Melton Mowbray and is situated on the southern slope of the ridge that makes up the southern boundary of the Vale of Belvoir. In 1931 the parish had a population of 75. On 1 April 1936 the parish of Saxelby was abolished and merged with Grimston.

The Grade II* church with its crocketed spire is dedicated to St Peter.

Webster’s Dairy in Saxelbye, founded in 1883, is one of only six dairies where Stilton cheese is produced.

The Old Dalby Test Track passes close to the village.
