= Shoby =

Hamlet in Leicestershire, England

Coordinates: 52.774708°N 0.99090409°W

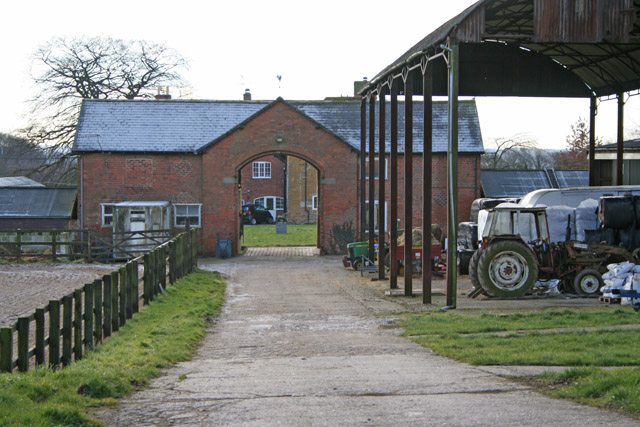
- Shoby Priory

- Location within Leicestershire
- Population: 39 (2000 estimate)
- Civil parish: Grimston
- District: Melton
- Shire county: Leicestershire
- Region: East Midlands
- Country: England
- Sovereign state: United Kingdom
- Police: Leicestershire
- Fire: Leicestershire
- Ambulance: East Midlands

Shoby is a hamlet in the civil parish of Grimston, in the Melton district, in the county of Leicestershire, England. It is 12 miles (19 km) north east of Leicester. In 2000 it had an estimated population of 39.

== History ==
The name "Shoby" means 'Sigvald's farm/settlement'. Shoby was recorded in the Domesday Book as Seoldesberie. Shoby is a deserted medieval village, it was deserted between 1350 and 1400 because of the Black Death or retreat from marginal lands. Shoby had a priory, a building is now on the site, which was formerly Priory Farmhouse and now called "Shoby Priory" and is a Grade II listed building. Shoby was an extra-parochial area, in 1858 it became a civil parish, on 1 April 1936 the parish was abolished and merged with Grimston. In 1931 the parish had a population of 49. Gregory Brokesby who was a resident of Shoby became the Sheriff of Leicestershire in 1632.
