= Broughton and Old Dalby =

Civil parish in Leicestershire, England

Coordinates: 52.818°N 0.988°W

Broughton and Old Dalby is a civil parish in the Melton district of Leicestershire, England. According to the 2001 census it had a population of 1,400, rising marginally to 1,405 at the 2011 census. It includes Nether Broughton and Old Dalby. However, Upper Broughton also has an LE14 postcode but lies entirely within Nottinghamshire and is not part of the civil parish of Broughton and Old Dalby. The parish was created on 1 April 1936 from the former area of Nether Broughton and Old Dalby civil parishes. 21 acres of the parish were transferred to Upper Broughton, Nottinghamshire, on 1 April 1965.
