= Stathern =

Village in Leicestershire, England

Coordinates: 52°52′20.2″N 0°51′15.3″W

- Location within Leicestershire
- Population: 728 (2011 Census)
- District: Melton
- Shire county: Leicestershire
- Region: East Midlands
- Country: England
- Sovereign state: United Kingdom
- Post town: MELTON MOWBRAY
- Postcode district: LE14
- Dialling code: 01949
- Police: Leicestershire
- Fire: Leicestershire
- Ambulance: East Midlands
- UK Parliament: Melton and Syston

Stathern is an English village and civil parish in the Melton district of Leicestershire. It lies in the Vale of Belvoir about 10 miles (16 km) north of Melton Mowbray. Its church has an unusual dedication and its school a long history. Its pub doubles as a post office.

== Population ==
In the 2001 census the parish had 288 dwellings, and a population of 672. The population had increased to 728 at the time of the 2011 census, and was estimated at 751 in 2019.

== Amenities ==
The village has an Anglican church, St Guthlac's, listed Grade II*. Parts of it date from the 13th and 17th centuries. It was restored in 1867–1868 under R. W. Johnson. Guthlac of Crowland was a Lincolnshire hermit-saint of the 7th–8th century. The church has a ring of five bells. It normally holds a family service on the first Sunday in the month.

The village primary school in Water Lane dates back at least to 1868 and in some form to 1845. It has about 100 pupils.

The public house, The Lily Of the Vale, also acts as a restaurant and provides thrice-weekly post office services. There coffee shop, village store and bed-and-breakfast accommodation available in the village.

Stathern is served by hourly weekday, daytime buses between Melton Mowbray and Bottesford or Bingham. The nearest railway station is at Bottesford (8 miles/12.9 km), with services to and beyond Nottingham and Grantham or Skegness.

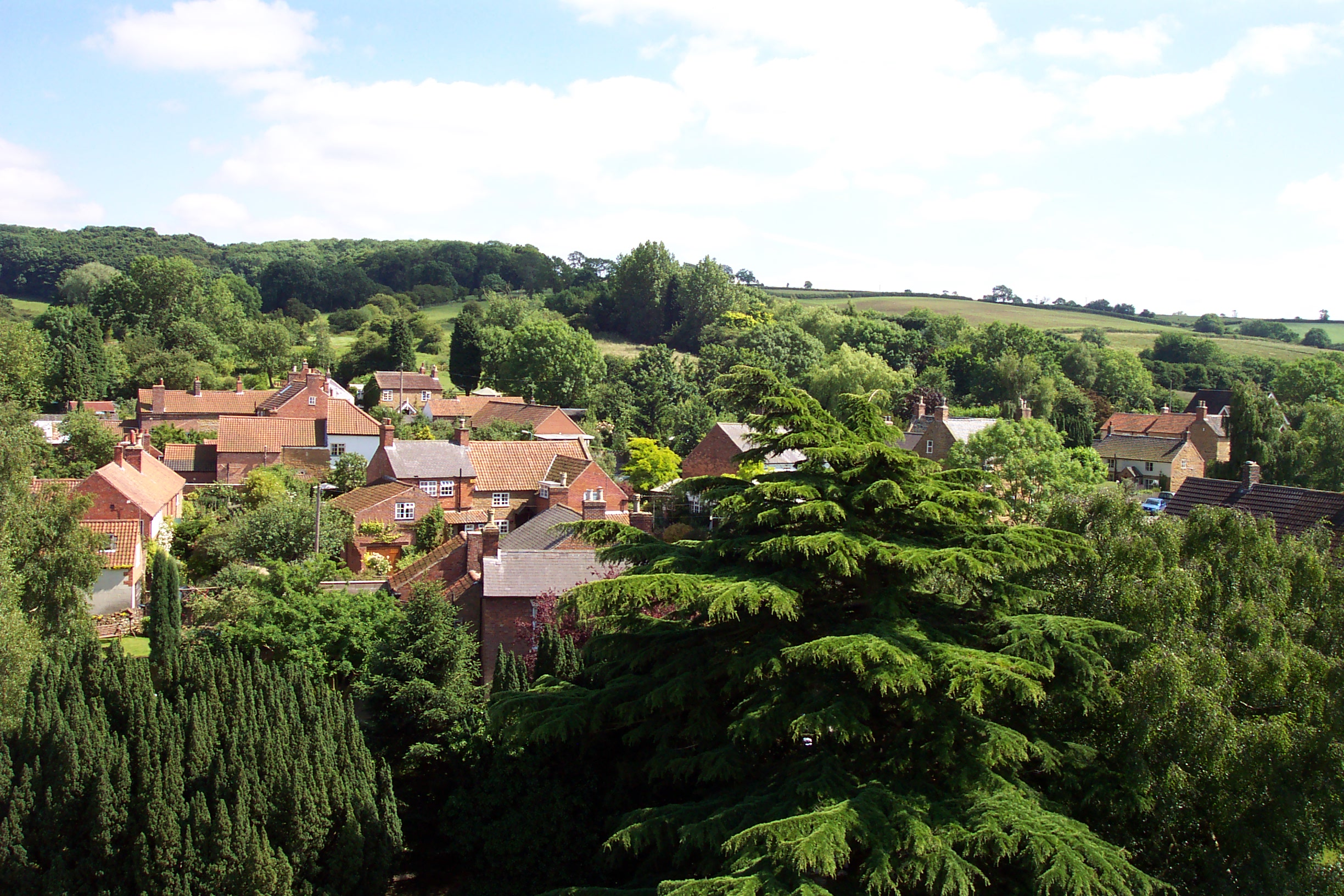
View of Stathern looking South from the roof of St Guthlac's Church

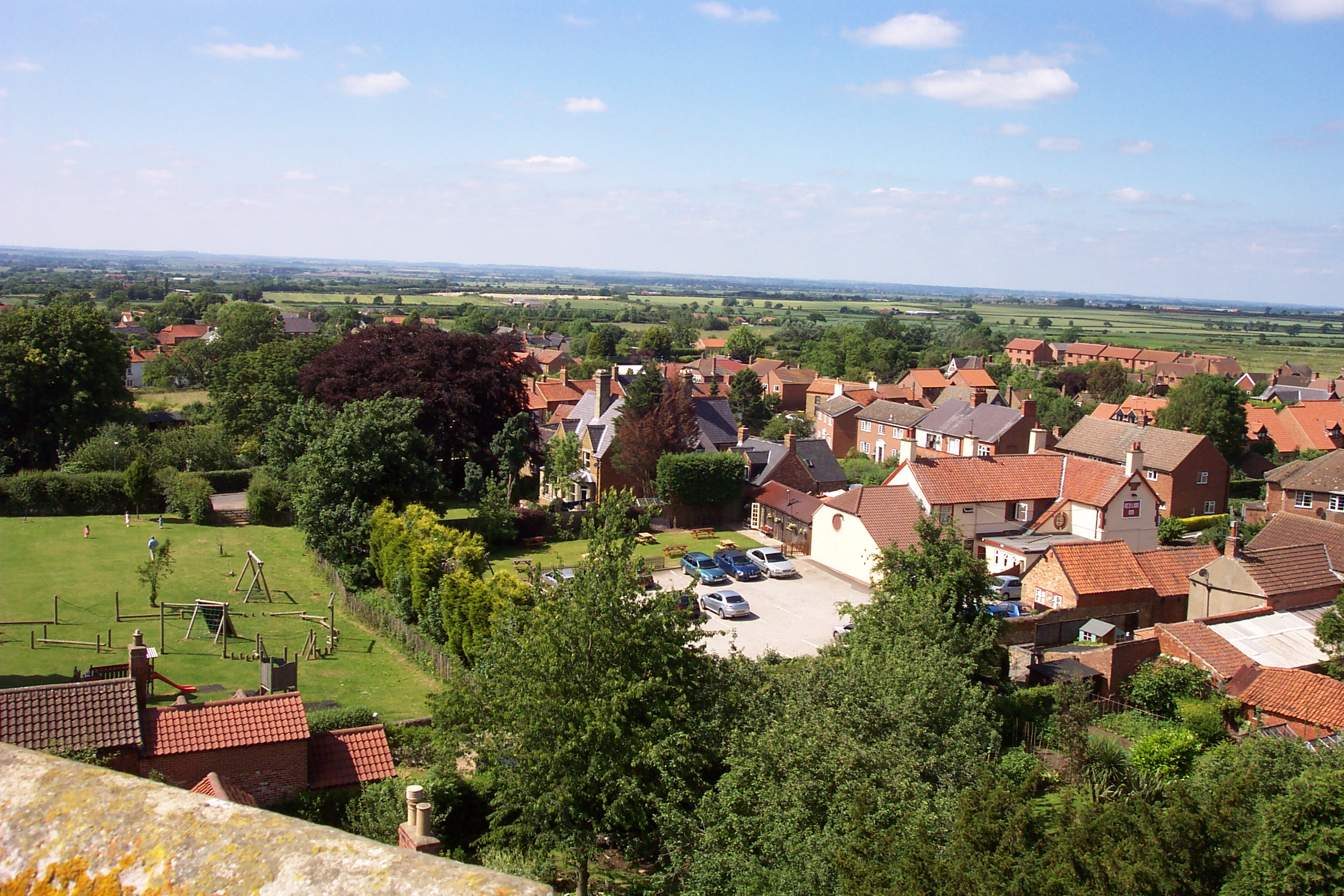
View of Stathern looking North from the roof of St Guthlac's Church

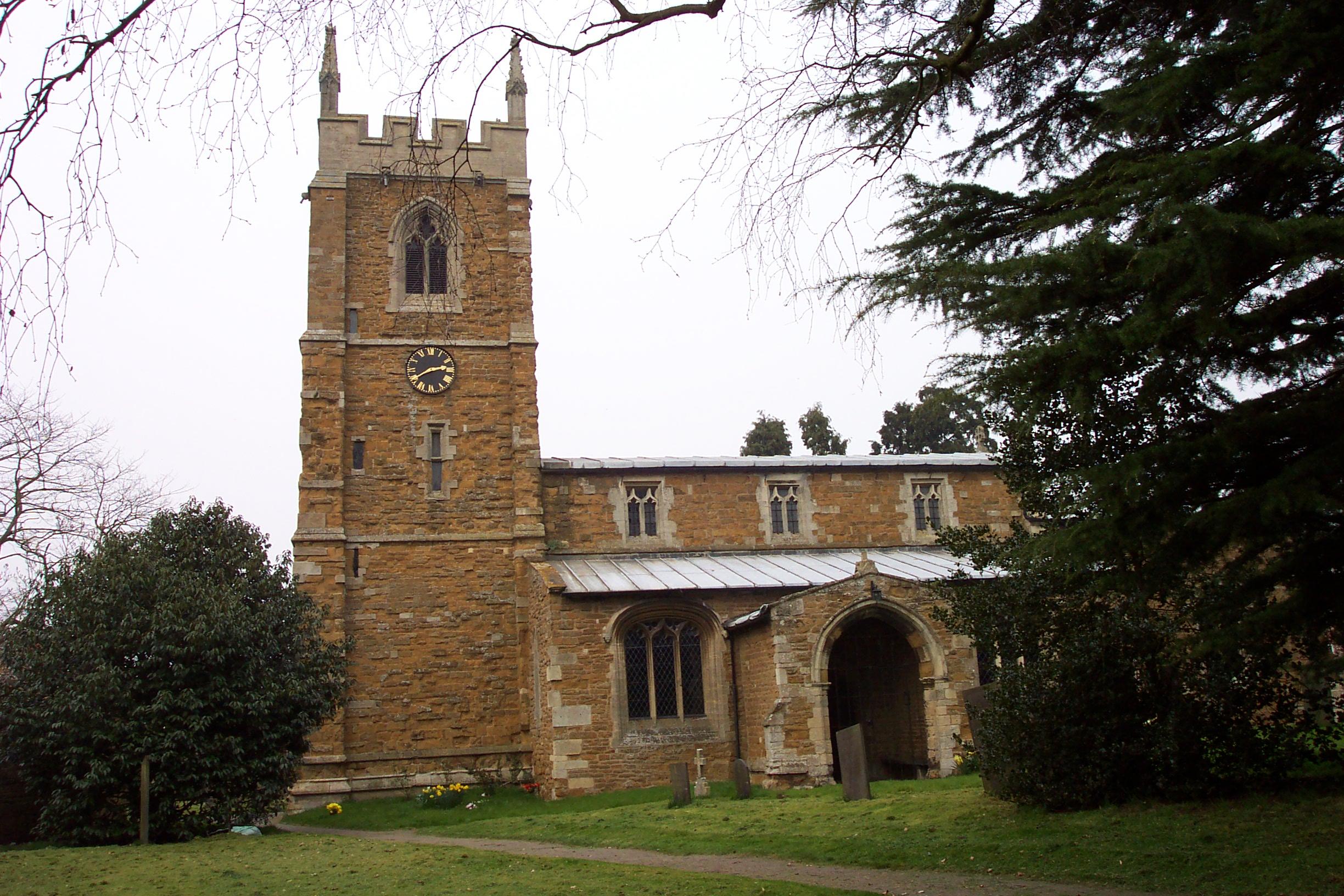
St Guthlac's Church

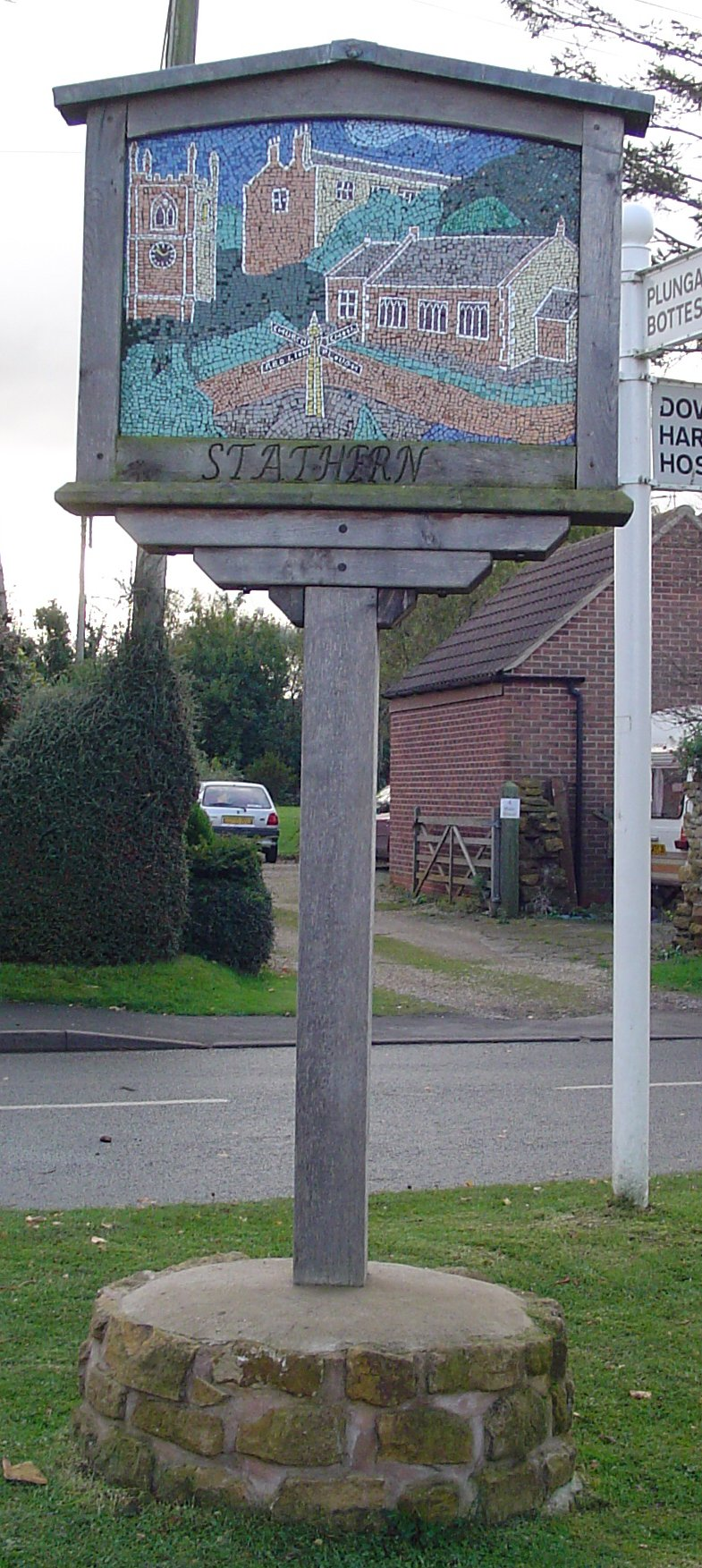
Signpost in Stathern

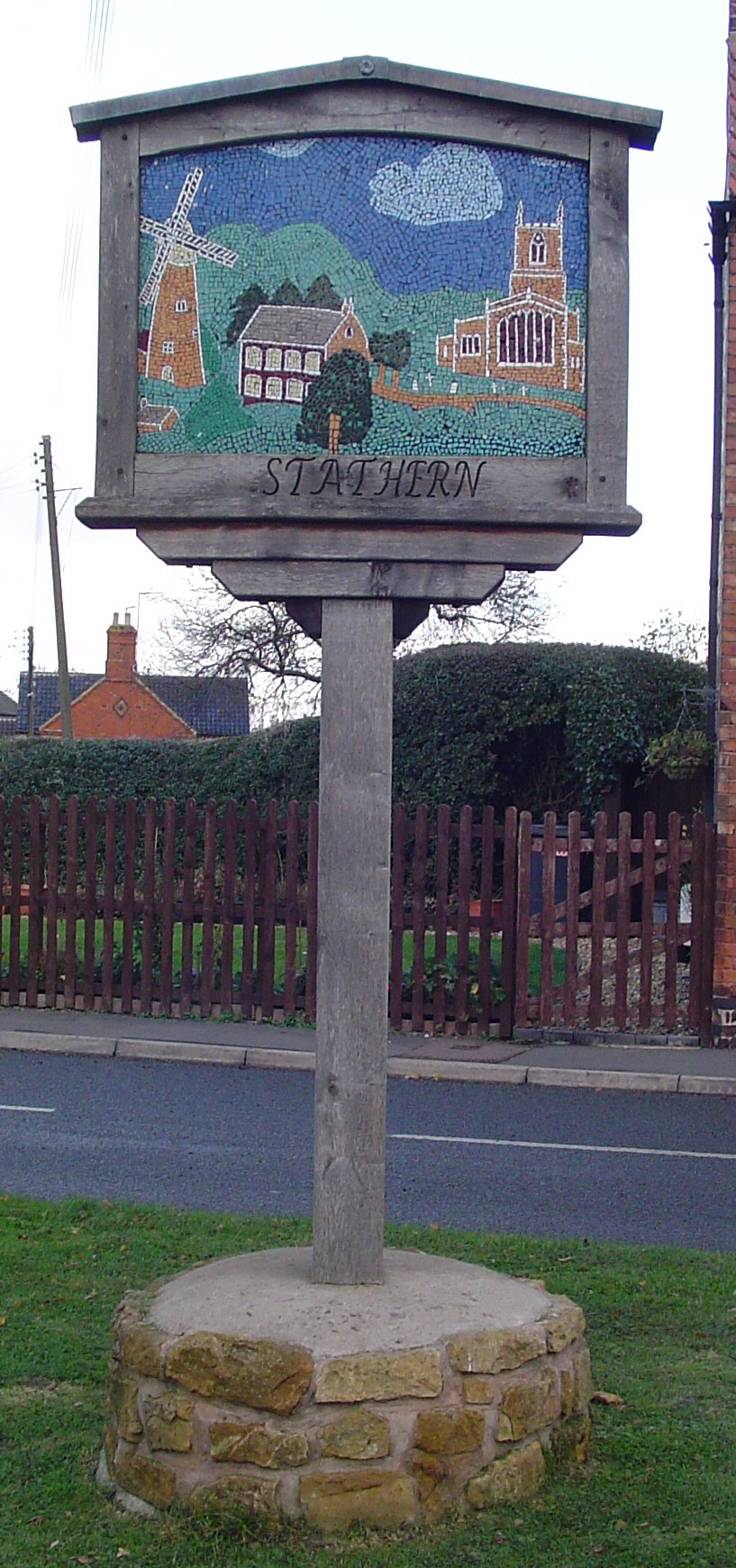
Signpost in Stathern
