= 2019 Melton Borough Council election =

2019 UK local government election

- 2 May 2019

All 28 seats to Melton Borough Council 15 seats needed for a majority

	First party	Second party	Third party
Party	Conservative	Independent	Green
Last election	26 seats, 56.2%	2 seats, 13.1%	N/A
Seats won	22	5	1
Seat change	▼4	▲3	▲1
Popular vote	9,645	2,419	2,309
Percentage	59.7%	15.0%	14.3%
Swing	▲3.5%	▲1.9%	N/A
- Results by ward
Council control before election
Conservative
Council control after election
Conservative

The 2019 Melton Borough Council election took place on 2 May 2019 to elect members of the Melton Borough Council in England. It was held on the same day as other local elections.

== Summary ==
=== Election result ===
2019 Melton Borough Council election
Party	Candidates	Seats	Gains	Losses	Net gain/loss	Seats %	Votes %	Votes	+/−
Conservative	27	22	1	5	▼4	82.1	59.7	9,645	+3.5
Independent	8	5	4	1	▲3	14.3	15.0	2,419	+1.9
Green	7	1	1	0	▲1	3.6	14.3	2,309	N/A
Labour	5	0	0	0	Steady	0.0	7.4	1,189	–12.7
UKIP	1	0	0	0	Steady	0.0	2.2	352	–8.4
Liberal Democrats	1	0	0	0	Steady	0.0	1.4	234	N/A

== Ward results ==
=== Asfordby ===
Asfordby
Party	Candidate	Votes	%	±%
Independent	Steven Carter	374	56.5	
Conservative	Ronald de Burle	288	43.5	
Conservative	Mallic Sheldon	235		
Majority				
Turnout				
Independent gain from Conservative				
Conservative hold				

=== Bottesford ===
Bottesford
Party	Candidate	Votes	%	±%
Conservative	Pru Chandler	Unopposed		
Independent	Donald Pritchett	Unopposed		
Majority				
Turnout				
Conservative hold				
Independent gain from Conservative				

=== Croxton Kerrial ===
Croxton Kerrial
Party	Candidate	Votes	%	±%
Independent	Alan Hewson	375	62.2	
Conservative	Michael Hollingworth	228	37.8	
Majority				
Turnout				
Independent gain from Conservative		Swing		

=== Frisby on the Wreake ===
Frisby on the Wreake
Party	Candidate	Votes	%	±%
Conservative	Ronan Browne	Unopposed		
Majority				
Turnout				
Conservative hold		Swing		

=== Gaddesby ===
Gaddesby
Party	Candidate	Votes	%	±%
Conservative	Robert Child	Unopposed		
Majority				
Turnout				
Conservative hold		Swing		

=== Long Clawson and Stathern ===
Long Clawson and Stathern
Party	Candidate	Votes	%	±%
Independent	Christopher Evans	713	52.4	
Conservative	Melanie Steadman	648	47.6	
Conservative	Pamela Baguley	517		
Majority				
Turnout				
Independent gain from Conservative				
Conservative hold				

=== Melton Craven ===
Melton Craven
Party	Candidate	Votes	%	±%
Conservative	Jeanne-Marie Douglas	253	35.9	
Conservative	Robert Bindloss	252		
Independent	Mark Frisby	249	35.3	
Independent	Marilyn Gordon	246		
Labour	John Ogden	203	28.8	
Independent	Frank Duckworth	111		
Turnout				
Conservative hold				
Conservative hold				

=== Melton Dorian ===
Melton Dorian
Party	Candidate	Votes	%	±%
Conservative	Patricia Cumbers	477	52.1	
Green	Philip Wood	438	47.9	
Conservative	Alan Pearson	429		
Conservative	John Wyatt	385		
Turnout				
Conservative hold				
Green gain from Conservative				
Conservative hold				

=== Melton Egerton ===
Melton Egerton
Party	Candidate	Votes	%	±%
Conservative	Rebecca Smedley	235	36.9	
Conservative	Peter Faulkner	226		
Green	Amanda Reeves	207	32.5	
Labour	Michael Brown	194	30.5	
Labour	Susan Karran	179		
Green	John Reeves	161		
Turnout				
Conservative hold				
Conservative gain from Independent				

=== Melton Newport ===
Melton Newport
Party	Candidate	Votes	%	±%
Conservative	Pamela Posnett	751	47.0	+1.1
Conservative	Simon Lumley	656		
Conservative	Margaret Glancy	649		
Green	Alastair McQuillan	495	31	+31
UKIP	John Scutter	352	22	+22
Turnout				
Conservative hold				
Conservative hold				
Conservative hold				

=== Melton Sysonby ===
Melton Sysonby
Party	Candidate	Votes	%	±%
Conservative	Teipal Bains	657	44.9	+12.4
Conservative	John Illingworth	552		
Conservative	Jacob Wilkinson	508		
Green	Rosemary Johnson	429	29.3	+29.3
Labour	Peter Karran	376	25.7	+4.4
Turnout				
Conservative hold				
Conservative hold				
Conservative hold				

=== Melton Warwick ===
Melton Warwick
Party	Candidate	Votes	%	±%
Conservative	Alison Freer-Jones	389	42.8	
Conservative	Christopher Fisher	327		
Green	Caroline Arkless	283	31.1	
Labour	Timothy Litt	237	26.1	
Turnout				
Conservative hold				
Conservative hold				

=== Old Dalby ===
Old Dalby
Party	Candidate	Votes	%	±%
Conservative	Joseph Orson	380	56.2	
Green	Kim Lee	296	43.8	
Majority				
Turnout				
Conservative hold		Swing		

=== Somerby ===
Somerby
Party	Candidate	Votes	%	±%
Conservative	Leigh Higgins	450	65.8	
Liberal Democrats	Hamish McAuley	234	34.2	
Majority				
Turnout				
Conservative hold		Swing		

=== Waltham on the Wolds ===
Waltham on the Wolds
Party	Candidate	Votes	%	±%
Independent	Elaine Holmes	351	69.6	
Conservative	Keran Turakhia	153	30.4	
Majority				
Turnout				
Independent hold		Swing		

=== Wymondham ===
Wymondham
Party	Candidate	Votes	%	±%
Conservative	Malise Graham	Unopposed		
Majority				
Turnout				
Conservative hold		Swing		

== Changes 2019–2023 ==
- Simon Lumley (Melton Newport), elected as a Conservative, left the party in June 2020 to sit as an independent.
- Donald Pritchett (Bottesford), elected as an independent, joined the Conservative Party in September 2021. Leigh Higgins (Somerby), elected as a Conservative, was suspended from the party whip at the same time and later expelled from the group; he was suspended over remarks at the 2021 Best of Melton Awards, which an independent inquiry cleared him of. He returned to the party in March 2023 but left the party again in April 2023 to stand for re-election as an independent.
- John Illingworth (Melton Sysonby) returned to the Conservative Party in October 2021.
- Peter Faulkner (Melton Egerton), elected as a Conservative, left the party in May 2022 to sit as an independent.
- Christopher Evans (Long Clawson and Stathern), elected as an independent, joined the Conservative Party in November 2022.
- Pat Cumbers (Melton Dorian), elected as a Conservative, lost her chairmanship of the scrutiny committee after supporting Higgins, and left the Conservative group by April 2023 to stand for re-election as an independent.
- Mel Steadman (Long Clawson and Stathern), elected as a Conservative, died on 19 August 2022.
- Margaret Glancy (Melton Newport), elected as a Conservative, was removed as chair of planning after supporting Higgins, and left the party by April 2023 to sit as an independent.
- Peter Faulkner (Melton Egerton), who had already left the Conservatives in May 2022, said as mayor he was pressured to silence Higgins and refused.

=== By-elections ===
==== Melton Dorian ====
A by-election was held on 11 November 2021 after Independent councillor Alan Pearson, who had been elected as a Conservative, was disqualified for not attending any council meeting for six months. The Conservatives held the seat.

Melton Dorian: 11 November 2021
Party	Candidate	Votes	%	±%
Conservative	Tim Webster	362	56.0	+3.9
Labour	Sarah Cox	284	44.0	+44
Majority		78	12.0	
Turnout		651	15.0	
Rejected ballots		5	0.8	
Conservative hold		Swing	▼20.1	

==== Melton Sysonby ====
A by-election was held on 31 March 2022 after Conservative councillor Tejpal Bains stood down. The Conservatives held the seat.

Melton Sysonby: 31 March 2022
Party	Candidate	Votes	%	±%
Conservative	Siggy Atherton	396	53.2	+8.3
Liberal Democrats	Jim Adcock	183	24.5	+24.5
Labour	Pip Alnatt	165	22.3	−3.4
Majority		213	28.6	+13
Turnout		746	17.79	
Rejected ballots		2	0.3	
Registered electors		4,193		
Conservative hold		Swing		
