= Grimston, Leicestershire =

Village in Leicestershire, England

Grimston
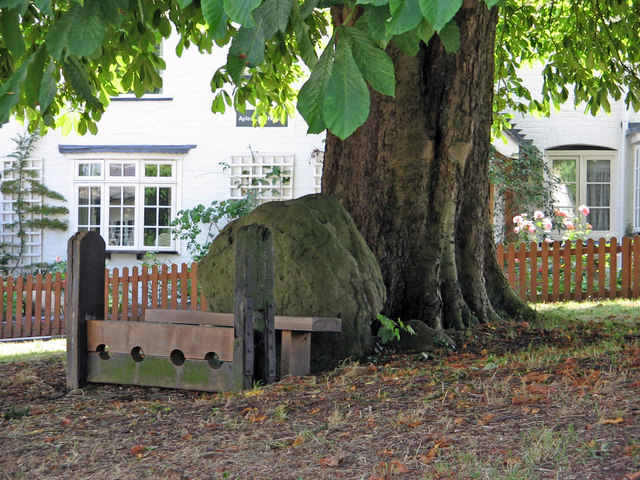
- Stone and stocks on the village green

- Location within Leicestershire
- Population: 294 (2011 Census)
- Civil parish: Grimston
- District: Melton
- Shire county: Leicestershire
- Region: East Midlands
- Country: England
- Sovereign state: United Kingdom
- Post town: Melton Mowbray
- Postcode district: LE14
- Police: Leicestershire
- Fire: Leicestershire
- Ambulance: East Midlands
- UK Parliament: Melton and Syston

Grimston is a village and civil parish in the Melton district, in the English county of Leicestershire. The parish includes the village of Saxelbye and the hamlet of Shoby. The population of the civil parish at the 2011 census was 294. On 1 April 1936 the parishes of Saxelby and Shoby were merged with Grimston. Although the current civil parish is called "Grimston" its parish council is called "Grimston, Saxelbye and Shoby Parish Council".

The village's name means 'farm/settlement of Grimr'.

== Amenities ==
Grimston has a pub, a place of worship and once had a railway station called Grimston railway station.

The 13th-century parish church of St Peter, restored in 1856, is a Grade II* listed building.
