= East Midlands Regional Assembly =

- Formation: 1998
- Dissolved: 2010
- Legal status: Regional chamber
- Headquarters: Melton Mowbray
- Region served: East Midlands
- Leadership: Stuart Young
- Budget: £2.4 million (2007/8)
- Website: Archived website

The East Midlands Regional Assembly was the regional chamber for the East Midlands region of the England. It was based at Melton.

== History ==
It was created by the Regional Development Agencies Act 1998. It was based opposite PERA on Nottingham Road in Melton Mowbray.

== Function ==
It was originally created to divide up the money given in government grants for the East Midlands. However, EMDA in Nottingham, the local government-run regional development agency, is taking over this role, and has done similar work in the past. It is currently involved in promoting energy efficiency throughout businesses and local authorities in the East Midlands.

== Structure ==
It had 111 members, with seventy from the 46 local authorities and thirty-five from local businesses. The Assembly Board has 18 members. There are 20 permanent staff. Government funding comes from the Department for Communities and Local Government.

== Abolition ==
The assembly was abolished on 31 March 2010 as part of the UK Government's Review of Sub-National Economic Development and Regeneration. Its functions were assumed by the East Midlands Development Agency and a newly constituted East Midlands Leaders' Board, the executive arm of East Midlands Councils.

== See also ==
- East Midlands
- East Midlands Development Agency
- East Midlands Leaders' Board,
