= East Midlands Councils =

- Predecessor: East Midlands Regional Assembly
- Formation: April 2010
- Region served: East Midlands
- Parent organisation: Local Government Association
- Website: www.emcouncils.gov.uk

East Midlands Councils is a consultative forum for local government in the East Midlands region of England. It is a regional grouping of the Local Government Association and the regional employers organisation.

It was established in April 2010 as a consequence of the dissolution of the former East Midlands Regional Assembly. East Midlands Councils consists of 98 Members; 92 Local Authority Members, two Fire and Rescue Authority Members, two Police Authority Members and two representatives of Parish and Town Councils. Councillor Martin Hill is the chair.

== Executive Board ==
The Executive Board is the executive arm of East Midlands Councils and functions as the Local Authority Leaders' Board for the region. It was established to jointly produce the Single Regional Strategy for the East Midlands, with the East Midlands Development Agency. In May 2010 East Midlands Councils announced that it is winding down regional strategy functions by the end of June that year in line with planning changes required by the new UK Government.

The Board has 17 members with nine representatives from the county councils and unitary authorities in the region and a further five representatives form district councils, one from each county. The county and unitary authority members will be considered permanent members while the district members will serve one year terms, but are eligible for re-nomination. When fully established, the board will meet four times per year with provision to hold special meetings as necessary.
