= William Boultbee Sleath =

English teacher and clergyman

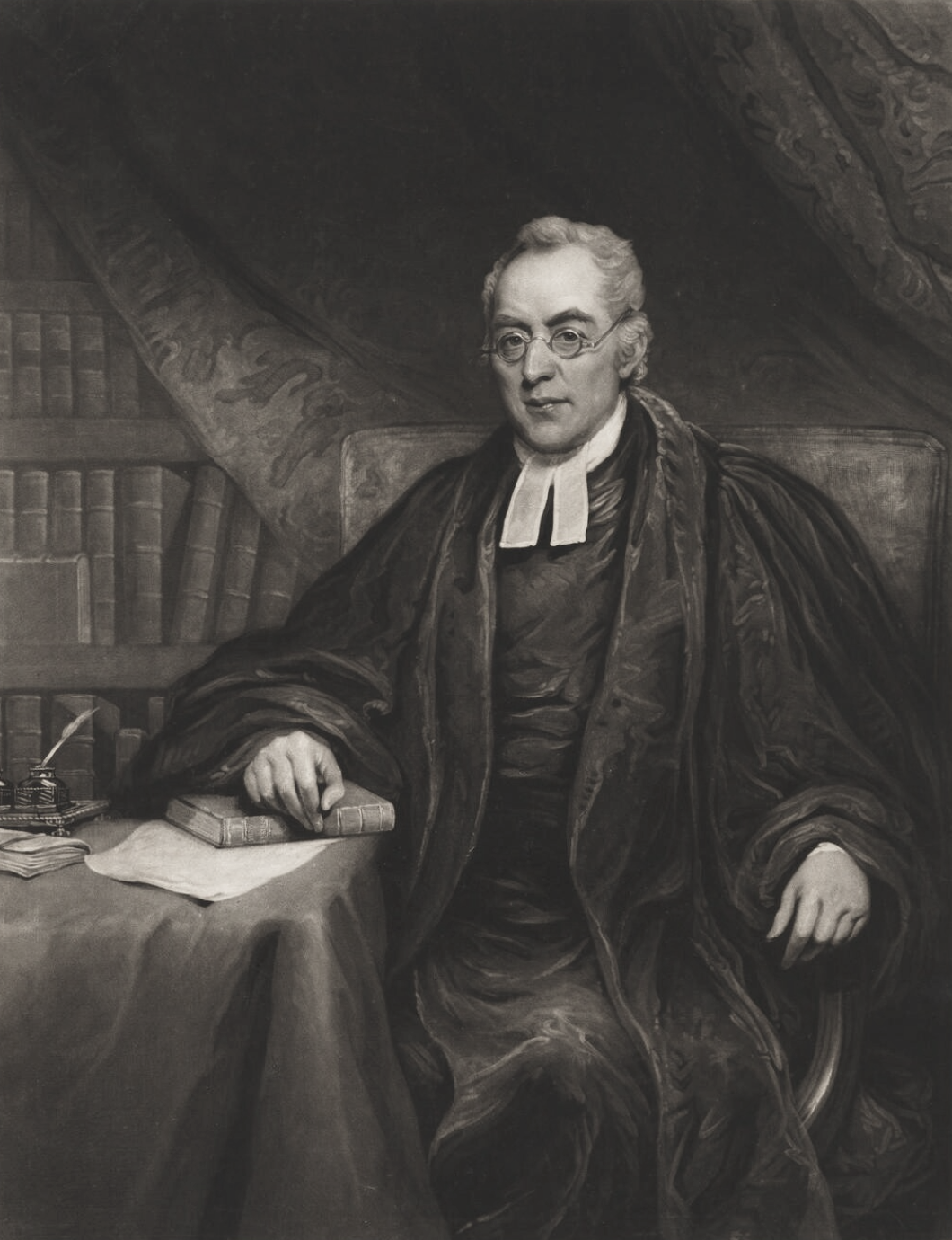
William Boultbee Sleath, 1813 engraving

William Boultbee Sleath (c. 1763 – 21 October 1843) was an English teacher and clergyman who was headmaster of Repton School from 1800 to 1830.

Sleath was born in Broughton, Leicestershire around 1763, and attended Rugby School. On leaving school in December 1778, he was immediately appointed assistant master at the same school. Sleath was later educated at Emmanuel College, Cambridge, obtaining a B.D. in 1797. He continued as a master at Rugby until he was elected headmaster of Repton School in 1800. In 1802 he obtained a D.D. degree. During his 30-year period as head of Repton school, he both raised its standards and significantly increased the number of students.

He was known as an excellent teacher, and as an erudite scholar, distinguished for his researches in Anglo-Saxon England. It was said of him that "Dr. Sleath's conversation was always entertaining and instructive and he did not at any period of his life possess the virtue of taciturnity". After his retirement in 1830 he was given the vicarage of Willington and the mastership of Etwall Hospital, an almshouse. He died on 21 October 1843 aged 80.
