= East Midlands Development Agency =

east midlands development agency
- Logo
- Abbreviation: emda
- Formation: April 1999
- Dissolved: March 2012 (announced 2010)
- Legal status: Government agency
- Purpose: Government funding for the East Midlands
- Location: Apex Court, London Road, Nottingham
- Region served: East Midlands
- Chief Executive: Jeff Moore
- Main organ: EMDA Board
- Parent organization: BIS
- Affiliations: EMRA, UKTI
- Budget: £159m (2008-9)

east midlands development agency, abbreviated emda, was the regional development agency for the East Midlands region of England formed in 1999 and dissolved in 2012.

== Structure and function ==
emda's office was located next to a Premier Inn, BBC East Midlands (and Radio Nottingham), and the NHS walk-in centre on London Road on a roundabout called 'Boots Island' on the A60.

From April 2010, the functions of the former East Midlands Regional Assembly were transferred to emda.

The chairman of the board of EMDA was Dr Bryan Jackson OBE. Previous chairmen were Derek Mapp (left 2004) and chief executive, Martin Briggs (left 2005).

It claimed to produce £1bn in economic benefits each year to the region.

== East Midlands economy ==
The area has large healthcare and engineering companies. The knowledge economy in the area (which emda is particularly interested in) is based around Nottingham, Leicester and Loughborough universities, nearby to which science parks are situated.

The Government Office for the East Midlands was based on Talbot Street in Nottingham.

== Abolition ==
In June 2010, it was announced that emda would be abolished and replaced by local enterprise partnerships by 2012. EMDA was abolished on 31 March 2012.
