= 2023 Melton Borough Council election =

2023 English local election

2023 Melton Borough Council
- 4 May 2023

All 28 seats to Melton Borough Council 15 seats needed for a majority

	First party	Second party	Third party
Leader	Joe Orson	Elaine Holmes	Pip Allnatt
Party	Conservative	Independent	Labour
Last election	22 seats, 59.7%	5 seats, 15.0%	0 seats, 7.4%
Seats before	19 (Note: Includes one vacant seat at Long Clawson and Stathern previously held by Conservative councillor Mel Steadman until her death in August 2022.)	8 (Note: Of the eight independent councillors before the election, three sat with the Green councillor as the "Opposition" group, led by independent Elaine Holmes, the other five did not belong to a group.)	0
Seats after	11	10	5
Seat change	▼11	▲5	▲5
	Fourth party	Fifth party
Party	Green	Liberal Democrats
Last election	1 seat, 14.3%	0 seats, 1.4%
Seats before	1	0
Seats after	1	1
Seat change	Steady	▲1
- Results by ward
Leader before election
Joe Orson
Conservative
Leader after election
Pip Allnatt
Labour
No overall control

The 2023 Melton Borough Council election took place on 4 May 2023, to elect all 28 members of Melton Borough Council in Leicestershire, England.

== Summary ==
Following the results, the Conservatives lost the council to no overall control. A Labour and independent coalition took control of the council, with Labour councillor Pip Allnatt being appointed leader of the council at the subsequent annual council meeting on 24 May 2023.

== Overall results ==
The overall results were:

Results
Party	Seats	Change
Conservative Party	11	▼11
Independents and Others	10	▲5
Labour Party	5	▲5
Green Party	1	Steady
Liberal Democrats	1	▲1

== Ward results ==
The results for each ward were as follows. Sitting councillors standing for re-election are indicated with an asterisk (*).

=== Asfordby ===
Asfordby (2 seats)
Party	Candidate	Votes	%	±%
Independent	Steven Carter*	454	63.9	
Green	Charlotte Pitt Miller	299	42.1	
Conservative	Ronald de Burle*	239	33.7	
Conservative	Nicholas Putnam	218	30.7	
Turnout		718	24.89	
Rejected ballots		8	1.1	
Registered electors		2,885		
Independent hold				
Green gain from Conservative				

=== Bottesford ===
Bottesford (2 seats)
Party	Candidate	Votes	%	±%
Conservative	Donald Pritchett*	602	57.5	+57.5
Labour	James Mason	506	48.3	N/A
Conservative	Morgan Kilburn	447	42.7	N/A
Turnout		1,051	32.29	
Rejected ballots		4	0.4	
Registered electors		3,255		
Conservative gain from Independent				
Labour gain from Conservative				

Donald Pritchett had been elected as an independent in 2019 but joined the Conservatives in September 2021. Seat recorded here as a Conservative gain from independent to allow comparison with 2019 result.

=== Croxton Kerrial ===
Croxton Kerrial
Party	Candidate	Votes	%	±%
Independent	Alan Hewson*	289	55.6	−6.6
Conservative	Jack Smith	231	44.4	+6.6
Turnout		525	33.85	
Rejected ballots		5	1.0	
Registered electors		1,551		
Independent hold				

=== Frisby on the Wreake ===
Frisby on the Wreake
Party	Candidate	Votes	%	±%
Conservative	Ronan Browne*	465	65.8	+65.8
Labour	Gwyneth Clay	139	19.7	N/A
Independent	Eric Brown	103	14.6	N/A
Turnout		712	44.53	
Rejected ballots		5	0.7	
Registered electors		1,599		
Conservative hold				

=== Gaddesby ===
Gaddesby
Party	Candidate	Votes	%	±%
Conservative	Robert Child*	431	74.7	+74.7
Labour	Adrienne Holland	146	25.3	N/A
Turnout		579	39.20	
Rejected ballots		2	0.3	
Registered electors		1,477		
Conservative hold				

=== Long Clawson and Stathern ===
Long Clawson and Stathern (2 seats)
Party	Candidate	Votes	%	±%
Conservative	Christopher Evans*	565	42.7	
Conservative	Simon Orson	512	38.7	
Labour	Michael McQuillan	492	37.2	
Independent	Nicholas Hall	469	35.4	
Independent	Dawn Thompson-Birch	116	8.8	
Independent	Leigh Birch	73	5.5	
Turnout		1,333	38.19	
Rejected ballots		10	0.8	
Registered electors		3,490		
Conservative gain from Independent				
Conservative hold				

Christopher Evans had been elected as an independent in 2019 but joined the Conservatives in November 2022. Seat recorded here as a Conservative gain from independent to allow comparison with 2019 result. The other seat in Long Clawson is shown as a Conservative hold, although it had been vacant since August 2022 following the death of the previous holder, Mel Steadman.

=== Melton Craven ===
Melton Craven (2 seats)
Party	Candidate	Votes	%	±%
Independent	Sharon Butcher	277	39.7	
Conservative	Ian Atherton	250	35.8	
Independent	Lee Freer	239	34.2	
Conservative	Jeanne-Marie Douglas*	237	34.0	
Labour	Timothy Litt	229	32.8	
Turnout		701	24.43	
Rejected ballots		3	0.4	
Registered electors		2,869		
Independent gain from Conservative				
Conservative hold				

=== Melton Dorian ===
Melton Dorian (3 seats)
Party	Candidate	Votes	%	±%
Labour	Sarah Cox	402	40.1	
Independent	Marilyn Gordon	305	30.4	
Independent	Patricia Cumbers*	300	29.9	
Conservative	Christopher Gray	283	28.2	
Independent	Tracy Beaken	277	27.6	
Green	Alastair McQuillan	255	25.4	
Conservative	Julian Lockwood	239	23.8	
Conservative	Simon Thompson	234	23.3	
Green	Isabelle Taylor	180	17.9	
Turnout		1,009	22.84	
Rejected ballots		6	0.6	
Registered electors		4,418		
Labour gain from Conservative				
Independent gain from Green				
Independent gain from Conservative				

Pat Cumbers had been elected as a Conservative in 2019 but left the party in November 2021 and became an independent. Seat recorded here as independent gain from Conservative to allow comparison with 2019 result.

=== Melton Egerton ===
Melton Egerton (2 seats)
Party	Candidate	Votes	%	±%
Labour	Philip Allnatt	278	43.2	
Labour	Michael Brown	260	40.4	
Conservative	Jason Sharman	179	27.8	
Independent	Peter Faulkner*	176	27.3	
Independent	Elaine Faulkner	175	27.2	
Conservative	Jonathan Winters	172	26.7	
Turnout		651	21.27	
Rejected ballots		7	1.1	
Registered electors		3,060		
Labour gain from Conservative				
Labour gain from Conservative				

Peter Faulkner had been elected as a Conservative in 2019 but left the party in May 2022 and became an independent. Seat recorded here as Labour gain from Conservative to allow comparison with 2019 result.

=== Melton Newport ===
Melton Newport (3 seats)
Party	Candidate	Votes	%	±%
Independent	Margaret Glancy*	629	47.1	
Independent	Simon Lumley*	609	45.6	
Conservative	Timothy Webster*	459	34.4	
Conservative	Robert Bindloss*	425	31.8	
Labour	Vanessa Jackson	413	30.9	
Conservative	Rebecca Smith*	404	30.2	
Independent	Bruce Midgley	336	25.1	
Turnout		1,344	30.22	
Rejected ballots		8	0.6	
Registered electors		4,448		
Independent gain from Conservative				
Independent gain from Conservative				
Conservative hold				

Simon Lumley and Margaret Glancy had both been elected as Conservatives in 2019 but left the party in June 2020 and March 2023 respectively to become independents. Seats recorded here as independent gains from Conservative to allow comparison with 2019 result.

=== Melton Sysonby ===
Melton Sysonby (3 seats)
Party	Candidate	Votes	%	±%
Liberal Democrats	James Adcock	461	39.4	
Labour	Helen Cliff	457	39.1	
Conservative	Sigrid Atherton*	438	37.4	
Conservative	John Illingworth*	423	36.2	
Conservative	Jacob Wilkinson*	370	31.6	
Independent	Rachel Godber	261	22.3	
Independent	Craig Digby	240	20.5	
Independent	Kenneth Panter	177	15.1	
Turnout		1,173	26.89	
Rejected ballots		3	0.3	
Registered electors		4,362		
Liberal Democrats gain from Conservative				
Labour gain from Conservative				
Conservative hold				

=== Melton Warwick ===
Melton Warwick (2 seats)
Party	Candidate	Votes	%	±%
Conservative	Alison Freer*	360	42.1	
Independent	Allen Thwaites	345	40.4	
Conservative	Stephen Ellis	337	39.4	
Labour	Susan Hammond	327	38.2	
Turnout		858	30.73	
Rejected ballots		3	0.3	
Registered electors		2,792		
Conservative hold				
Independent gain from Conservative				

=== Old Dalby ===
Old Dalby
Party	Candidate	Votes	%	±%
Conservative	Joseph Orson*	349	56.7	+0.5
Independent	Elaine Holmes*	179	29.1	N/A
Independent	Steven Cliff	88	14.3	N/A
Turnout		617	36.81	
Rejected ballots		1	0.2	
Registered electors		1,676		
Conservative hold				

=== Somerby ===
Somerby
Party	Candidate	Votes	%	±%
Independent	Leigh Higgins*	398	56.0	−9.8
Conservative	Vimbisayi Taruvinga	200	28.1	−27.7
Liberal Democrats	Hamish McAuley	113	15.9	−18.3
Turnout		715	46.79	
Rejected ballots		4	0.6	
Registered electors		1,528		
Independent gain from Conservative				

Leigh Higgins was elected as a Conservative in 2019, was expelled from the party in September 2021, appealed and was readmitted early in 2023, but resigned from the party in April 2023 to become an independent. Seat recorded here as independent gain from Conservative to allow comparison with 2019 result.

=== Waltham on the Wolds ===
Waltham on the Wolds
Party	Candidate	Votes	%	±%
Independent	Richard Sharp	323	62.2	N/A
Conservative	Benjamin Townley	196	37.8	+7.4
Turnout		525	34.40	
Rejected ballots		6	1.1	
Registered electors		1,526		
Independent hold				

=== Wymondham ===
Wymondham
Party	Candidate	Votes	%	±%
Conservative	Malise Graham*	302	71.7	+71.7
Labour	Graham Bett	119	28.3	N/A
Turnout		427	31.84	
Rejected ballots		6	1.4	
Registered electors		1,341		
Conservative hold				

== Changes 2023–2027 ==
- Christopher Evans, elected as a Conservative, left the party in May 2024 to sit as an independent.

=== By-elections ===
==== Asfordby ====
Asfordby by-election, 2 November 2023
Party	Candidate	Votes	%	±%
Labour	Gwyneth Clay	163	34.1	N/A
Conservative	Christopher Gray	123	25.7	−7.6
Independent	Peter Faulkner	100	20.9	N/A
Green	Isabelle Taylor	92	19.2	–22.4
Turnout		482	16.8	
Rejected ballots		4	0.8	
Registered electors		2,873		
Labour gain from Green				

The by-election was triggered by the resignation of Green councillor Charlie Pitt Miller.

==== Wymondham ====
Wymondham by-election, 23 May 2024
Party	Candidate	Votes	%	±%
Conservative	David Chubb	233	65.6	−6.1
Independent	Samantha Seaward	122	34.4	
Turnout		360	27.4	
Rejected ballots		5	1.4	
Registered electors		1,315		
Conservative hold				

The by-election was triggered by the resignation of Conservative councillor Malise Graham on 10 April 2024.

==== Croxton Kerrial ====
Croxton Kerrial by-election, 1 May 2025
Party	Candidate	Votes	%	±%
Conservative	Elaine Holmes	329	52.6	+8.2
Independent	Maxine Clift	296	47.4	−8.2
Turnout		639	41.6	
Rejected ballots		14	2.2	
Registered electors		1,535		
Conservative gain from Independent				

The by-election was triggered by the resignation of Independent councillor Alan Hewson.
