= Borough of Melton =

Coordinates: 52.8°N 0.8°W

- Borough and non-metropolitan district
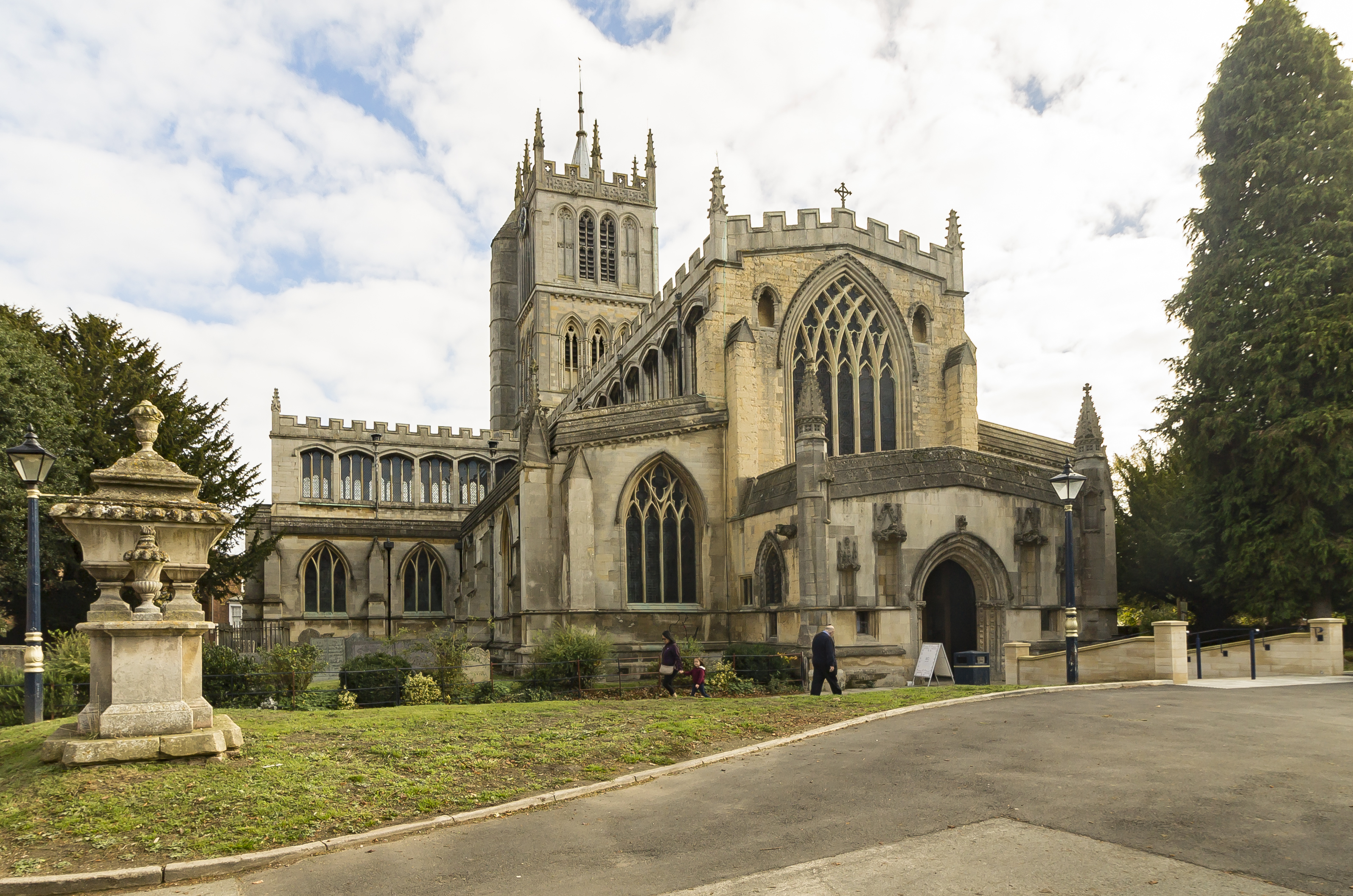
- Melton Mowbray, best known for both the Melton Mowbray Pork Pie and St Mary's Church. It is the administrative centre of the borough.

- Shown within Leicestershire.
- Sovereign state: United Kingdom
- Constituent country: England
- Region: East Midlands
- Administrative county: Leicestershire
- Founded: 1974
- Admin. HQ: Melton Mowbray

Government
  - Type: Melton Borough Council
  - MP: Edward Argar (C)

Area
  - Total: 186 sq mi (481 km^{2})
  - Rank: 79th

Population (2025)
  - Total: 54,694
  - Rank: Ranked 293rd
  - Density: 295/sq mi (114/km^{2})

Ethnicity (2021)
  - Ethnic groups: List: 96.9% White; 1.3% Mixed; 1.2% Asian; 0.4% Black; 0.2% other

Religion (2021)
  - Religion: List: 56.8% Christianity; 41.7% no religion; 1.2% other; 0.3% Islam
- Time zone: UTC+0 (Greenwich Mean Time)
  - Summer (DST): UTC+1 (British Summer Time)
- ONS code: 31UG (ONS); E07000133 (GSS)
- Ethnicity: 98.8% White
- Website: melton.gov.uk

Melton is a local government district with borough status in north-eastern Leicestershire, England. It is named after its only town, Melton Mowbray. The borough also includes numerous villages and surrounding rural areas. The north of the district includes part of the Vale of Belvoir. Melton is the least populous district of its type and the fourth least populous district in England overall.

The neighbouring districts are Harborough, Charnwood, Rushcliffe, Newark and Sherwood, South Kesteven and Rutland.

== History ==
The district was created on 1 April 1974 under the Local Government Act 1972, covering the area of two former districts, which were both abolished at the same time:

- Melton Mowbray Urban District
- Melton and Belvoir Rural District

The new district was named Melton after the area's only town, Melton Mowbray. The district was awarded borough status from its creation, allowing the chair of the council to take the title of mayor.

== Abolition ==
Under current local government reform plans, the district will be abolished in 2028 with its area becoming part of a Leicestershire and Rutland unitary authority.

== Governance ==
Melton Borough Council

Type
- Type: Non-metropolitan district

History
- Founded: 1 April 1974

Leadership
- Mayor: Jim Adcock, Liberal Democrat since 21 May 2026
- Leader: Ronan Browne, Conservative since 21 April 2026
- Chief Executive: Edd de Coverly since 28 August 2017

Structure
- Seats: 28 councillors
- Graph of the party split among 28 seats.
- Political groups: All parties (28) Conservative (11) Labour (5) Liberal Democrats (1) Independent (11)
- Length of term: 4 years

Elections
- Last election: 4 May 2023

Meeting place
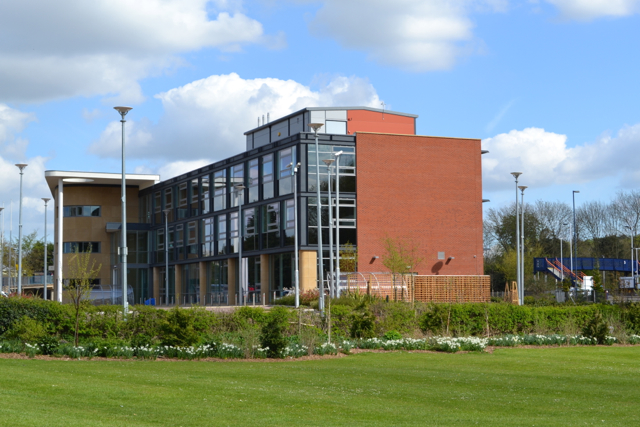
- Parkside, Station Approach, Burton Street, Melton Mowbray, LE13 1GH

Website
- www.melton.gov.uk

Melton Borough Council provides district-level services. County-level services are provided by Leicestershire County Council. Much of the borough is also covered by civil parishes, which form a third tier of local government.

=== Political control ===
The council has been under no overall control since the 2023 election. Since April 2026, it has been run by a Conservative minority administration, led by Conservative councillor Ronan Browne.

The first election to the council was held in 1973, initially operating as a shadow authority alongside the outgoing authorities until coming into its powers on 1 April 1974. Since 1974 political control of the council has been as follows:

Party in control	Years
Conservative	1974–1995
No overall control	1995–2003
Conservative	2003–2023
No overall control	2023–present

=== Leadership ===
The role of mayor is largely ceremonial in Melton. Political leadership is instead provided by the leader of the council. The leaders since 2011 have been:

Councillor	Party	From	To
Malise Graham	Conservative		14 Dec 2011
Byron Rhodes	Conservative	14 Dec 2011	17 May 2016
Pam Posnett	Conservative	17 May 2016	16 May 2017
Joe Orson	Conservative	16 May 2017	10 May 2023
Pip Allnatt	Labour	24 May 2023	2 Apr 2026
Ronan Browne	Conservative	21 Apr 2026	

=== Composition ===
Following the 2023 election, and subsequent by-elections and changes of allegiance up to April 2026, the composition of the council was:

Party	Seats
Conservative	11
Labour	5
Liberal Democrats	1
Independent	11
Total	28

Of the eleven independent councillors, seven sit together as the "Independent Group", and the other four (one of whom is a portfolio holder in the council's cabinet alongside the Conservatives) are not aligned to any group.

=== Elections ===
Since the last boundary changes in 2003 the council has comprised 28 councillors representing 16 wards, with each ward electing one, two or three councillors. Elections are held every four years.

The borough is part of the Melton and Syston parliamentary constituency.

=== Premises ===
The council is based at Parkside on Burton Street, adjoining Melton Mowbray railway station. The building was purpose-built for the council and opened in 2011.

When first created in 1974 the council inherited offices at Egerton Lodge on Wilton Road from Melton Mowbray Urban District Council and at Warwick Lodge on Dalby Road from Melton and Belvoir Rural District Council. In 1986 the council moved to a new building called Council Offices on Nottingham Road. The Nottingham Road building burnt down on 30 May 2008. The northern wing of the building was repaired and is now called Phoenix House, but the rest of the building was beyond repair and was demolished. The council instead chose to build new headquarters at Parkside, spending £5.6m on the new building.

East Midlands Councils is based at the Pera Business Park on Nottingham Road, opposite the former Melton borough offices. The former East Midlands Regional Assembly was based at the same site until it was abolished in 2010.

== Geography ==
The district borders South Kesteven, in Lincolnshire, to the east, Rutland to the south, Charnwood to the west (along the A46 Fosse Way), and Rushcliffe and Newark and Sherwood in Nottinghamshire to the north. The northern part of the district is known as the Vale of Belvoir.

== Parishes ==
The former Melton Mowbray Urban District is an unparished area. The rest of the borough is divided into civil parishes.

- Ab Kettleby, Asfordby
- Barkestone-le-Vale, Plungar and Redmile, Belvoir, Bottesford, Buckminster
- Broughton and Old Dalby, Branston, Burton and Dalby
- Clawson, Hose and Harby, Croxton Kerrial
- Eaton, Eastwell
- Freeby, Frisby on the Wreake
- Gaddesby, Garthorpe, Goadby Marwood, Grimston
- Harby, Hoby with Rotherby
- Kirby Bellars, Knossington and Cold Overton
- Saxelbye, Scalford, Shoby, Somerby, Sproxton, Stathern
- Twyford and Thorpe
- Waltham and Thorpe Arnold, Wymondham

== Electoral wards ==
The borough is divided into 16 electoral wards:

- Asfordby - covering the parish of Asfordby
- Bottesford - covering the parish of Bottesford
- Croxton Kerrial - covering the parish of Croxton Kerrial
- Frisby-on-the-Wreake - covering the parishes of Frisby on the Wreake, Kirby Bellars, Grimston and Hoby with Rotherby
- Gaddesby - covering the parishes of Burton and Dalby and Gaddesby
- Long Clawson and Stathern - covering the parishes of Clawson, Hose and Harby, Redmile and Stathern
- Melton Craven - one of six wards covering Melton Mowbray
- Melton Dorian - one of six wards covering Melton Mowbray
- Melton Egerton - one of six wards covering Melton Mowbray
- Melton Newport - one of six wards covering Melton Mowbray
- Melton Sysonby - one of six wards covering Melton Mowbray
- Melton Warwick - one of six wards covering Melton Mowbray
- Old Dalby - covering the parishes of Ab Kettleby, and Broughton and Old Dalby
- Somerby - covering the parishes of Knossington and Cold Overton, Somerby, and Twyford and Thorpe
- Waltham-on-the-Wolds - covering the parishes of Scalford and Waltham on the Wolds and Thorpe Arnold
- Wymondham - covering the parish of Wymondham

== Economy ==
Farming and food production are the main industries with Pedigree Petfoods in Melton, and its Waltham Centre for Pet Nutrition at Waltham on the Wolds. There is a large creamery (Long Clawson Dairy) at Long Clawson. Samworth Brothers are headquartered in Melton. The Royal Army Veterinary Corps and Defence Animal Training Regiment are also in Melton.

The Birmingham to Peterborough Line runs through the borough, and the borough is criss-crossed by the A607 (Leicester-Grantham) and the A606 (Nottingham-Oakham). Both these roads meet in the centre of Melton (outside Melton Brooksby College), with resulting congestion.

== Food ==
The borough is the home of Stilton Cheese and Melton Mowbray Pork Pies.

== Media ==
The area is served by BBC East Midlands and ITV Central with television signals received from the Waltham transmitter which is situated at Waltham-on-the-Wolds, 5 miles (8 km) north-east of Melton Mowbray.

Radio stations for the area are:

- BBC Radio Leicester on 104.9 FM
- Smooth East Midlands on 106.6 FM
- Capital Midlands on 96.2 FM
- Greatest Hits Radio Midlands on 106 FM
- The Eye, a community based station that serves Melton Mowbray and the Vale of Belvoir on 103 FM

Local newspapers are Leicester Mercury and Melton Times

== Education ==
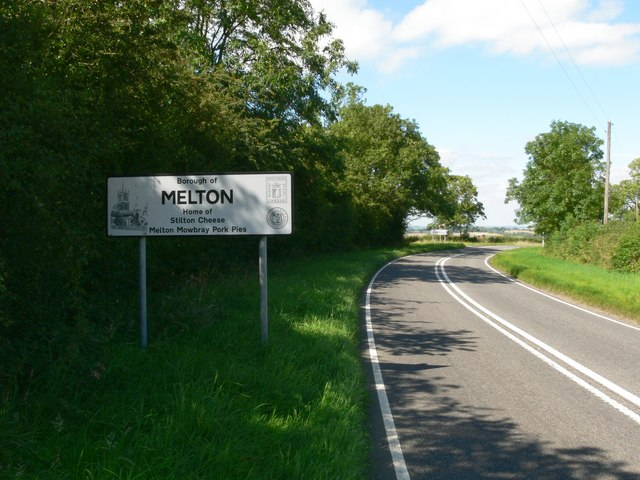
Entering the borough near Twyford on the B6047

Until September 2008, the district operated the three-tier education system, whereby there were three middle schools. All these schools fed into the same upper school in Melton from 14 to 18. At both GCSE and A level, the district's results are above the England average. From age 16 Students can attend either Melton Vale Post 16 Centre for academic sixth form courses, or Brooksby Melton College for vocational courses.

== Demography ==
Melton population pyramid

The Borough of Melton has experienced steady population growth in recent times albeit at a rate lower than the other districts within Leicestershire.

Population growth in the Borough of Melton
Year	1951	1961	1971	1981	1991	2001	2011	2016	2021	2031
Population	32,825	34,512	38,897	42,578	45,105	47,890	50,376	50,900	53,000	55,500
Census								ONS	ONS Projections	

=== Highest rate of accidental death in England in 2010/11 ===
In March 2012, Melton was identified as having the highest rate of accidental death by the Royal Society for the Prevention of Accidents, with statistics over the period from 2010/11 showing an average of 29 deaths for 100,000 people.

== Coat of arms ==
Coat of arms of Borough of Melton

Notes
Granted 17 December 1986
Crest
On a wreath Argent and Gules a lion rampant quarterly Argent and Gules holding in the dexter claw a Latin cross Or and in the sinister claw a roll of parchment Proper.
Escutcheon
Quarterly Gules and Vert in the first and fourth quarters a tower and in the second and third quarters a garb Or over all a lion rampant Argent.
Supporters
On the dexter side a bull Sable armed Or and gorged with a collar dancetty of two points upward Argent and on the sinister side a horse Argent gorged with a like collar Gules each resting the interior hoof on a tower Or the whole upon a grassy compartment divided per pale by furrows.
Motto
Unity With Diversity
